= Aukrug Nature Park =

Nature park in Schleswig-Holstein, Germany

Coordinates: 54°04′N 9°44′E

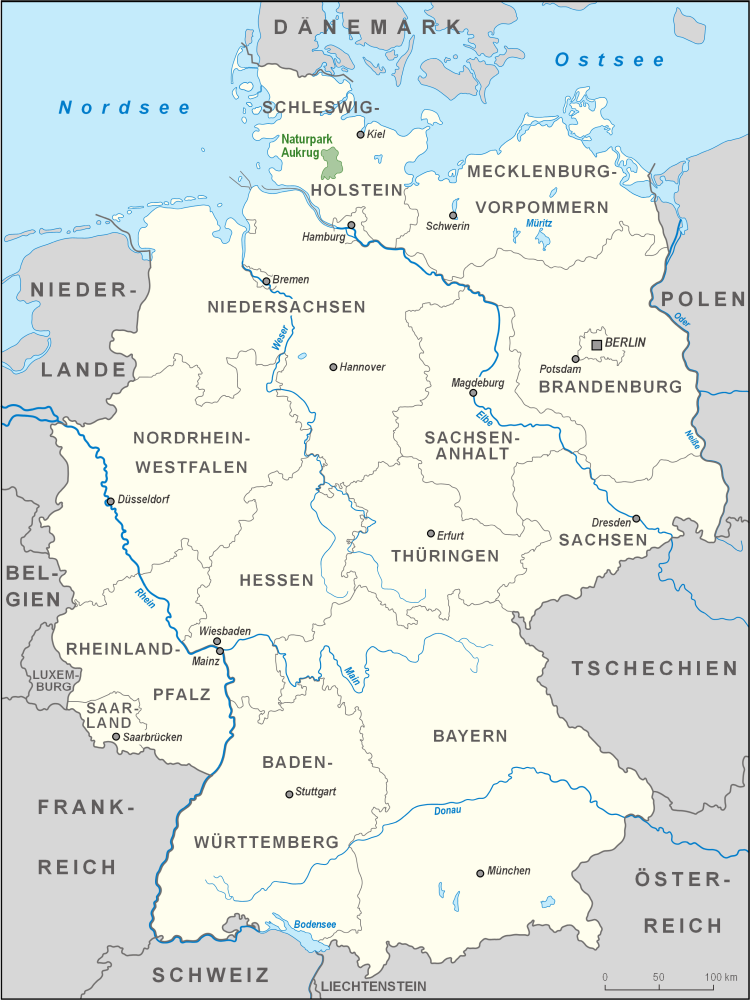
Location of the nature park in Germany

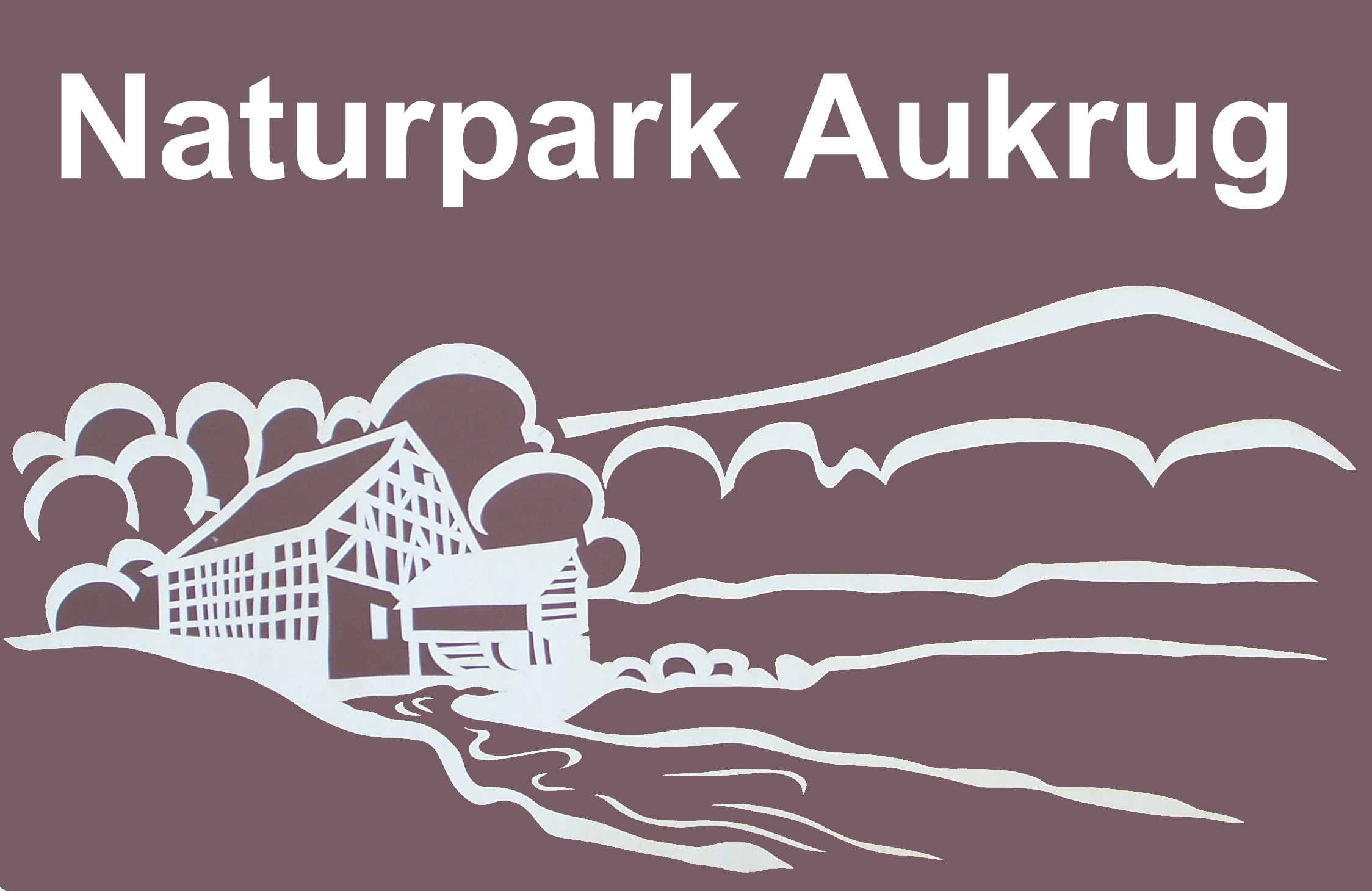
Information board on the A7

The Aukrug Nature Park (German: Naturpark Aukrug) is a nature park in north Germany with an area of 380 square kilometres (150 sq mi). It lies in the centre of the state of Schleswig-Holstein in the region of Holstein (districts of Rendsburg-Eckernförde and Steinburg). It is sponsored by an association formed by the 2 districts.

== Location ==
The nature park lies near Neumünster only a few kilometres west of the A 7 motorway. Two landscape forms occur in the park: the flat and pure loamy ground moraine landscape and the considerably more subdivided push moraine landscape, that rises to about 80 metres above NN.

=== Municipalities ===
The area of the nature park includes all or part of the following 42 towns and municipalities:

- In Rendsburg-Eckernförde district: Hamweddel, Embühren (partially), Brinjahe, Stafstedt, Luhnstedt, Jevenstedt (partially), Brammer, Bargstedt, Oldenhütten, Nienborstel, Remmels, Nindorf, Heinkenborstel, Tappendorf, Rade b. Hohenwestedt, Mörel, Gnutz (partially), Hohenwestedt (partially), Aukrug, Grauel, Meezen, Ehndorf (partially), Arpsdorf (partially), Nortorf (partially).
- In Steinburg district: Silzen, Poyenberg, Hennstedt, Wiedenborstel, Sarlhusen, Peissen (partially), Hohenlockstedt (partially), Lockstedt, Oeschebüttel, Rade, Fitzbek, Willenscharen, Rosdorf, Störkathen, Mühlenbarbek (partially), Kellinghusen (partially), Schlotfeld (partially), Winseldorf (partially).

=== Landscape ===
The landscape is characterised by moraines, woods, heath and a large number of ponds. The most important rivers in the nature park are the Stör and its many tributaries in the centre and the smaller Bünzau with its tributaries, the Buckener Au, Fuhlenau and Höllenau. Its highest point is the Itzespitze (83.4 m).

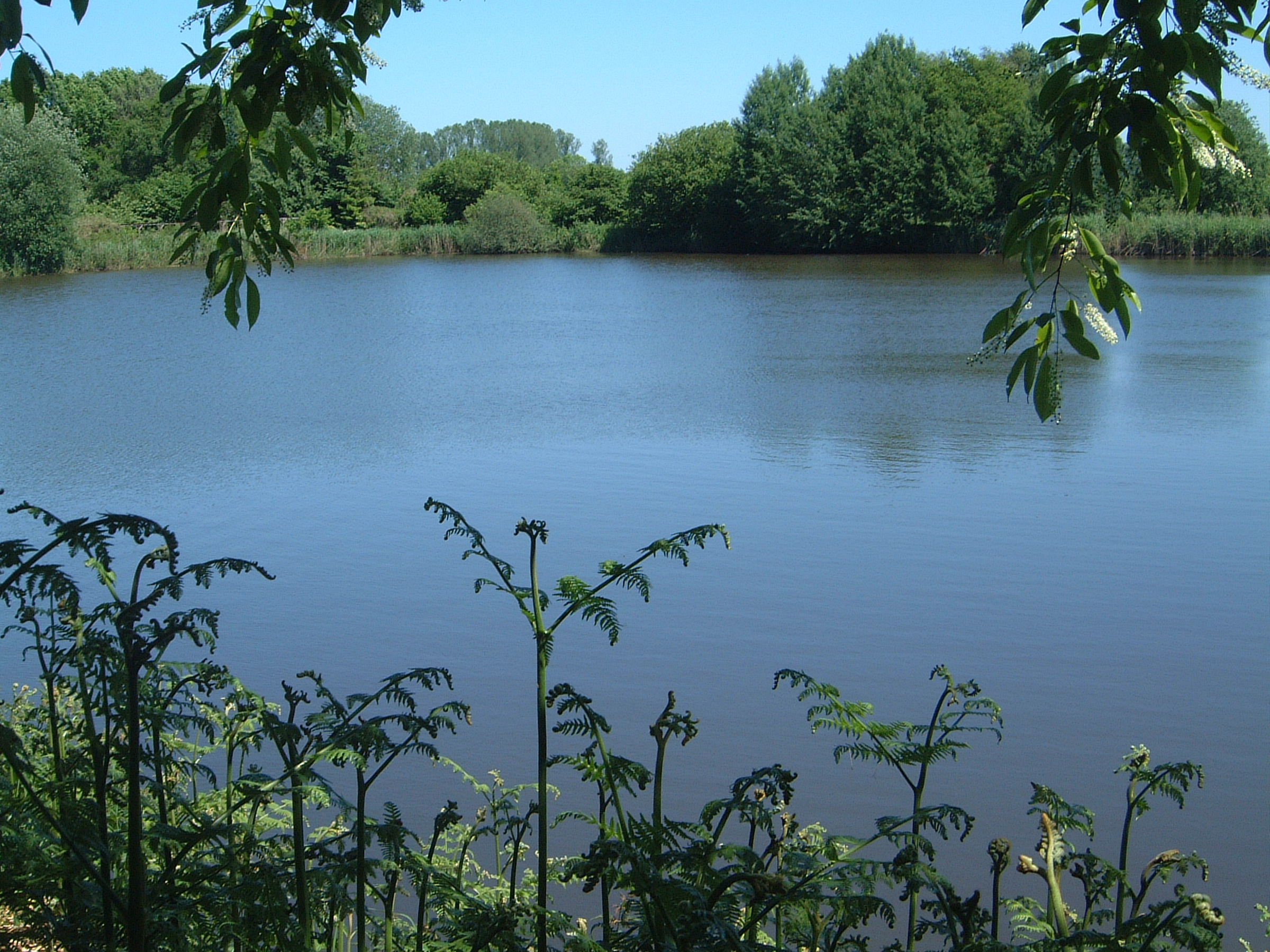
Pond at Aukrug-Innien

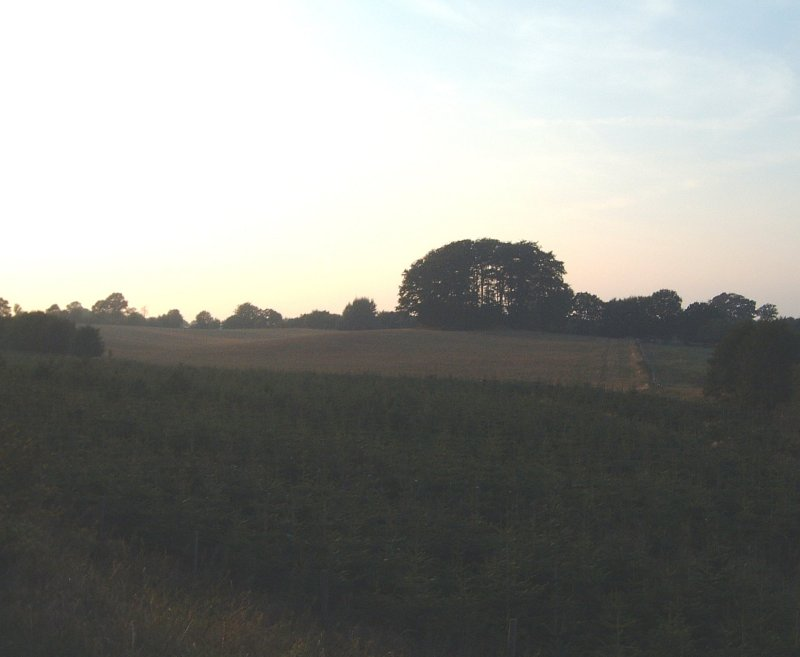
Landscape near the tumulus of Kluesbarg in Homfeld

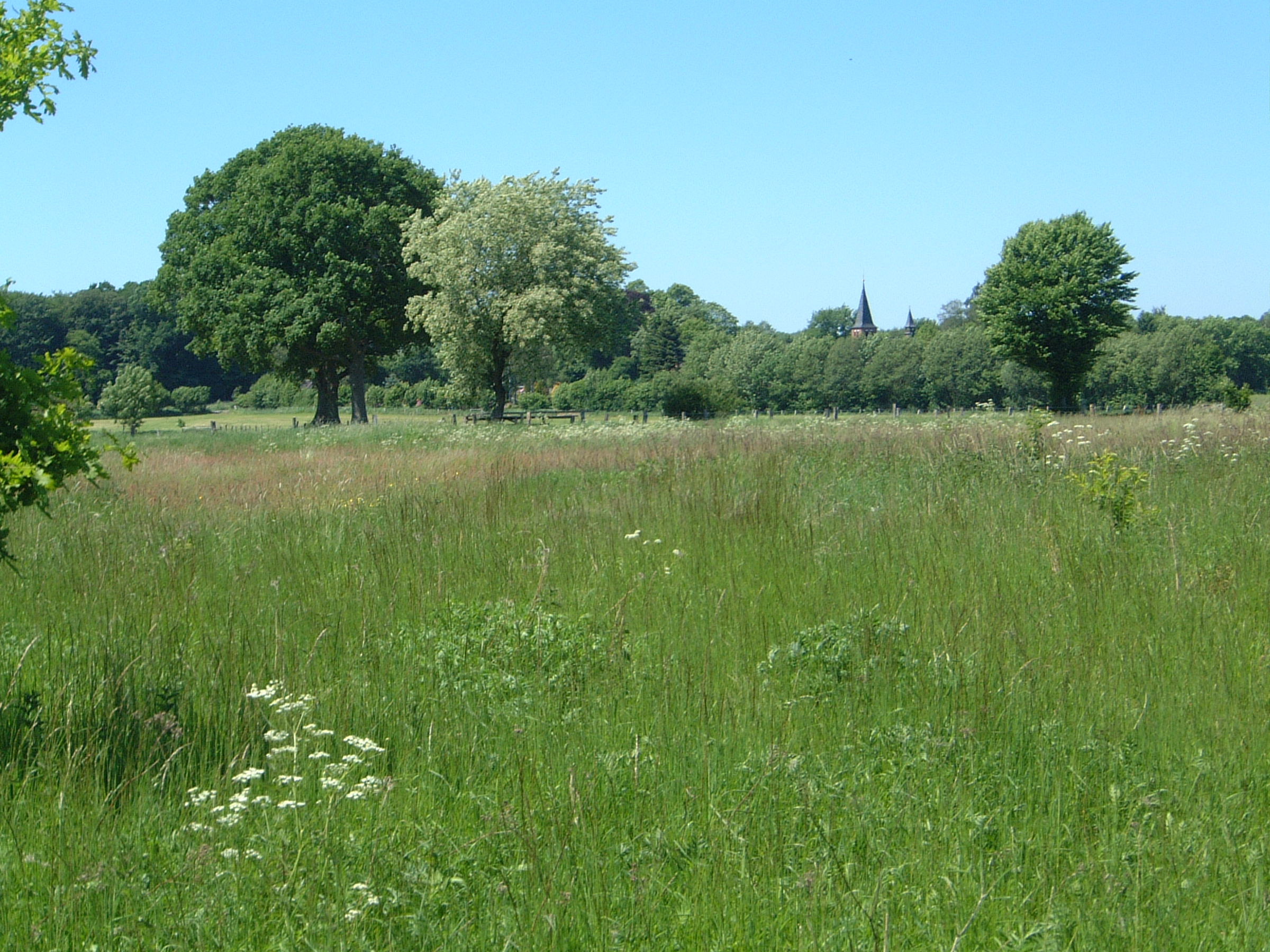
View from the edge of the Bünzau valley towards Innien

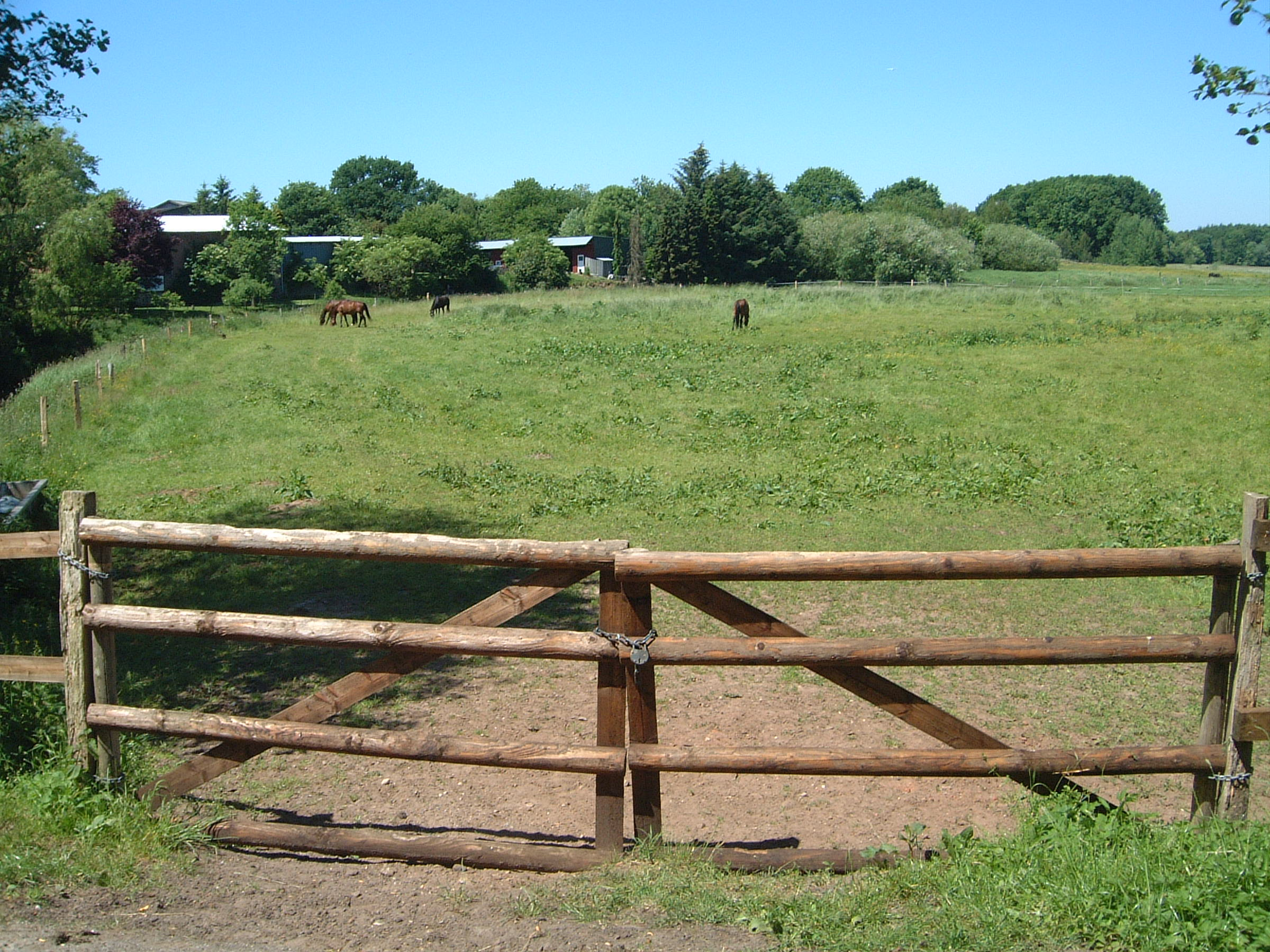
Valley of the Bünzau in Bünzen

== Nature conservation ==
The near-natural woodlands and their springs, streams and ponds which are typical of the nature park provide habitats for many endangered animal and plant species. These include the black stork, the eagle owl, many species of bat, the red kite, the common spadefoot toad and the alpine newt. Unique in Schleswig-Holstein are the wild-growing wolf's bane meadows.

Since 2002 Heck cattle have been kept in order to control certain areas.

In 2001 the Aukrug Nature Conservation Circle (Naturschutzring) was founded with assistance from the Schrobach Stiftung. This merger of various conservation organizations is intended to bring together the different interests of land users in the region and enable effective conservation work to be carried out. This approach has since become known as the Aukrug Way nationwide. In the first year of its existence the Nature Conservation Circle was able to set up or carry out several projects, including the re-watering of the Viertshöher Moor.

== Places of interest ==
- the Reher Kratt nature reserve
- the nature trail through the der Lehrpfad durch das Naturschutzgebiet Störkathener Heide nature reserve
- the Peissener Loch, an unusual geological feature
- the Erholungswald, a recreational wood, on the Boxberg hill
- the soil educational path in the Bredenhoper Gehölz wood near Mörel
- the Tönsheide Forest nature reserve
- the circual walk through the Viertshöher Moor in Böken

== Tourism ==
The region caters well for tourists and has a comprehensive network of bridleways, cycleways and trails. The Cheese Road goes through the southern part of the reserve. For walkers the Nature Park Way links the 5 nature parks in Schleswig-Holstein. On the A 7 there is an information board which describes the landscapes and points of interest along the motorways by the nature park.

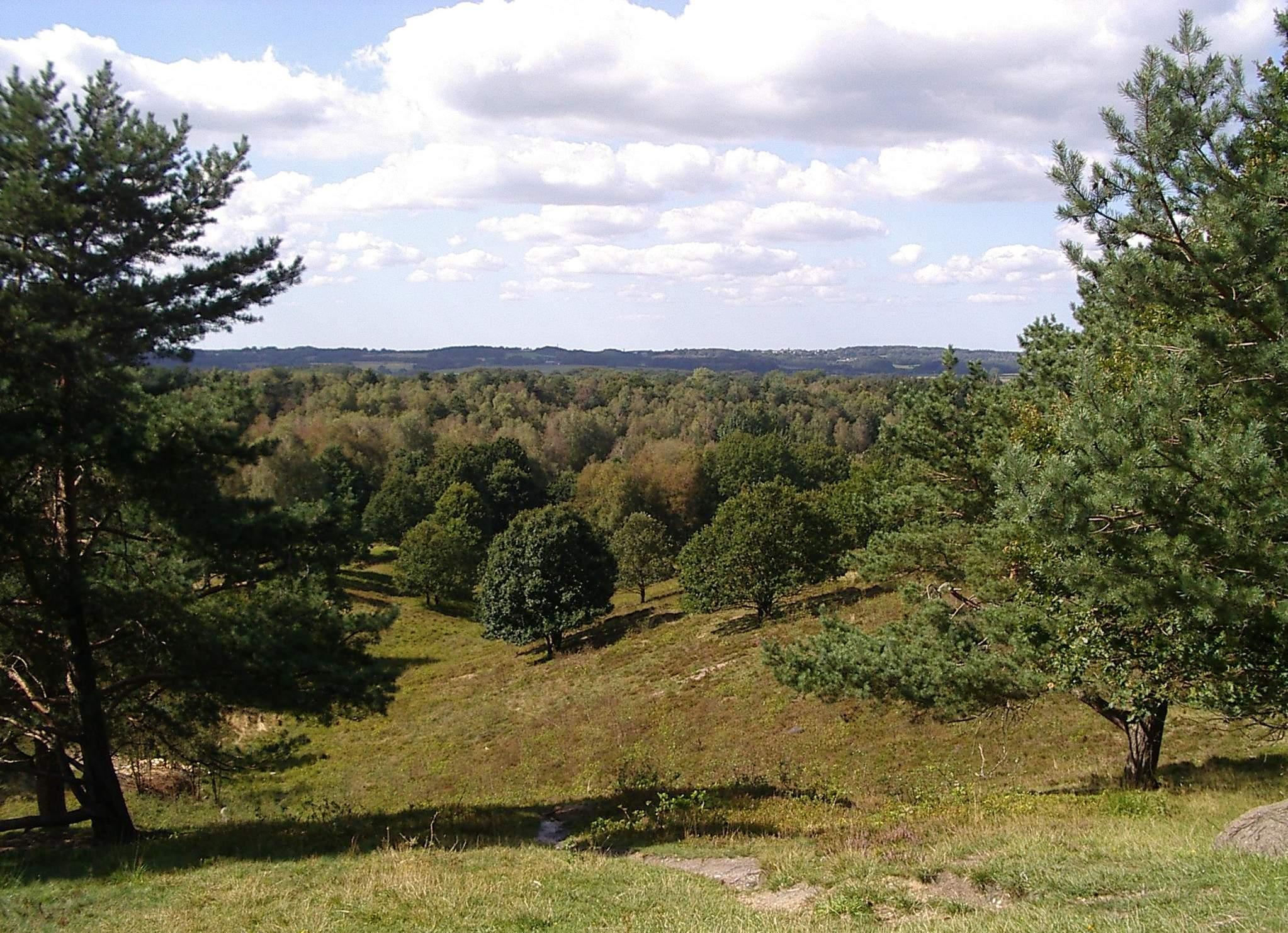
Blick vom Boxberg bei Aukrug-Homfeld

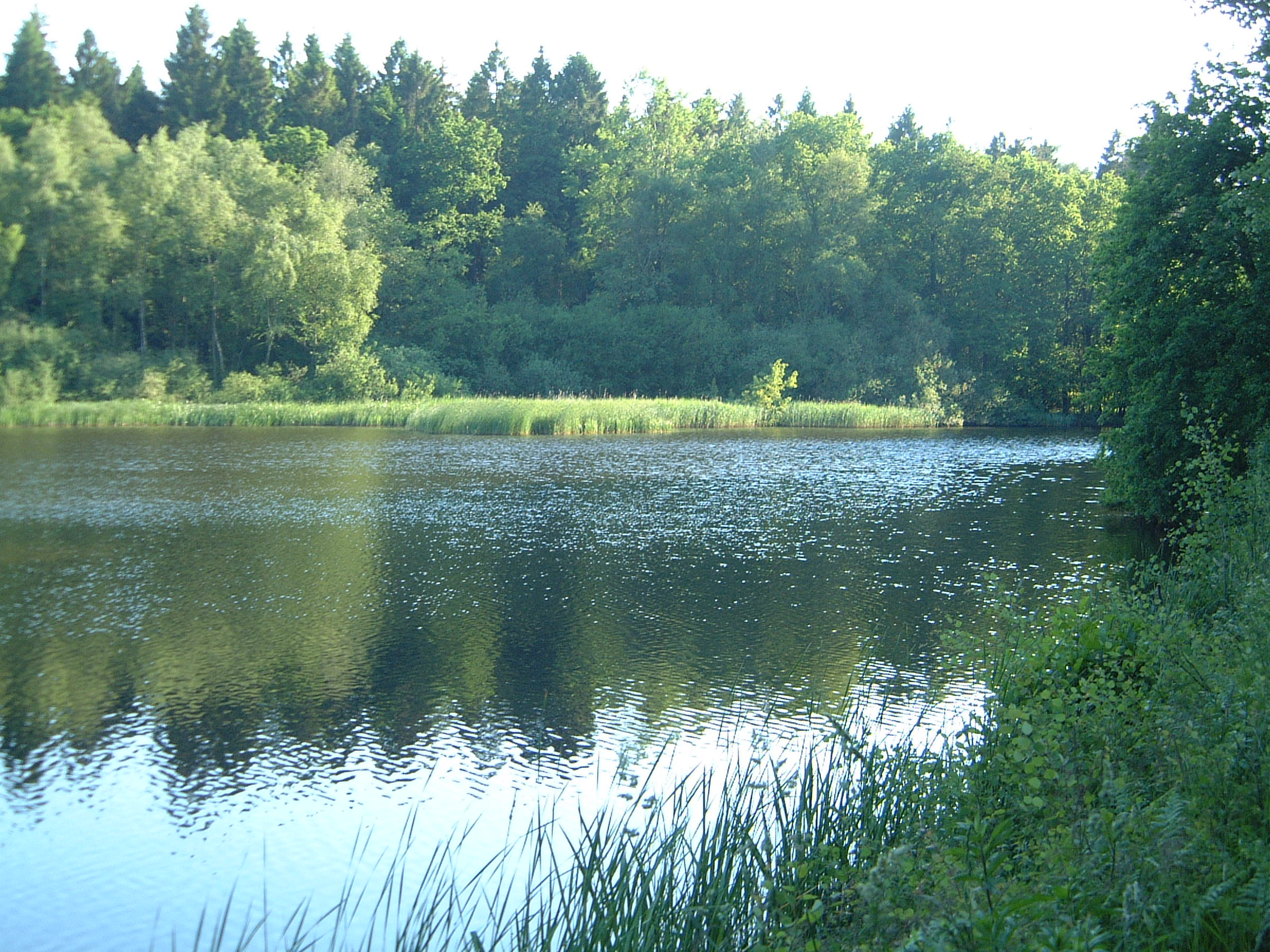
Teiche bei Waldhütten in der Nähe von Meezen

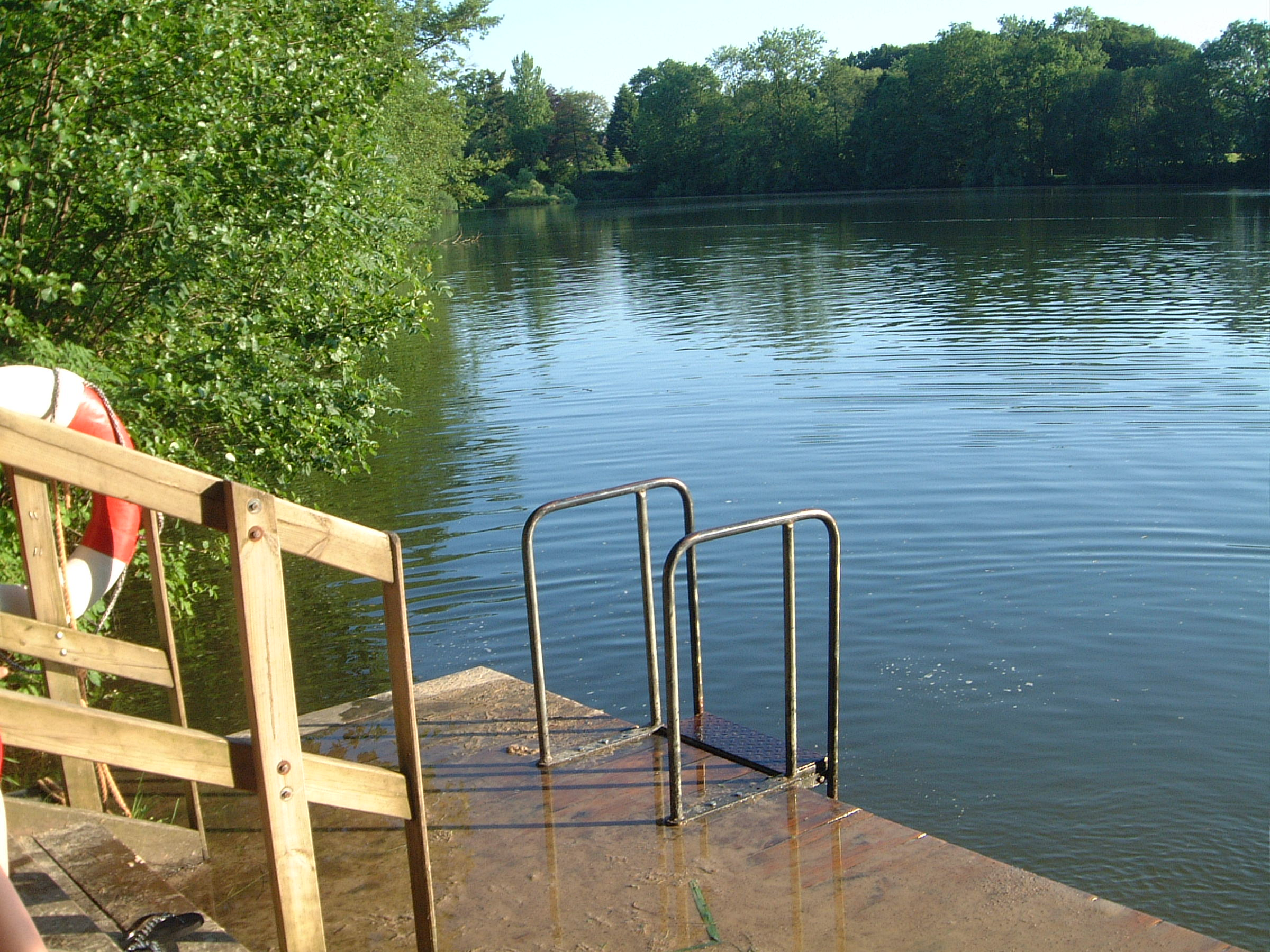
Badestelle Seelust in Hennstedt

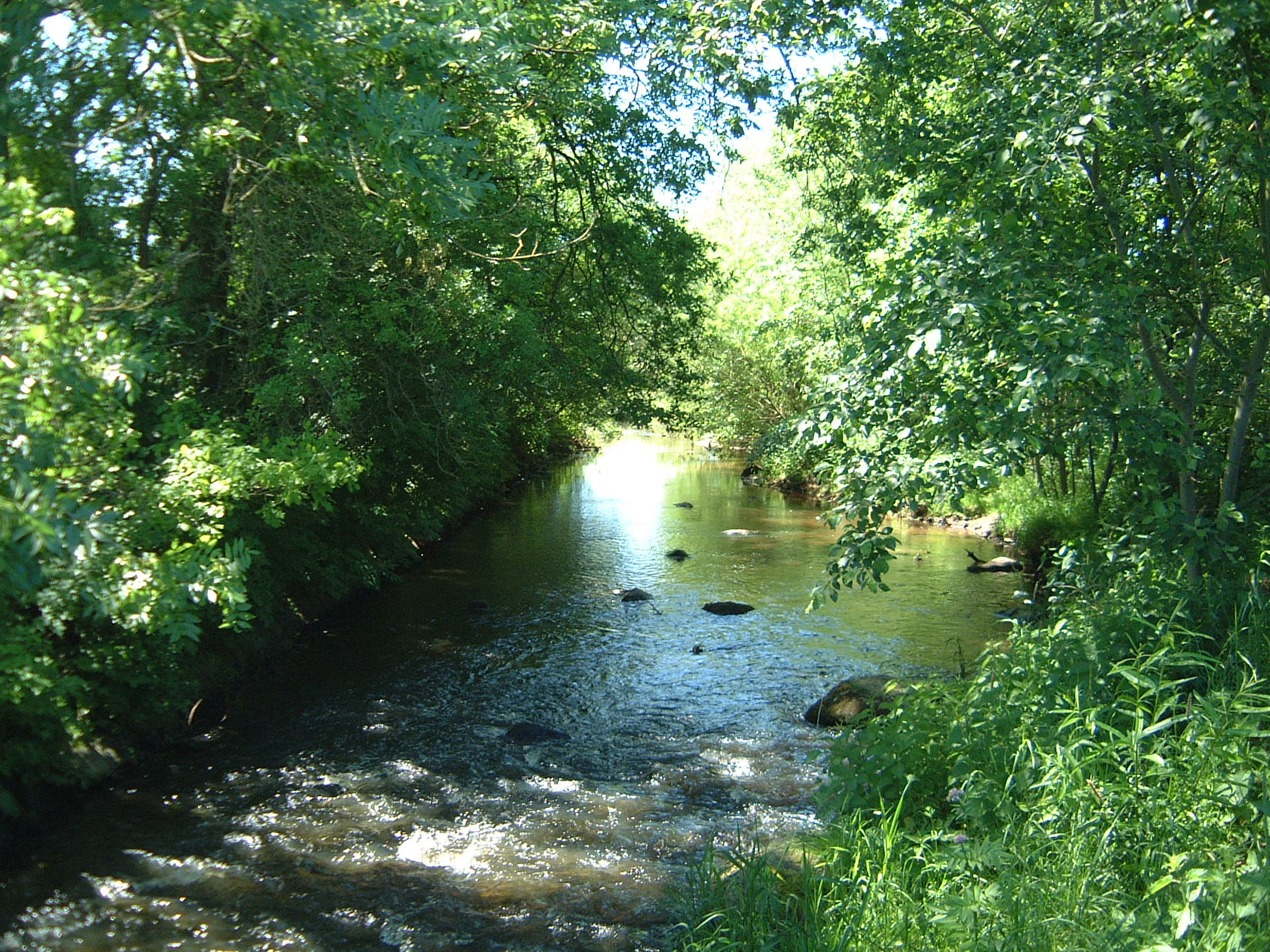
Höllenau hinter der Brücke in Aukrug-Böken

== Sources ==
- Amtsblatt Schleswig-Holstein 1998 S. 684 Erklärung über den Naturpark Aukrug im Kreis Rendsburg-Eckernförde
