= Hohenwestedt-Land =

- Former amt
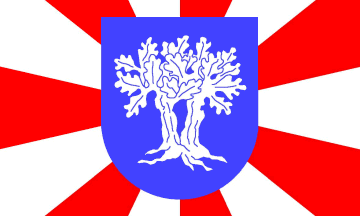
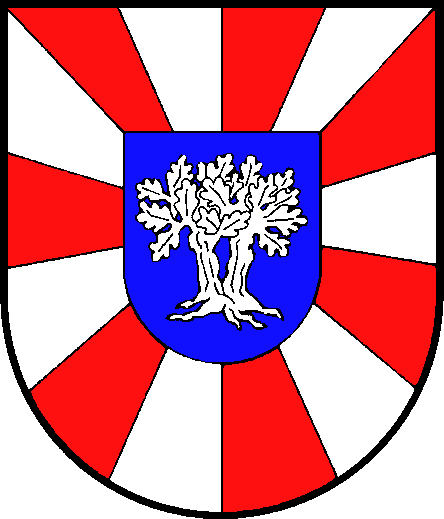
- Flag Coat of arms

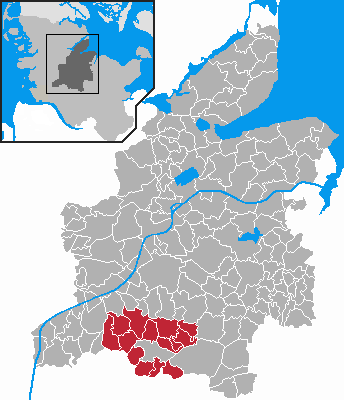
- Map of Rendsburg-Eckernförde highlighting Hohenwestedt-Land
- Country: Germany
- State: Schleswig-Holstein
- District: Rendsburg-Eckernförde
- Disestablished: 2012-01-01
- Region seat: Hohenwestedt

Area
  - Total: 135.47 km^{2} (52.31 sq mi)

Population (2010-12-31)
  - Total: 6,188
- Website: www.amthohenwestedt-land.de

Hohenwestedt-Land is a former Amt ("collective municipality") in the district of Rendsburg-Eckernförde, in Schleswig-Holstein, Germany. It was situated around the town Hohenwestedt, which was the seat of the Amt, but not part of it. Since January 2007 Hohenwestedt-Land formed the Verwaltungsgemeinschaft Mittelholstein together with the Amt Aukrug, Amt Hanerau-Hademarschen and Hohenwestedt itself. Mittelholstein became an Amt on 1 January 2012, and the Amt Hohenwestedt-Land was disbanded.

== Subdivision ==
The Amt Hohenwestedt-Land consisted of the following municipalities:

1. Beringstedt
2. Grauel
3. Heinkenborstel
4. Jahrsdorf
5. Meezen
6. Mörel
7. Nienborstel
8. Nindorf
9. Osterstedt
10. Rade bei Hohenwestedt
11. Remmels
12. Tappendorf
13. Todenbüttel
14. Wapelfeld
