= Hanerau-Hademarschen (Amt) =

Coordinates: 54.117°N 9.417°E

- Former Amt
- Coat of arms

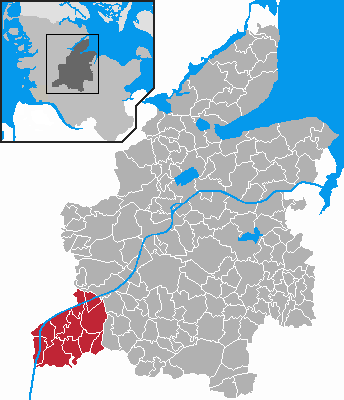
- Map of Rendsburg-Eckernförde highlighting Hanerau-Hademarschen
- Country: Germany
- State: Schleswig-Holstein
- District: Rendsburg-Eckernförde
- Disestablished: 2012-01-01
- Region seat: Hanerau-Hademarschen

Area
  - Total: 137 km^{2} (53 sq mi)

Hanerau-Hademarschen is a former Amt ("collective municipality") in the district of Rendsburg-Eckernförde, in Schleswig-Holstein, Germany. The seat of the Amt was in Hanerau-Hademarschen. It was disbanded in January 2012 together with the Amt Aukrug, Amt Hohenwestedt-Land and Hohenwestedt to become Mittelholstein.

The Amt Hanerau-Hademarschen consisted of the following municipalities:

1. Beldorf
2. Bendorf
3. Bornholt
4. Gokels
5. Hanerau-Hademarschen
6. Lütjenwestedt
7. Oldenbüttel
8. Seefeld
9. Steenfeld
10. Tackesdorf
11. Thaden
