= Middle Holstein =

The regions of Holstein and Schleswig

Middle Holstein (German: Mittelholstein) is a region lying in the centre of the north German state of Schleswig-Holstein roughly between the towns of Rendsburg, Kiel, Neumünster and Itzehoe.

The term is used both in tourism and borne by various, firms, associations and establishments as part of their name, even if it is somewhat erroneous, because the territory of South Schleswig begins at Rendsburg.

On 1 January 2012, as part of the administrative reforms, the old Amt (district) of Mittelholstein was merged with those of Aukrug and Hohenwestedt-Land as well as the municipality of Hohenwestedt. In addition the bank of Sparkasse Mittelholstein has its headquarters in Rendsburg.
