= Aukrug (Amt) =

Coordinates: 54.067°N 9.767°E

- Former Amt
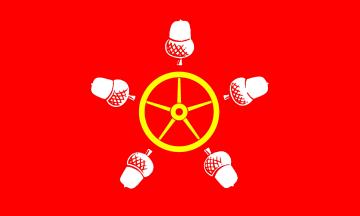
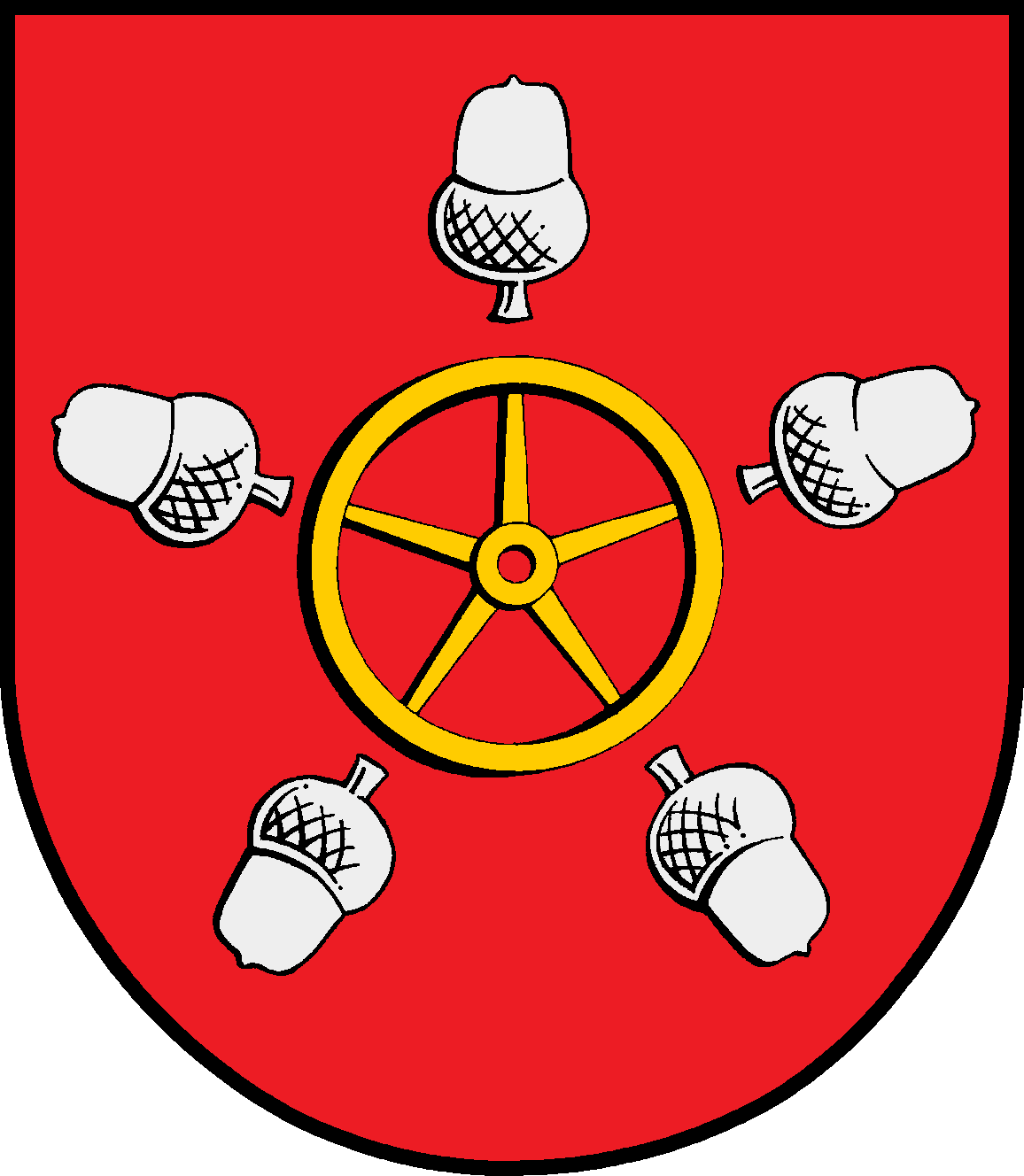
- Flag Coat of arms

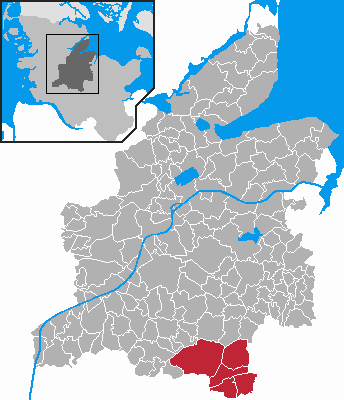
- Map of Rendsburg-Eckernförde highlighting Aukrug
- Country: Germany
- State: Schleswig-Holstein
- District: Rendsburg-Eckernförde
- Distablished: 2012-01-01
- Region seat: Aukrug

Area
  - Total: 115 km^{2} (44 sq mi)

Aukrug is a former Amt ("collective municipality") in the district of Rendsburg-Eckernförde, in Schleswig-Holstein, Germany. The seat of the Amt is in Aukrug. It was disbanded on 1 January 2012 along with the Hanerau-Hademarschen, the Amt Hohenwestedt-Land and Hohenwestedt to become Mittelholstein.

The Amt Aukrug consisted of the following municipalities:

1. Arpsdorf
2. Aukrug
3. Ehndorf
4. Padenstedt
