= Wasbek =

- Municipality
- Coat of arms

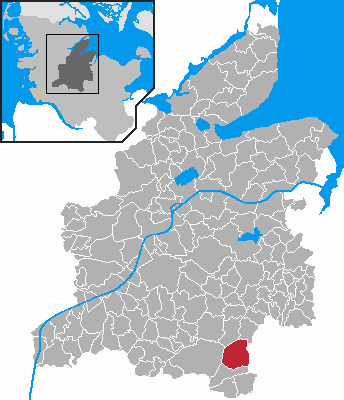
- Location of Wasbek within Rendsburg-Eckernförde district
- Interactive map of Wasbek
- Location within Germany Location within Schleswig-Holstein
- Coordinates: 54°4′N 9°54′E
- Country: Germany
- State: Schleswig-Holstein
- District: Rendsburg-Eckernförde

Government
  - Mayor: Dörte Kühl

Area
  - Total: 23.49 km^{2} (9.07 sq mi)
- Elevation: 18 m (59 ft)

Population (2025-12-31)
  - Total: 2,502
  - Density: 106.5/km^{2} (275.9/sq mi)
- Time zone: UTC+01:00 (CET)
  - Summer (DST): UTC+02:00 (CEST)
- Postal codes: 24647
- Dialling codes: 04321
- Vehicle registration: RD
- Website: www.amt-aukrug.de

Wasbek is a municipality, immediately west of Neumünster, in the district of Rendsburg-Eckernförde, in Schleswig-Holstein, Germany.

== Geography ==
Wasbek lies immediately west of Neumünster. In the west the park Aukrug borders the municipality. In the east runs Federal Highway 7 from Hamburg to Flensburg through the village area and is on the Neumünster-Mitte exit. The Bundesstraße 430 from Lütjenburg to Schenefeld (Federal highway 23) runs from east to west through the municipality. The village is also connected to the Nordbahn, on the Neumünster–Heide rail line. The bus line 9 connects Wasbek and Wasbek-Bullenbek with Neumünster.

Wasbek is south of the municipality of Timmaspe or Krogaspe, north of Ehndorf and east of Aukrug (see regional map at: Rendsburg-Eckernförde).

== Politics ==
On 15 June 2008 Wasbek left the county Aukrug (Amt) and is now an administrative community with the city of Neumünster, which handles administration for the municipality.

=== Community representation ===
Of the 17 seats in the municipal council, the CDU and the SPD, since the 2008 local election, have had six seats each, the electoral community BMW three seats and the FDP two seats.

=== Coat of arms ===
In the crest a left-oblique silvery wave divides green and red areas. In the green area lies a silver sheaf of corn with five ears; in the red area is a silver cartwheel (wagon wheel).
