= Rade =

Rade may refer to:

- Rade people, a people group in Southeast Asia also called "Rhade" or "Êđê"
  - The Rade language spoken by the Rade.
- places in Lower-Saxony, Germany:
  - Rade, Neu Wulmstorf, a village in the district of Harburg
- places in Schleswig-Holstein, Germany:
  - Rade, Steinburg, a municipality in the district of Steinburg
  - Rade bei Hohenwestedt, a municipality in the district of Rendsburg-Eckernförde
  - Rade bei Rendsburg, a municipality in the district of Rendsburg-Eckernförde
- Råde, a municipality in Norway

Personal name

- Rade, a masculine given name, often the shortened Serbo-Croatian form of Radovan, Radoslav, Radivoje. Notable people with the name include:
  - Rade, a Swiss hip hop artist, former member of Sens Unik
  - Rade Bogdanović (born 1970), Serbian football player
  - Rade Bulat (1920–2013), Croatian Serb communist activist
  - Rade Grbić (1870–1910), United States Navy sailor of Dalmatian Serb origin
  - Rade Končar (1911–1942), Croatian Serb communist activist
  - Rade Milovanović (1954–2024), Bosnian and American chess master
  - Rade Šerbedžija (born 1946), Croatian Serb actor
- Rade, a surname. Notable people with the name include:
  - John Rade (born 1960), American football player
  - Olle Råde (born 1978), Swedish card game player
