= Mörel =

Mörel may refer to:

- Mörel, Germany, municipality in Schleswig-Holstein
- Mörel, Switzerland a former municipality in Valais, now part of Mörel-Filet
