= Itzespitze =

Hill in Schleswig-Holstein, Germany

Coordinates: 54°02′45.2″N 9°44′34.8″E

The Itzespitze is a low hill on the L121 between Aukrug and Hennstedt (Steinburg). At 83.4 metres, it is the highest elevation in the district of Steinburg and in the Aukrug Nature Park.

== Origin of the name ==
The previously nameless hill was given its name, after press and television in 1998 reported humorously about the first climb of the highest peak in the district of Steinburg by members of the German Alpine Club, during which a summit cross was erected.
