= Aukrug =

- Municipality
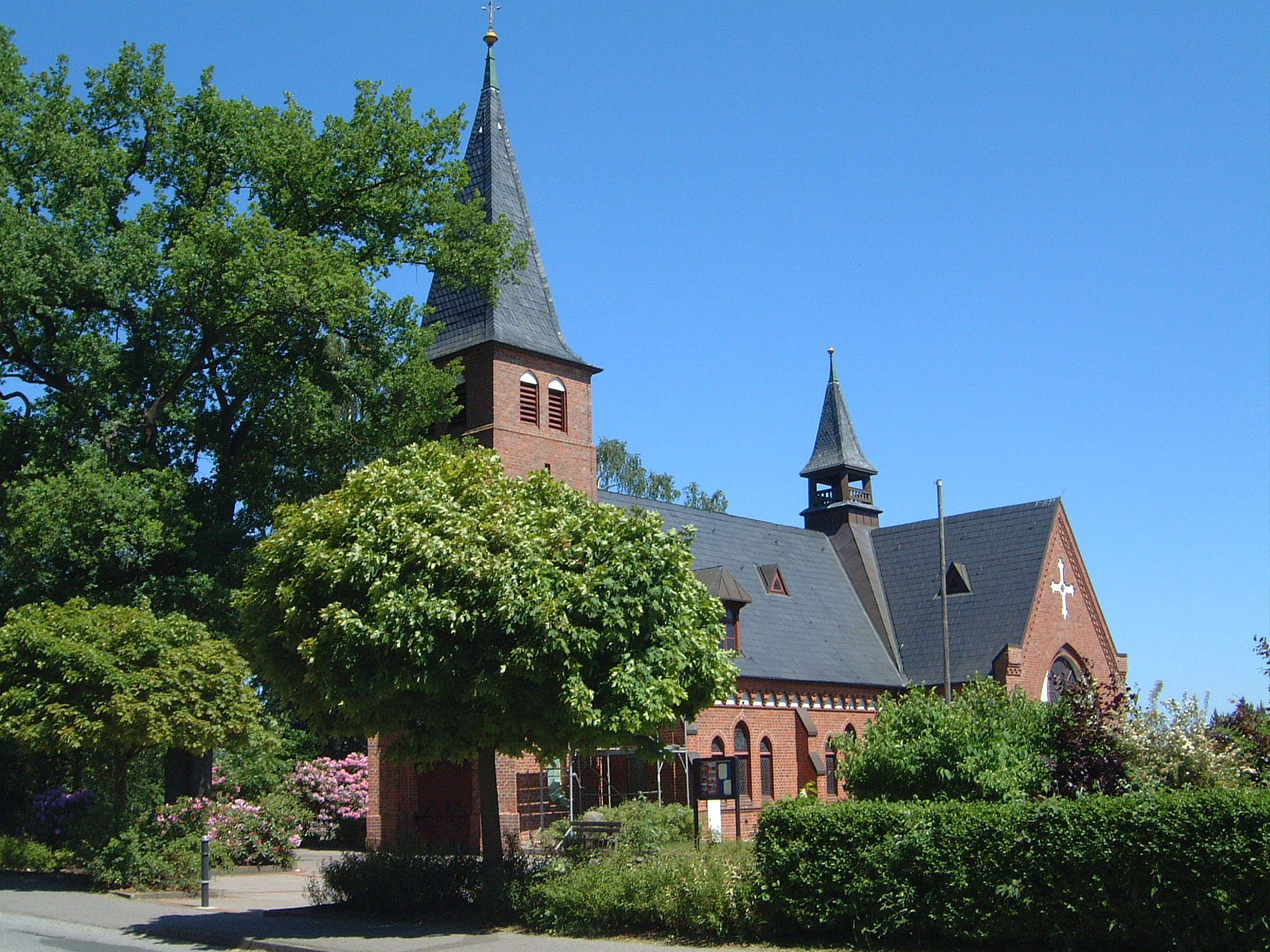
- Church in Aukrug

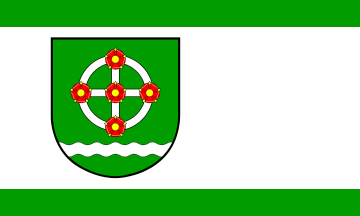
- Flag Coat of arms

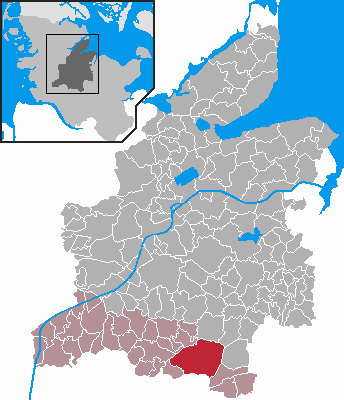
- Location of Aukrug within Rendsburg-Eckernförde district
- Interactive map of Aukrug
- Location within Germany Location within Schleswig-Holstein
- Coordinates: 54°4′N 9°46′E
- Country: Germany
- State: Schleswig-Holstein
- District: Rendsburg-Eckernförde
- Municipal assoc.: Mittelholstein

Government
  - Mayor: Joachim Rehder (SPD)

Area
  - Total: 49.9 km^{2} (19.3 sq mi)
- Elevation: 20 m (66 ft)

Population (2025-12-31)
  - Total: 3,819
  - Density: 76.5/km^{2} (198/sq mi)
- Time zone: UTC+01:00 (CET)
  - Summer (DST): UTC+02:00 (CEST)
- Postal codes: 24613
- Dialling codes: 04873
- Vehicle registration: RD
- Website: www.amt-aukrug.de

Aukrug (Low German: Aukrog) is a municipality in the district of Rendsburg-Eckernförde, in Schleswig-Holstein, Germany. It is situated approximately 13 km west of Neumünster, and 35 km southwest of Kiel. The municipality was established on 31 December 1969 through the merger of the previously independent communities of Bargfeld (including the village of Tönsheide), Böken, Bünzen, Homfeld (including Bucken), and Innien. Its name derived from a regional geographical designation, and it is officially recognized as a state-approved resort (staatlich anerkannter Erholungsort).

== Geography ==
Aukrug is the seat of the Amt (collective municipality) of Aukrug.

Aukrug is south of the municipality of Mörel or Gnutz, east of Hohenwestedt and west of Wasbek and Ehndorf.

== History ==
Innien, the oldest part of the municipality, appears in a surviving record from as far back as 1128. The name Aukrug comes from ‘in de Aukrögen’, using the Plattdeutsch (Low German) of the region, and means something along the lines of ‘in the folds of the flood plain’.

The Municipiality of Aukrug was formed on 1 January 1970 from the five villages, Bargfeld (with the district of Tönsheide), Böken, Bünzen, Homfeld (with the district of Bücken) and Innien.

=== Tönsheide Forest ===
Tönsheide Forest lies east of Aukrug specialist hospital and is a nature reserve with an area of 67 hectares (170 acres). It consists of large areas of near-natural woodland with scattered areas of heath.

== See also ==
- Aukrug Nature Park
