= Remme =

Remme is a surname. Notable people with the surname include:

- Roni Remme (born 1996), Canadian skier
- Stian Remme (born 1982), Norwegian cyclist

== See also ==
- Remmel
- Remmer
