= Fockbek (Amt) =

- Amt
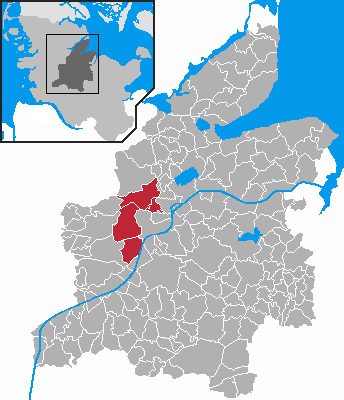
- Map of Rendsburg-Eckernförde highlighting Fockbek
- Interactive map of Fockbek
- Location within Germany Location within Schleswig-Holstein
- Coordinates: 54°18′N 9°36′E
- Country: Germany
- State: Schleswig-Holstein
- District: Rendsburg-Eckernförde
- Seat: Fockbek
- Subdivisions: 4 municipalities

Government
  - Mayor: Norbert Wilkens (CDU)

Area
  - Total: 66.61 km^{2} (25.72 sq mi)

Population (2025-12-31)
  - Total: 11,028
  - Density: 165.6/km^{2} (428.8/sq mi)
- Time zone: UTC+01:00 (CET)
  - Summer (DST): UTC+02:00 (CEST)
- Website: www.fockbek.de

Fockbek is an Amt ("collective municipality") in the district of Rendsburg-Eckernförde, in Schleswig-Holstein, Germany. The seat of the Amt is in Fockbek.

The Amt Fockbek consists of the following municipalities:

1. Alt Duvenstedt
2. Fockbek
3. Nübbel
4. Rickert
