= Hanerau-Hademarschen =

- Municipality
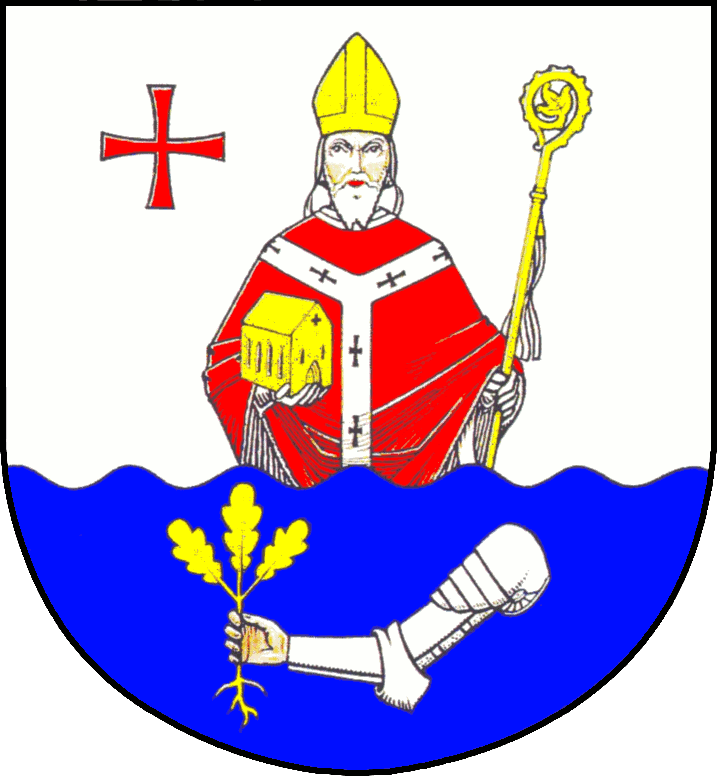
- Coat of arms

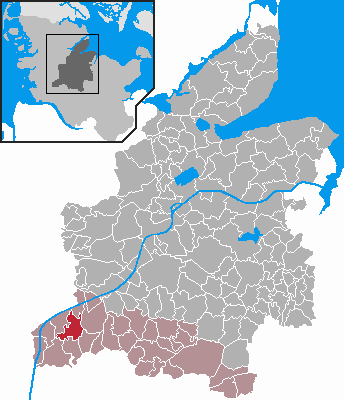
- Location of Hanerau-Hademarschen within Rendsburg-Eckernförde district
- Interactive map of Hanerau-Hademarschen
- Location within Germany Location within Schleswig-Holstein
- Coordinates: 54°7′43″N 9°24′58″E
- Country: Germany
- State: Schleswig-Holstein
- District: Rendsburg-Eckernförde
- Municipal assoc.: Mittelholstein

Government
  - Mayor: Thomas Deckner (CDU)

Area
  - Total: 14.63 km^{2} (5.65 sq mi)
- Elevation: 38 m (125 ft)

Population (2025-12-31)
  - Total: 3,044
  - Density: 208.1/km^{2} (538.9/sq mi)
- Time zone: UTC+01:00 (CET)
  - Summer (DST): UTC+02:00 (CEST)
- Postal codes: 25557
- Dialling codes: 04872
- Vehicle registration: RD

Hanerau-Hademarschen is a municipality in the district of Rendsburg-Eckernförde, in Schleswig-Holstein, Germany. It is situated near the Kiel Canal, approx. 25 km southwest of Rendsburg.

Hanerau-Hademarschen was until 2008 the seat of the Amt ("collective municipality") Hanerau-Hademarschen. Now the seat of the Amt is Hohenwestedt which is outside the area of Hanerau-Hademarschen.

== Notable people ==
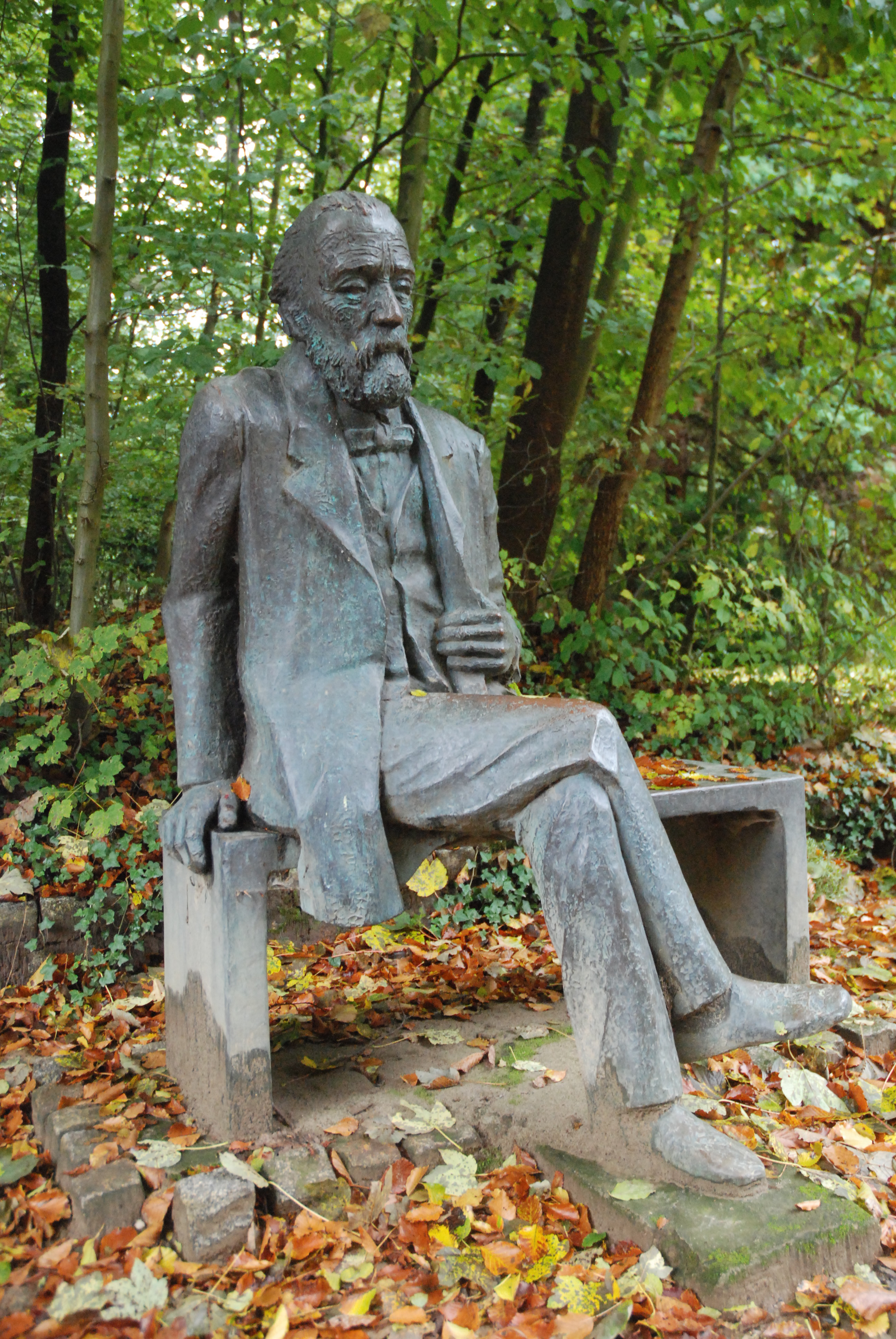
Statue of Theodor Storm in Hanerau (1993)

- Theodor Storm (1817–1888), German writer (1880–1888 in Hademarschen)
- Ingo Kühl (* 1953), German painter, sculptor and architect (1964–1973 in Hademarschen)
