= Nübbel =

- Municipality
- Flag Coat of arms

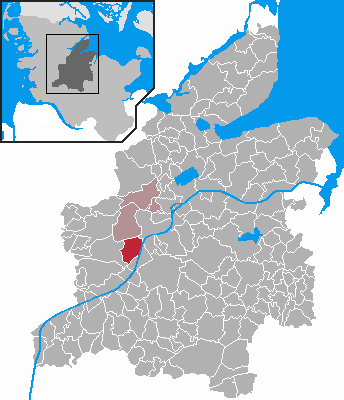
- Location of Nübbel within Rendsburg-Eckernförde district
- Interactive map of Nübbel
- Location within Germany Location within Schleswig-Holstein
- Coordinates: 54°16′27″N 9°37′24″E
- Country: Germany
- State: Schleswig-Holstein
- District: Rendsburg-Eckernförde
- Municipal assoc.: Fockbek

Government
  - Mayor: Rudolf Ehlers

Area
  - Total: 14.02 km^{2} (5.41 sq mi)
- Elevation: 3 m (9.8 ft)

Population (2025-12-31)
  - Total: 1,485
  - Density: 105.9/km^{2} (274.3/sq mi)
- Time zone: UTC+01:00 (CET)
  - Summer (DST): UTC+02:00 (CEST)
- Postal codes: 24809
- Dialling codes: 04331
- Vehicle registration: RD
- Website: www.nuebbel.de

Nübbel (German pronunciation: [ˈnʏbl̩]) is a municipality in the district of Rendsburg-Eckernförde, in Schleswig-Holstein, Germany.

== Notable personalities ==
- Hinrich Romeike, German eventing rider
