= Remmel =

Family name

Remmel is a surname. Notable people with the surname include:

- Cardo Remmel, Estonian sailor and entrepreneur
- Gert Remmel (born 1975), Estonian football player and coach
- Harmon L. Remmel (1856–1927), American politician from Arkansas
- Jeffrey B. Remmel, American mathematician
- Laura Põldvere (nee Remmel), Estonian singer
- Lee Remmel, American sportswriter
- Peter Remmel, German swimmer
- Pratt Remmel (1915–1991), American politician from Arkansas
- Valentine Remmel, American politician

== See also ==
- Remmels
