= Heinkenborstel =

- Municipality
- Coat of arms

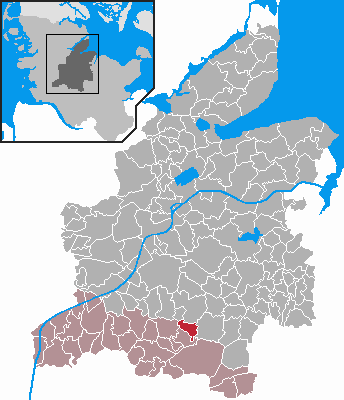
- Location of Heinkenborstel within Rendsburg-Eckernförde district
- Interactive map of Heinkenborstel
- Location within Germany Location within Schleswig-Holstein
- Coordinates: 54°08′N 09°45′E
- Country: Germany
- State: Schleswig-Holstein
- District: Rendsburg-Eckernförde
- Municipal assoc.: Mittelholstein

Government
  - Mayor: Lisa Höcker

Area
  - Total: 7.55 km^{2} (2.92 sq mi)
- Elevation: 44 m (144 ft)

Population (2025-12-31)
  - Total: 147
  - Density: 19.5/km^{2} (50.4/sq mi)
- Time zone: UTC+01:00 (CET)
  - Summer (DST): UTC+02:00 (CEST)
- Postal codes: 24594
- Dialling codes: 04873
- Vehicle registration: RD

Heinkenborstel is a municipality in the district of Rendsburg-Eckernförde, in Schleswig-Holstein, Germany.

The location of Heinkenborstel is south of the municipality of Bargstedt, but north of Mörel, and east of Nindorf, Rendsburg-Eckernförde.
