= Rickert =

- Municipality
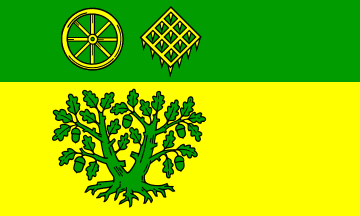
- Flag Coat of arms

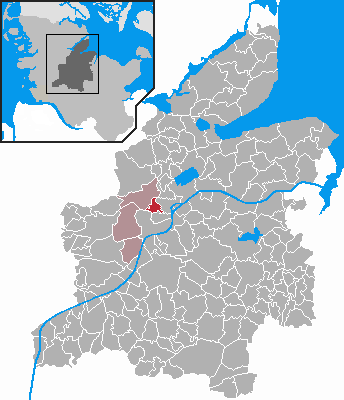
- Location of Rickert within Rendsburg-Eckernförde district
- Interactive map of Rickert
- Location within Germany Location within Schleswig-Holstein
- Coordinates: 54°19′57″N 9°39′51″E
- Country: Germany
- State: Schleswig-Holstein
- District: Rendsburg-Eckernförde
- Municipal assoc.: Fockbek

Government
  - Mayor: Karl-Heinz Boyens

Area
  - Total: 5.52 km^{2} (2.13 sq mi)
- Elevation: 13 m (43 ft)

Population (2025-12-31)
  - Total: 1,009
  - Density: 183/km^{2} (473/sq mi)
- Time zone: UTC+01:00 (CET)
  - Summer (DST): UTC+02:00 (CEST)
- Postal codes: 24782
- Dialling codes: 04331
- Vehicle registration: RD
- Website: www.fockbek.de

Rickert is a municipality in the district of Rendsburg-Eckernförde, in Schleswig-Holstein, Germany.
