= Bargstedt, Schleswig-Holstein =

Bargstedt
- Municipality
- Coat of arms

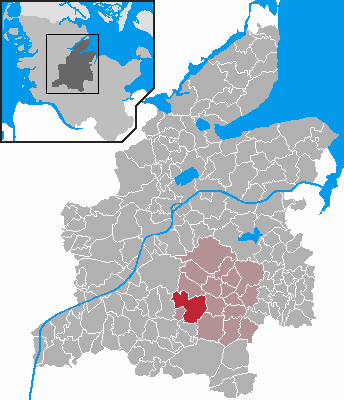
- Location of Bargstedt within Rendsburg-Eckernförde district
- Interactive map of Bargstedt
- Location within Germany Location within Schleswig-Holstein
- Coordinates: 54°10′N 9°46′E
- Country: Germany
- State: Schleswig-Holstein
- District: Rendsburg-Eckernförde
- Municipal assoc.: Nortorfer Land
- Subdivisions: 5

Government
  - Mayor: Robert Struck

Area
  - Total: 25.35 km^{2} (9.79 sq mi)
- Elevation: 26 m (85 ft)

Population (2025-12-31)
  - Total: 756
  - Density: 29.8/km^{2} (77.2/sq mi)
- Time zone: UTC+01:00 (CET)
  - Summer (DST): UTC+02:00 (CEST)
- Postal codes: 24793
- Dialling codes: 04875, 04392
- Vehicle registration: RD
- Website: www.amt-nortorfer- land.de

Bargstedt (German pronunciation: [ˈbaʁkʃtɛt]) is a municipality in the district of Rendsburg-Eckernförde, in Schleswig-Holstein, Germany.

The location of Bargstedt is south of the municipality of Brammer, but north of Heinkenborstel or Gnutz, and east of Luhnstedt.
