= Hamweddel =

- Municipality
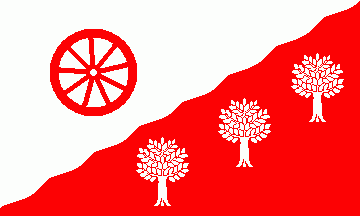
- Flag Coat of arms

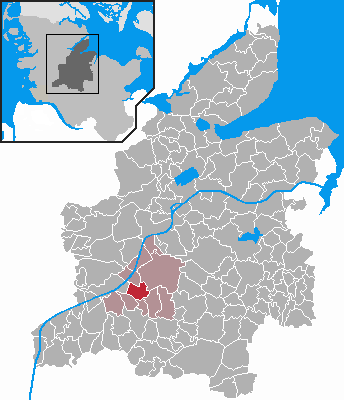
- Location of Hamweddel within Rendsburg-Eckernförde district
- Interactive map of Hamweddel
- Location within Germany Location within Schleswig-Holstein
- Coordinates: 54°11′33″N 9°37′14″E
- Country: Germany
- State: Schleswig-Holstein
- District: Rendsburg-Eckernförde
- Municipal assoc.: Jevenstedt

Government
  - Mayor: Monika Sievers

Area
  - Total: 9.66 km^{2} (3.73 sq mi)
- Elevation: 7 m (23 ft)

Population (2025-12-31)
  - Total: 455
  - Density: 47.1/km^{2} (122/sq mi)
- Time zone: UTC+01:00 (CET)
  - Summer (DST): UTC+02:00 (CEST)
- Postal codes: 24816
- Dialling codes: 04875
- Vehicle registration: RD
- Website: www.amt-jevenstedt.de

Hamweddel is a municipality in the district of Rendsburg-Eckernförde, in Schleswig-Holstein, Germany.
