= Padenstedt =

- Municipality
- Coat of arms

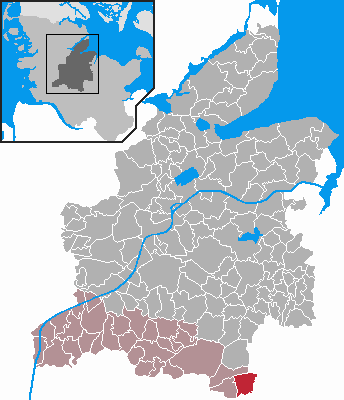
- Location of Padenstedt within Rendsburg-Eckernförde district
- Interactive map of Padenstedt
- Location within Germany Location within Schleswig-Holstein
- Coordinates: 54°3′2″N 9°55′09″E
- Country: Germany
- State: Schleswig-Holstein
- District: Rendsburg-Eckernförde
- Municipal assoc.: Mittelholstein

Government
  - Mayor: Walter Beckmann

Area
  - Total: 14.6 km^{2} (5.6 sq mi)
- Elevation: 14 m (46 ft)

Population (2025-12-31)
  - Total: 1,762
  - Density: 121/km^{2} (313/sq mi)
- Time zone: UTC+01:00 (CET)
  - Summer (DST): UTC+02:00 (CEST)
- Postal codes: 24634
- Dialling codes: 04321
- Vehicle registration: RD
- Website: www.amt-aukrug.de

Padenstedt is a municipality in the district of Rendsburg-Eckernförde, in Schleswig-Holstein, Germany.
