= Bendorf, Schleswig-Holstein =

Bendorf
- Municipality
- Coat of arms

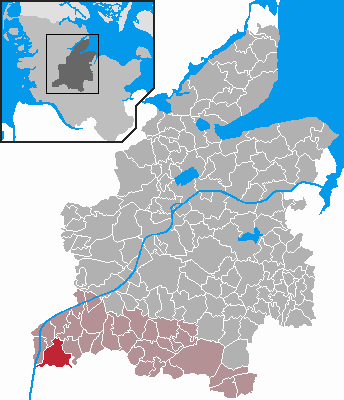
- Location of Bendorf within Rendsburg-Eckernförde district
- Interactive map of Bendorf
- Location within Germany Location within Schleswig-Holstein
- Coordinates: 54°5′14″N 9°22′56″E
- Country: Germany
- State: Schleswig-Holstein
- District: Rendsburg-Eckernförde
- Municipal assoc.: Mittelholstein

Government
  - Mayor: Holger Ott

Area
  - Total: 20.58 km^{2} (7.95 sq mi)
- Elevation: 22 m (72 ft)

Population (2025-12-31)
  - Total: 469
  - Density: 22.8/km^{2} (59.0/sq mi)
- Time zone: UTC+01:00 (CET)
  - Summer (DST): UTC+02:00 (CEST)
- Postal codes: 25557
- Dialling codes: 04827, 04872
- Vehicle registration: RD

Bendorf (German pronunciation: [ˈbɛndɔʁf]) is a municipality in the district of Rendsburg-Eckernförde, in Schleswig-Holstein, Germany.
