= Mittelholstein =

- Amt
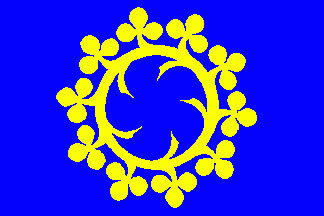
- Flag Coat of arms

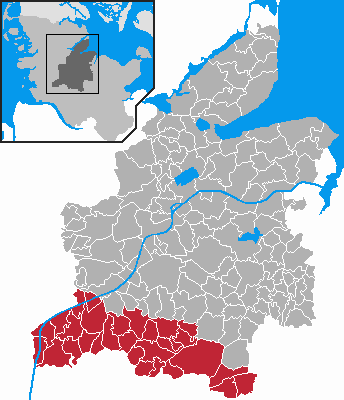
- Map of Rendsburg-Eckernförde highlighting Mittelholstein
- Interactive map of Mittelholstein
- Location within Germany Location within Schleswig-Holstein
- Coordinates: 54°05′N 9°39′E
- Country: Germany
- State: Schleswig-Holstein
- District: Rendsburg-Eckernförde
- Seat: Hohenwestedt
- Subdivisions: 30 municipalities

Government
  - Mayor: Carsten Klug

Area
  - Total: 380.9 km^{2} (147.1 sq mi)

Population (2025-12-31)
  - Total: 24,364
  - Density: 63.96/km^{2} (165.7/sq mi)
- Time zone: UTC+01:00 (CET)
  - Summer (DST): UTC+02:00 (CEST)
- Website: www.amt-mittelholstein.de

Mittelholstein ("central Holstein") is an Amt ("collective municipality") in the district of Rendsburg-Eckernförde, in Schleswig-Holstein, Germany. It was formed on 1 January 2012 from the three former Ämter Aukrug, Hanerau-Hademarschen and Hohenwestedt-Land and the municipality Hohenwestedt. The seat of the Amt is in Hohenwestedt.

The Amt Mittelholstein consists of the following municipalities:

1. Arpsdorf
2. Aukrug
3. Beldorf
4. Bendorf
5. Beringstedt
6. Bornholt
7. Ehndorf
8. Gokels
9. Grauel
10. Hanerau-Hademarschen
11. Heinkenborstel
12. Hohenwestedt
13. Jahrsdorf
14. Lütjenwestedt
15. Oldenbüttel
16. Meezen
17. Mörel
18. Nienborstel
19. Nindorf
20. Osterstedt
21. Padenstedt
22. Rade bei Hohenwestedt
23. Remmels
24. Seefeld
25. Steenfeld
26. Tackesdorf
27. Tappendorf
28. Thaden
29. Todenbüttel
30. Wapelfeld
