= Wapelfeld =

- Municipality
- Coat of arms

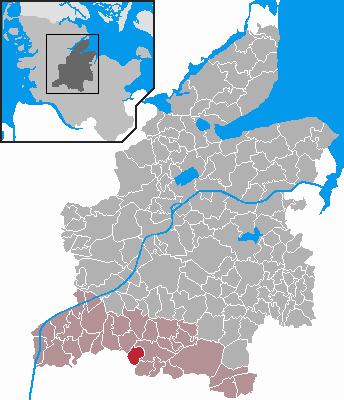
- Location of Wapelfeld within Rendsburg-Eckernförde district
- Interactive map of Wapelfeld
- Location within Germany Location within Schleswig-Holstein
- Coordinates: 54°4′N 9°35′E
- Country: Germany
- State: Schleswig-Holstein
- District: Rendsburg-Eckernförde
- Municipal assoc.: Mittelholstein

Government
  - Mayor: Volker Delfs

Area
  - Total: 8.11 km^{2} (3.13 sq mi)
- Elevation: 14 m (46 ft)

Population (2025-12-31)
  - Total: 310
  - Density: 38/km^{2} (99/sq mi)
- Time zone: UTC+01:00 (CET)
  - Summer (DST): UTC+02:00 (CEST)
- Postal codes: 24594
- Dialling codes: 04871
- Vehicle registration: RD

Wapelfeld is a municipality in the district of Rendsburg-Eckernförde, in Schleswig-Holstein, Germany.
