= Beldorf =

- Municipality
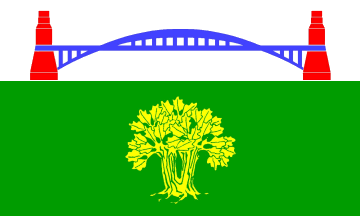
- Flag Coat of arms

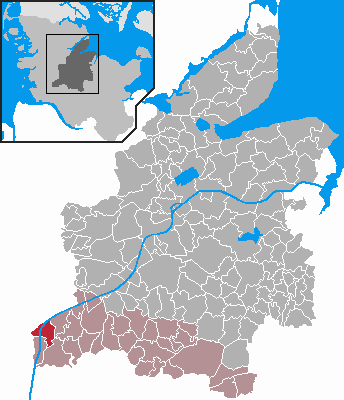
- Location of Beldorf within Rendsburg-Eckernförde district
- Interactive map of Beldorf
- Location within Germany Location within Schleswig-Holstein
- Coordinates: 54°7′38″N 9°21′23″E
- Country: Germany
- State: Schleswig-Holstein
- District: Rendsburg-Eckernförde
- Municipal assoc.: Mittelholstein

Government
  - Mayor: Jens Beckmann

Area
  - Total: 12 km^{2} (4.6 sq mi)
- Elevation: 38 m (125 ft)

Population (2025-12-31)
  - Total: 277
  - Density: 23/km^{2} (60/sq mi)
- Time zone: UTC+01:00 (CET)
  - Summer (DST): UTC+02:00 (CEST)
- Postal codes: 25557
- Dialling codes: 04835, 04872
- Vehicle registration: RD

Beldorf is a municipality in the district of Rendsburg-Eckernförde, in Schleswig-Holstein, Germany.
