= Gnutz =

- Municipality
- Coat of arms

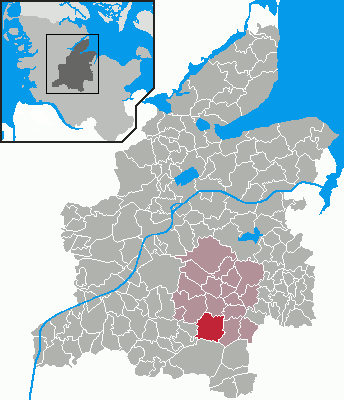
- Location of Gnutz within Rendsburg-Eckernförde district
- Interactive map of Gnutz
- Location within Germany Location within Schleswig-Holstein
- Coordinates: 54°7′N 9°49′E
- Country: Germany
- State: Schleswig-Holstein
- District: Rendsburg-Eckernförde
- Municipal assoc.: Nortorfer Land

Government
  - Mayor: Markus Mehrens

Area
  - Total: 22.93 km^{2} (8.85 sq mi)
- Elevation: 24 m (79 ft)

Population (2025-12-31)
  - Total: 1,219
  - Density: 53.16/km^{2} (137.7/sq mi)
- Time zone: UTC+01:00 (CET)
  - Summer (DST): UTC+02:00 (CEST)
- Postal codes: 24622
- Dialling codes: 04392
- Vehicle registration: RD
- Website: www.amt-nortorfer- land.de

Gnutz is a municipality in the district of Rendsburg-Eckernförde, in Schleswig-Holstein, Germany.

The location of Gnutz is south of the nearby municipality of Bargstedt or Nortorf, but north of Aukrug, and west of Timmaspe.
