= Osterstedt =

- Municipality
- Coat of arms

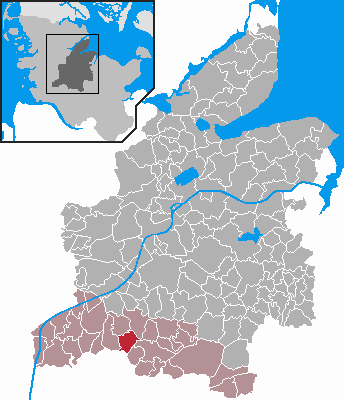
- Location of Osterstedt within Rendsburg-Eckernförde district
- Interactive map of Osterstedt
- Location within Germany Location within Schleswig-Holstein
- Coordinates: 54°7′N 9°34′E
- Country: Germany
- State: Schleswig-Holstein
- District: Rendsburg-Eckernförde
- Municipal assoc.: Mittelholstein

Government
  - Mayor: Frank Schmidt

Area
  - Total: 10.95 km^{2} (4.23 sq mi)
- Elevation: 11 m (36 ft)

Population (2025-12-31)
  - Total: 653
  - Density: 59.6/km^{2} (154/sq mi)
- Time zone: UTC+01:00 (CET)
  - Summer (DST): UTC+02:00 (CEST)
- Postal codes: 25590
- Dialling codes: 04874
- Vehicle registration: RD

Osterstedt is a municipality in the district of Rendsburg-Eckernförde, in Schleswig-Holstein, Germany.
