= Cardo Remmel =

Estonian sport personnel and entrepreneur (1953–2018)

Cardo Remmel (9 May 1953 Pärnu – 11 May 2018 Tallinn) was an Estonian sport personnel and entrepreneur.

In 1976 he graduated from Tallinn Polytechnical Institute.

In 1970s he become Estonian champion in sailing (class Folkboot) and in high sea sailing (Estonian: avamerepurjetamine).

Since 1999 he was a member of Estonian Olympic Committee. 2005-2009 he was the president of Estonian Golf Federation.

1983-2005 he was at different posts in the company Saku Brewery, including its executive director. 2005-2006 he was vice-mayor of Pärnu.

Awards:

- 2005: Order of the White Star, IV class.
