= Steenfeld =

- Municipality
- Coat of arms

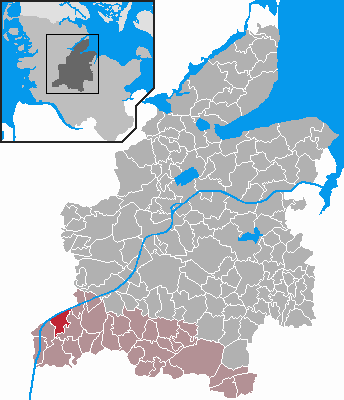
- Location of Steenfeld within Rendsburg-Eckernförde district
- Interactive map of Steenfeld
- Location within Germany Location within Schleswig-Holstein
- Coordinates: 54°8′39″N 9°22′59″E
- Country: Germany
- State: Schleswig-Holstein
- District: Rendsburg-Eckernförde
- Municipal assoc.: Mittelholstein

Government
  - Mayor: Claus Scheel (CDU)

Area
  - Total: 11.02 km^{2} (4.25 sq mi)
- Elevation: 19 m (62 ft)

Population (2025-12-31)
  - Total: 309
  - Density: 28.0/km^{2} (72.6/sq mi)
- Time zone: UTC+01:00 (CET)
  - Summer (DST): UTC+02:00 (CEST)
- Postal codes: 25557
- Dialling codes: 04872
- Vehicle registration: RD

Steenfeld is a municipality in the district of Rendsburg-Eckernförde, in Schleswig-Holstein, Germany.
