= Seefeld, Schleswig-Holstein =

Seefeld
- Municipality
- Coat of arms

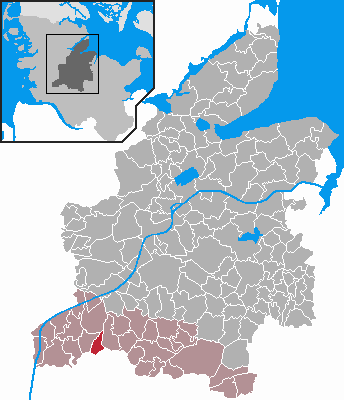
- Location of Seefeld within Rendsburg-Eckernförde district
- Interactive map of Seefeld
- Location within Germany Location within Schleswig-Holstein
- Coordinates: 54°1′N 9°28′E
- Country: Germany
- State: Schleswig-Holstein
- District: Rendsburg-Eckernförde
- Municipal assoc.: Mittelholstein

Government
  - Mayor: Markus Kröger (CDU)

Area
  - Total: 6.77 km^{2} (2.61 sq mi)
- Elevation: 39 m (128 ft)

Population (2025-12-31)
  - Total: 317
  - Density: 46.8/km^{2} (121/sq mi)
- Time zone: UTC+01:00 (CET)
  - Summer (DST): UTC+02:00 (CEST)
- Postal codes: 25557
- Dialling codes: 04872
- Vehicle registration: RD

Seefeld (German pronunciation: [ˈzeːfɛlt]) is a municipality in the district of Rendsburg-Eckernförde, in Schleswig-Holstein, Germany.
