= Tönsheide Forest =

Coordinates: 54°03′24″N 9°46′24″E

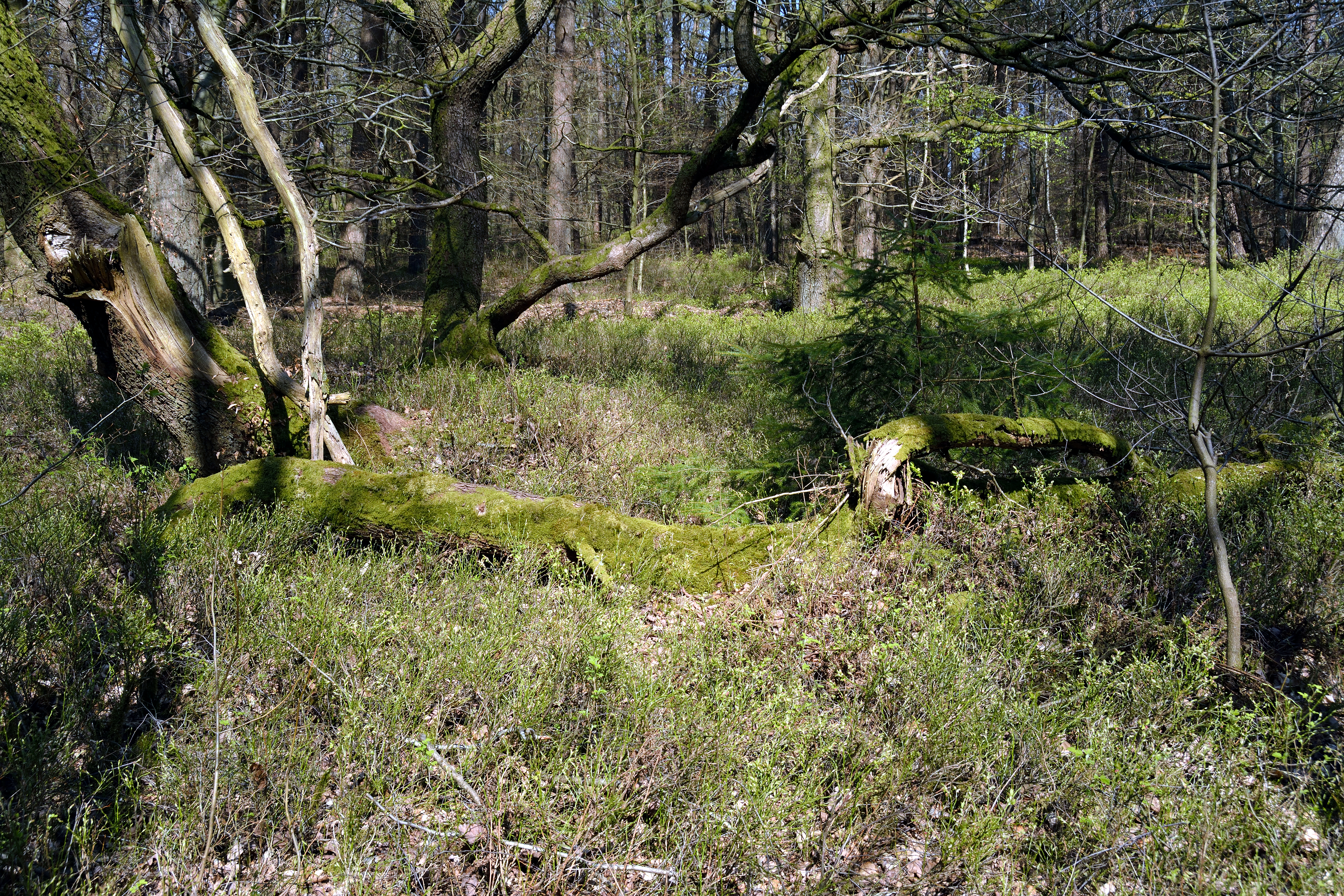
Tönsheide Forest

The Tönsheide Forest (German: Tönsheider Wald) is a nature reserve near the village of Aukrug east of Neumünster in the north German state of Schleswig-Holstein.

The nature reserve has an area of 67 hectares (170 acres) and lies east of Aukrug specialist hospital. It consists of large areas of near-natural woodland, scattered with areas of heath. In the woods are the source area and upper reaches of the Sellbek.
