= Jahrsdorf =

- Municipality
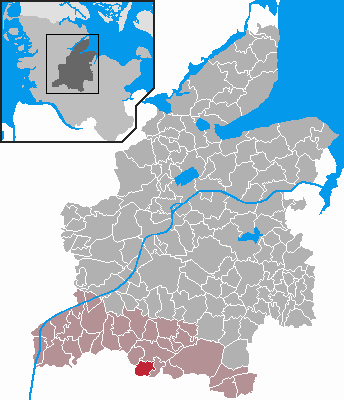
- Location of Jahrsdorf within Rendsburg-Eckernförde district
- Interactive map of Jahrsdorf
- Location within Germany Location within Schleswig-Holstein
- Coordinates: 54°4′N 9°38′E
- Country: Germany
- State: Schleswig-Holstein
- District: Rendsburg-Eckernförde
- Municipal assoc.: Mittelholstein

Government
  - Mayor: Klaus Bruhn

Area
  - Total: 8.77 km^{2} (3.39 sq mi)
- Elevation: 38 m (125 ft)

Population (2025-12-31)
  - Total: 234
  - Density: 26.7/km^{2} (69.1/sq mi)
- Time zone: UTC+01:00 (CET)
  - Summer (DST): UTC+02:00 (CEST)
- Postal codes: 24594
- Dialling codes: 04871
- Vehicle registration: RD

Jahrsdorf (German pronunciation: [ˈjaːɐ̯sdɔʁf]) is a municipality in the district of Rendsburg-Eckernförde, in Schleswig-Holstein, Germany.
