= Stafstedt =

- Municipality
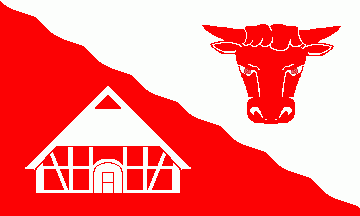
- Flag Coat of arms

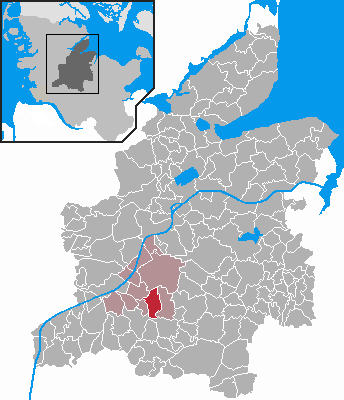
- Location of Stafstedt within Rendsburg-Eckernförde district
- Interactive map of Stafstedt
- Location within Germany Location within Schleswig-Holstein
- Coordinates: 54°10′N 9°40′E
- Country: Germany
- State: Schleswig-Holstein
- District: Rendsburg-Eckernförde
- Municipal assoc.: Jevenstedt

Government
  - Mayor: Hans Hinrich Neve

Area
  - Total: 11.83 km^{2} (4.57 sq mi)
- Elevation: 19 m (62 ft)

Population (2025-12-31)
  - Total: 370
  - Density: 31/km^{2} (81/sq mi)
- Time zone: UTC+01:00 (CET)
  - Summer (DST): UTC+02:00 (CEST)
- Postal codes: 24808
- Dialling codes: 04875
- Vehicle registration: RD
- Website: www.amt-jevenstedt.de

Stafstedt is a municipality in the district of Rendsburg-Eckernförde, in Schleswig-Holstein, Germany.

== People from Stafstedt ==
- Günther Fielmann (born 1939), german businessman
