= Krogaspe =

- Municipality
- Coat of arms

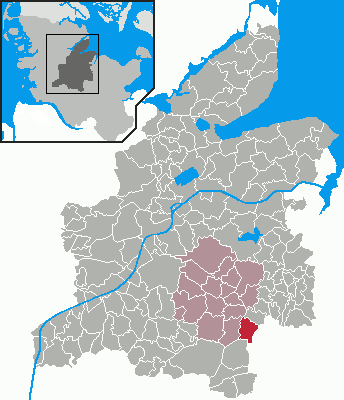
- Location of Krogaspe within Rendsburg-Eckernförde district
- Interactive map of Krogaspe
- Location within Germany Location within Schleswig-Holstein
- Coordinates: 54°7′N 9°55′E
- Country: Germany
- State: Schleswig-Holstein
- District: Rendsburg-Eckernförde
- Municipal assoc.: Nortorfer Land

Government
  - Mayor: Nils Höfer

Area
  - Total: 11.82 km^{2} (4.56 sq mi)
- Elevation: 27 m (89 ft)

Population (2025-12-31)
  - Total: 457
  - Density: 38.7/km^{2} (100/sq mi)
- Time zone: UTC+01:00 (CET)
  - Summer (DST): UTC+02:00 (CEST)
- Postal codes: 24644
- Dialling codes: 04392
- Vehicle registration: RD
- Website: www.amt-nortorfer- land.de

Krogaspe is a municipality in the district of Rendsburg-Eckernförde, in Schleswig-Holstein, Germany. Krogaspe is located north west of Neumünster close to Autobahn A7 and county highway 205 to Rendsburg.

== History ==
Krogaspe was first mentioned in 1200 AD. The meaning of name is remote corner village with aspen. It is an indication that Krogaspe was a medieval settlement surrounded by poplar aspen.

The municipality is located on the historic military and trade route Ossenweg. Thousands of cattle have been driven down this old path through Schleswig-Holstein south towards the river Elbe.

In 1979, retired farmer Hinrich Plambeck released a chronicle of Krogaspe.

== Politics ==
The municipal council is made up of 5 seats for the voter coop ADW and 4 seats for the voter coop KWG.

=== Coat of arms ===
blazon: „Three green Espen trees next to each other above the red colored gable end of a lower-saxon timber frame farm house on a silver background"
