= Gokels =

- Municipality
- Coat of arms

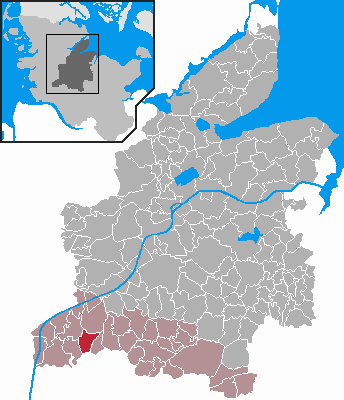
- Location of Gokels within Rendsburg-Eckernförde district
- Interactive map of Gokels
- Location within Germany Location within Schleswig-Holstein
- Coordinates: 54°7′N 9°28′E
- Country: Germany
- State: Schleswig-Holstein
- District: Rendsburg-Eckernförde
- Municipal assoc.: Mittelholstein

Government
  - Mayor: Heiko Hadenfeldt

Area
  - Total: 10.64 km^{2} (4.11 sq mi)
- Elevation: 10 m (33 ft)

Population (2025-12-31)
  - Total: 572
  - Density: 53.8/km^{2} (139/sq mi)
- Time zone: UTC+01:00 (CET)
  - Summer (DST): UTC+02:00 (CEST)
- Postal codes: 25557
- Dialling codes: 04872
- Vehicle registration: RD

Gokels (German pronunciation: [ˈɡoːkl̩s]) is a municipality in the district of Rendsburg-Eckernförde, in Schleswig-Holstein, Germany.
