= Lütjenwestedt =

- Municipality
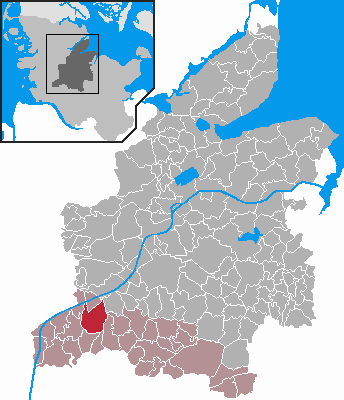
- Location of Lütjenwestedt within Rendsburg-Eckernförde district
- Interactive map of Lütjenwestedt
- Location within Germany Location within Schleswig-Holstein
- Coordinates: 54°8′N 9°29′E
- Country: Germany
- State: Schleswig-Holstein
- District: Rendsburg-Eckernförde
- Municipal assoc.: Mittelholstein

Government
  - Mayor: Björn Baasch

Area
  - Total: 22.31 km^{2} (8.61 sq mi)
- Elevation: 16 m (52 ft)

Population (2025-12-31)
  - Total: 530
  - Density: 24/km^{2} (62/sq mi)
- Time zone: UTC+01:00 (CET)
  - Summer (DST): UTC+02:00 (CEST)
- Postal codes: 25585
- Dialling codes: 04872
- Vehicle registration: RD

Lütjenwestedt is a municipality in the district of Rendsburg-Eckernförde, in Schleswig-Holstein, Germany.
