= Embühren =

- Municipality
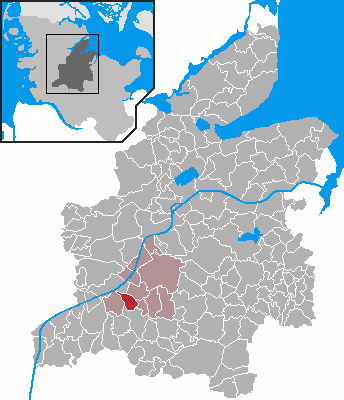
- Location of Embühren within Rendsburg-Eckernförde district
- Interactive map of Embühren
- Location within Germany Location within Schleswig-Holstein
- Coordinates: 54°10′N 9°35′E
- Country: Germany
- State: Schleswig-Holstein
- District: Rendsburg-Eckernförde
- Municipal assoc.: Jevenstedt

Government
  - Mayor: Hermann Ratjen

Area
  - Total: 7.45 km^{2} (2.88 sq mi)
- Elevation: 33 m (108 ft)

Population (2025-12-31)
  - Total: 190
  - Density: 26/km^{2} (66/sq mi)
- Time zone: UTC+01:00 (CET)
  - Summer (DST): UTC+02:00 (CEST)
- Postal codes: 24819
- Dialling codes: 04875
- Vehicle registration: RD
- Website: www.amt-jevenstedt.de

Embühren (German pronunciation: [ɛmˈbyːʁən]) is a municipality in the district of Rendsburg-Eckernförde, in Schleswig-Holstein, Germany.
