= Bornholt =

- Municipality
- Coat of arms

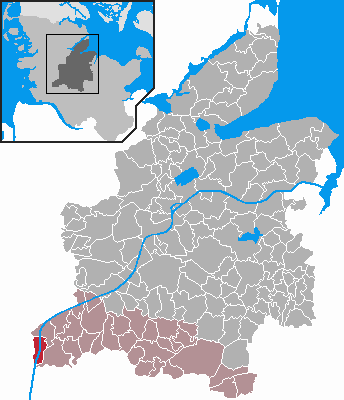
- Location of Bornholt within Rendsburg-Eckernförde district
- Interactive map of Bornholt
- Location within Germany Location within Schleswig-Holstein
- Coordinates: 54°6′N 9°20′E
- Country: Germany
- State: Schleswig-Holstein
- District: Rendsburg-Eckernförde
- Municipal assoc.: Mittelholstein

Government
  - Mayor: Volker Timm

Area
  - Total: 11 km^{2} (4.2 sq mi)
- Elevation: 21 m (69 ft)

Population (2025-12-31)
  - Total: 178
  - Density: 16/km^{2} (42/sq mi)
- Time zone: UTC+01:00 (CET)
  - Summer (DST): UTC+02:00 (CEST)
- Postal codes: 25557
- Dialling codes: 04872
- Vehicle registration: RD

Bornholt is a municipality in the district of Rendsburg-Eckernförde, in Schleswig-Holstein, Germany.

After the local elections in 2013 Wählergemeinschaft KWG holds all seven municipal seats.
