= Thaden =

- Municipality
- Coat of arms

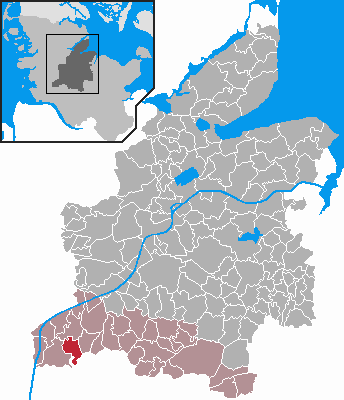
- Location of Thaden within Rendsburg-Eckernförde district
- Interactive map of Thaden
- Location within Germany Location within Schleswig-Holstein
- Coordinates: 54°6′19″N 9°25′25″E
- Country: Germany
- State: Schleswig-Holstein
- District: Rendsburg-Eckernförde
- Municipal assoc.: Mittelholstein

Government
  - Mayor: Klaus-Heinrich Bünz

Area
  - Total: 11.98 km^{2} (4.63 sq mi)
- Elevation: 22 m (72 ft)

Population (2025-12-31)
  - Total: 237
  - Density: 19.8/km^{2} (51.2/sq mi)
- Time zone: UTC+01:00 (CET)
  - Summer (DST): UTC+02:00 (CEST)
- Postal codes: 25557
- Dialling codes: 04872
- Vehicle registration: RD

Thaden (German pronunciation: [ˈtaːdn̩]) is a municipality in the district of Rendsburg-Eckernförde, in Schleswig-Holstein, Germany.

== Geography ==
Thaden is located about 25 km southeast of Heide in a rural environment. North of the community runs the Kiel Canal, about 11 km south of the federal highway 430 from Neumünster towards Meldorf and about 12 km southwest of the Federal Highway 23 from Hamburg to Heide.
