= Oldenhütten =

- Municipality
- Coat of arms

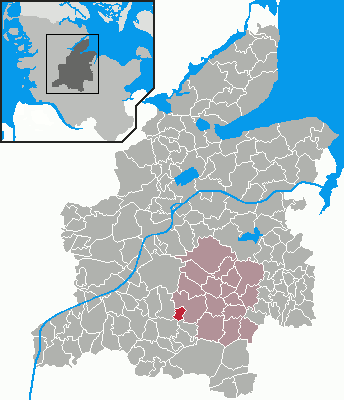
- Location of Oldenhütten within Rendsburg-Eckernförde district
- Interactive map of Oldenhütten
- Location within Germany Location within Schleswig-Holstein
- Coordinates: 54°8′N 9°43′E
- Country: Germany
- State: Schleswig-Holstein
- District: Rendsburg-Eckernförde
- Municipal assoc.: Nortorfer Land

Government
  - Mayor: Klaus Rathjen

Area
  - Total: 4.33 km^{2} (1.67 sq mi)
- Elevation: 43 m (141 ft)

Population (2025-12-31)
  - Total: 164
  - Density: 37.9/km^{2} (98.1/sq mi)
- Time zone: UTC+01:00 (CET)
  - Summer (DST): UTC+02:00 (CEST)
- Postal codes: 24793
- Dialling codes: 04392
- Vehicle registration: RD
- Website: www.amt-nortorfer- land.de

Oldenhütten is a municipality in the district of Rendsburg-Eckernförde, in Schleswig-Holstein, Germany.
