= Todenbüttel =

- Municipality
- Coat of arms

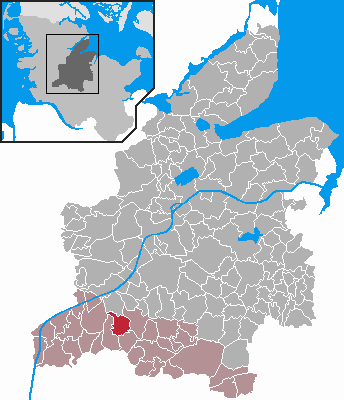
- Location of Todenbüttel within Rendsburg-Eckernförde district
- Interactive map of Todenbüttel
- Location within Germany Location within Schleswig-Holstein
- Coordinates: 54°8′N 9°33′E
- Country: Germany
- State: Schleswig-Holstein
- District: Rendsburg-Eckernförde
- Municipal assoc.: Mittelholstein

Government
  - Mayor: Otto Harders

Area
  - Total: 11.78 km^{2} (4.55 sq mi)
- Elevation: 18 m (59 ft)

Population (2025-12-31)
  - Total: 1,082
  - Density: 91.85/km^{2} (237.9/sq mi)
- Time zone: UTC+01:00 (CET)
  - Summer (DST): UTC+02:00 (CEST)
- Postal codes: 24819
- Dialling codes: 04874
- Vehicle registration: RD
- Website: www.todenbuettel.de

Todenbüttel is a municipality in the district of Rendsburg-Eckernförde, in Schleswig-Holstein, Germany.
