= Beringstedt =

- Municipality
- Coat of arms

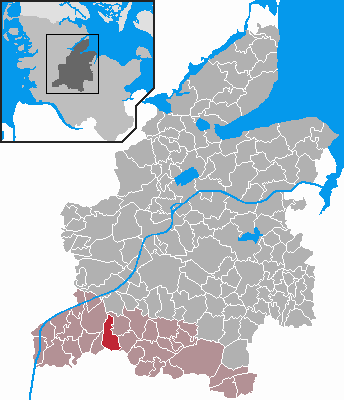
- Location of Beringstedt within Rendsburg-Eckernförde district
- Interactive map of Beringstedt
- Location within Germany Location within Schleswig-Holstein
- Coordinates: 54°11′N 9°32′E
- Country: Germany
- State: Schleswig-Holstein
- District: Rendsburg-Eckernförde
- Municipal assoc.: Mittelholstein

Government
  - Mayor: Sönke Rohwer (CDU)

Area
  - Total: 14.29 km^{2} (5.52 sq mi)
- Elevation: 14 m (46 ft)

Population (2025-12-31)
  - Total: 716
  - Density: 50.1/km^{2} (130/sq mi)
- Time zone: UTC+01:00 (CET)
  - Summer (DST): UTC+02:00 (CEST)
- Postal codes: 25575
- Dialling codes: 04874
- Vehicle registration: RD

Beringstedt is a municipality in the district of Rendsburg-Eckernförde, in Schleswig-Holstein, Germany.

== History ==
Beringstedt is located about 29 kilometers south south west of Rendsburg, former capital of the County of Holstein-Rendsburg from 1290 to 1459. Beringstedt is about 50 kilometers by the old roads southwest of Kiel, which became the capital of the Duchy of Holstein-Gottorp in 1720. The Duchy of Holstein was annexed to the Kingdom of Prussia by decree on 24 December 1866. In 1867 Beringstedt was included in the newly established district of Rendsburg, following the Prussian creation of the Province of Schleswig-Holstein. The boundaries of the district of Rendsburg either coincidentally or purposely were similar to those of the old county. Beringstedt's present district of Rendsburg-Eckernförde was established in 1970 by merging the districts of Rendsburg and Eckernförde.
