= Tackesdorf =

- Municipality
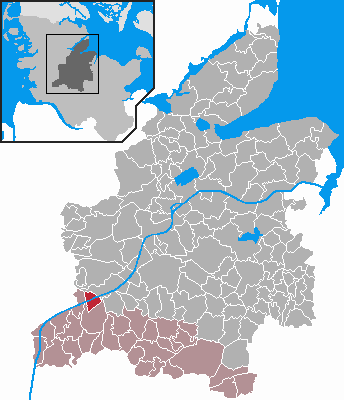
- Location of Tackesdorf within Rendsburg-Eckernförde district
- Interactive map of Tackesdorf
- Location within Germany Location within Schleswig-Holstein
- Coordinates: 54°11′N 9°29′E
- Country: Germany
- State: Schleswig-Holstein
- District: Rendsburg-Eckernförde
- Municipal assoc.: Mittelholstein

Government
  - Mayor: Gerd Melzer

Area
  - Total: 7.65 km^{2} (2.95 sq mi)
- Elevation: 4 m (13 ft)

Population (2025-12-31)
  - Total: 74
  - Density: 9.7/km^{2} (25/sq mi)
- Time zone: UTC+01:00 (CET)
  - Summer (DST): UTC+02:00 (CEST)
- Postal codes: 25585
- Dialling codes: 04872
- Vehicle registration: RD

Tackesdorf is a municipality in the district of Rendsburg-Eckernförde, in Schleswig-Holstein, Germany.
