= Rade, Steinburg =

Rade
- Municipality
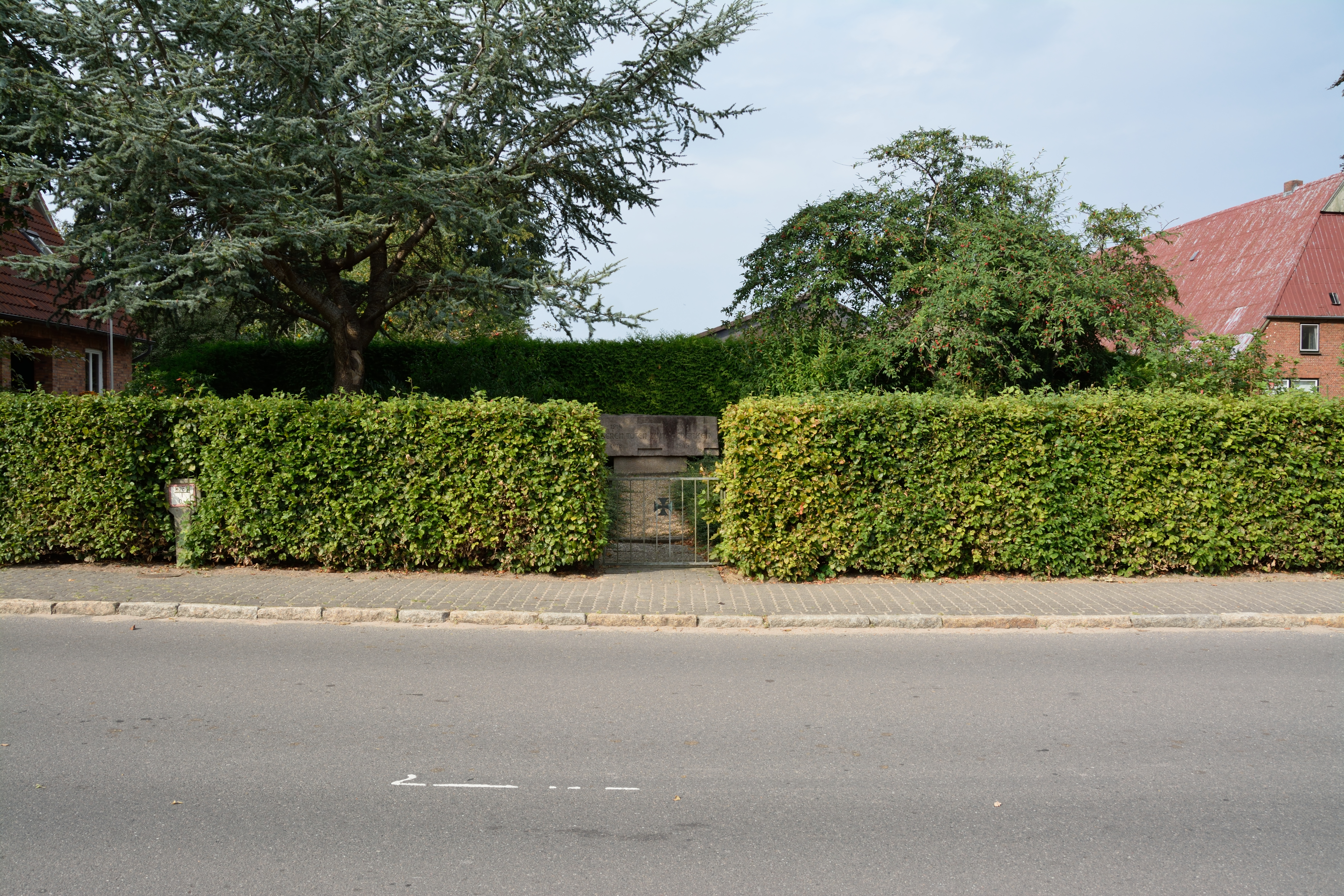
- A road in Rade with the memorial to its dead in the two world wars

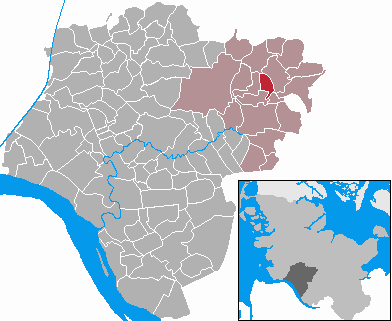
- Location of Rade within Steinburg district
- Interactive map of Rade
- Location within Germany Location within Schleswig-Holstein
- Coordinates: 54°0′N 9°45′E
- Country: Germany
- State: Schleswig-Holstein
- District: Steinburg
- Municipal assoc.: Kellinghusen

Government
  - Mayor: Hinnerk Egge

Area
  - Total: 3.92 km^{2} (1.51 sq mi)
- Elevation: 6 m (20 ft)

Population (2025-12-31)
  - Total: 101
  - Density: 25.8/km^{2} (66.7/sq mi)
- Time zone: UTC+01:00 (CET)
  - Summer (DST): UTC+02:00 (CEST)
- Postal codes: 25579
- Dialling codes: 04877
- Vehicle registration: IZ
- Website: www.kellinghusen.de

Rade (German pronunciation: [ˈʁaːdə]) is a municipality in the district of Steinburg in Schleswig-Holstein, Germany.

== Geography ==
The village is located in Aukrug Nature Park, 5 km in north of Kellinghusen, 18 km in southwest of Neumünster, 20 km in northeast of Itzehoe, and 65 km in north of Hamburg. The rivers Stör, Bullenbach, and Kirchweddelbach, flow into its municipal territory.

== Main sights ==
- The Low German house "Gut Karolinenthal", at Dorfstraße 22
