= Remmels =

- Municipality
- Coat of arms

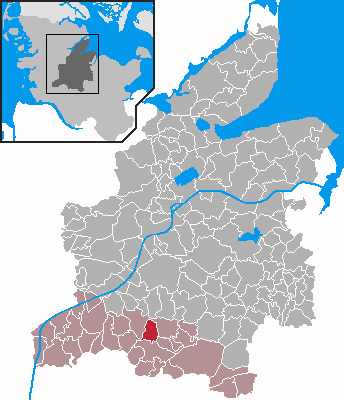
- Location of Remmels within Rendsburg-Eckernförde district
- Interactive map of Remmels
- Location within Germany Location within Schleswig-Holstein
- Coordinates: 54°7′N 9°39′E
- Country: Germany
- State: Schleswig-Holstein
- District: Rendsburg-Eckernförde
- Municipal assoc.: Mittelholstein

Government
  - Mayor: Klaus Treede-Vierth

Area
  - Total: 9.49 km^{2} (3.66 sq mi)
- Elevation: 31 m (102 ft)

Population (2025-12-31)
  - Total: 505
  - Density: 53.2/km^{2} (138/sq mi)
- Time zone: UTC+01:00 (CET)
  - Summer (DST): UTC+02:00 (CEST)
- Postal codes: 24594
- Dialling codes: 04871
- Vehicle registration: RD
- Website: www.remmels.de

Remmels is a municipality in the district of Rendsburg-Eckernförde, in Schleswig-Holstein, Germany of about 3.66 square miles with a population of 430 as of 12/31/2013.

== See also ==
- Remmel
