= Luhnstedt =

- Municipality
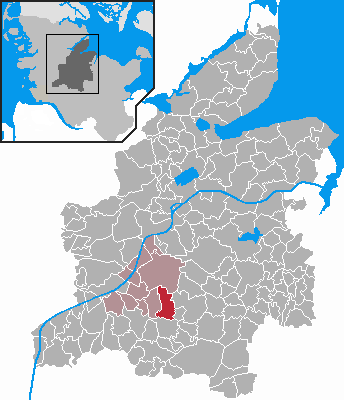
- Location of Luhnstedt within Rendsburg-Eckernförde district
- Interactive map of Luhnstedt
- Location within Germany Location within Schleswig-Holstein
- Coordinates: 54°10′N 9°42′E
- Country: Germany
- State: Schleswig-Holstein
- District: Rendsburg-Eckernförde
- Municipal assoc.: Jevenstedt

Government
  - Mayor: Hans-Heinrich Reimer

Area
  - Total: 15.34 km^{2} (5.92 sq mi)
- Elevation: 30 m (98 ft)

Population (2025-12-31)
  - Total: 374
  - Density: 24.4/km^{2} (63.1/sq mi)
- Time zone: UTC+01:00 (CET)
  - Summer (DST): UTC+02:00 (CEST)
- Postal codes: 24816
- Dialling codes: 04875
- Vehicle registration: RD
- Website: www.amt-jevenstedt.de

Luhnstedt (German pronunciation: [ˈluːnʃtɛt]) is a municipality in the district of Rendsburg-Eckernförde, in Schleswig-Holstein, Germany.
