= Nienborstel =

- Municipality
- Coat of arms

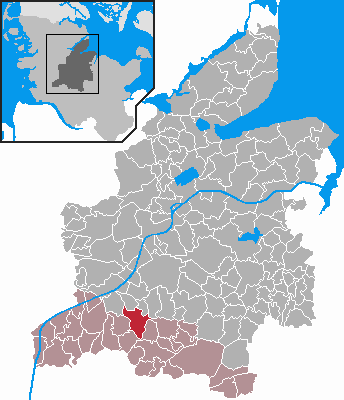
- Location of Nienborstel within Rendsburg-Eckernförde district
- Interactive map of Nienborstel
- Location within Germany Location within Schleswig-Holstein
- Coordinates: 54°8′N 9°37′E
- Country: Germany
- State: Schleswig-Holstein
- District: Rendsburg-Eckernförde
- Municipal assoc.: Mittelholstein

Government
  - Mayor: Uwe Reimers

Area
  - Total: 16.37 km^{2} (6.32 sq mi)
- Elevation: 16 m (52 ft)

Population (2025-12-31)
  - Total: 604
  - Density: 36.9/km^{2} (95.6/sq mi)
- Time zone: UTC+01:00 (CET)
  - Summer (DST): UTC+02:00 (CEST)
- Postal codes: 24819
- Dialling codes: 04871 + 04874 + 04875
- Vehicle registration: RD

Nienborstel is a municipality in the district of Rendsburg-Eckernförde, in Schleswig-Holstein, Germany.
