= Tappendorf =

- Municipality
- Coat of arms

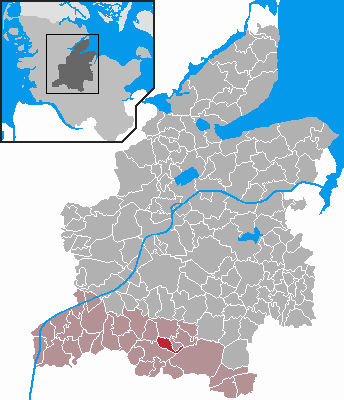
- Location of Tappendorf within Rendsburg-Eckernförde district
- Interactive map of Tappendorf
- Location within Germany Location within Schleswig-Holstein
- Coordinates: 54°6′N 9°41′E
- Country: Germany
- State: Schleswig-Holstein
- District: Rendsburg-Eckernförde
- Municipal assoc.: Mittelholstein

Government
  - Mayor: Georg Türk

Area
  - Total: 6.69 km^{2} (2.58 sq mi)
- Elevation: 60 m (200 ft)

Population (2025-12-31)
  - Total: 325
  - Density: 48.6/km^{2} (126/sq mi)
- Time zone: UTC+01:00 (CET)
  - Summer (DST): UTC+02:00 (CEST)
- Postal codes: 24594
- Dialling codes: 04871
- Vehicle registration: RD

Tappendorf (German pronunciation: [ˈtapn̩dɔʁf]) is a municipality in the district of Rendsburg-Eckernförde, in Schleswig-Holstein, Germany.
