= Grauel =

- Municipality
- Coat of arms

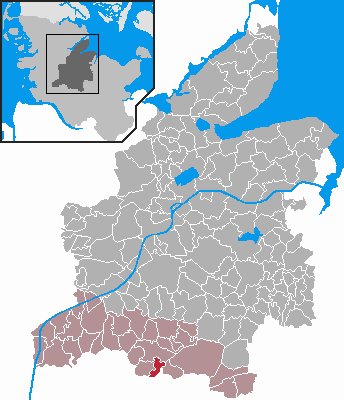
- Location of Grauel within Rendsburg-Eckernförde district
- Interactive map of Grauel
- Location within Germany Location within Schleswig-Holstein
- Coordinates: 54°4′N 9°40′E
- Country: Germany
- State: Schleswig-Holstein
- District: Rendsburg-Eckernförde
- Municipal assoc.: Mittelholstein

Government
  - Mayor: Friedrich Flügge

Area
  - Total: 5.73 km^{2} (2.21 sq mi)
- Elevation: 19 m (62 ft)

Population (2025-12-31)
  - Total: 267
  - Density: 46.6/km^{2} (121/sq mi)
- Time zone: UTC+01:00 (CET)
  - Summer (DST): UTC+02:00 (CEST)
- Postal codes: 24594
- Dialling codes: 04871
- Vehicle registration: RD

Grauel is a municipality in the district of Rendsburg-Eckernförde, in Schleswig-Holstein, Germany.
