= Arpsdorf =

- Municipality
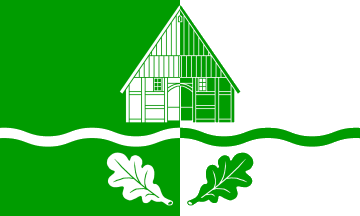
- Flag Coat of arms

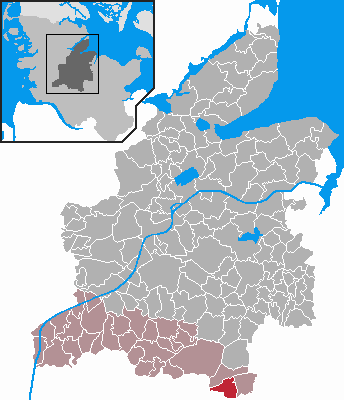
- Location of Arpsdorf within Rendsburg-Eckernförde district
- Interactive map of Arpsdorf
- Location within Germany Location within Schleswig-Holstein
- Coordinates: 54°1′N 9°52′E
- Country: Germany
- State: Schleswig-Holstein
- District: Rendsburg-Eckernförde
- Municipal assoc.: Mittelholstein

Government
  - Mayor: Peter Thomsen

Area
  - Total: 12.1 km^{2} (4.7 sq mi)
- Elevation: 12 m (39 ft)

Population (2025-12-31)
  - Total: 340
  - Density: 28/km^{2} (73/sq mi)
- Time zone: UTC+01:00 (CET)
  - Summer (DST): UTC+02:00 (CEST)
- Postal codes: 24634
- Dialling codes: 04324
- Vehicle registration: RD
- Website: www.arpsdorf.de

Arpsdorf is a municipality in the district of Rendsburg-Eckernförde, in Schleswig-Holstein, Germany.
