= Meezen =

- Municipality
- Coat of arms

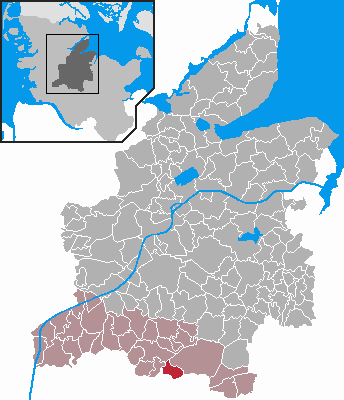
- Location of Meezen within Rendsburg-Eckernförde district
- Interactive map of Meezen
- Location within Germany Location within Schleswig-Holstein
- Coordinates: 54°3′N 9°42′E
- Country: Germany
- State: Schleswig-Holstein
- District: Rendsburg-Eckernförde
- Municipal assoc.: Mittelholstein

Government
  - Mayor: Gert Reese

Area
  - Total: 8.76 km^{2} (3.38 sq mi)
- Elevation: 53 m (174 ft)

Population (2025-12-31)
  - Total: 349
  - Density: 39.8/km^{2} (103/sq mi)
- Time zone: UTC+01:00 (CET)
  - Summer (DST): UTC+02:00 (CEST)
- Postal codes: 24594
- Dialling codes: 04877
- Vehicle registration: RD

Meezen (German pronunciation: [ˈmeːtsn̩]) is a municipality in the Rendsburg-Eckernförde district of Schleswig-Holstein, Germany.
