= Nindorf, Rendsburg-Eckernförde =

Nindorf
- Municipality
- Coat of arms

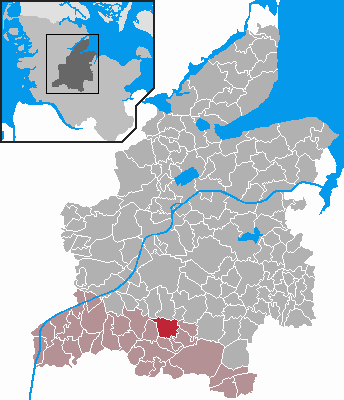
- Location of Nindorf within Rendsburg-Eckernförde district
- Interactive map of Nindorf
- Location within Germany Location within Schleswig-Holstein
- Coordinates: 54°8′N 9°42′E
- Country: Germany
- State: Schleswig-Holstein
- District: Rendsburg-Eckernförde
- Municipal assoc.: Mittelholstein

Government
  - Mayor: Edith Kühl

Area
  - Total: 14.04 km^{2} (5.42 sq mi)
- Elevation: 56 m (184 ft)

Population (2025-12-31)
  - Total: 625
  - Density: 44.5/km^{2} (115/sq mi)
- Time zone: UTC+01:00 (CET)
  - Summer (DST): UTC+02:00 (CEST)
- Postal codes: 24594
- Dialling codes: 04871
- Vehicle registration: RD

Nindorf is a municipality in the district of Rendsburg-Eckernförde, in Schleswig-Holstein, Germany.
