= Rade bei Hohenwestedt =

- Municipality
- Coat of arms

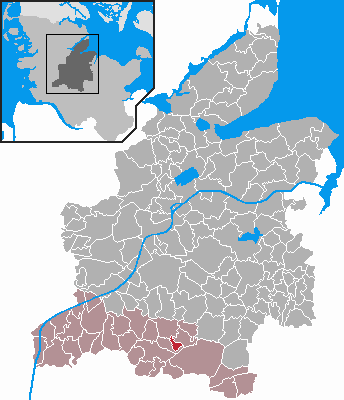
- Location of Rade bei Hohenwestedt within Rendsburg-Eckernförde district
- Interactive map of Rade bei Hohenwestedt
- Location within Germany Location within Schleswig-Holstein
- Coordinates: 54°6′14″N 9°43′7″E
- Country: Germany
- State: Schleswig-Holstein
- District: Rendsburg-Eckernförde
- Municipal assoc.: Mittelholstein

Government
  - Mayor: Jochen Rohwer

Area
  - Total: 3.2 km^{2} (1.2 sq mi)
- Elevation: 25 m (82 ft)

Population (2025-12-31)
  - Total: 99
  - Density: 31/km^{2} (80/sq mi)
- Time zone: UTC+01:00 (CET)
  - Summer (DST): UTC+02:00 (CEST)
- Postal codes: 24594
- Dialling codes: 04871
- Vehicle registration: RD

Rade bei Hohenwestedt is a municipality in the district of Rendsburg-Eckernförde, in Schleswig-Holstein, Germany.
