= Ehndorf =

- Municipality
- Coat of arms

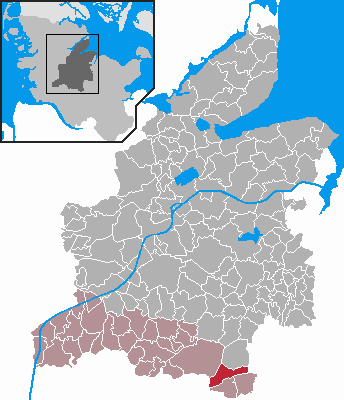
- Location of Ehndorf within Rendsburg-Eckernförde district
- Interactive map of Ehndorf
- Location within Germany Location within Schleswig-Holstein
- Coordinates: 54°3′12″N 9°53′42″E
- Country: Germany
- State: Schleswig-Holstein
- District: Rendsburg-Eckernförde
- Municipal assoc.: Mittelholstein

Government
  - Mayor: Magret Kaschner

Area
  - Total: 14.68 km^{2} (5.67 sq mi)
- Elevation: 13 m (43 ft)

Population (2025-12-31)
  - Total: 600
  - Density: 41/km^{2} (110/sq mi)
- Time zone: UTC+01:00 (CET)
  - Summer (DST): UTC+02:00 (CEST)
- Postal codes: 24647
- Dialling codes: 04321
- Vehicle registration: RD
- Website: www.amt-aukrug.de

Ehndorf is a municipality in the district of Rendsburg-Eckernförde, in Schleswig-Holstein, Germany.
