= Rendsburg-Eckernförde =

Coordinates: 54°15′N 9°45′E

- District
- Flag Coat of arms
- Country: Germany
- State: Schleswig-Holstein
- Capital: Rendsburg

Government
  - District admin.: Rolf-Oliver Schwemer

Area
  - Total: 2,185 km^{2} (844 sq mi)

Population (31 December 2022)
  - Total: 278,979
  - Density: 130/km^{2} (330/sq mi)
- Time zone: UTC+01:00 (CET)
  - Summer (DST): UTC+02:00 (CEST)
- Vehicle registration: RD
- Website: kreis-rendsburg-eckernfoerde.de

Rendsburg-Eckernförde (German pronunciation: [ˈʁɛnt͡sˌbʊʁk ɛkɐnˈføːɐ̯də]; Danish: Rendsborg-Egernførde) is a district in Schleswig-Holstein, Germany. It is bounded by (from the east and clockwise) the city of Kiel, the district of Plön, the city of Neumünster, the districts of Segeberg, Steinburg, Dithmarschen and Schleswig-Flensburg, and the Baltic Sea.

== History ==
In 1867 the Prussian administration established twenty districts in its province of Schleswig-Holstein, among them the districts of Rendsburg and Eckernförde. The present district was established in 1970 by merging the former districts.

== Geography ==
The district is situated at the coast of the Baltic Sea, roughly between the cities of Schleswig and Kiel. A large portion of the Kiel Canal passes through Rendsburg-Eckernförde. It is one of the largest districts in the whole of Germany.

== Coat of arms ==
The coat of arms displays:

- two lions (blue on yellow) from the arms of the Duchy of Schleswig
- a nettle leaf (white on red) from the arms of Holstein

== Towns and municipalities ==
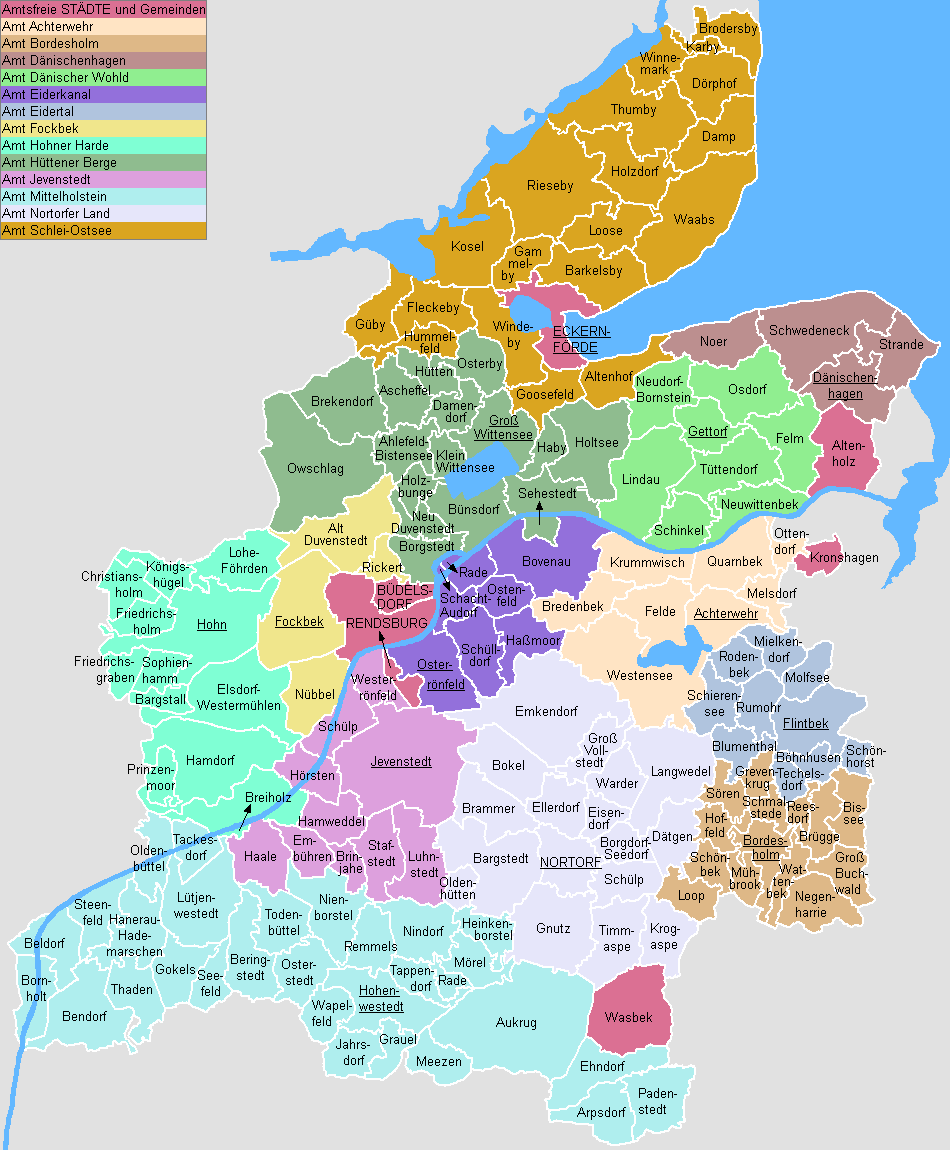

Independent towns
and municipalities
1. Büdelsdorf
2. Eckernförde
3. Rendsburg
4. Altenholz
5. Kronshagen
6. Wasbek

Ämter
1. Achterwehr; 1. Achterwehr^{1}; 2. Bredenbek; 3. Felde; 4. Krummwisch; 5. Melsdorf; 6. Ottendorf; 7. Quarnbek; 8. Westensee; 2. Bordesholm; 1. Bissee; 2. Bordesholm^{1}; 3. Brügge; 4. Grevenkrug; 5. Groß Buchwald; 6. Hoffeld; 7. Loop; 8. Mühbrook; 9. Negenharrie; 10. Reesdorf; 11. Schmalstede; 12. Schönbek; 13. Sören; 14. Wattenbek; 3. Dänischenhagen; 1. Dänischenhagen^{1}; 2. Noer; 3. Schwedeneck; 4. Strande; 4. Dänischer Wohld; 1. Felm; 2. Gettorf^{1}; 3. Lindau; 4. Neudorf-Bornstein; 5. Neuwittenbek; 6. Osdorf; 7. Schinkel; 8. Tüttendorf; 5. Eiderkanal; 1. Bovenau; 2. Haßmoor; 3. Ostenfeld; 4. Osterrönfeld^{1}; 5. Rade bei Rendsburg; 6. Schacht-Audorf; 7. Schülldorf	6. Eidertal; 1. Blumenthal; 2. Böhnhusen; 3. Flintbek^{1}; 4. Mielkendorf; 5. Molfsee; 6. Rodenbek; 7. Rumohr; 8. Schierensee; 9. Schönhorst; 10. Techelsdorf; 7. Fockbek; 1. Alt Duvenstedt; 2. Fockbek^{1}; 3. Nübbel; 4. Rickert; 8. Hohner Harde; 1. Bargstall; 2. Breiholz; 3. Christiansholm; 4. Elsdorf-Westermühlen; 5. Friedrichsgraben; 6. Friedrichsholm; 7. Hamdorf; 8. Hohn^{1}; 9. Königshügel; 10. Lohe-Föhrden; 11. Prinzenmoor; 12. Sophienhamm; 9. Hüttener Berge; 1. Ahlefeld-Bistensee; 2. Ascheffel; 3. Borgstedt; 4. Brekendorf; 5. Bünsdorf; 6. Damendorf; 7. Groß Wittensee^{1}; 8. Haby; 9. Holtsee; 10. Holzbunge; 11. Hütten; 12. Klein Wittensee; 13. Neu Duvenstedt; 14. Osterby; 15. Owschlag; 16. Sehestedt	10. Jevenstedt; 1. Brinjahe; 2. Embühren; 3. Haale; 4. Hamweddel; 5. Hörsten; 6. Jevenstedt^{1}; 7. Luhnstedt; 8. Schülp bei Rendsburg; 9. Stafstedt; 10. Westerrönfeld; 11. Mittelholstein; 1. Arpsdorf; 2. Aukrug; 3. Beldorf; 4. Bendorf; 5. Beringstedt; 6. Bornholt; 7. Ehndorf; 8. Gokels; 9. Grauel; 10. Hanerau-Hademarschen; 11. Heinkenborstel; 12. Hohenwestedt^{1}; 13. Jahrsdorf; 14. Lütjenwestedt; 15. Oldenbüttel; 16. Meezen; 17. Mörel; 18. Nienborstel; 19. Nindorf; 20. Osterstedt; 21. Padenstedt; 22. Rade bei Hohenwestedt; 23. Remmels; 24. Seefeld; 25. Steenfeld; 26. Tackesdorf; 27. Tappendorf; 28. Thaden; 29. Todenbüttel; 30. Wapelfeld	12. Nortorfer Land; 1. Bargstedt; 2. Bokel; 3. Borgdorf-Seedorf; 4. Brammer; 5. Dätgen; 6. Eisendorf; 7. Ellerdorf; 8. Emkendorf; 9. Gnutz; 10. Groß Vollstedt; 11. Krogaspe; 12. Langwedel; 13. Nortorf^{1, 2}; 14. Oldenhütten; 15. Schülp bei Nortorf; 16. Timmaspe; 17. Warder; 13. Schlei-Ostsee [seat: Eckernförde]; 1. Altenhof; 2. Barkelsby; 3. Brodersby; 4. Damp; 5. Dörphof; 6. Fleckeby; 7. Gammelby; 8. Goosefeld; 9. Güby; 10. Holzdorf; 11. Hummelfeld; 12. Karby; 13. Kosel; 14. Loose; 15. Rieseby; 16. Thumby; 17. Waabs; 18. Windeby; 19. Winnemark
^{1}seat of the Amt;^{2}town
