= Mörel, Germany =

Mörel
- Municipality
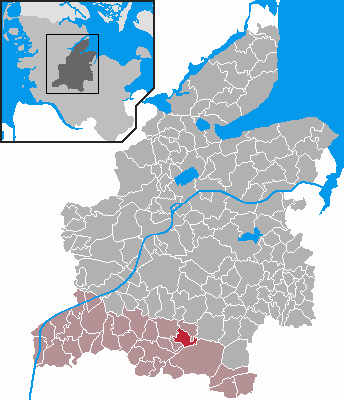
- Location of Mörel within Rendsburg-Eckernförde district
- Interactive map of Mörel
- Location within Germany Location within Schleswig-Holstein
- Coordinates: 54°7′N 9°44′E
- Country: Germany
- State: Schleswig-Holstein
- District: Rendsburg-Eckernförde
- Municipal assoc.: Mittelholstein

Government
  - Mayor: Klaus-Peter Lucht

Area
  - Total: 8.69 km^{2} (3.36 sq mi)
- Elevation: 58 m (190 ft)

Population (2025-12-31)
  - Total: 268
  - Density: 30.8/km^{2} (79.9/sq mi)
- Time zone: UTC+01:00 (CET)
  - Summer (DST): UTC+02:00 (CEST)
- Postal codes: 24594
- Dialling codes: 04871, 04873
- Vehicle registration: RD

Mörel (German pronunciation: [ˈmøːʁəl]) is a municipality in the district of Rendsburg-Eckernförde, in Schleswig-Holstein, Germany.
