= Hohenwestedt =

- Municipality
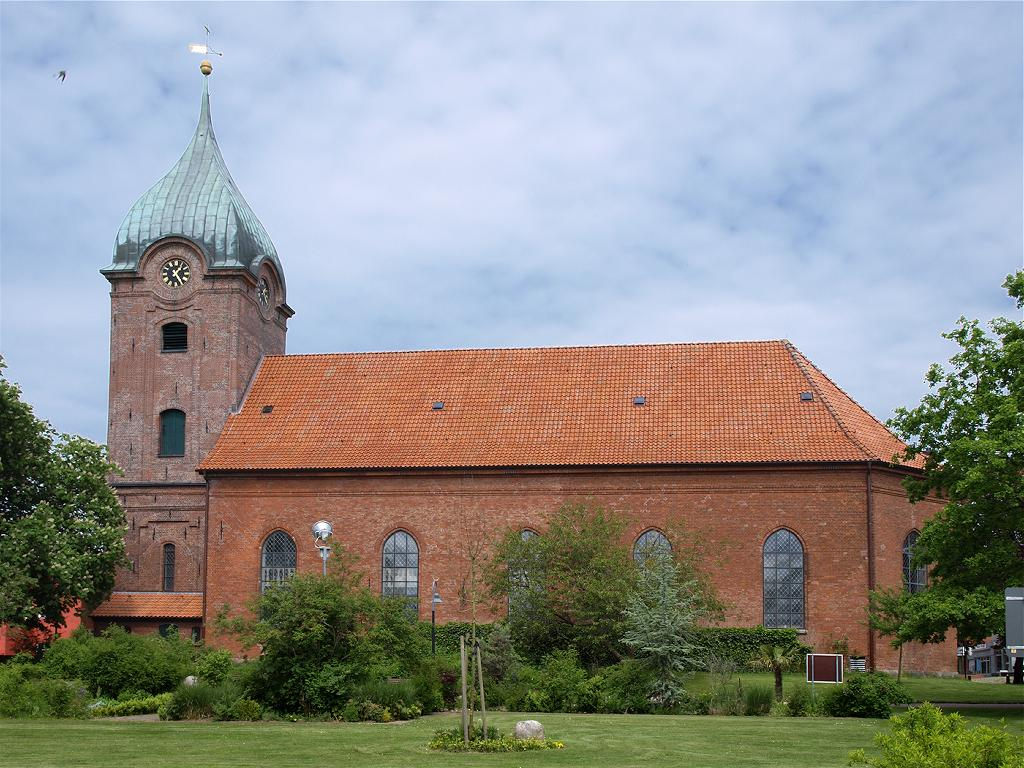
- Church of Saints Peter and Paul

- Coat of arms

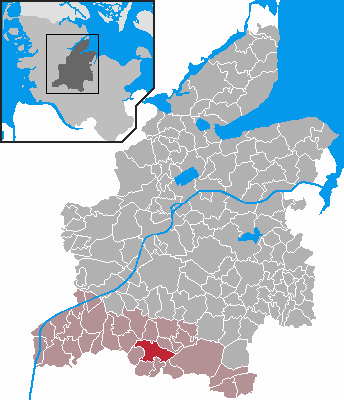
- Location of Hohenwestedt within Rendsburg-Eckernförde district
- Interactive map of Hohenwestedt
- Location within Germany Location within Schleswig-Holstein
- Coordinates: 54°5′N 9°40′E
- Country: Germany
- State: Schleswig-Holstein
- District: Rendsburg-Eckernförde
- Municipal assoc.: Mittelholstein

Government
  - Mayor: Jan Butenschön

Area
  - Total: 18.18 km^{2} (7.02 sq mi)
- Elevation: 38 m (125 ft)

Population (2025-12-31)
  - Total: 5,397
  - Density: 296.9/km^{2} (768.9/sq mi)
- Time zone: UTC+01:00 (CET)
  - Summer (DST): UTC+02:00 (CEST)
- Postal codes: 24594
- Dialling codes: 04871
- Vehicle registration: RD
- Website: www.hohenwestedt.de

Hohenwestedt (Low Saxon: Wiste') is a municipality in the district of Rendsburg-Eckernförde, in Schleswig-Holstein, Germany. It is situated approximately 23 km south of Rendsburg, 25 km west of Neumünster and 40 km southwest of Kiel.

It has a population of about 5,000 and a size of 18.18 squarekilometer. Since January 2012 it is part of the Amt Mittelholstein, of which it is the seat.

The town's landmark is the Peter-Pauls Church, the biggest church in town.

Hohenwestedt's twin towns are Müncheberg, Germany, and Billund, Denmark.

== Transportation ==
The town lies on the Neumünster-Heide railway and offers connections to Neumünster and Heide.
