= Osterrönfeld (Amt) =

Coordinates: 54.316667°N 9.783333°E

- Former amt
- Flag Coat of arms

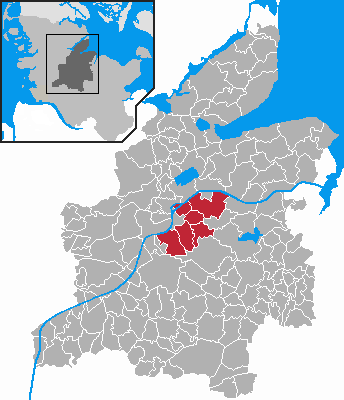
- Map of Rendsburg-Eckernförde highlighting Osterrönfeld
- Country: Germany
- State: Schleswig-Holstein
- District: Rendsburg-Eckernförde
- Disestablished: 1 January 2008
- Region seat: Osterrönfeld

Area
  - Total: 80 km^{2} (31 sq mi)
- Website: www.amt-osterroenfeld.de

Osterrönfeld was an Amt ("collective municipality") in the Rendsburg-Eckernförde, in Schleswig-Holstein, Germany. Its seat was in Osterrönfeld. In January 2008, it was merged with the independent municipality of Schacht-Audorf to form the Amt Eiderkanal.

The Amt Nusse consisted of the following municipalities (population in 2005 between brackets):

1. Bovenau
2. Haßmoor
3. Ostenfeld
4. Osterrönfeld
5. Rade bei Rendsburg
6. Schülldorf
