= Emkendorf =

- Municipality
- Coat of arms

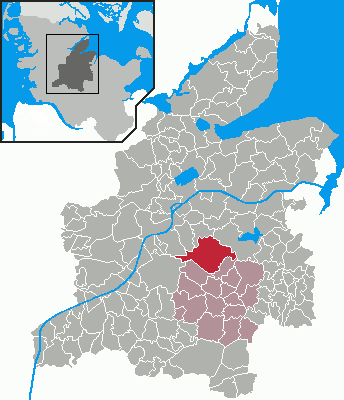
- Location of Emkendorf within Rendsburg-Eckernförde district
- Interactive map of Emkendorf
- Location within Germany Location within Schleswig-Holstein
- Coordinates: 54°15′39″N 9°51′2″E
- Country: Germany
- State: Schleswig-Holstein
- District: Rendsburg-Eckernförde
- Municipal assoc.: Nortorfer Land

Government
  - Mayor: Rainer Follster

Area
  - Total: 38.93 km^{2} (15.03 sq mi)
- Elevation: 19 m (62 ft)

Population (2025-12-31)
  - Total: 1,310
  - Density: 33.7/km^{2} (87.2/sq mi)
- Time zone: UTC+01:00 (CET)
  - Summer (DST): UTC+02:00 (CEST)
- Postal codes: 24802
- Dialling codes: 04330
- Vehicle registration: RD
- Website: www.amt-nortorfer- land.de

Emkendorf is a municipality in the district of Rendsburg-Eckernförde, in Schleswig-Holstein, Germany.

The location of Emkendorf is south of the municipality of Osterrönfeld, Schülldorf, Haßmoor or Westensee, but north of Bokel and Groß Vollstedt.
