= Bundesstraße 205 =

Federal highway in Germany

B 205
- Bundesstraße 205

Route information
- Length: 25 km (16 mi)

Major junctions
- West end: Padenstedt
- East end: Negernbötel

Location
- Country: Germany
- States: Schleswig-Holstein

Highway system
- Roads in Germany; Autobahns; List; Federal; List; State; E-roads

The Bundesstraße 205 is a German federal road or Bundesstraße and the west–east link between Neumünster and Bad Segeberg in the central part of the state of Schleswig-Holstein.

== Route ==
The B 205 begins southwest of the city of Neumünster with an interchange at the A 7 motorway. It then continues as the southern bypass of the city. Afterwards it runs east until it reaches the A 21 motorway north of Bad Segeberg. Due to its location the road also connects the cities of Flensburg/Rendsburg with Lübeck.

== History ==
The original road used to run between Jevenstedt near Rendsburg, Neumünster and Bad Segeberg. Due to the construction of the southern bypass of Neumünster and the route being parallel to the A 7 motorway the section between Jevenstedt and Rickling was downgraded to the L328 (Jevenstedt-Neumünster Sauerbruchstraße), K12 (NMS Sauerbruchstr.-NMS Am Teich), K13 (NME Am Teich-NMS Sachsenring), L322 (NMS Sachsenring-north of NMS-Galeland junction (current B 205)), K19 (north of NMS-Galeland junction-NMS city limit) and K114 (NMS city limit-Willingrade near Rickling).

== Major junctions ==
State	District	Location	km	mi	Exit	Name	Destinations	Notes
Former Route between Jevenstedt and Neumünster
Schleswig-Holstein	Rendsburg-Eckernförde	Jevenstedt				Jevenstedt	B 77 – Flensburg, Rendsburg, Itzehoe, Hohenwestedt	former route of the B 205
Schleswig-Holstein	Rendsburg-Eckernförde	Brammer				Brammer	Brammer, Bokel	former route of the B 205
Schleswig-Holstein	Rendsburg-Eckernförde	Nortorf				Nortorf-Bargstedter Straße	Nortorf, Bargstedt	former route of the B 205
Schleswig-Holstein	Rendsburg-Eckernförde	Nortorf				Nortorf-Itzehoer Straße	Nortorf, Aukrug, Itzehoe	former route of the B 205 Itzehoe is only signed eastbound
Schleswig-Holstein	Rendsburg-Eckernförde	Timmaspe				Timmaspe	Krogaspe, Timmaspe	former route of the B 205
Schleswig-Holstein	Neumünster	Einfeld			13	Neumünster-Nord	A 7 / E45 – Flensburg, Kiel, Hamburg	former route of the B 205
Schleswig-Holstein	Neumünster	Gartenstadt				Neumünster-Stoverweg	Neumünster-Einfeld	former route of the B 205
Schleswig-Holstein	Neumünster	Gartenstadt				Neumünster-Saarbruchstraße	B 430 – Lübeck, Plön, Hohenwestedt	former route of the B 205 cross-level intersection The B 430 didn't run here before the downgrade of the B 205
Schleswig-Holstein	Neumünster	Innenstadt				Neumünster-Kieler Straße	B 4 – Kiel	former route of the B 205 cross-level intersection
Schleswig-Holstein	Neumünster	Innenstadt				Neumünster-Kieler Straße	B 430 – Hohenwestedt	former route of the B 205 cross-level intersection
Schleswig-Holstein	Neumünster	Innenstadt				Neumünster-Altonaer Straße	B 4 – Hamburg; B 430 – Plön	former route of the B 205 cross-level intersection
Schleswig-Holstein	Current B 205 joins at Willingrade near Rickling; Current B 205							
Schleswig-Holstein	Rendsburg-Eckernförde	Padenstedt			15	Neumünster-Süd	A 7 / E45 – Flensburg, Kiel, Hamburg	
Schleswig-Holstein	Neumünster	Wittorf				Neumünster-Wittorf West	Neumünster-Altonaer Straße	
Schleswig-Holstein	Neumünster	Wittorf				Neumünster-Wittorf Ost	Neumünster Süd	
Schleswig-Holstein	Neumünster	Gadeland				Boostedt	Neumünster-Boostedter Straße, Boostedt	
Schleswig-Holstein	Neumünster	Gadeland				Neumünster-Gadeland	Neumünster-Gadeland	
Schleswig-Holstein	Segeberg	Rickling				Rickling	Rickling, Trappenkamp	
Schleswig-Holstein	Segeberg	Rickling				Rickling-Fehrenbötel	Wahlstedt, Rickling, Fehrenbötel	Rickling is only signed westbound Wahlstedt is only signed eastbound
Schleswig-Holstein	Segeberg	Negernbötel				Wahlstedt	Negernbötel, Wahlstedt, Kiel ( A 21)	
Schleswig-Holstein	Segeberg	Negernbötel			11	Wahlstedt	A 21 – Berlin, Hamburg, Bad Segeberg ( A 20)	incomplete junction: no entrance ramp Neumünster → Kiel missing relation can be accessed by a slip road north of the junction
Schleswig-Holstein	Segeberg	Negernbötel				Wahlstedt	B 404 – Kiel	former B 404 road was upgraded to A 21 motorway
Schleswig-Holstein	Segeberg	Bad Segeberg				Bad Segeberg	B 206 – Lübeck, Itzehoe	former route of the B 205 route was downgraded due to the construction of parallel B 404 (now A 21)
1.000 mi = 1.609 km; 1.000 km = 0.621 mi: Closed/former; Incomplete access

== See also ==
- List of federal roads in Germany
