= Osterrönfeld =

- Municipality
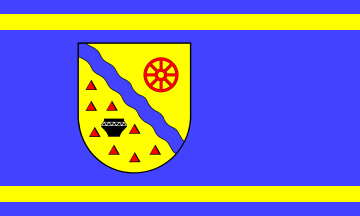
- Flag Coat of arms

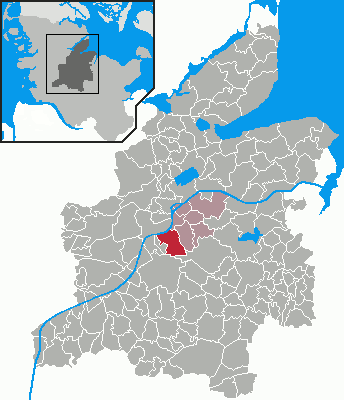
- Location of Osterrönfeld within Rendsburg-Eckernförde district
- Interactive map of Osterrönfeld
- Location within Germany Location within Schleswig-Holstein
- Coordinates: 54°17′N 9°42′E
- Country: Germany
- State: Schleswig-Holstein
- District: Rendsburg-Eckernförde
- Municipal assoc.: Eiderkanal

Government
  - Mayor: Bernd Sienknecht

Area
  - Total: 17.89 km^{2} (6.91 sq mi)
- Elevation: 5 m (16 ft)

Population (2025-12-31)
  - Total: 4,957
  - Density: 277.1/km^{2} (717.6/sq mi)
- Time zone: UTC+01:00 (CET)
  - Summer (DST): UTC+02:00 (CEST)
- Postal codes: 24783
- Dialling codes: 04331
- Vehicle registration: RD
- Website: www.amt-eiderkanal.de

Osterrönfeld is a municipality in the district of Rendsburg-Eckernförde, in Schleswig-Holstein, Germany. It is situated on the Kiel Canal, approx. 2 km southeast of Rendsburg.

Osterrönfeld is also the seat of the Amt ("collective municipality") Eiderkanal, which consists of the following municipalities:

1. Bovenau
2. Haßmoor
3. Ostenfeld
4. Osterrönfeld
5. Rade b. Rendsburg
6. Schacht-Audorf
7. Schülldorf
