= Ostenfeld =

Ostenfeld may refer to:

- Ostenfeld, Nordfriesland, a municipality in Schleswig-Holstein, Germany
- Ostenfeld, Rendsburg-Eckernförde, a municipality in Schleswig-Holstein, Germany
- Asger Skovgaard Ostenfeld, a Danish civil engineer
- Carl Hansen Ostenfeld, a Danish botanist
