= Eiderkanal (Amt) =

- Amt
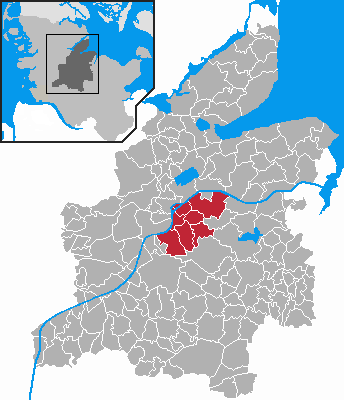
- Map of Rendsburg-Eckernförde highlighting Eiderkanal
- Interactive map of Eiderkanal
- Location within Germany Location within Schleswig-Holstein
- Coordinates: 54°19′N 9°47′E
- Country: Germany
- State: Schleswig-Holstein
- District: Rendsburg-Eckernförde
- Seat: Osterrönfeld
- Subdivisions: 7 municipalities

Government
  - Mayor: Hans-Georg Volquardts

Area
  - Total: 87.74 km^{2} (33.88 sq mi)

Population (2025-12-31)
  - Total: 12,716
  - Density: 144.9/km^{2} (375.4/sq mi)
- Time zone: UTC+01:00 (CET)
  - Summer (DST): UTC+02:00 (CEST)
- Website: www.amt-eiderkanal.de

Eiderkanal is an Amt ("collective municipality") in the district of Rendsburg-Eckernförde, in Schleswig-Holstein, Germany. It is situated on the Kiel Canal, approx. 2 km southeast of Rendsburg. The seat of the Amt is in Osterrönfeld. It is named after the old Eider Canal, whose western terminus was at Rendsburg.

== Subdivision ==
The Amt consists of the following municipalities:

1. Bovenau
2. Haßmoor
3. Ostenfeld
4. Osterrönfeld
5. Rade bei Rendsburg
6. Schacht-Audorf
7. Schülldorf

== See also ==
- Amt Osterrönfeld
