= Levensau =

Levensau may refer to:

- Levensau (river), a small river in Schleswig-Holstein, Germany
- Levensau High Bridge, a bridge spanning the Kiel Canal
- SS Frontier (1922), a cargo ship briefly named Levensau in 1945
