= Holtenau =

Coordinates: 54°22′25″N 10°08′30″E

Holtenau Holtenå
- Urban district
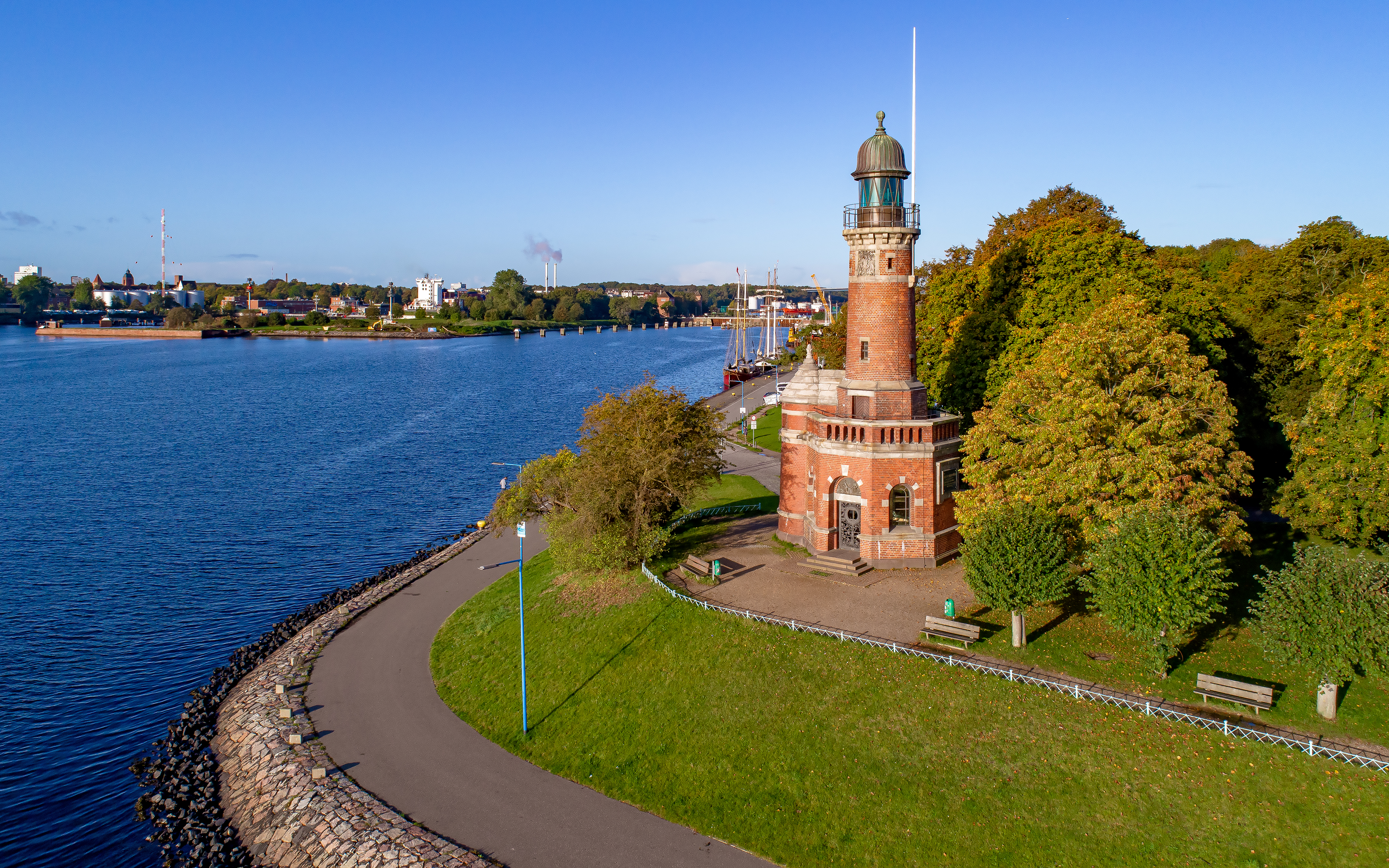
- Holtenau Lighthouse
- Interactive map of Holtenau
- Country: Germany
- State: Schleswig-Holstein
- City: Kiel
- Incorporated: 1922

Area
  - Total: 5.91 km^{2} (2.28 sq mi)

Population (2014)
  - Total: 5,204
  - Density: 880/km^{2} (2,300/sq mi)
- Postal Code of Germany: 24159
- Area code: 0431

Holtenau (German pronunciation: [ˈhɔltənaʊ̯]; Danish: Holtenå) is a district of Kiel, on the southeastern part of the Danish Wahld. It was historically part of the Duchy of Schleswig, and has cultural influences from both Germany and Denmark.

The district is located at the mouth of the Kiel Canal on the Kieler Förde. Its location has made Holtenau a significant part of the region's shipping industry. Until 2012, a naval airbase was also operational in Holtenau.

== History ==
Some ancient documents have referred to the region as Olthena or Altena. The district's current name may have derived from the Levensau river which flows into the Kiel Canal in Holtenau, though the exact etymology of the name is unclear.

The village of Holtenau belonged to the Knoop estate and then later to the Seekamp estate. The Seekamp estate was founded ca. 1570, though the area called "Sehekampf" was first mentioned in documents dating from 1350. In 1679, Christian V gave the Seekamp estate, which Holtenau was a part of, to "Oberjägermeister von Hahn." The deed which gave van Hahn the estate also explicitly granted him lordship over those who resided in Holtenau. During this period, the majority of Holtenau's population were serfs within the estate. In 1741, Holtenau had a population of 131, 108 of whom were serfs.

In 1791, the lord of the estate abolished serfdom, and the land was parceled out to private individuals following the approval of the Danish crown. The village of Holtenau then became part of the Eckernförde district. When Schleswig-Holstein was annexed by Prussia, the Seekamp estate was dissolved entirely and divided into individual rural communities, including Holtenau.

In 1922, the district was incorporated into Kiel. There were over 3,000 inhabitants at the time.

== Infrastructure ==
=== Kiel canal ===
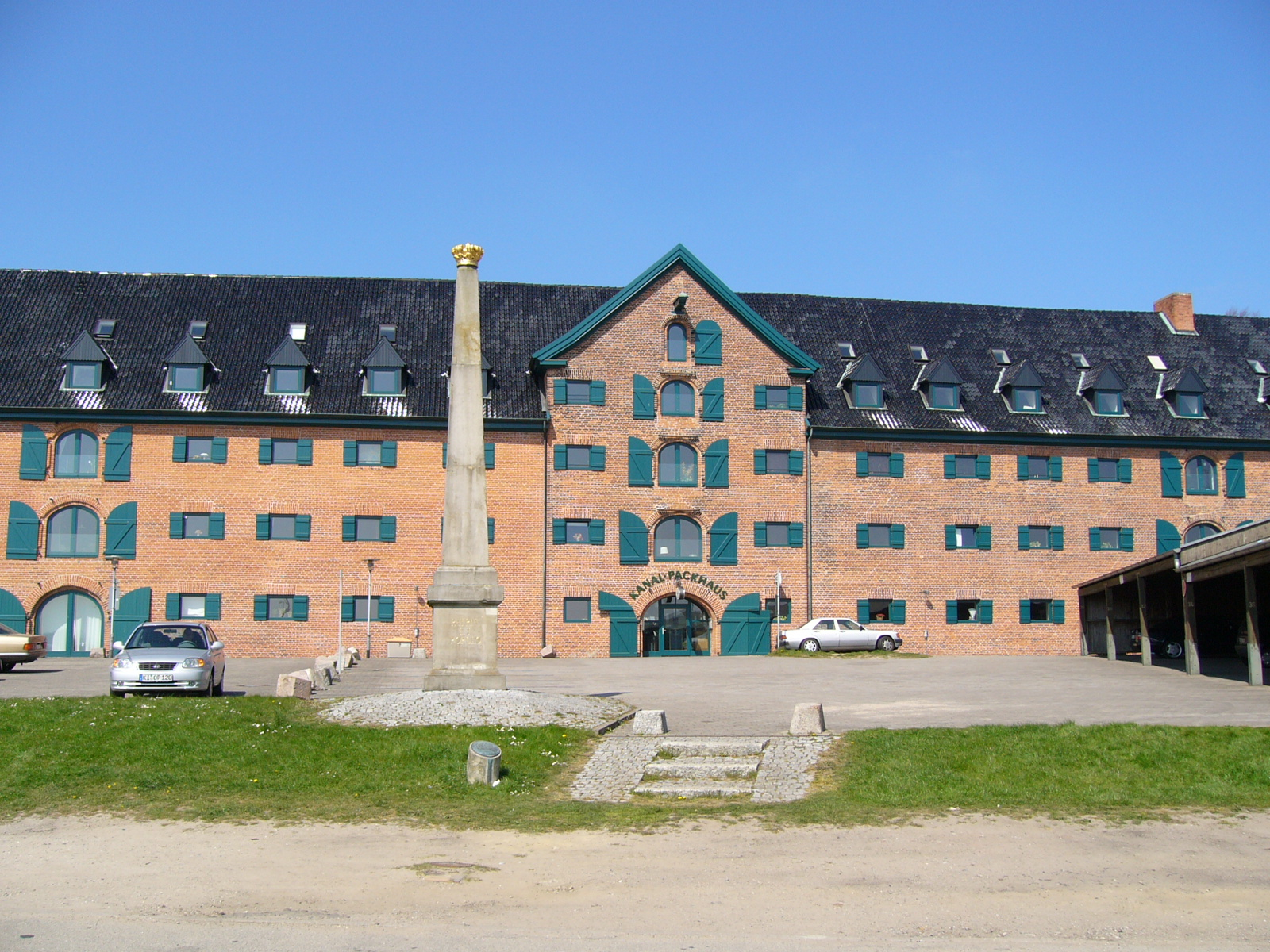
Eider Canal warehouse in Holtenau. The obelisk in front of the building bears the inscription Patriae et Populo.

The construction the Eider Canal began in 1777 near Holtenau and followed the Levensau river. The canal's Holtenau lock, which is no longer in use remains preserved as a heritage site. Near the lock, one the canal's three warehouses was constructed. Today it houses apartments and a restaurant.

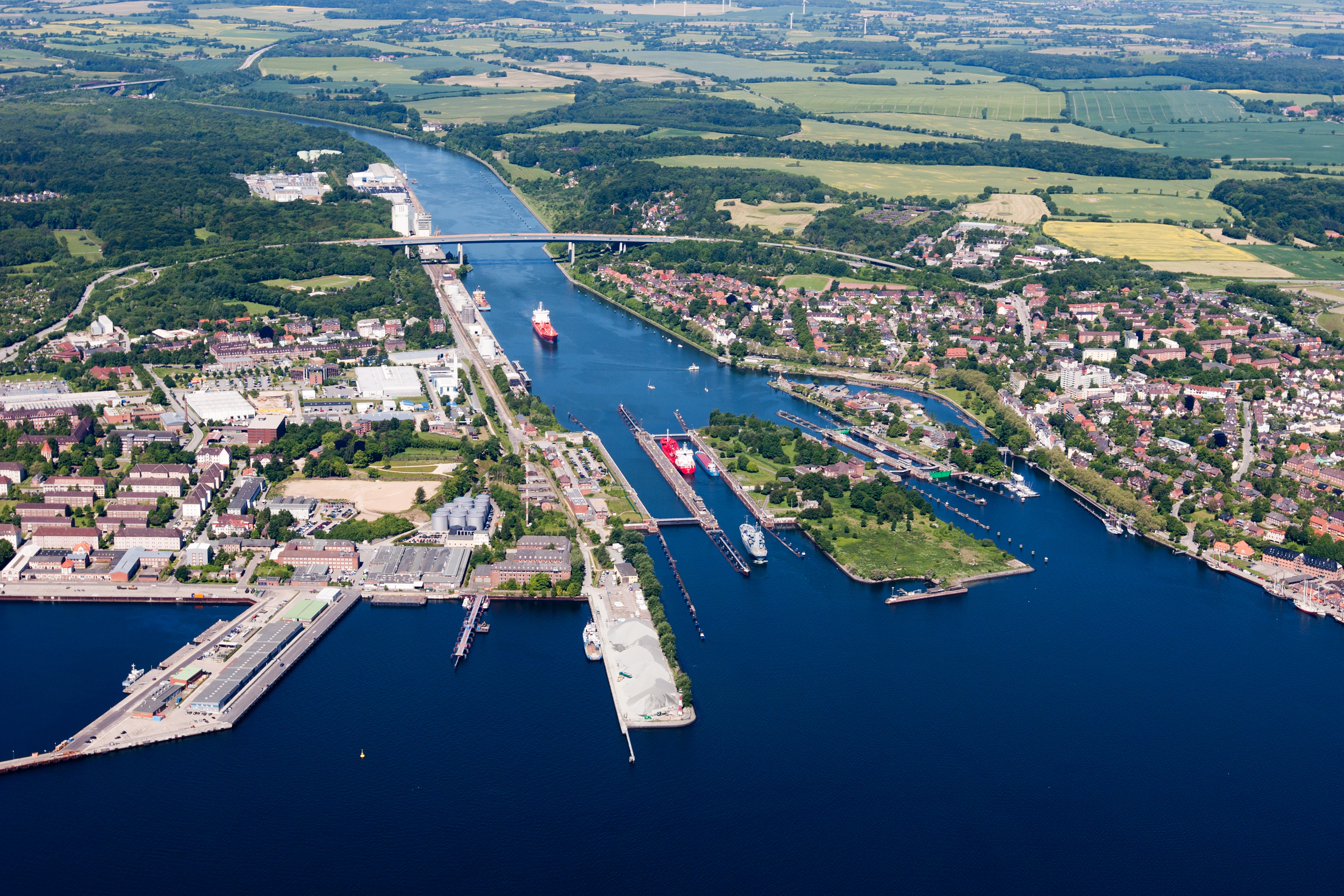
The locks Between Wik and Holtenau at the mouth of the Kiel Canal

The Imperial Canal Commission (German: Kaiserliche Kanalkommission) was created on July 17, 1886, and charged with the creation of a canal connecting the north sea to the baltic sea which would replace the Eider Canal. Wilhelm I ceremonially laid the first stone of the Holtenau lock on June 3, 1887. After eight years of construction, William II laid the final stone on June 20, 1895. The canal was originally named in memory of William I, as "Kaiser-Wilhelm-Kanal". William II later took the inaugural trip on the canal in 1914 onboard the SMY Hohenzollern accompanied by several other vessels.

In 1895 the Holtenau lighthouse (German: Leuchtturm Holtenau) was erected at the entrance of the canal. Though the lighthouse serves a navigational purpose, it was also intended as a monument to glorify the German Empire.

The "canal steerers" (German: kanalsteurer), who direct traffic though the canal, remain based in Holtenau to this day.

=== Kiel airport ===
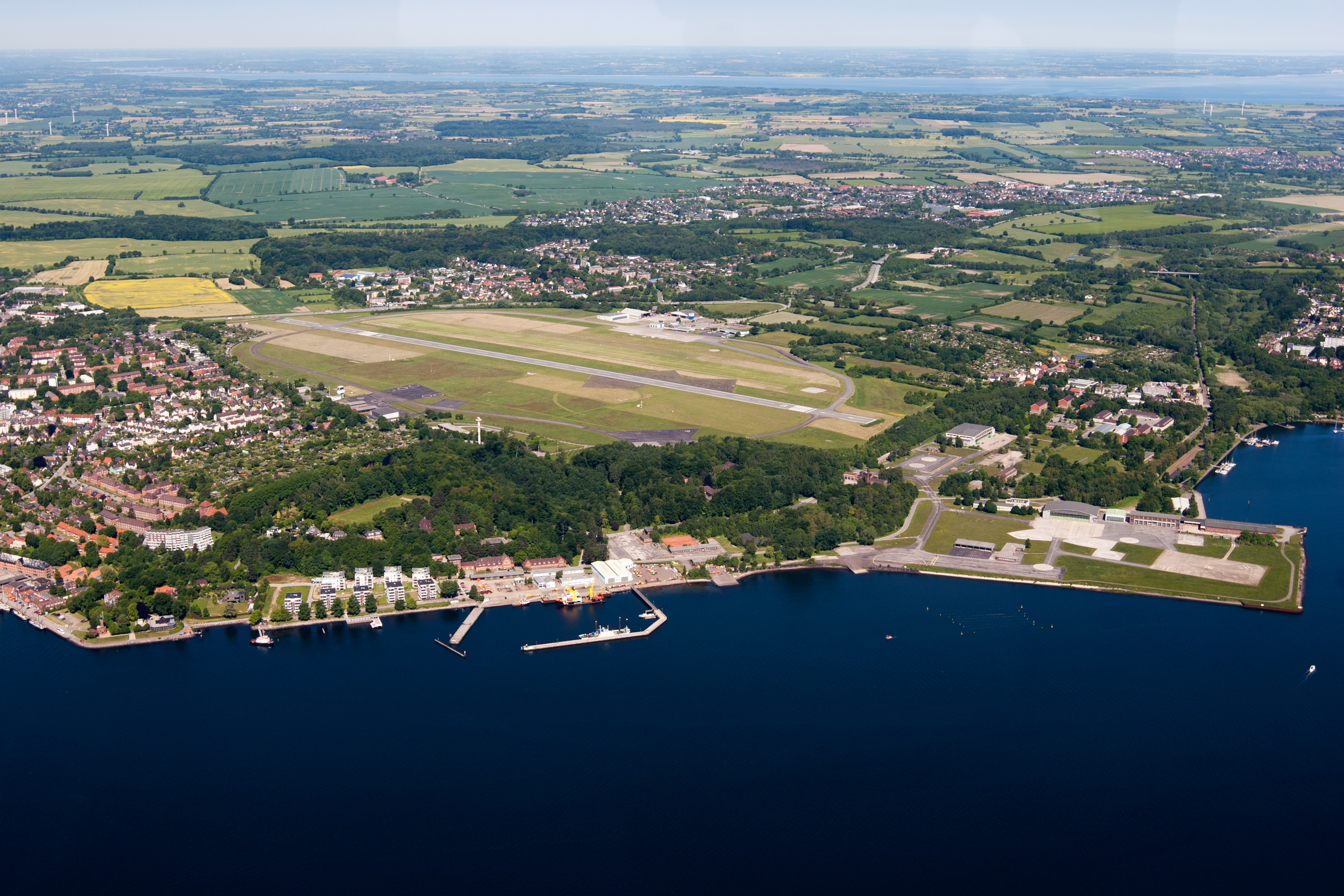
Aerial view of Holtenau and the former airport

In the 1880s, forts were constructed along the Kiel Förde. Fort Holtenau was completed in 1888 and housed approximately 250 men. The fort, along with all of the other Kiel forts, was demolished after the First World War. The area previously housing the fort was cleared and leveled in 1925 to allow for an expansion of the Kiel Airport.

The airport opened in 1927 as a private organization. In 1934 the city sold the land to the state, expanded, and converted to a military airbase. To allow for the expansion of the airbase and the construction of military facilities, many locals were forced to sell their properties. At the onset of the Second World War a quarter of all people living in Holtenau worked at the airbase as members of the Luftwaffe.

The airport fell into decline after the war. In 1958, after the establishment of the German Navy, the Marineflieger reconstructed the base and created the naval pilot division of Marinefliegergeschwader 5 (MFG 5) at the new site. MFG 5 has since moved their division to Nordholz Naval Airbase.

In 2007, the European Commission approved the extension of the runway at the Kiel-Holtenau Airport. The project was originally granted €20,200,000 through Schleswig-Holstein and the German federal government.

All military operations at the airbase ceased in 2012. At its closure the base covered 92 hectares of land. Since 2014, the former naval air base has been decommissioned and the land open for use by the general public. A series of plans have since been approved to develop the area for commercial and private use.

== Culture ==
=== Religion ===
Prior to the construction of a church in Holtenau, the majority of residents were parishioners of the church in Dänischenhagen, which had been built around 1250. Most were buried in the cemetery there until the construction of a church and cemetery in Holtenau itself in 1897. The church was founded as an independent evangelical lutheran church and named Dankeskirche ('Thanksgiving Church') as an expression of gratitude for the recent construction of the Kiel Canal. The tower was originally 52 metres tall but was shortened to 26 metres when the airbase was built.

The cemetery in Holtenau was consecrated on 28 November 1899 by Pastor Wilhelm Julius Hellwag. It has since been expanded and now occupies an area of 3.7 hectares. There is a series of memorials to those who fought and died in the first and second world wars.

Today the Danish Church in Southern Schleswig has a congregation in the community. Holtenau is also part of the Roman Catholic parish of Kiel-Nord, which was founded at the time the district was incorporated into Kiel in 1922. The parish's St Elisabeth Church was built in 1958. Owing to a decline in attendance the church was deconsecrated by the diocese of Hamburg in 2003. Its facilities were converted into an architect's office in 2006.

=== Education ===
The district has had a primary school since at least 1741, though the current school was built in 1961. The closest secondary school, Altenholz Gymnasium, is located in the neighboring town of Altenholz.

Beginning around 1650, children from Holtenau could attend school in Dänischenhagen, though few were able because of the distance and fees charged. The first school in the area was established around 1706 at the "Gut Seekamp" in Pries, the district of Kiel north of Holtenau. The school was overseen by the pastor of the parish in Dänischenhagen, and emphasised biblical learning.

In 1741, the first school in Holtenau itself was founded when half of a cottage was designated as a classroom. This school was poorly funded until after the abolishment of serfdom, when the building which had been owned by the overseeing estate, passed into the possession of the residents of Holtenau. In the beginning of the 19th century, a new building was built specifically to house the school and its teacher. Several more expansions and new constructions were made thereafter to accommodate more students and a growing population.

During WWII, the school was closed and many children were evacuated. Until 1945, some classes were held at the Wendeburg bunker. The bunker had been built in 1939 and was destroyed in a bombing in 1945. During the war, there were army barracks in the schoolyard and the school itself was used to store grain and other military supplies. After the end of the war, several classrooms at the school were used to house refugees from nearby areas which had been decimated.

During the British occupation of the region, an English school was set up in 1947 for the children of British families, though it closed shortly thereafter. In 1961, the primary school building that exists today was built.
