= Schülp =

Schülp may refer to the following places in Schleswig-Holstein, Germany:

- Schülp, Dithmarschen, in the district of Dithmarschen
- Schülp bei Rendsburg, in the district of Rendsburg-Eckernförde
- Schülp bei Nortorf, in the district of Rendsburg-Eckernförde
