= Seydewitz =

Surname

Seydewitz is a surname. Notable people with the surname include:

- Carl Christian Seydewitz (1777–1857), German-Danish portrait painter and officer
- Ernst von Seydewitz (1852–1929), Saxon politician and saxon finance minister
- Max Seydewitz (1892–1987), German politician (SPD, SAPD and SED)
- Otto von Seydewitz (1818–1898), Prussian politician, member of Reichstag
