= Timmaspe =

- Municipality
- Coat of arms

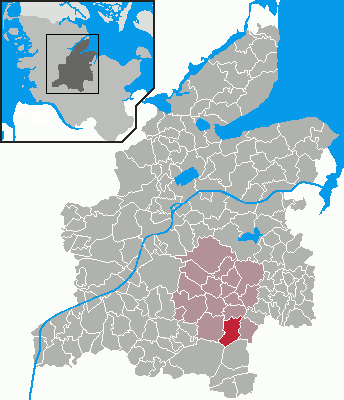
- Location of Timmaspe within Rendsburg-Eckernförde district
- Interactive map of Timmaspe
- Location within Germany Location within Schleswig-Holstein
- Coordinates: 54°7′N 9°52′E
- Country: Germany
- State: Schleswig-Holstein
- District: Rendsburg-Eckernförde
- Municipal assoc.: Nortorfer Land

Government
  - Mayor: Fritz Mester

Area
  - Total: 15.36 km^{2} (5.93 sq mi)
- Elevation: 24 m (79 ft)

Population (2025-12-31)
  - Total: 1,126
  - Density: 73.31/km^{2} (189.9/sq mi)
- Time zone: UTC+01:00 (CET)
  - Summer (DST): UTC+02:00 (CEST)
- Postal codes: 24644
- Dialling codes: 04392
- Vehicle registration: RD
- Website: www.amt-nortorfer- land.de

Timmaspe is a municipality in the district of Rendsburg-Eckernförde, in Schleswig-Holstein, Germany.

The location of Timmaspe is south of the municipality of Schülp bei Nortorf, but north of Wasbek, and east of Gnutz.
