= Eisendorf =

- Municipality
- Coat of arms

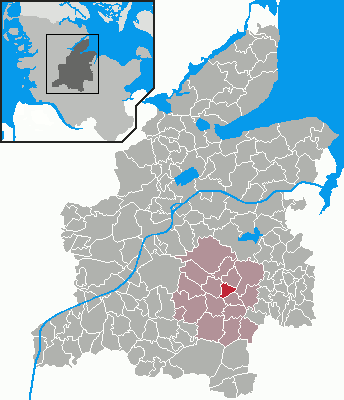
- Location of Eisendorf within Rendsburg-Eckernförde district
- Interactive map of Eisendorf
- Location within Germany Location within Schleswig-Holstein
- Coordinates: 54°12′N 9°52′E
- Country: Germany
- State: Schleswig-Holstein
- District: Rendsburg-Eckernförde
- Municipal assoc.: Nortorfer Land

Government
  - Mayor: Bernd Irps

Area
  - Total: 5.5 km^{2} (2.1 sq mi)
- Elevation: 27 m (89 ft)

Population (2025-12-31)
  - Total: 278
  - Density: 51/km^{2} (130/sq mi)
- Time zone: UTC+01:00 (CET)
  - Summer (DST): UTC+02:00 (CEST)
- Postal codes: 24589
- Dialling codes: 04392
- Vehicle registration: RD
- Website: www.amt-nortorfer- land.de

Eisendorf (German pronunciation: [ˈaɪzn̩dɔʁf]) is a municipality in the district of Rendsburg-Eckernförde, in Schleswig-Holstein, Germany.

== See also ==
- Isaiah Eisendorf (born 1996), American-Israeli basketball player in the Israeli Basketball Premier League
