= Nortorfer Land =

- Amt
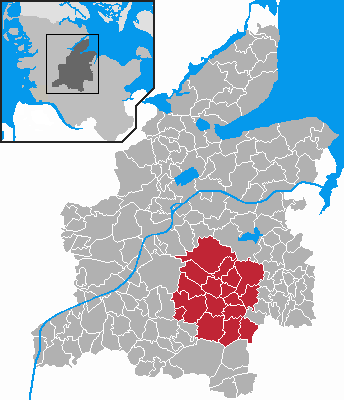
- Map of Rendsburg-Eckernförde highlighting Nortorfer Land
- Interactive map of Nortorfer Land
- Location within Germany Location within Schleswig-Holstein
- Coordinates: 54°10′N 9°52′E
- Country: Germany
- State: Schleswig-Holstein
- District: Rendsburg-Eckernförde
- Seat: Nortorf
- Subdivisions: 17 municipalities

Government
  - Mayor: Dieter Staschewski

Area
  - Total: 245.2 km^{2} (94.7 sq mi)

Population (2025-12-31)
  - Total: 18,974
  - Density: 77.38/km^{2} (200.4/sq mi)
- Time zone: UTC+01:00 (CET)
  - Summer (DST): UTC+02:00 (CEST)
- Website: www.amt-achterwehr.de

Nortorfer Land (until 1 January 2007: Nortorf-Land) is an Amt ("collective municipality") in the district of Rendsburg-Eckernförde, in Schleswig-Holstein, Germany. It is situated around the town Nortorf, which is the seat of the Amt.

The Amt Nortorfer Land consists of the following municipalities:

1. Bargstedt
2. Bokel
3. Borgdorf-Seedorf
4. Brammer
5. Dätgen
6. Eisendorf
7. Ellerdorf
8. Emkendorf
9. Gnutz
10. Groß Vollstedt
11. Krogaspe
12. Langwedel
13. Nortorf
14. Oldenhütten
15. Schülp bei Nortorf
16. Timmaspe
17. Warder
