= Dätgen =

- Municipality
- Coat of arms

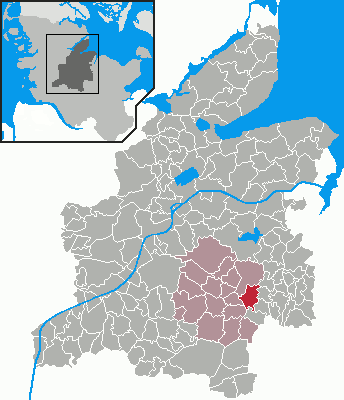
- Location of Dätgen within Rendsburg-Eckernförde district
- Interactive map of Dätgen
- Location within Germany Location within Schleswig-Holstein
- Coordinates: 54°10′N 9°55′E
- Country: Germany
- State: Schleswig-Holstein
- District: Rendsburg-Eckernförde
- Municipal assoc.: Nortorfer Land

Government
  - Mayor: Henry Ehlbeck

Area
  - Total: 10.61 km^{2} (4.10 sq mi)
- Elevation: 28 m (92 ft)

Population (2025-12-31)
  - Total: 553
  - Density: 52.1/km^{2} (135/sq mi)
- Time zone: UTC+01:00 (CET)
  - Summer (DST): UTC+02:00 (CEST)
- Postal codes: 24589
- Dialling codes: 04329
- Vehicle registration: RD
- Website: www.amt-nortorfer- land.de

Dätgen is a small village in the district of Rendsburg-Eckernförde, located in the center of Schleswig-Holstein, Germany.
