= Borgdorf-Seedorf =

- Municipality
- Coat of arms

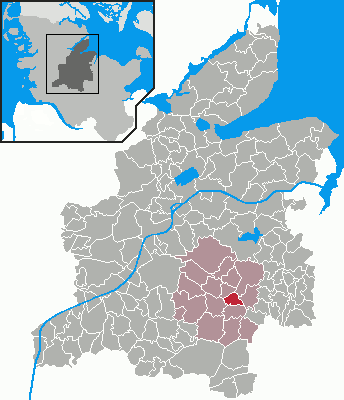
- Location of Borgdorf-Seedorf within Rendsburg-Eckernförde district
- Interactive map of Borgdorf-Seedorf
- Location within Germany Location within Schleswig-Holstein
- Coordinates: 54°10′N 09°52′E
- Country: Germany
- State: Schleswig-Holstein
- District: Rendsburg-Eckernförde
- Municipal assoc.: Nortorfer Land

Government
  - Mayor: Achim Trede

Area
  - Total: 6.63 km^{2} (2.56 sq mi)
- Elevation: 29 m (95 ft)

Population (2025-12-31)
  - Total: 423
  - Density: 63.8/km^{2} (165/sq mi)
- Time zone: UTC+01:00 (CET)
  - Summer (DST): UTC+02:00 (CEST)
- Postal codes: 24589
- Dialling codes: 04329
- Vehicle registration: RD
- Website: www.amt-nortorfer- land.de

Borgdorf-Seedorf is a municipality in the district of Rendsburg-Eckernförde, in Schleswig-Holstein, Germany.
