= Langwedel, Schleswig-Holstein =

Langwedel
- Municipality
- Coat of arms

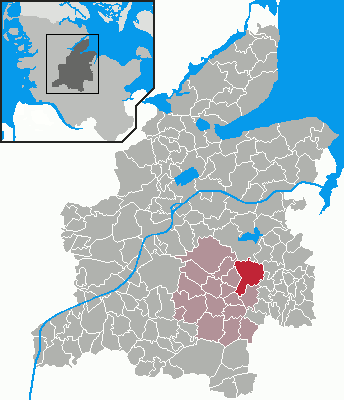
- Location of Langwedel within Rendsburg-Eckernförde district
- Interactive map of Langwedel
- Location within Germany Location within Schleswig-Holstein
- Coordinates: 54°13′N 9°56′E
- Country: Germany
- State: Schleswig-Holstein
- District: Rendsburg-Eckernförde
- Municipal assoc.: Nortorfer Land

Government
  - Mayor: Holger Spießhöfer (CDU)

Area
  - Total: 24.22 km^{2} (9.35 sq mi)
- Elevation: 30 m (98 ft)

Population (2025-12-31)
  - Total: 1,558
  - Density: 64.33/km^{2} (166.6/sq mi)
- Time zone: UTC+01:00 (CET)
  - Summer (DST): UTC+02:00 (CEST)
- Postal codes: 24631
- Dialling codes: 04329
- Vehicle registration: RD
- Website: www.amt-nortorfer- land.de

Langwedel (German pronunciation: [ˈlaŋveːdl̩]) is a municipality in the district of Rendsburg-Eckernförde, in Schleswig-Holstein, Germany.
