= Carl Christian Seydewitz =

Danish portrait painter and army officer

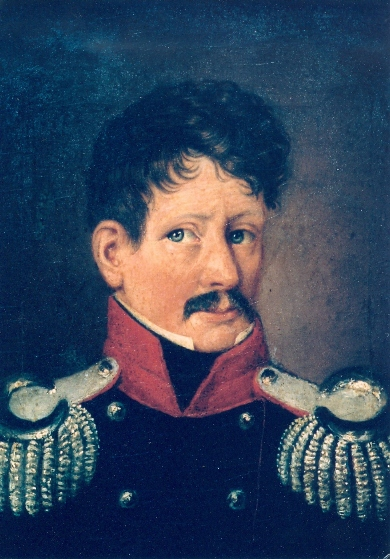
Self-portrait (1822)

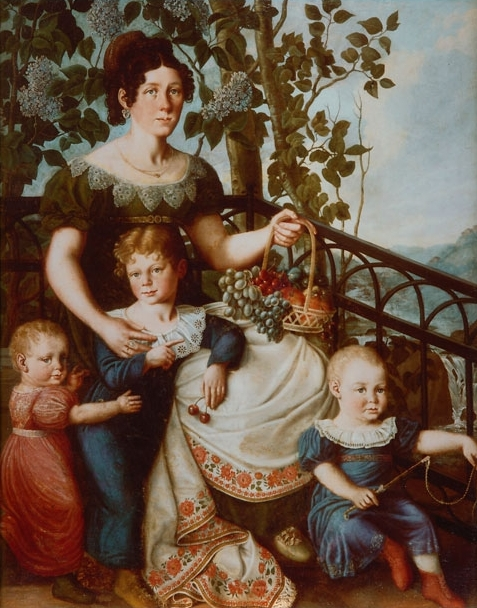
Seydewitz family portrait (c. 1818-1828)

Carl Christian von Seydewitz (3 November 1777 – 10 October 1857) was a Danish-German portrait painter and army officer. He was not a member of the nobility but, from 1770 to 1860, officers were allowed to use "von" with their surnames.

== Biography ==
von Seydewitz was born in Nortorf, Denmark. He was the son of Johann Christoph Heinrich von Seydewitz (1748-1824) and Magdalena Maria Ralfs. His father was an architect and builder in the rural districts of Mecklenburg. He followed his older brother, into the Royal Danish Army when he was only fourteen. In 1796, became a fændrik (roughly equivalent to ensign) à la suite in the Schleswig Regiment. He was promoted to First Lieutenant in 1804 and Captain in 1810. In 1816, due to cutbacks in troop strength, he was mustered out with the rank of Major.

Despite his choice of a military career, he always had a desire to be an artist. Around 1800, after some opposition by Crown Prince (later King) Frederick, he was allowed to attend classes at satellite schools of the Royal Academy. In 1803, he was awarded money from the Fonden ad usus publicos, a fund for the support of artistic and scientific endeavors. Normally, this would be used for study abroad, but he was compelled to use it locally. Later he received an additional grant and was allowed to study in Italy, where he was influenced by the works of Raphael. However, after the English Wars broke out in 1807, official duties occupied most of his time.

In 1814 he became a Knight of the Order of the Dannebrog. Two years later, He married Sophie Amalie Møller (1792-1863). In 1817, now a retired Major, he began to paint in earnest. His first major work was done for the Palace Building Commission. He was paid well, but his work was judged by the Royal Academy to be of little artistic value. King Frederick, wanting to make amends for his earlier opposition, ordered a large number of pieces; not only for the Royal palaces, but for church altarpieces as well. Nineteen of these went into the Royal Collection (now the National Gallery of Denmark). Many were lost during the devastating fire at Christiansborg Palace in 1884.

He died in 1857 and was buried at Garnisons Cemetery (Garnisons Kirkegård) in Copenhagen.
