= Ellerdorf =

- Municipality
- Coat of arms

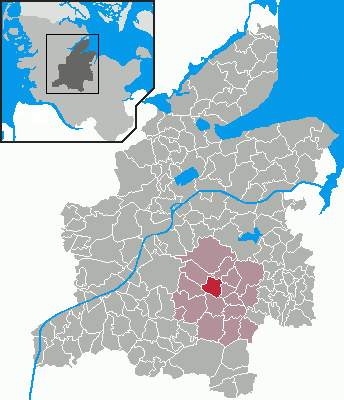
- Location of Ellerdorf within Rendsburg-Eckernförde district
- Interactive map of Ellerdorf
- Location within Germany Location within Schleswig-Holstein
- Coordinates: 54°11′48″N 9°50′32″E
- Country: Germany
- State: Schleswig-Holstein
- District: Rendsburg-Eckernförde
- Municipal assoc.: Nortorfer Land

Government
  - Mayor: Susanne Ott

Area
  - Total: 10.2 km^{2} (3.9 sq mi)
- Elevation: 22 m (72 ft)

Population (2025-12-31)
  - Total: 504
  - Density: 49.4/km^{2} (128/sq mi)
- Time zone: UTC+01:00 (CET)
  - Summer (DST): UTC+02:00 (CEST)
- Postal codes: 24589
- Dialling codes: 04392
- Vehicle registration: RD
- Website: www.amt-nortorfer- land.de

Ellerdorf (German pronunciation: [ˈɛlɐdɔʁf]) is a municipality in the district of Rendsburg-Eckernförde, in Schleswig-Holstein, Germany.
