= Groß Vollstedt =

- Municipality
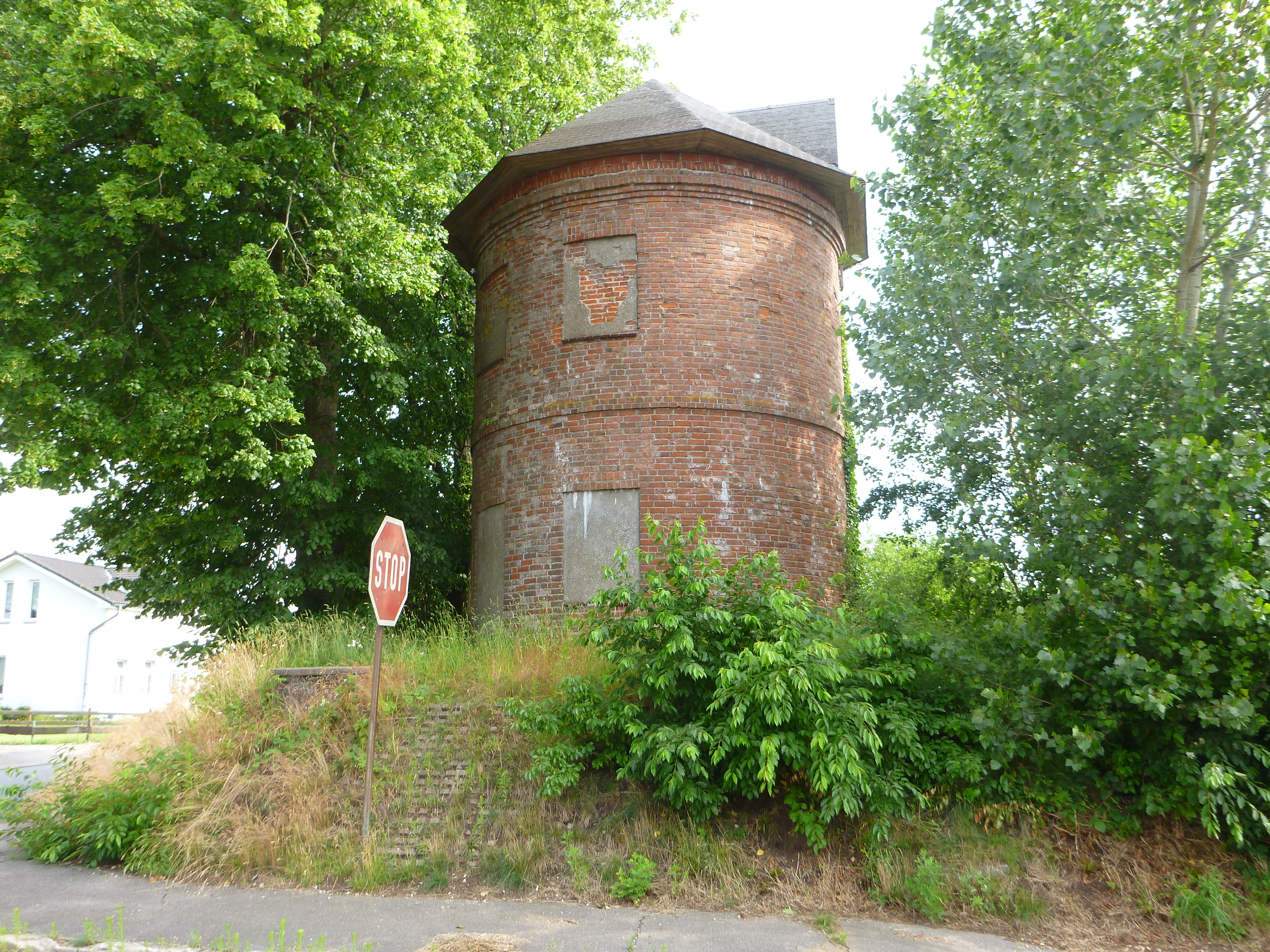
- Water tower in Groß Vollstedt

- Coat of arms

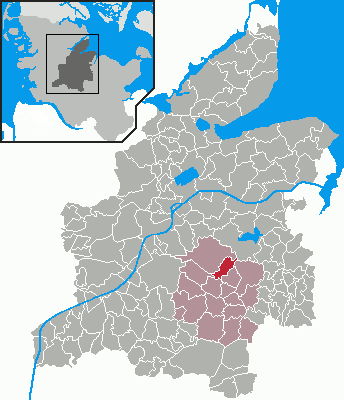
- Location of Groß Vollstedt within Rendsburg-Eckernförde district
- Interactive map of Groß Vollstedt
- Location within Germany Location within Schleswig-Holstein
- Coordinates: 54°13′N 9°52′E
- Country: Germany
- State: Schleswig-Holstein
- District: Rendsburg-Eckernförde
- Municipal assoc.: Nortorfer Land

Government
  - Mayor: Thorsten Ladewig (SPD)

Area
  - Total: 9.02 km^{2} (3.48 sq mi)
- Elevation: 24 m (79 ft)

Population (2025-12-31)
  - Total: 955
  - Density: 106/km^{2} (274/sq mi)
- Time zone: UTC+01:00 (CET)
  - Summer (DST): UTC+02:00 (CEST)
- Postal codes: 24802
- Dialling codes: 04305
- Vehicle registration: RD
- Website: https://www.gross-vollstedt.de/

Groß Vollstedt (German pronunciation: [ɡʁoːs ˈfɔlʃtɛt]) is a municipality in the district of Rendsburg-Eckernförde, in Schleswig-Holstein, Germany. The village is located in the triangle between the cities Rendsburg, Kiel and Neumünster and the highways A 7, A 210 and A 215. The lakes Vollstedter See and Brahmsee are located in the vicinity.

At the end of the 19th century, a water tower was erected in Groß Vollstedt. The tower is still preserved but it is no longer in use.
