= Nortorf =

- Town
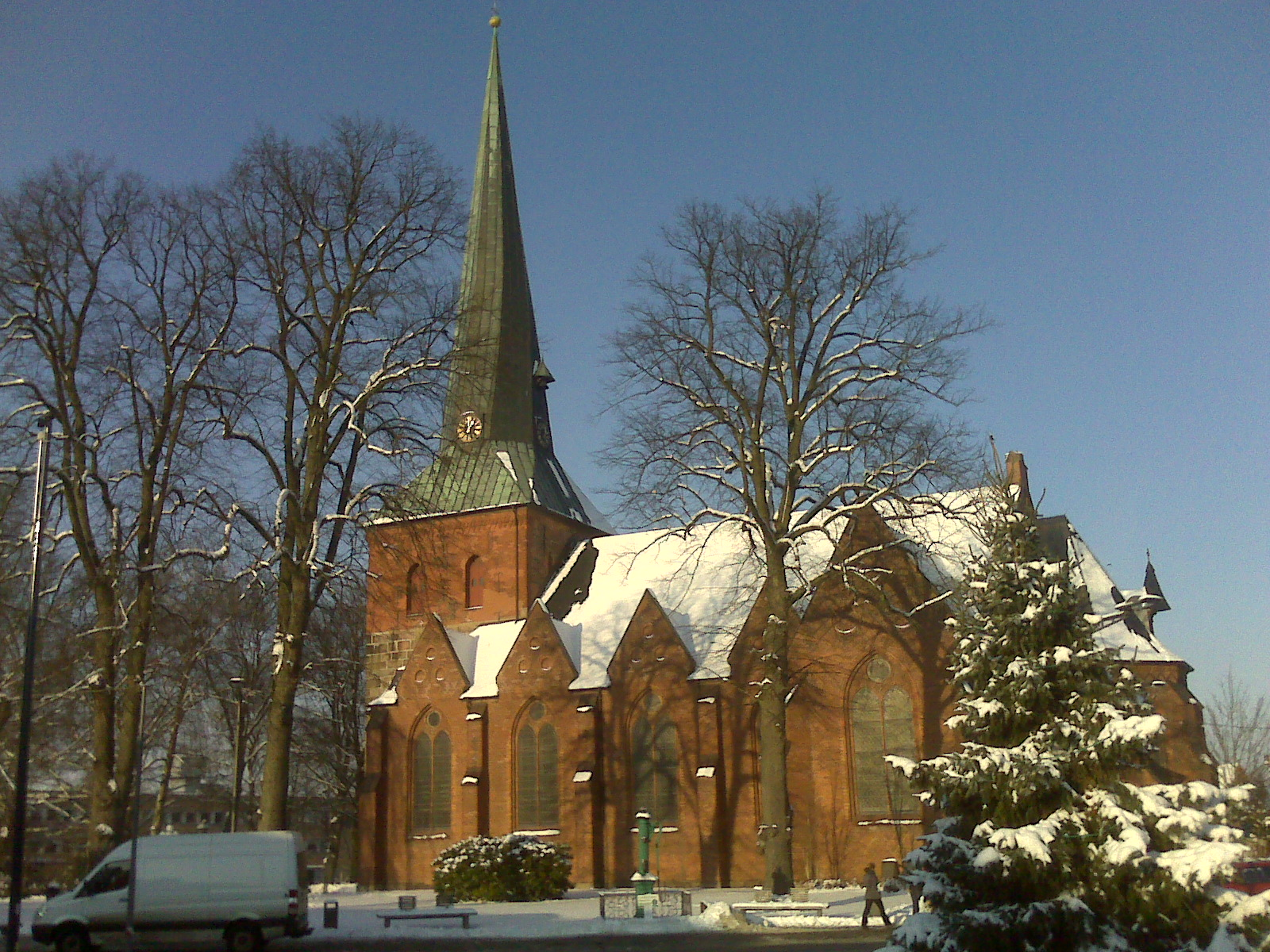
- Saint Martin Church

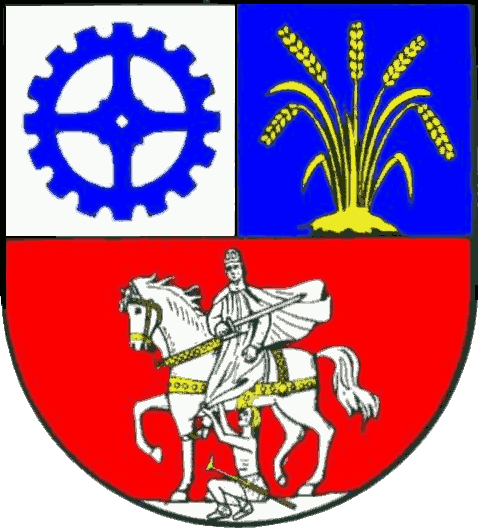
- Coat of arms

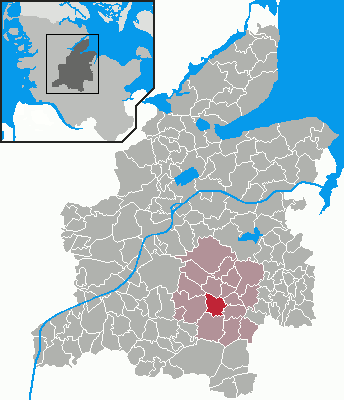
- Location of Nortorf within Rendsburg-Eckernförde district
- Interactive map of Nortorf
- Location within Germany Location within Schleswig-Holstein
- Coordinates: 54°10′N 9°52′E
- Country: Germany
- State: Schleswig-Holstein
- District: Rendsburg-Eckernförde
- Municipal assoc.: Nortorfer Land

Government
  - Mayor: Uwe Bestehorn (CDU)

Area
  - Total: 12.77 km^{2} (4.93 sq mi)
- Elevation: 27 m (89 ft)

Population (2025-12-31)
  - Total: 7,251
  - Density: 567.8/km^{2} (1,471/sq mi)
- Time zone: UTC+01:00 (CET)
  - Summer (DST): UTC+02:00 (CEST)
- Postal codes: 24589
- Dialling codes: 04392
- Vehicle registration: RD
- Website: www.amt-nortorfer-land.de

Nortorf (German pronunciation: [ˈnɔʁtɔʁf]; Low German: Noorddörp) is a town in the district of Rendsburg-Eckernförde, in Schleswig-Holstein, Germany. It is approximately 13 km northwest of Neumünster, and 25 km southwest of Kiel.

== Geography ==
The location of Nortorf is south of the municipality of Ellerdorf, but north of Gnutz, and east of Bargstedt.

== History ==
Nortorf acquired the status of a city on July 17, 1909. Previously, in summer 1899, the first town hall had been opened in Nortorf.

As a consequence of World War II, Nortorf experienced a significant influx of refugees, displaced persons and evacuees, raising its population from 3359 (May 1939) to 6047 (October 1946).

== Personalities ==
- Martin Ehlers (1732–1800), educational reformer and philosopher
- Carl Christian Seydewitz (1777–1857), portrait painter
- Harboe Kardel (1893–1982), Nazi journalist
- Hans Sommer (SS officer) (1914–?), SS officer and spy Organization Gehlen
- Kurt Hamer (1926–1991), Social Democratic politician
- Oliver Stern (born 1953), country singer and songwriter, lyricist, music producer and book author
- Sabine Kaack (born 1959), actress

=== Connected to Nortorf ===
- Joshua Bluhm (born 1994) German bobsledder and lives in Nortorf
- Peter Voß (1891–1979) German actor
