= Brammer =

- Municipality
- Coat of arms

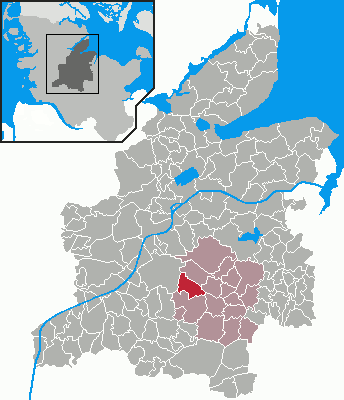
- Location of Brammer within Rendsburg-Eckernförde district
- Interactive map of Brammer
- Location within Germany Location within Schleswig-Holstein
- Coordinates: 54°12′N 9°46′E
- Country: Germany
- State: Schleswig-Holstein
- District: Rendsburg-Eckernförde
- Municipal assoc.: Nortorfer Land

Government
  - Mayor: Gabriele Mester

Area
  - Total: 13.66 km^{2} (5.27 sq mi)
- Elevation: 21 m (69 ft)

Population (2025-12-31)
  - Total: 339
  - Density: 24.8/km^{2} (64.3/sq mi)
- Time zone: UTC+01:00 (CET)
  - Summer (DST): UTC+02:00 (CEST)
- Postal codes: 24793
- Dialling codes: 04392
- Vehicle registration: RD
- Website: www.brammer.de

Brammer (German pronunciation: [ˈbʁamɐ]) is a municipality in the district of Rendsburg-Eckernförde, in Schleswig-Holstein, Germany.
