= Bovenau =

- Municipality
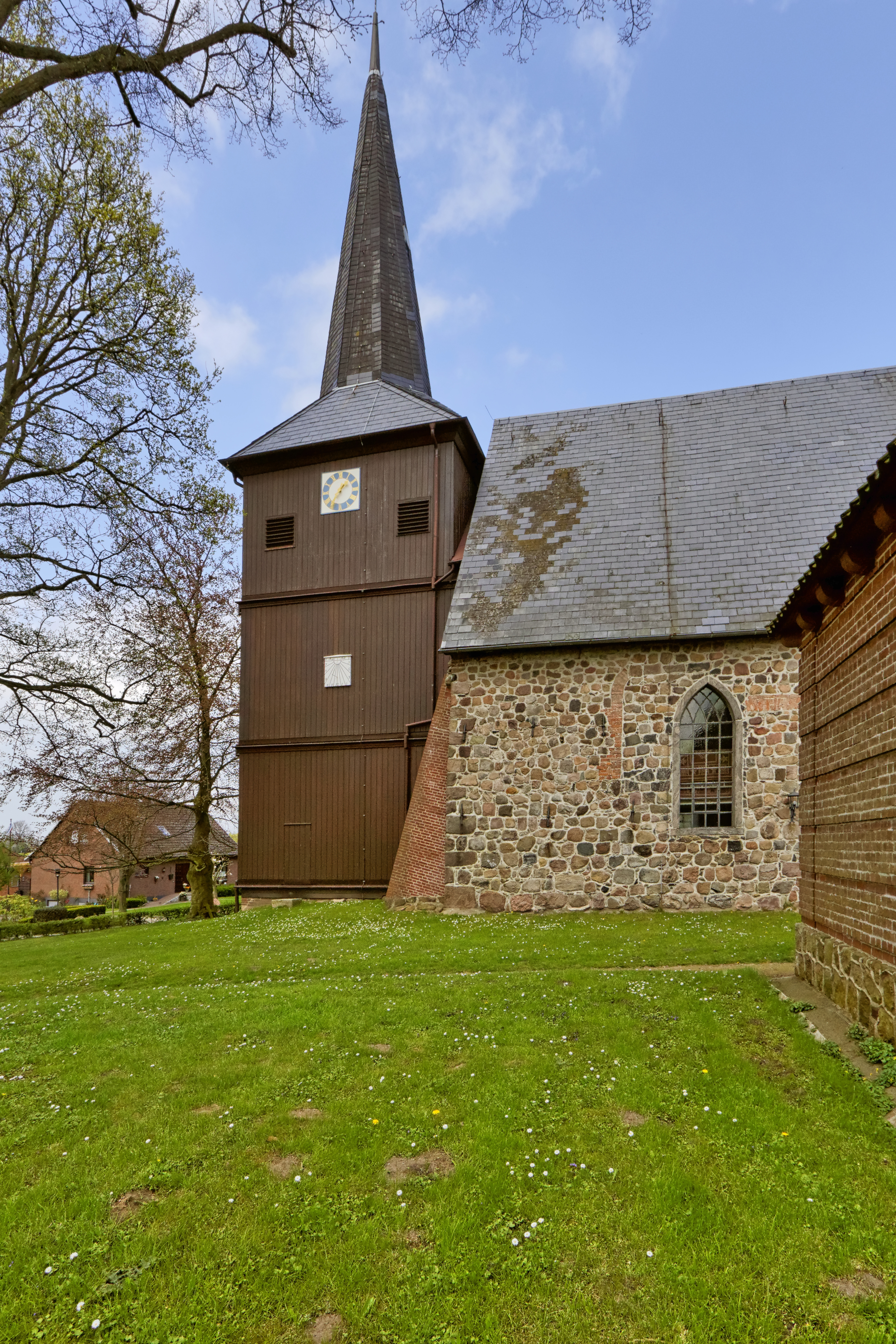
- Maria Magdalena Church

- Coat of arms

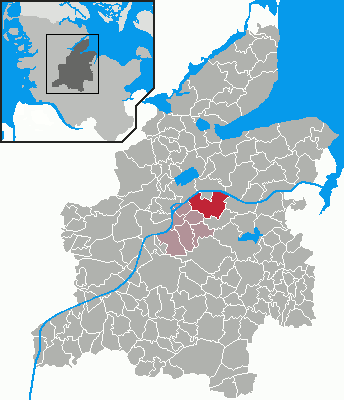
- Location of Bovenau within Rendsburg-Eckernförde district
- Interactive map of Bovenau
- Location within Germany Location within Schleswig-Holstein
- Coordinates: 54°20′N 9°50′E
- Country: Germany
- State: Schleswig-Holstein
- District: Rendsburg-Eckernförde
- Municipal assoc.: Eiderkanal

Government
  - Mayor: Daniel Ambrock

Area
  - Total: 26.2 km^{2} (10.1 sq mi)
- Elevation: 13 m (43 ft)

Population (2025-12-31)
  - Total: 1,097
  - Density: 41.9/km^{2} (108/sq mi)
- Time zone: UTC+01:00 (CET)
  - Summer (DST): UTC+02:00 (CEST)
- Postal codes: 24796
- Dialling codes: 04331, 04334, 04357
- Vehicle registration: RD
- Website: www.bovenau.de

Bovenau is a village in the district of Rendsburg-Eckernförde, in the German state of Schleswig-Holstein. Bovenau is only 16 metres (52 ft) above sea level. The location is south of the municipality of Bünsdorf or Sehestedt, but north of Ostenfeld, Bredenbek, and west of Krummwisch, about 20 km (12 mi) away from the center of Kiel.

== History ==
Bovenau was first mentioned in 1240 as Kirchdorf. The name is derived from the Low German „boven de Au“, which means something like "above the creek". Several megalithic tombs have been found in the area of the settlement. Estates are located in the surrounding area: Gut Dengelsberg, Gut Georgenthal, Gut Kluvensiek, Gut Osterrade, Gut Steinwehr.

== Buildings ==
The Maria Magdalena Church and the lock of the old Eider Canal in Kluvensiek are worth seeing.

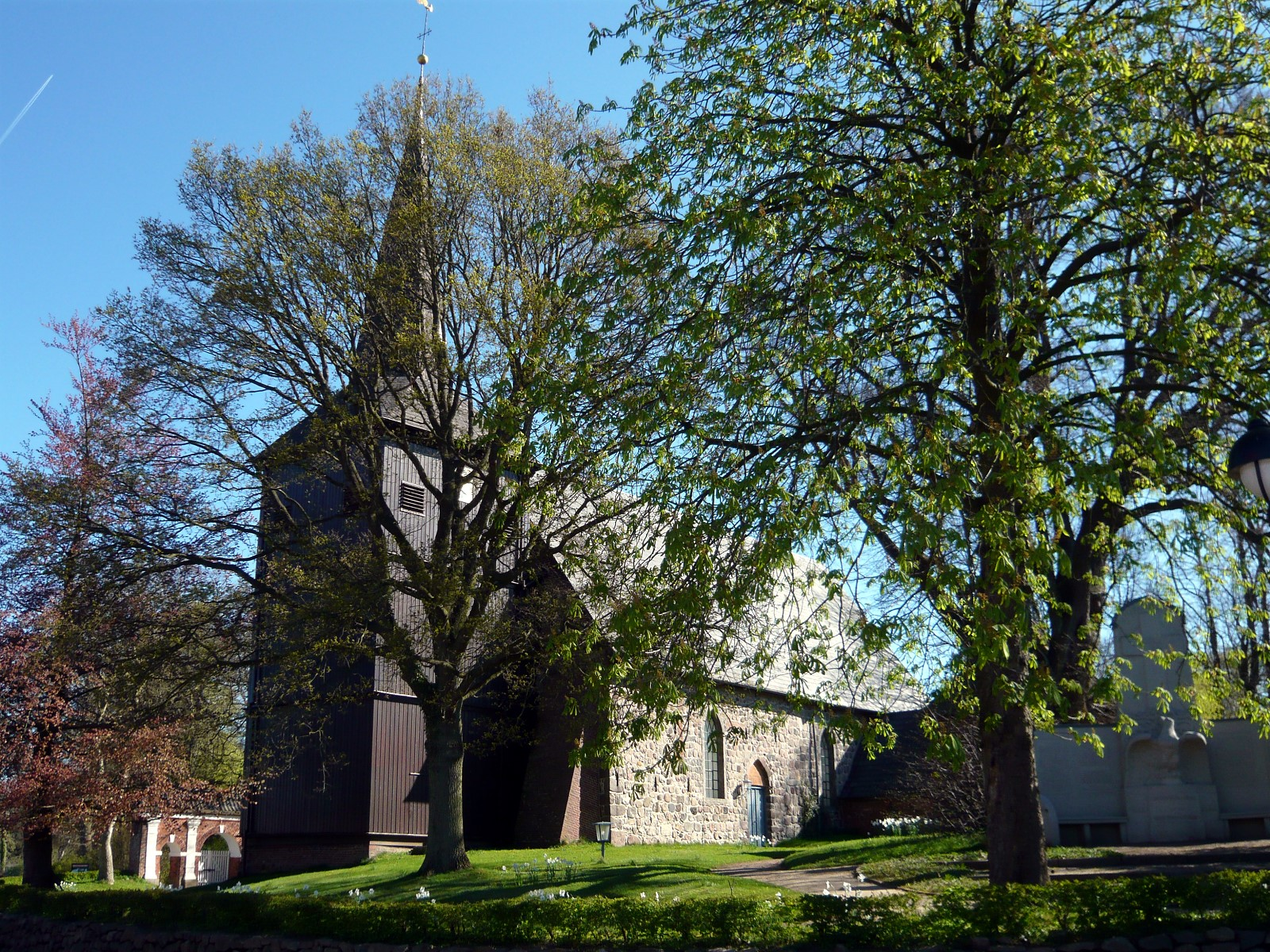
Maria Magdalena Church in Bovenau

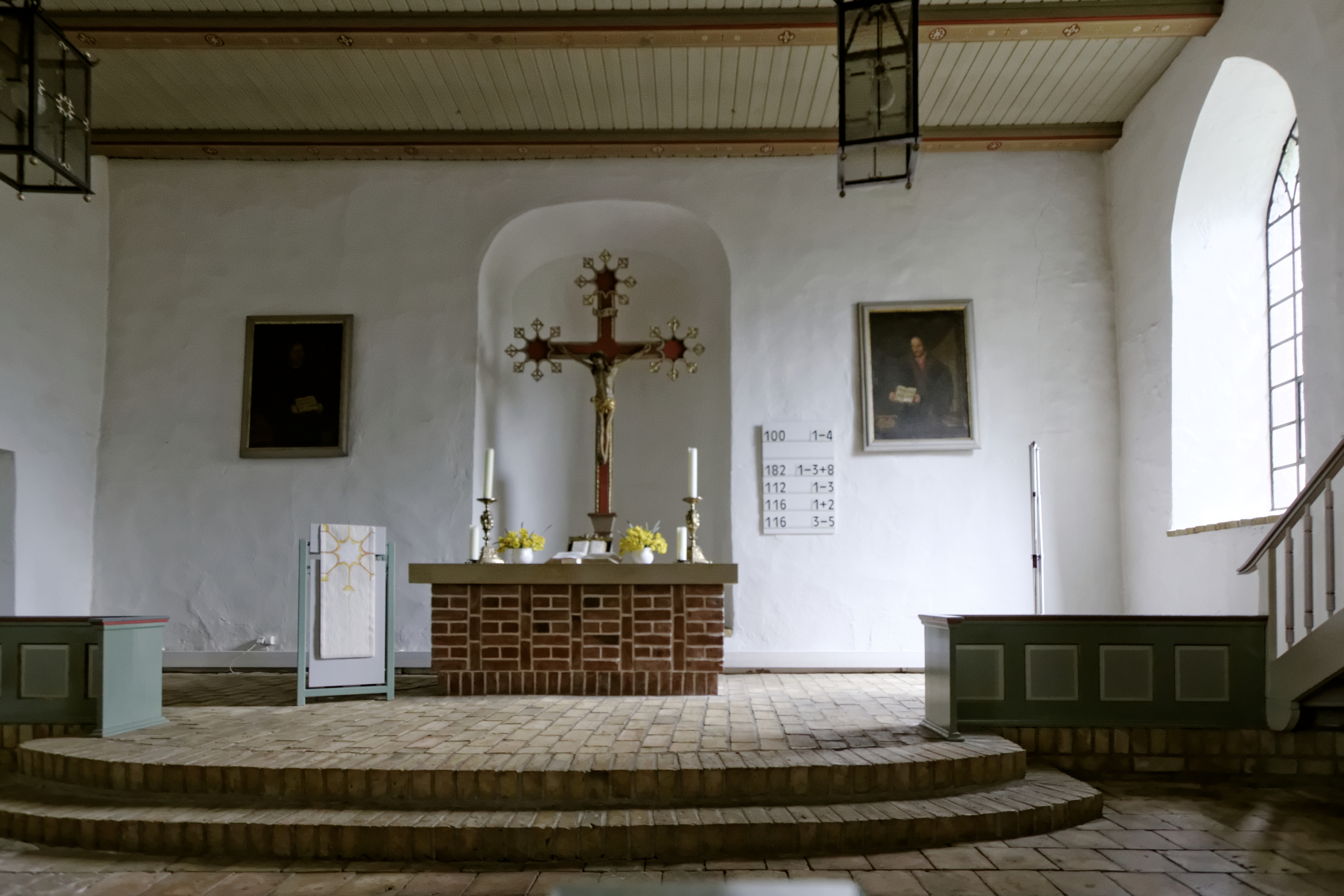
Church, inner space

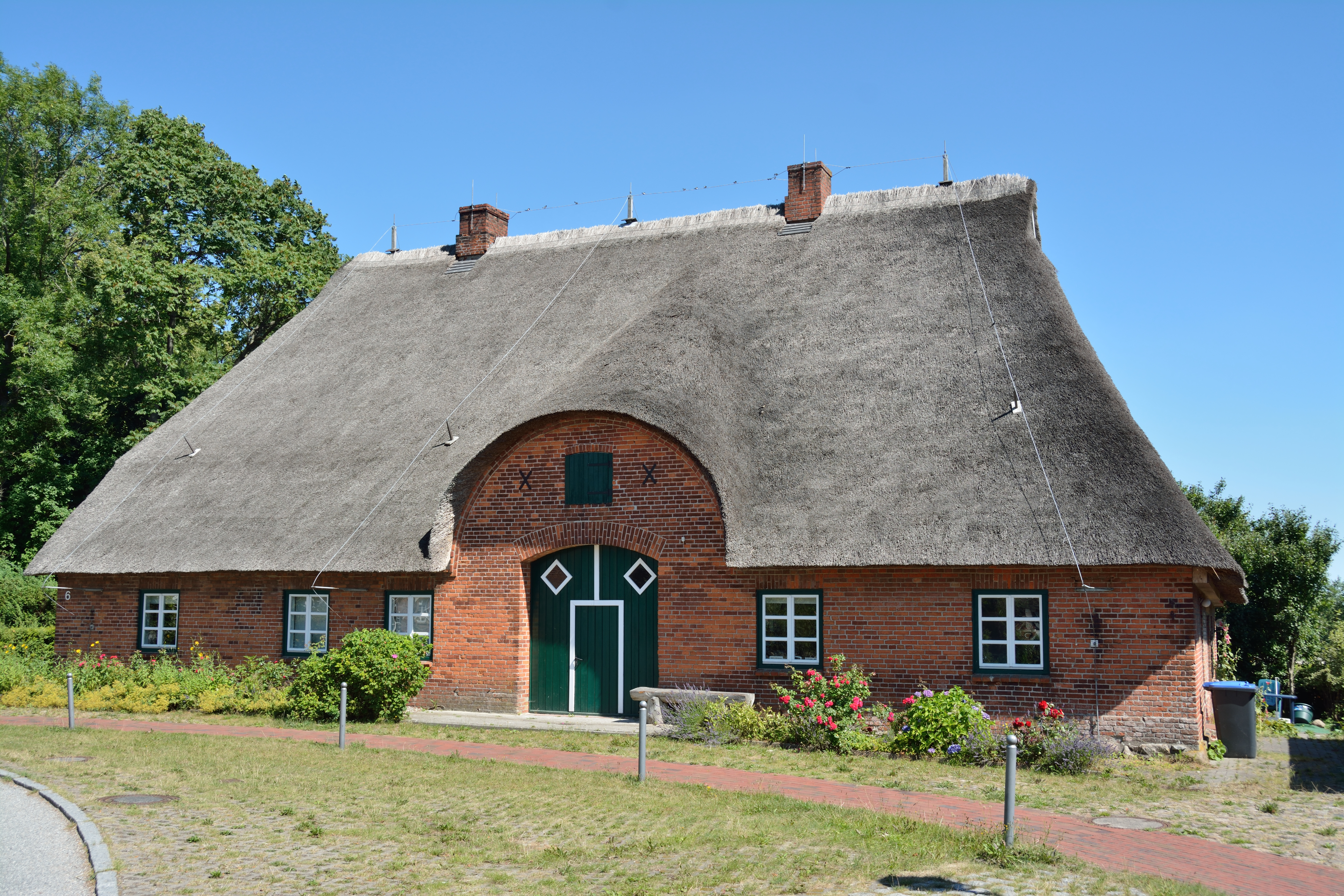
Near the church, former school

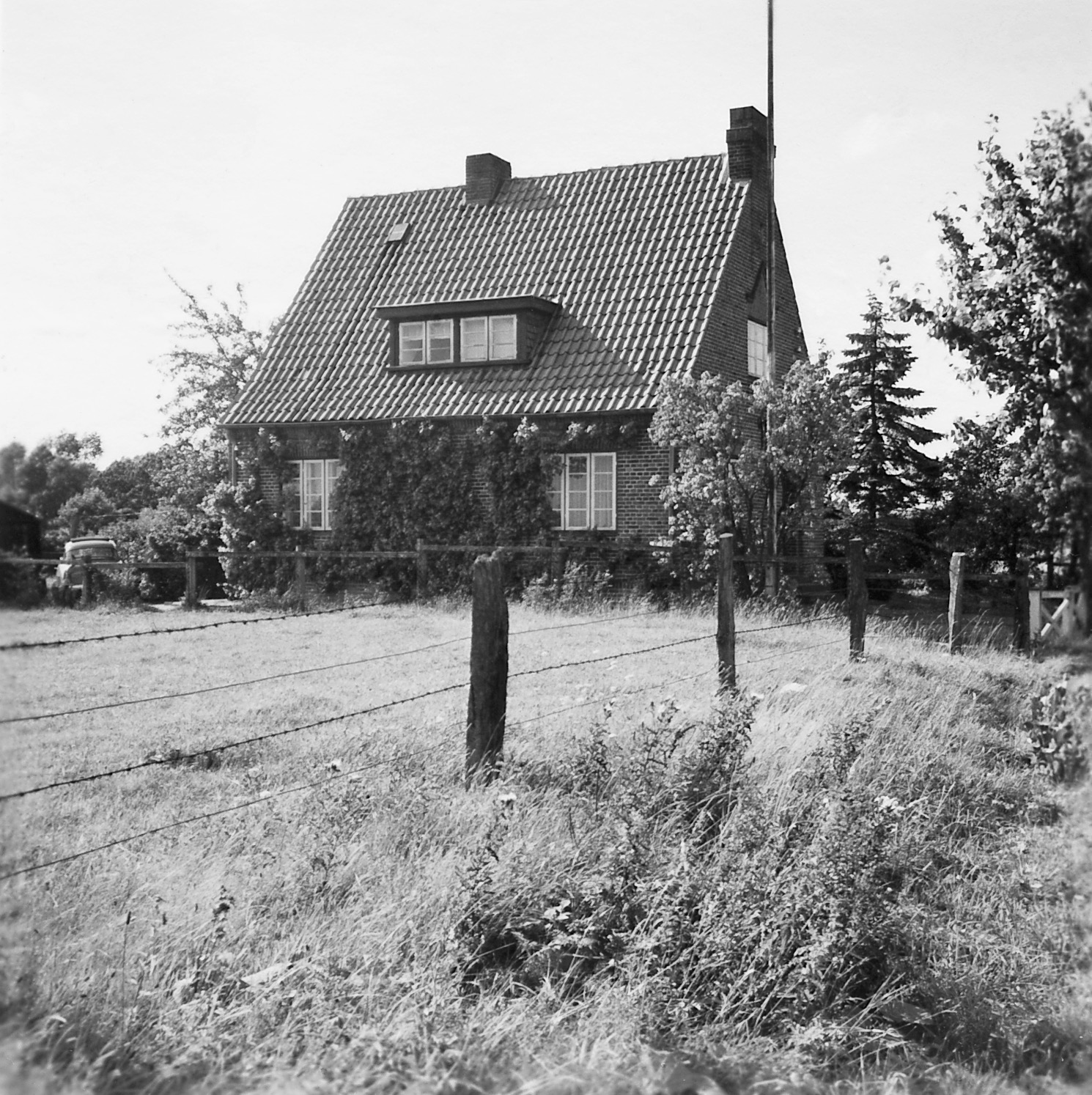
Ingo Kühl's birthplace, former police station in Bovenau, 1957

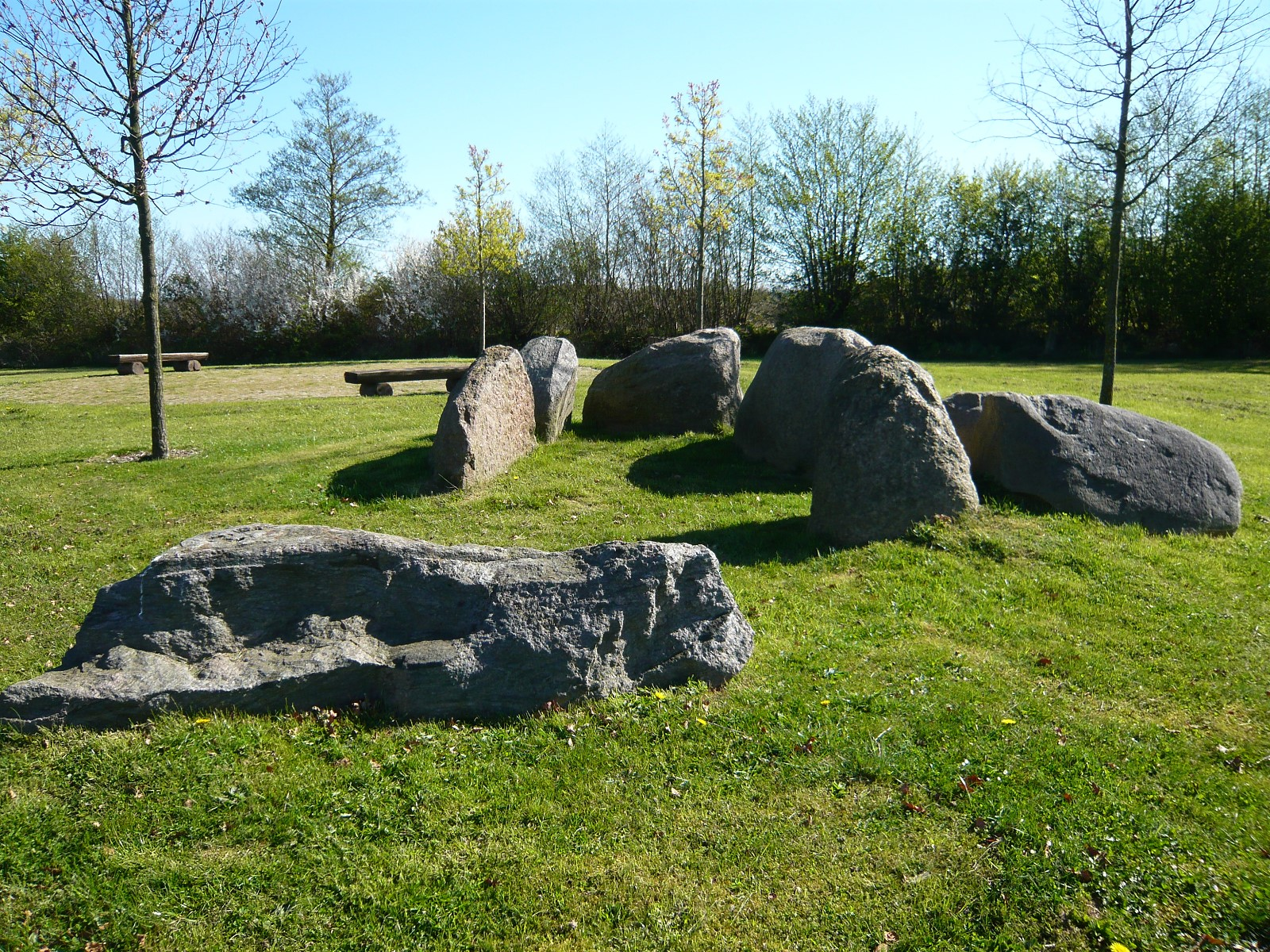
Reconstructed megalithic tomb

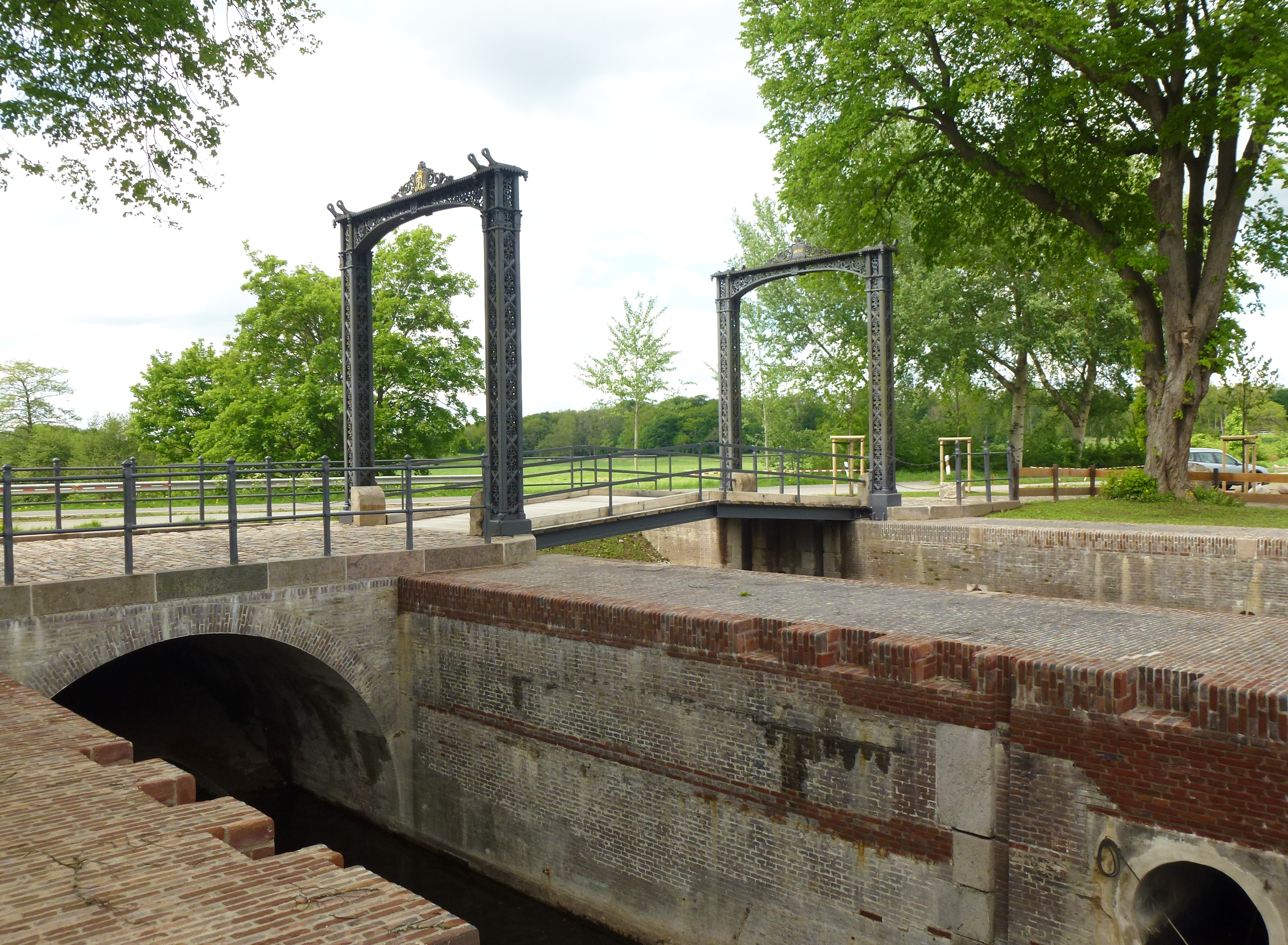
Kluvensiek, lock of the old Eider Canal

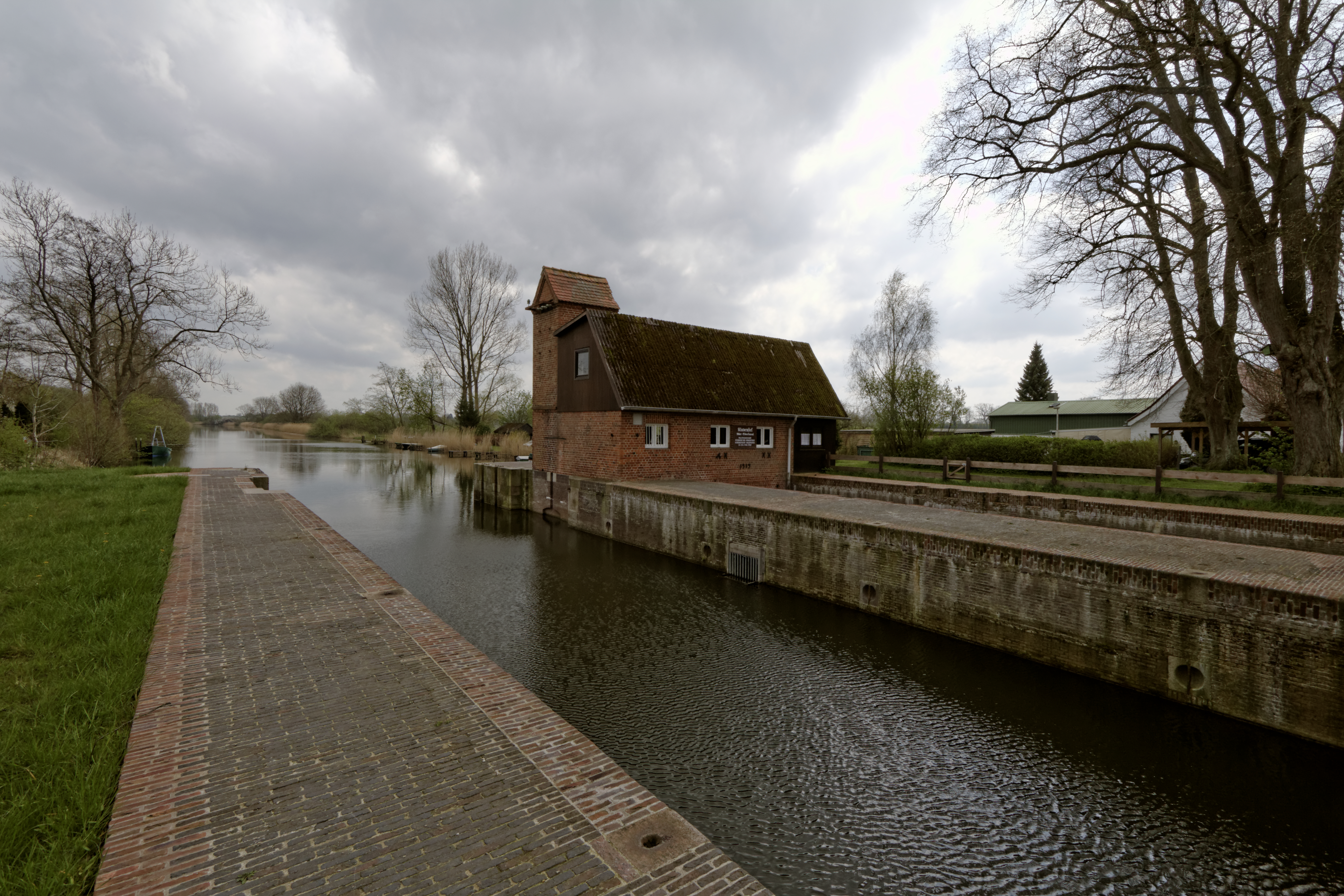
Kluvensiek, lock

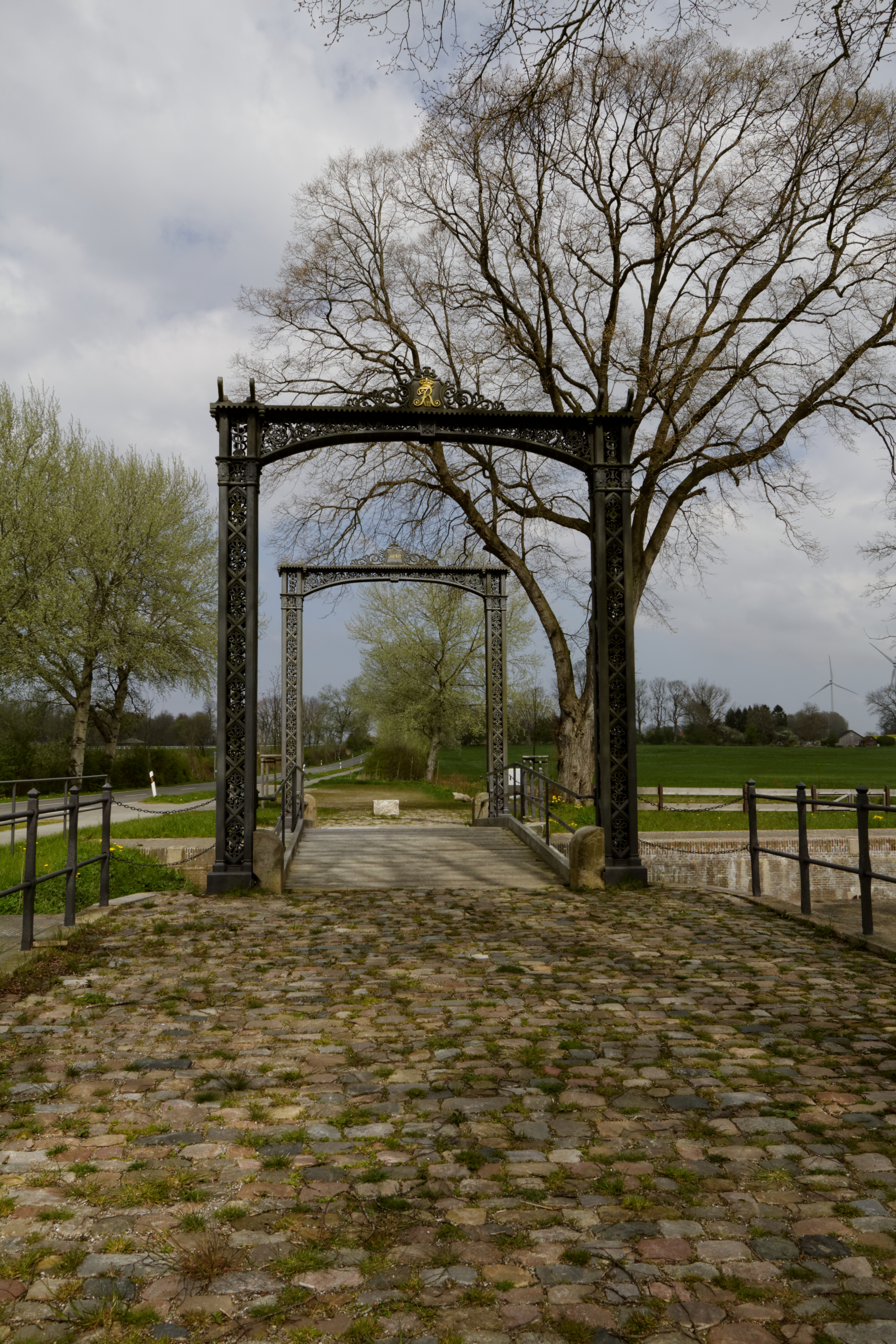
Kluvensiek, lock, iron gates of the former bascule bridge

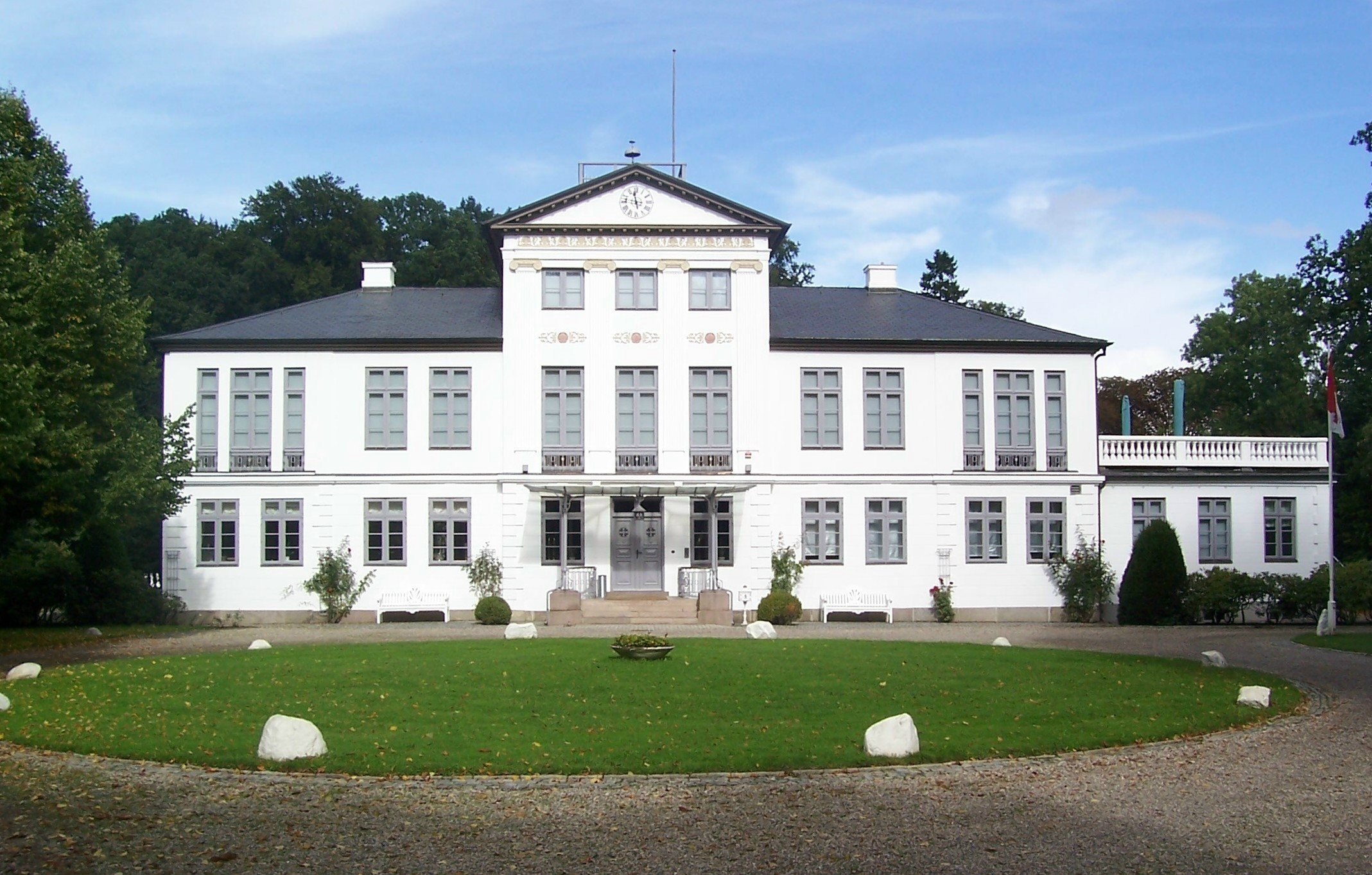
Estate Kluvensiek

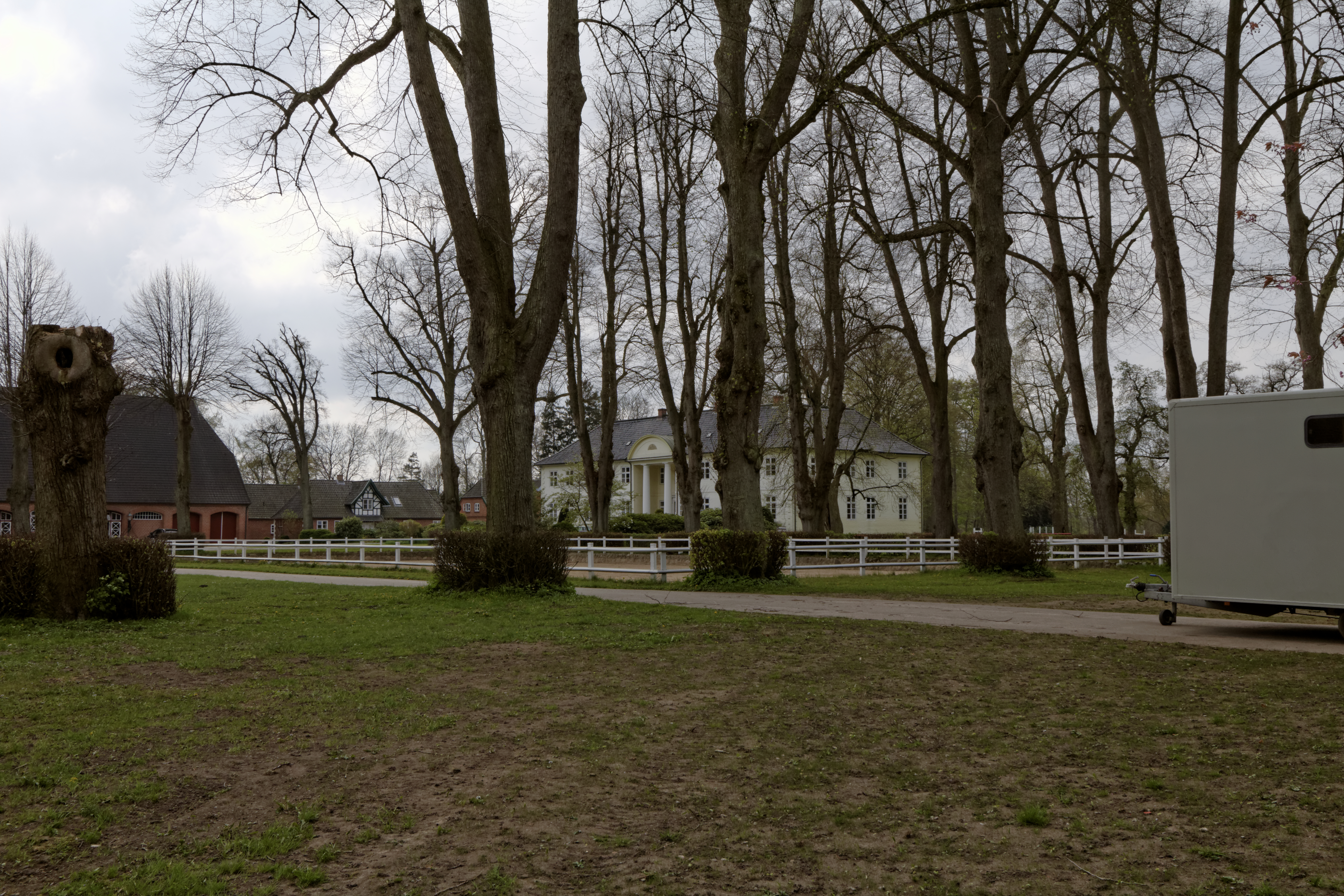
Estate Osterrade

Map of Bovenau and surroundings (c. 1850)

== Sons and daughters of the village ==
- The lawyer Benedikt Heins was born in 1710 in Bovenau, he died in Hamburg in 1774.
- The painter and sculptor Ingo Kühl was born in 1953 in Bovenau and grew up there until 1964.

== Bibliography ==
Chronik Bovenau, 2007
