= Schülp bei Nortorf =

- Municipality
- Coat of arms

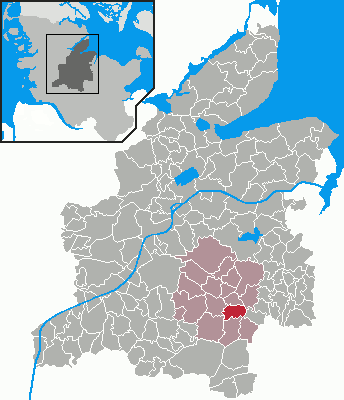
- Location of Schülp bei Nortorf within Rendsburg-Eckernförde district
- Interactive map of Schülp bei Nortorf
- Location within Germany Location within Schleswig-Holstein
- Coordinates: 54°9′48″N 9°53′2″E
- Country: Germany
- State: Schleswig-Holstein
- District: Rendsburg-Eckernförde
- Municipal assoc.: Nortorfer Land

Government
  - Mayor: Volker Ratjen

Area
  - Total: 9.85 km^{2} (3.80 sq mi)
- Elevation: 29 m (95 ft)

Population (2025-12-31)
  - Total: 787
  - Density: 79.9/km^{2} (207/sq mi)
- Time zone: UTC+01:00 (CET)
  - Summer (DST): UTC+02:00 (CEST)
- Postal codes: 24589
- Dialling codes: 04392
- Vehicle registration: RD
- Website: www.amt-nortorfer- land.de

Schülp bei Nortorf (German pronunciation: [ˈʃʏlp baɪ ˈnɔʁtɔʁf], lit. 'Schülp near Nortorf') is a municipality in the district of Rendsburg-Eckernförde, in Schleswig-Holstein, Germany.
