= Rade bei Rendsburg =

- Municipality
- Coat of arms

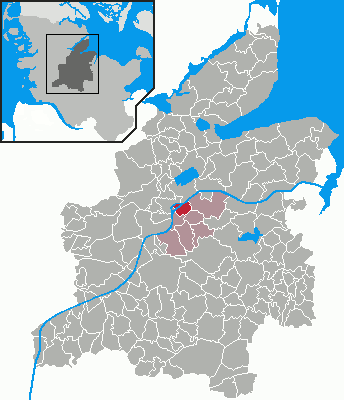
- Location of Rade bei Rendsburg within Rendsburg-Eckernförde district
- Interactive map of Rade bei Rendsburg
- Location within Germany Location within Schleswig-Holstein
- Coordinates: 54°20′N 9°45′E
- Country: Germany
- State: Schleswig-Holstein
- District: Rendsburg-Eckernförde
- Municipal assoc.: Eiderkanal

Government
  - Mayor: Hans Stephan Lütje

Area
  - Total: 6.52 km^{2} (2.52 sq mi)
- Elevation: 15 m (49 ft)

Population (2025-12-31)
  - Total: 220
  - Density: 34/km^{2} (87/sq mi)
- Time zone: UTC+01:00 (CET)
  - Summer (DST): UTC+02:00 (CEST)
- Postal codes: 24790
- Dialling codes: 04331
- Vehicle registration: RD
- Website: www.amt- eiderkanal.de

Rade bei Rendsburg (German pronunciation: [ˈʁaːdə baɪ ˈʁɛntsbʊʁk], lit. 'Rade near Rendsburg') is a municipality in the district of Rendsburg-Eckernförde, in Schleswig-Holstein, Germany.
