= Bokel, Rendsburg-Eckernförde =

Bokel
- Municipality
- Coat of arms

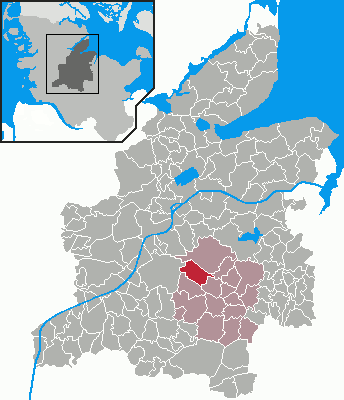
- Location of Bokel within Rendsburg-Eckernförde district
- Interactive map of Bokel
- Location within Germany Location within Schleswig-Holstein
- Coordinates: 54°13′N 9°48′E
- Country: Germany
- State: Schleswig-Holstein
- District: Rendsburg-Eckernförde
- Municipal assoc.: Nortorfer Land

Government
  - Mayor: Ralf Horstmann

Area
  - Total: 15.27 km^{2} (5.90 sq mi)
- Elevation: 18 m (59 ft)

Population (2025-12-31)
  - Total: 595
  - Density: 39.0/km^{2} (101/sq mi)
- Time zone: UTC+01:00 (CET)
  - Summer (DST): UTC+02:00 (CEST)
- Postal codes: 24802
- Dialling codes: 04330
- Vehicle registration: RD
- Website: www.amt-nortorfer- land.de

Bokel (German pronunciation: [ˈboːkl̩]) is a municipality in the district of Rendsburg-Eckernförde, in Schleswig-Holstein, Germany.
