= Haßmoor =

- Municipality
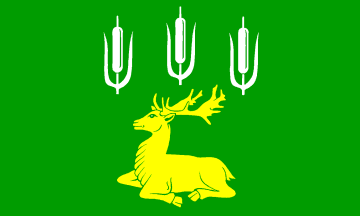
- Flag Coat of arms

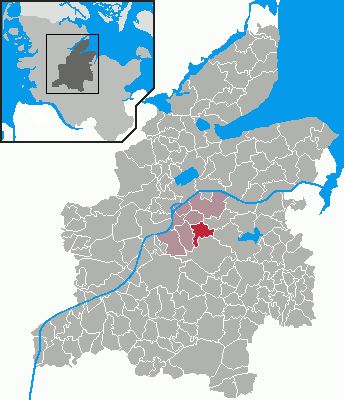
- Location of Haßmoor within Rendsburg-Eckernförde district
- Interactive map of Haßmoor
- Location within Germany Location within Schleswig-Holstein
- Coordinates: 54°17′37″N 9°49′13″E
- Country: Germany
- State: Schleswig-Holstein
- District: Rendsburg-Eckernförde
- Municipal assoc.: Eiderkanal

Government
  - Mayor: Eggert Voss

Area
  - Total: 10.28 km^{2} (3.97 sq mi)
- Elevation: 21 m (69 ft)

Population (2025-12-31)
  - Total: 251
  - Density: 24.4/km^{2} (63.2/sq mi)
- Time zone: UTC+01:00 (CET)
  - Summer (DST): UTC+02:00 (CEST)
- Postal codes: 24783
- Dialling codes: 04330, 04331
- Vehicle registration: RD
- Website: www.amt- eiderkanal.de

Haßmoor is a municipality in the district of Rendsburg-Eckernförde, in Schleswig-Holstein, Germany.
