= Schülldorf =

- Municipality
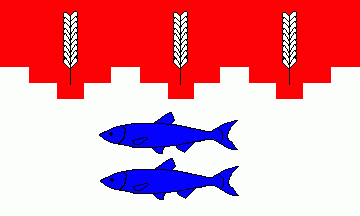
- Flag Coat of arms

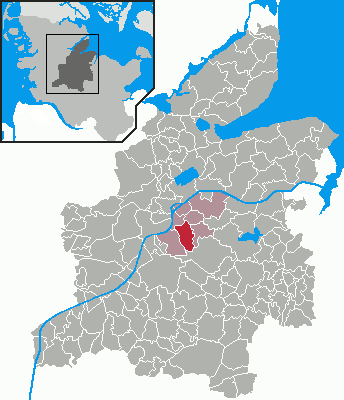
- Location of Schülldorf within Rendsburg-Eckernförde district
- Interactive map of Schülldorf
- Location within Germany Location within Schleswig-Holstein
- Coordinates: 54°18′N 9°44′E
- Country: Germany
- State: Schleswig-Holstein
- District: Rendsburg-Eckernförde
- Municipal assoc.: Eiderkanal

Government
  - Mayor: Heinke Desens

Area
  - Total: 12.99 km^{2} (5.02 sq mi)
- Elevation: 10 m (33 ft)

Population (2025-12-31)
  - Total: 791
  - Density: 60.9/km^{2} (158/sq mi)
- Time zone: UTC+01:00 (CET)
  - Summer (DST): UTC+02:00 (CEST)
- Postal codes: 24790
- Dialling codes: 04331
- Vehicle registration: RD
- Website: www.amt- eiderkanal.de

Schülldorf (German pronunciation: [ˈʃʏldɔʁf]) is a municipality in the district of Rendsburg-Eckernförde, in Schleswig-Holstein, Germany.
