= Levensau (river) =

River in Germany

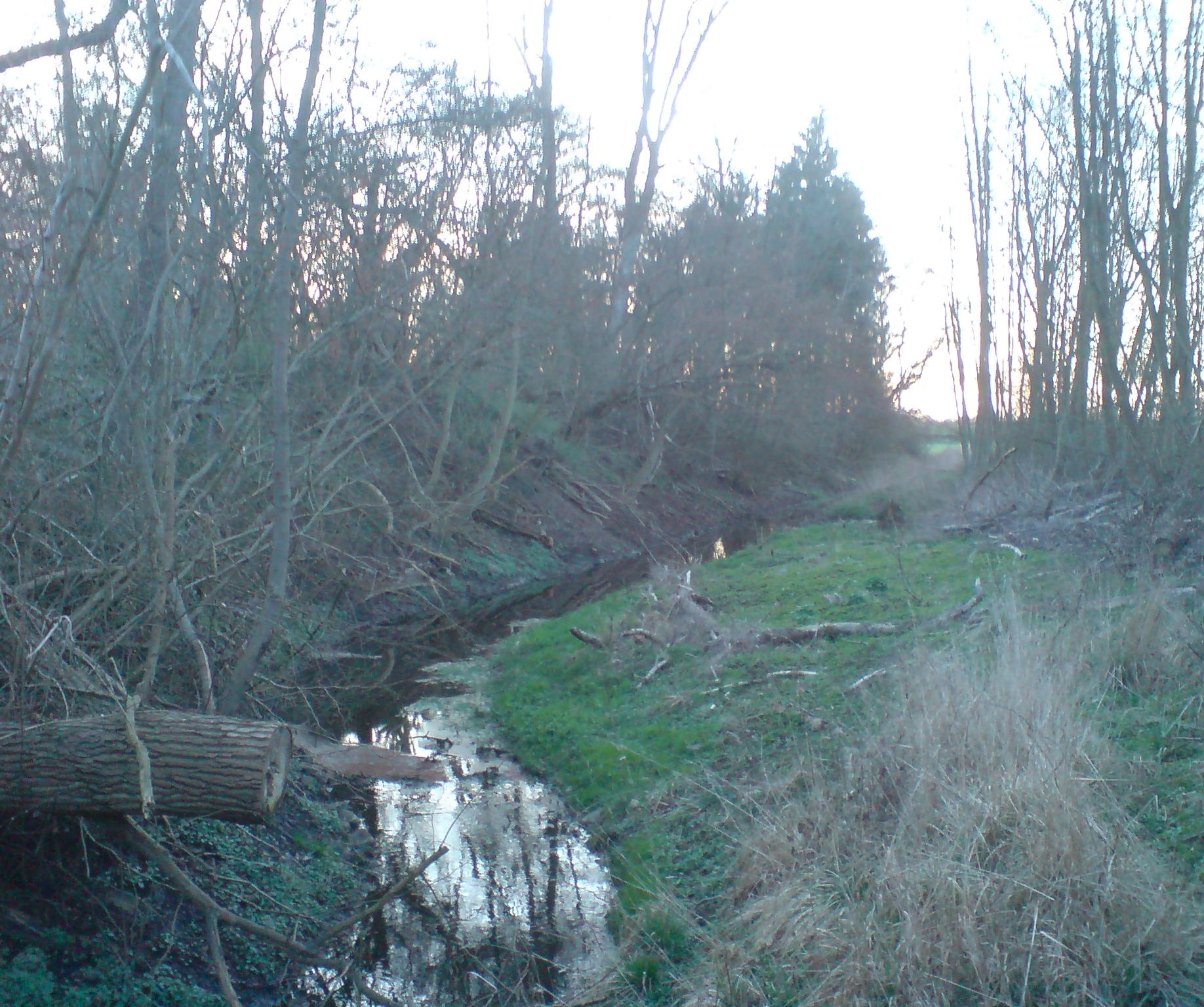
- Levensau, about 100 m before its mouth

Location
- Country: Germany
- State: Schleswig-Holstein

Physical characteristics
- Source
  - coordinates: 54.3627°N 9.9889°E
- Mouth
  - location: near Neuwittenbek into the Kiel Canal
  - coordinates: 54.3526°N 10.0008°E

Basin features
- Progression: Kiel Canal→ Elbe→ North Sea

Levensau is a river of Schleswig-Holstein, Germany. It is a tributary of the Kiel Canal near Neuwittenbek.

== See also ==
- List of rivers of Schleswig-Holstein
