= Ostenfeld, Rendsburg-Eckernförde =

Ostenfeld
- Municipality
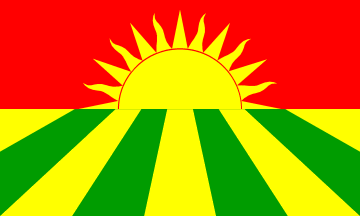
- Flag Coat of arms

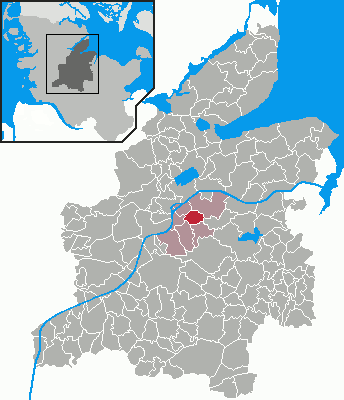
- Location of Ostenfeld within Rendsburg-Eckernförde district
- Interactive map of Ostenfeld
- Location within Germany Location within Schleswig-Holstein
- Coordinates: 54°18′56″N 9°47′13″E
- Country: Germany
- State: Schleswig-Holstein
- District: Rendsburg-Eckernförde
- Municipal assoc.: Eiderkanal

Government
  - Mayor: Hans-Jürgen Lütje

Area
  - Total: 7.27 km^{2} (2.81 sq mi)
- Elevation: 15 m (49 ft)

Population (2025-12-31)
  - Total: 596
  - Density: 82.0/km^{2} (212/sq mi)
- Time zone: UTC+01:00 (CET)
  - Summer (DST): UTC+02:00 (CEST)
- Postal codes: 24790
- Dialling codes: 04331
- Vehicle registration: RD
- Website: www.amt- eiderkanal.de

Ostenfeld (German pronunciation: [ˈɔstn̩fɛlt]) is a municipality in the district of Rendsburg-Eckernförde, in Schleswig-Holstein, Germany.
