= Hütten Hills =

Hills in Germany

Logo of the nature park

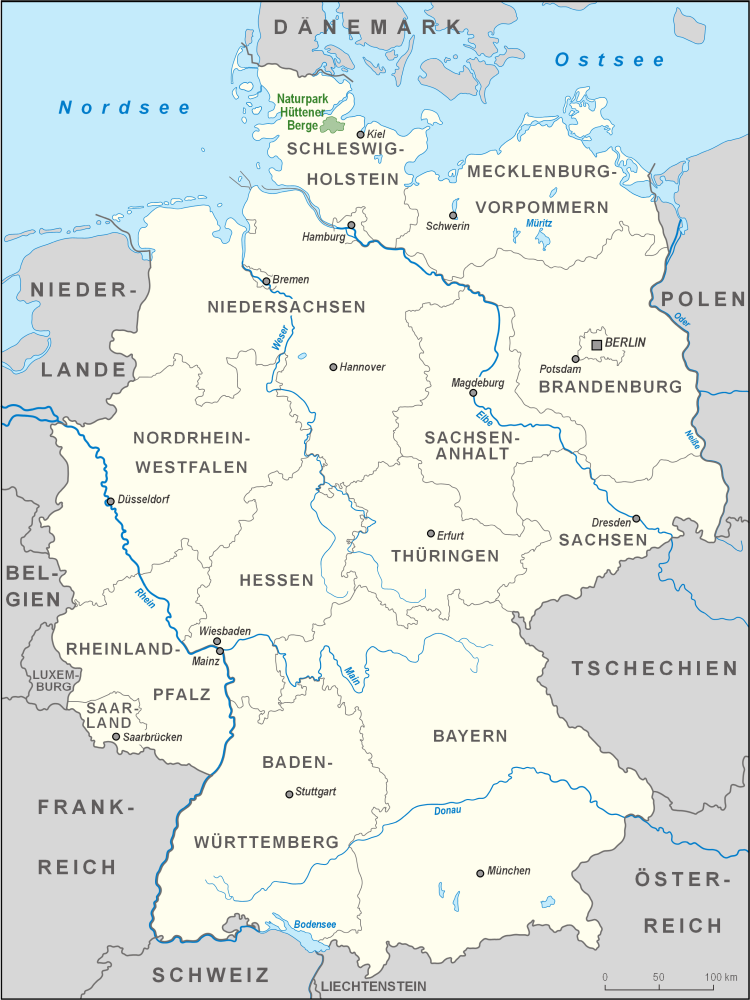
Location of the Hütten Hills Nature Park

The Hütten Hills (German: Hüttener Berge, Danish: Hytten Bjerge) are an area of upland, up to 105.8 m above sea level (NHN), roughly west of the town of Eckernförde in the county of Rendsburg-Eckernförde in the North German state of Schleswig-Holstein. They lie within the Hütten Hills Nature Park.

== Geography ==
=== Location ===
The Hütten Hills − part of the Schleswig-Holstein Uplands − lie roughly between Fleckeby to the north, Ascheffel to the east, Alt and Neu Duvenstedt to the south and Brekendorf to the west. Their neighbouring landscapes are the large Schleswig Geest to the west, Schwansen to the northeast and the Danish Wahld to the east.

=== Hütten Hills Nature Park ===
The boundaries of the nature park (NSG No. 33392), which was established in 1971 and covers an area of about 219 km^{2}, extends far beyond that of the Hütten Hills to the west and almost reaches the Bay of Eckernförde in the east. To the north is the Schlei Nature Park and to the south – on the other side of the Kiel Canal – is the Westensee Nature Park.

The nature park covers the following municipalities (most of which belong to the Amt of Hüttener Berge): Ahlefeld, Alt Duvenstedt, Ascheffel, Bistensee, Borgstedt, Brekendorf, Bünsdorf, Damendorf, Groß Wittensee, Haby, Holtsee, Holzbunge, Hütten, Klein Wittensee, Neu Duvenstedt, Osterby, Owschlag and Sehestedt.

The lakes of the nature park are the: Bistensee, Fresensee, Heidteich, Owschlager See and Wittensee. Its rivers and streams include the: Alte Eider, Hüttener Au, Mühlenbach, Osterbek, Sorge und Schirnau.

The Nature Park Way links five nature parks in Schleswig-Holstein.

=== Hills and landscape ===
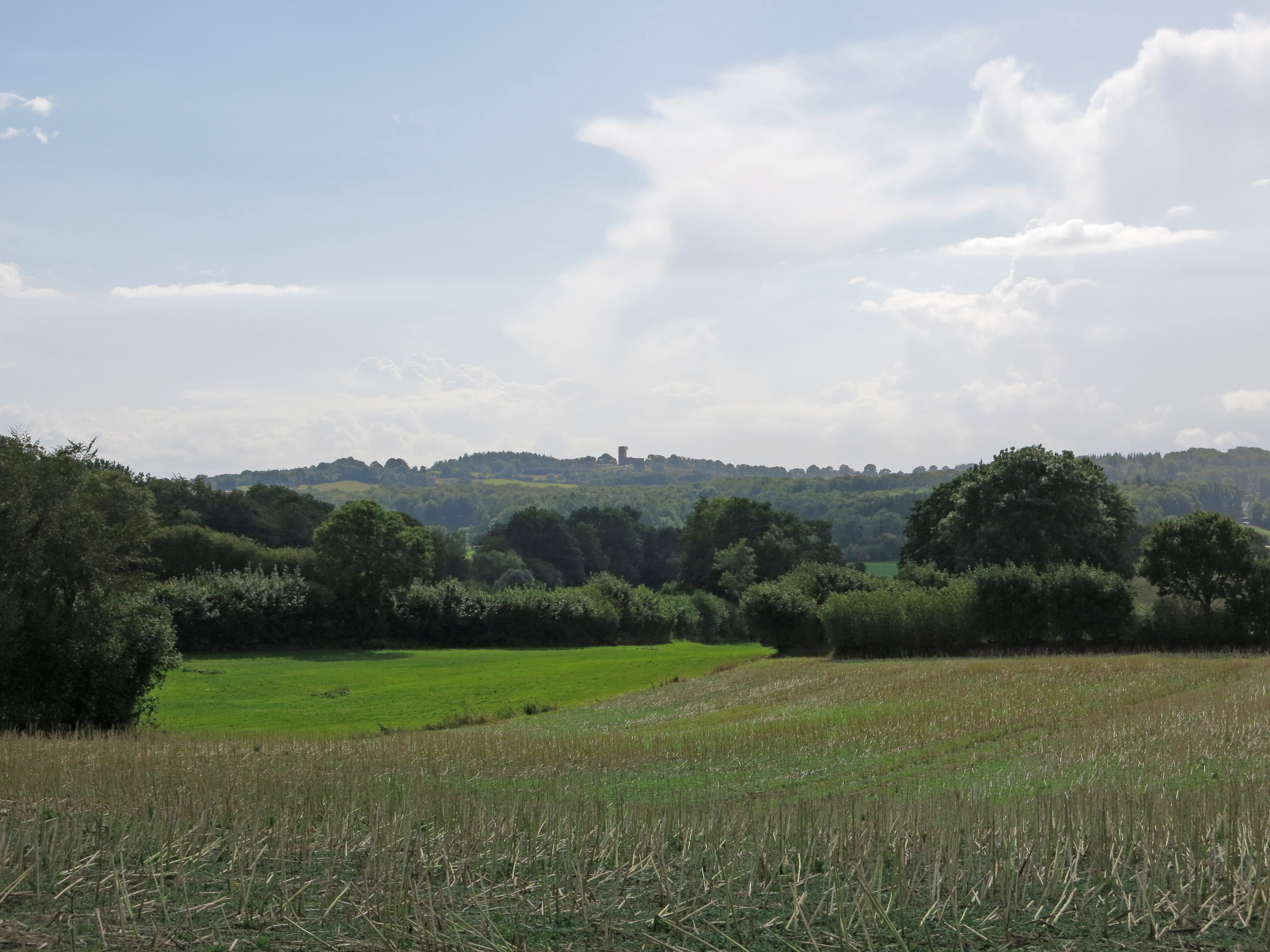
The Aschberg

The highest point of the Hütten Hills is the Scheelsberg near Ascheffel. On the nearby Aschberg stands a Bismarck statue and on the dome of the Heidberg (Heideberg), which is popular with hikers, lies a glacial erratic. From the hills may be seen inter alia the Bay of Eckernförde and the Schlei.

Amongst the hills in the Hütten range are the following – with their heights in metres (m) above sea level (NHN):

- Scheelsberg (105.8 m), west of Ascheffel
- eine Erhebung (105.1 m), northwest of Ascheffel
- Aschberg (97.7 m), south of Ascheffel
- Heidberg (also called the Heideberg; 99.1 m), west-southwest of Ascheffel
- Brekenberg (90.0 m), northeast of Brekendorf
- Immenberg (82.0 m), east-southeast of Brekendorf
- Arnsberg (80.1 m), east of Brekendorf
- Tütenberg (74.6 m), southwest of Hummelfeld-Fellhorst

The Hütten Hills are the northernmost hill range with elevations over 100 metres in Germany. They are, however, lower than the highest points of Holstein Switzerland (highest point: the Bungsberg, 167.4 m) between Kiel and Lübeck.

== Climate ==
A feature of the Hütten Hills is its very variable microclimate. Whilst the western side near Owschlag has averaged annual temperatures of 9.3 °C (1997–2005), the village of Ascheffel on the eastern side has an average temperature of 9.8 °C. This is due to the gently elevated and relatively sheltered location of this settlement. In addition on the western side of the hills the average annual precipitation is around 930 mm (L/m^{2}) which is much higher than in the east, where it is only 660 mm.

== See also ==
- List of nature parks in Germany
