= Hütten (Amt) =

Coordinates: 54.433°N 9.700°E

- Former amt
- Flag Coat of arms

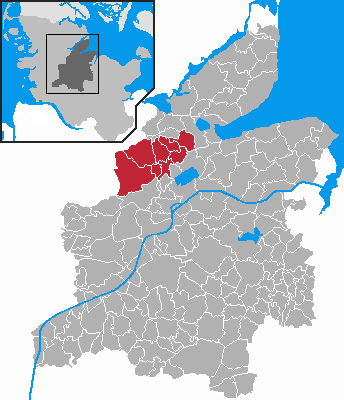
- Map of Rendsburg-Eckernförde highlighting Hütten
- Country: Germany
- State: Schleswig-Holstein
- District: Rendsburg-Eckernförde
- Disestablished: 2008-01-01
- Region seat: Ascheffel

Area
  - Total: 100 km^{2} (39 sq mi)

Hütten was an Amt ("collective municipality") in the district of Rendsburg-Eckernförde, in Schleswig-Holstein, Germany. The seat of the Amt was in Ascheffel. In January 2008, it was merged with the Amt Wittensee to form the Amt of Hüttener Berge.

== Municipalities ==
The Amt of Hütten consisted of the following municipalities:

1. Ahlefeld
2. Ascheffel
3. Bistensee
4. Brekendorf
5. Damendorf
6. Hütten
7. Osterby
8. Owschlag
