= Wittensee =

Coordinates: 54°24′N 9°46′E

- Former Amt
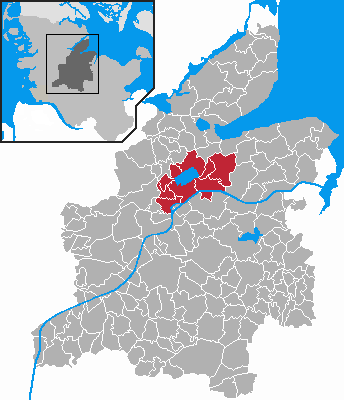
- Map of Rendsburg-Eckernförde highlighting Hüttener Berge
- Country: Germany
- State: Schleswig-Holstein
- District: Rendsburg-Eckernförde
- Disestablished: 2008-01-01
- Region seat: Groß Wittensee

Area
  - Total: 100 km^{2} (39 sq mi)

Wittensee was an Amt ("collective municipality") in the district of Rendsburg-Eckernförde, in Schleswig-Holstein, Germany. It was named after the lake Wittensee, which is situated in the Amt. It was located between Eckernförde and Rendsburg. The village Groß Wittensee was the seat of the Amt.

In January 2008, it was merged with the Amt Wittensee to form the Amt Hüttener Berge.

The Amt Wittensee consisted of the following municipalities:

1. Borgstedt
2. Bünsdorf
3. Groß Wittensee
4. Haby
5. Holtsee
6. Holzbunge
7. Klein Wittensee
8. Neu Duvenstedt
9. Sehestedt
