= List of hills of Schleswig-Holstein =

This list of hills in Schleswig-Holstein shows a selection of well-known hills in the German federal state of Schleswig-Holstein (in order of height):

Name, Height in metres above NN, Location (District/Region/Town/village)

1. Bungsberg (168 m), Ostholstein district, northwest of Schönwalde
2. Strezerberg (130 m), Plön district, near Giekau
3. Pilsberg (128 m), Plön district, near Panker
4. Voßberg (128 m), Plön district, near Kirchnüchel
5. Sternberg (118 m), Plön district, near Altharmhorst, village of Kirchnüchel
6. Scheelsberg (106 m), Rendsburg-Eckernförde district, west of Ascheffel, Hütten Hills
7. Kleiner Hahnheider Berg (100 m), Stormarn district, Hahnheide
8. Weiberberg (100 m), Ostholstein district, near Harmsdorf
9. Großer Hahnheider Berg (99 m), Stormarn district, Hahnheide
10. Aschberg (98 m), Rendsburg-Eckernförde district, near Ascheffel, Hütten Hills
11. Kieler Berg (94m), Rendsburg-Eckernförde district, near Westensee
12. Gömnitzer Berg (94 m), Ostholstein district, near Neustadt
13. Haferberg (94 m), Herzogtum Lauenburg district, near Geesthacht
14. Heidberg (92 m), Rendsburg-Eckernförde district, near Ascheffel, Hütten Hills
15. Segeberger Kalkberg (91 m), Segeberg district, in Bad Segeberg
16. Rathkrügen (89 m), Segeberg district, near Kisdorf
17. Hoheneichen (89 m), Plön district, near Rastorfer Kreuz
18. Mühlenberg (88 m), Ostholstein district, near Bosau
19. Tüteberg (88 m), Rendsburg-Eckernförde district, near Westensee
20. Nehms-Berg (87.1 m), Segeberg district, between Bad Segeberg and Plön
21. "Itzespitze" (83.4 m), Steinburg district, near Hennstedt (Steinburg)
22. Grimmelsberg (83 m), Segeberg district, near Tarbek
23. Mühlenberg (81 m), Herzogtum Lauenburg district, near Niendorf/ Stecknitz
24. Albsfelder Berg (80 m), Herzogtum Lauenburg district, near Albsfelde
25. Dellenberg (79.5 m), Steinburg district, near Hennstedt (Steinburg)
26. Stilker-Berg (79.3 m), Steinburg district, near Hennstedt (Steinburg)
27. Lüneburger Berg (79 m), Herzogtum Lauenburg district, near Kittlitz
28. Karghöde (78.81 m), Dithmarschen district, village of Schrum
29. Heiliger Berg (78.1 m), Rendsburg-Eckernförde district, near Blumenthal
30. Klingberg (78 m), Stormarn district, near Travenbrück, OT Neverstaven
31. Boxberg (77 m), Rendsburg-Eckernförde district, near Homfeld
32. Hohe Buch hills (76 m), Herzogtum Lauenburg district, near Groß Disnack
33. Bei Rönnerheide (74.1 m), highest hill in Kiel, in the village of Rönne Kiel
34. Segrahner Berg (73 m), Herzogtum Lauenburg district, near Gudow
35. Ketelvierth (73m), Segeberg district near Großenaspe
36. Pariner Berg (72 m), Ostholstein district, near Bad Schwartau
37. Scheersberg (70 m), Schleswig-Flensburg district, near Quern
38. Rolling hills of the Münsterdorf Geest Island (up to 70 m), Steinburg district, south of the Stör
39. Schüberg (63 m), Stormarn district, Ammersbek OT Hoisbüttel
40. Hamberg (65 m), Dithmarschen district, near Burg
41. Glasberg (63.8 m), Steinburg district, north of Sarlhusen
42. Bocksberg (63 m), Stormarn district, near Ahrensburg
43. Reselithberg (63 m), Steinburg district, near Wacken
44. Pinneberg on the island of Helgoland (61 m), Pinneberg district
45. Klingeberg (59 m), Stormarn district, near Reinbek
46. Lundtop (54 m), Kreis Schleswig-Flensburg, near Osterby
47. Sandesberg, Nordfriesland district (53.3 m), in Ostenfeld
48. Jarschenberg, Rendsburg-Eckernförde district (52.0 m), near Jahrsdorf
49. Uwe-Düne on the island of Sylt (50.2 m), Nordfriesland district
50. Brautberg, (49.1 m), Rendsburg-Eckernförde district, north of Bordesholm
51. Lands-Berg (48.6 m), Rendsburg-Eckernförde district, near Homfeld
52. Rantzauhöhe (44.8 m), Nordfriesland district, near Stadum
53. Kuh-Berg (43.8 m), Steinburg district, near Sarlhusen
54. Stollberg (43.4 m), Nordfriesland district
55. Bunsberg (34 m), Stormarn district, near Ammersbek
56. Hinrichsberg (27.2 m) highest hill on the island of Fehmarn, Ostholstein district
57. Wulfener Berg (26.5 m), second highest hill auf Fehmarn, Ostholstein district
58. Holmer Sandberge (23 m), Pinneberg district, near Holm

== See also ==
- List of the highest mountains in Germany
- List of the highest mountains in the German states
- List of mountain and hill ranges in Germany
