= Bauernheinrich =

German card game

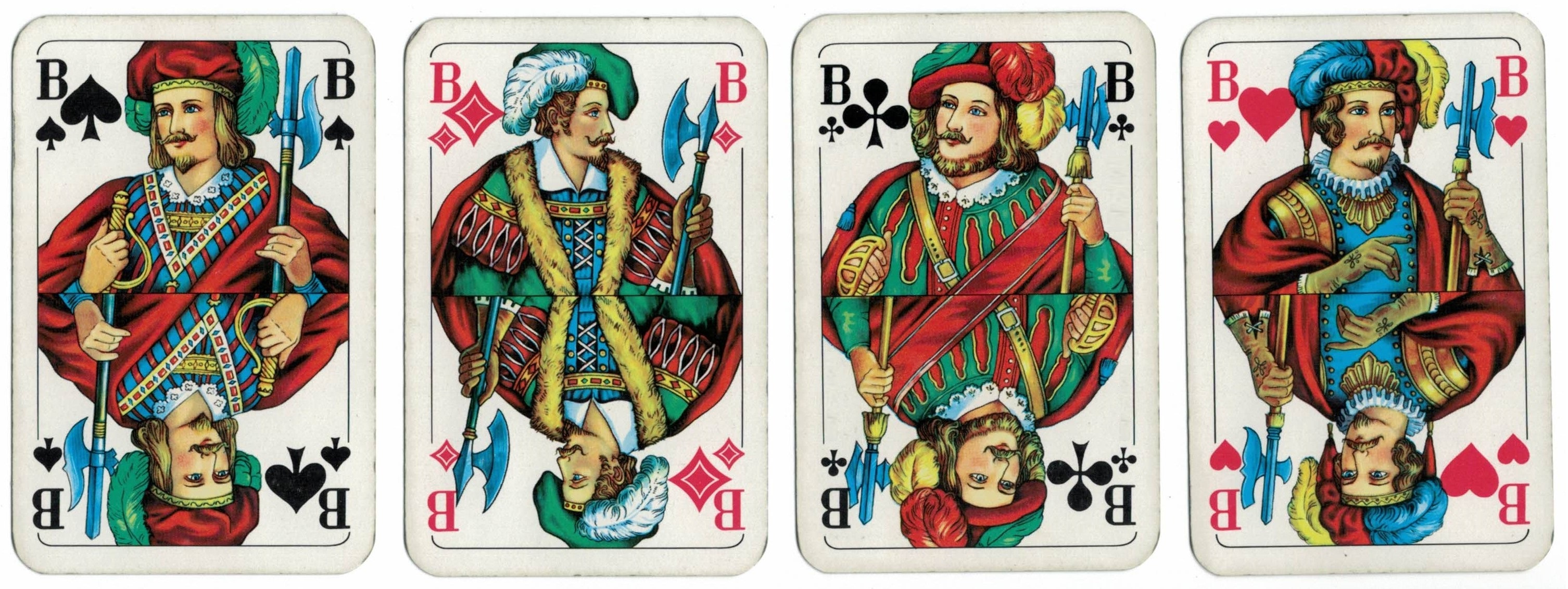
- The 4 highest trumps
- Origin: Schleswig-Holstein, Germany
- Type: Shedding / Beating
- Players: 4
- Cards: 32
- Deck: Skat pack
- Rank (high→low): ♣J ♠J ♥J ♦J; TA TK TQ T10-7; A K Q 10-7 (led suit)
- Play: Clockwise

Related games
- Calypso • Dudák • Hund • Svoi Kozyri
- Features: each player has own trump suit; 8-card hands

Bauernheinrich ("Farmer Henry") is a card game for four players that is played in the region of Anglia in the north German state of Schleswig-Holstein. It is played with a normal Skat pack. The winner is the one to 'go out' first. An unusual feature of this game is that each player has their own trump suit and so can trump others with it; a feature shared with the Czech game, Dudák, and the Russian game, Svoi Kozyri. It is a member of the 'beating game' family.

== History ==
The origin of the game is unknown, however, in 1913, Heinrich is mentioned as one of the social card games played at home or in the pub in the region of Schleswig alongside Neunkart, Scharwenzel and Bur.

Otto Mensing records it in 1929 as a four-player Anglian game under the names Heinrich, Buurn-Heinerich, Buurnhinnerk and Buernhinnerk. The game is named after its highest card, the ♣J.

In the West Münsterland dialect, a form of plattdeutsch related to that spoken in Holstein, Buurnhennick is also a nickname for an unmarried uncle living with the family.

Mensing states that the game was probably the same as the one called Buuren or Best Buuren, a folk game in which, however, the ♠J was the highest card. It should not, however, be confused with Bester Bube in which only five cards are dealt and the rules of play are quite different.

Today the game is common on the Anglian peninsula and in the Hütten Hills (Holzbunge) in the region of Schleswig.

== Cards ==
The cards rank as follows (highest first): Ace (Ass), King (König), Queen (Dame), 10, 9, 8, 7 The Jacks (Bauern or Buben) have a special role as permanent trumps and rank above all the other cards. The ranking of the Jacks, highest first, is: Clubs (Kreuz), Spades (Pik), Hearts (Herz) and Diamonds (Karo). If a German-suited pack is used the Obers play the role of Queens and the Unters the role of Jacks. The ranking of suits is then: Acorns, Leaves, Hearts and Bells. One of the nicknames for a Jack in German is Bauer, which also means "farmer", hence the name of the game means something like "Farmer Henry".

== Aim ==
Bauernheinrich is a shedding game; the aim is to be the first to get rid of one's cards.

== Rules ==
The following rules are based on those by Spielregeln.

=== Preparation ===
The cards are shuffled and dealt to all four players in anticlockwise order in packets of 3, 2 and 3 respectively, so that everyone ends up with a hand of 8 cards. They are kept concealed from the other players. Next, trumps are determined. The player with the Ace of Clubs announces e.g. "I have Clubs!" ("Hier ist Kreuz!"), whereupon that player has Clubs as a personal trump suit. In clockwise order the other players have Spades, Hearts and Diamonds as their trump suits, regardless of the cards they actually hold.

=== Playing ===
Normal game
Permanent trumps (highest to lowest)
♣J|♠J|♥J|♦J
Suit cards (highest to lowest)
Clubs	Spades	Hearts	Diamonds
♣A|♣K|♣Q|♣10|♣9	♠A|♠K|♠Q|♠10|♠9	♥A|♥K|♥Q|♥10|♥9	♦A|♦K|♦Q|♦10|♦9

The player with the Ace of Clubs leads by playing any card to the table. Play is clockwise. The next player must if possible: (Note: Suit need not be followed, but players must beat, i.e. play a higher card of the led suit or trump, if they can; otherwise they must pick up.)

- Follow suit with a higher card or...
- trump (in this case with a Spade or any Jack) or, if a Spade was led, overtrump.

If unable to follow suit or trump, the player must pick up the trick whether complete or not (in this card it is a single card), and add it to the hand cards.

Once a trick is taken, it is the next player's turn to lead to the next trick. If a second card is played, it is the turn of the third player (whose trump suit is Hearts) to play to the trick. The previously played card must always be followed or trumped; otherwise the whole trick must be taken i.e. up to three cards. A player who cannot follow suit or trump, must pick up.

The maximum number of cards played to a trick equals the number of players. So the player who plays the fourth card to a trick must either:

- Pick up the trick if unable to head it or
- remove the four cards (the whole trick) from play having beaten the last card.

That player then leads a card to the next trick.

=== Winning ===
The first player to get rid of all cards has won. The others continue, now playing tricks with a maximum of 3 cards, i.e. a new trick started after the third card of the previous one. Finally, the last two players play for two cards per trick.

If a trick is started with four players and during the trick a player goes out, the trick is still played to the end with four cards. Only in the next trick does the number of cards played reduce to three. The same applies when the next player goes out.

The game is played until the last two players have finished in third and fourth place. The cards have no point value, and the remaining cards are not counted towards the last player. So there are no tournaments in which an overall winner is determined from a large number of games.

== Tactics ==
- At the beginning of the game
  - Get rid of cards not of great value such as low cards in other players' trump suits
  - Collect trumps when you don't have to, in order to have a better hand for the rest of the game
- High cards in the trump suit of an earlier player may be useful if you have to follow suit to that player's trump card
- Jacks are of great value since they cannot be beaten even by one's own trumps. They can be played in a targeted way to force others to pick up their cards and keep them in the game
- The same is true of high trumps of a following player which you can force him to pick up. But this may also be an advantage to the person opposite who can then lead

== Sources ==
- Arnold, Peter (1995). The Book of Card Games. Barnes & Noble, USA.
- Hoeck, Johannes (1913). "Stutenspielen" in Die Heimat. pp. 45 ff.
- Mensing, Otto, ed. (1927). Schleswig-Holsteinisches Wörterbuch: A bis E (in German). Vol. 1. Neumünster: Wachholtz Verlag. OCLC 163382416. Wikidata Q131604020.
- Mensing, Otto, ed. (1929). Schleswig-Holsteinisches Wörterbuch: F bis J (in German). Vol. 2. Neumünster: Wachholtz Verlag. OCLC 163382434. Wikidata Q131604049.
