= Osterby, Rendsburg-Eckernförde =

Osterby Østerby
- Municipality
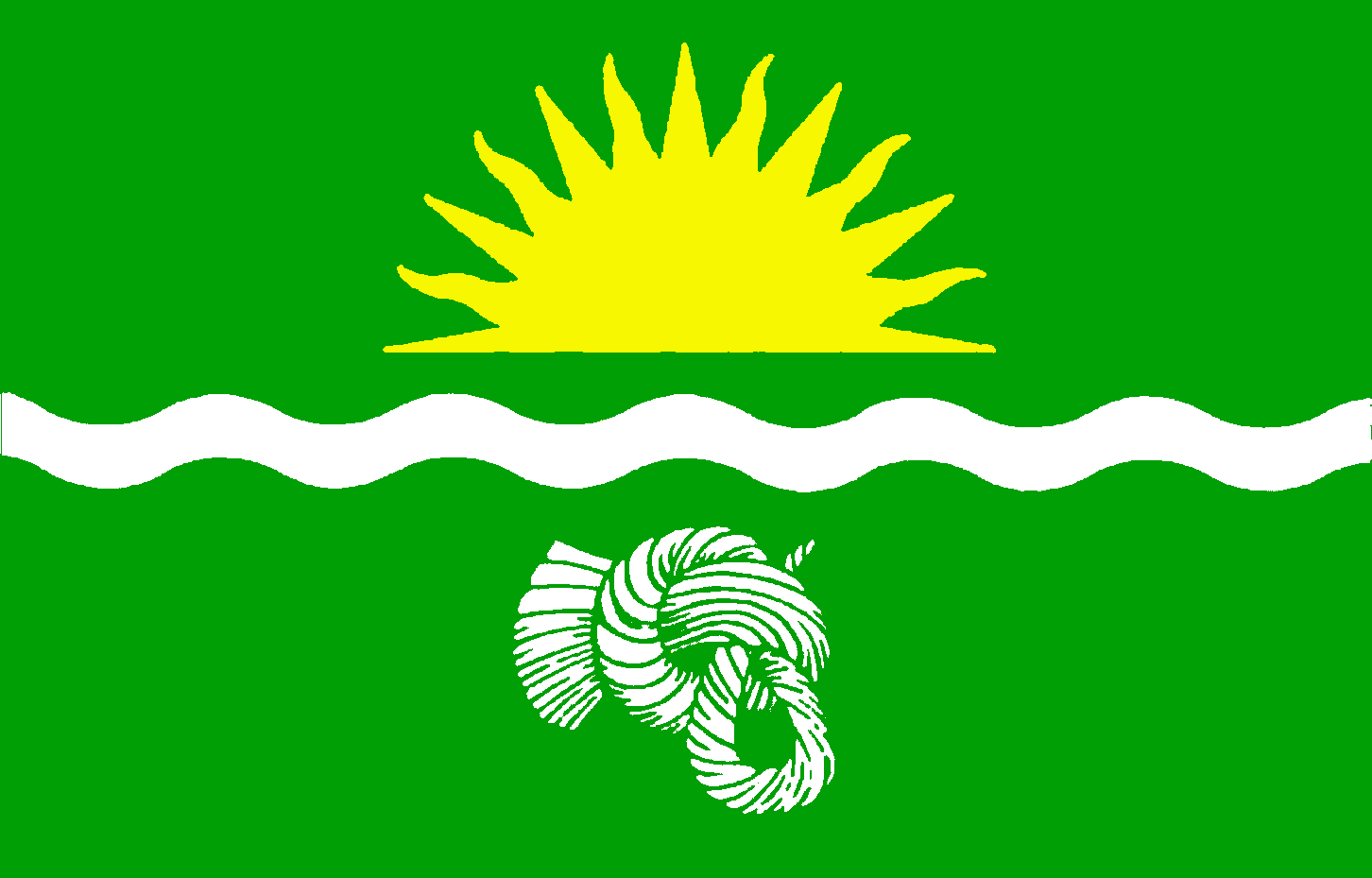
- Flag Coat of arms

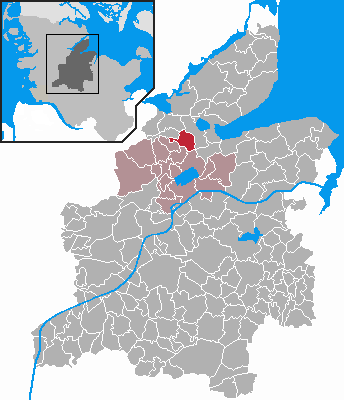
- Location of Osterby; Østerby within Rendsburg-Eckernförde district
- Interactive map of Osterby; Østerby
- Location within Germany Location within Schleswig-Holstein
- Coordinates: 54°27′N 9°45′E
- Country: Germany
- State: Schleswig-Holstein
- District: Rendsburg-Eckernförde
- Municipal assoc.: Hüttener Berge

Government
  - Mayor: Robert Ott (CDU)

Area
  - Total: 9.84 km^{2} (3.80 sq mi)
- Elevation: 18 m (59 ft)

Population (2025-12-31)
  - Total: 977
  - Density: 99.3/km^{2} (257/sq mi)
- Time zone: UTC+01:00 (CET)
  - Summer (DST): UTC+02:00 (CEST)
- Postal codes: 24367
- Dialling codes: 04351, 04353
- Vehicle registration: RD
- Website: www.osterby.de

Osterby (Danish: Østerby) is a municipality in the district of Rendsburg-Eckernförde, in Schleswig-Holstein, Germany. It is mostly rural.

== Location and transport ==
Osterby is located on the Osterbek stream, about 6 kilometres (3.7 mi) west of Eckernförde in the Hüttener Berge hills, south of Hummelfeld, Fleckeby and Windeby and north of Hütten, Damendorf and Groß Wittensee. Bundesstraße 203 from Rendsburg to Eckernförde passes to the southeast and Bundesstraße 76 from Eckernförde to Schleswig to the north.

== History ==
The first recorded mention of Osterby is on 7 October 1528 as Osterbuj. It was a Jutish settlement (Danish by) on the eastern edge of a forest that lay between the Eider and the Schlei. In the Middle Ages, the forest and bog land between the two rivers formed a natural barrier between the Danes and the Saxons, until the Saxons advancing from the south mixed with the Jutes around 1550. From an early period, the inhabitants of Osterby cleared forest and bog land to add to their holdings, as shown by old farm names such as Holzkoppel, Haselhorst, Moorwiese and Wolfsbrook.

The village was hotly contested in the First Schleswig War in 1848, commemorated in a stone erected to mark the 50th anniversary in 1898, which bears the inscription Up ewig ungedeelt.

Until 1950, Osterby was an entirely agricultural village, with craftsmen and shops serving the residents. In the last 25 years it has added some new residential development and become a bedroom community for Eckernförde.

== Governance ==
There are 11 seats on the council; since the 2013 election, five have been held by the CDU and three each by the SPD and the KWG Free Voters association.

=== Coat of arms ===
The blazon on the coat of arms of Osterby includes a silver bar of waves representing the Osterbek, with a golden sun above it and a Suebian knot in silver beneath, representing Osterby Man, a bog body skull found southeast of the village in 1948.

== Commerce and education ==
Osterby has several farms, an inn and a shop. There are two kindergartens. Further schooling and other businesses are located in Eckernförde.
