= Hüttener Berge =

Hüttener Berge may refer to:

- Hütten Hills, a hill range and nature park in Schleswig-Holstein, Germany, known as the Hüttener Berge in German
- Hüttener Berge (Amt), a collective municipality in Schleswig-Holstein, Germany
