= Hütten =

Hütten may refer to:

- Hütten, Rhineland-Palatinate, a municipality in Rhineland-Palatinate, Germany
- Hütten, Schleswig-Holstein, a municipality in Schleswig-Holstein, Germany
- Hütten, Switzerland, a municipality in the canton of Zürich
- Hütten (Amt), a former collective municipality in Schleswig-Holstein, Germany

== See also ==
- Hutten (disambiguation)
