= Götaälv =

Götaälv may refer to:

- Bungsberg, a ship that was renamed Götaälv in 1939
- Deneb, a ship that was renamed Götaälv in 1937
