= Joachim Rittstieg =

German mathematics teacher

Joachim Rittstieg (23 February 1937, in Berlin – 27 May 2014, in Rendsburg) was a secondary school mathematics teacher who had travelled in Mexico, Guatemala, Belize, Honduras and El Salvador, and had studied the Mayan calendar system as a 40-year hobby.

== Biography ==
Rittstieg began learning a Low German dialect during World War II at the age of six, when his family returned to the Angeln region of Schleswig-Holstein. Most historians identify Angeln as the homeland of the Angles who settled England in the post-Roman period, but Rittstieg declares his Angeliter Platt dialect to be closely related to Old Norse.

By 1959 he had become a maths teacher and sports coach. After learning Spanish, he went to the Deutsche Schule of San Salvador for six years, where he learned Quiché and became interested in Mayan chronology.

In 1975 he read historian Nigel Davies's book The Aztecs and learned about the Aztec city of Aztlán. The following year he met three Maya priests, with whom he conversed in Zuyua Than; he made the outlandish, unsupported claim that this non-Indo-European Mayan language is somehow similar to his native Low German dialect.

In 2000 Rittstieg published his book ABC der Maya, which details many of his extraordinary claims.

After reading a German translation of the Poetic Edda, he came upon the original Old Norse version on the Internet, which he said he could understand 70 percent of because of its similarity to his Angeliter Platt dialect.

== Rittstieg's claims ==
Following in the footsteps of Ignatius L. Donnelly, a 19th-century promoter of pseudoscience and pseudohistory, Rittstieg identified Aztlán with the mythical Atlantis.

He claimed that the Dresden Codex points to an 8-tonne cache of 2,156 golden tablets contained in a stone chest, which he believed sank into Lake Izabal, Guatemala as a result of an earthquake that, he declared, coincided with a solar eclipse occurring on 14 September 1224. He declared that discovering the supposed lost tablets would at least equal in significance Heinrich Schliemann's rediscovery of Troy and Howard Carter's discovery of the tomb of Tutankhamun.

Rittstieg also postulated an imagined 470-year contract between Vikings and Mesoamericans, who supposedly killed the Vikings after blaming them for the destruction of the Toltec capital Tollan.

Until his death Rittstieg lived in Borgstedt, in Schleswig-Holstein, Germany.

== The Bild expedition ==
After many years of unsuccessfully seeking sponsors for an attempt to recover the archaeological treasure he believed to be at the bottom of Lake Izabal, by February 2011 Joachim Rittstieg had persuaded the Bild newspaper to mount an expedition.

Accompanying him were reporter Tim Thorer, who previously covered the eruption of the Icelandic volcano Eyjafjallajökull and had interviewed former Palermo mayor and determined Mafia opponent Leoluca Orlando; reporter Jürgen Helfricht, who previously took part in South African and Zambian expeditions; photographer Holm Röhner, who previously travelled to the Israeli-occupied Palestinian territories, Russia and Bulgaria; videographer Claas Weinmann, who covered the largely peaceful 2011 Egyptian revolution from Cairo; and diving instructor Steffen Haufe, who has conducted previous underwater expeditions exploring shipwrecks.

The expedition ended up finding nothing but a pot located on the northern shore of Lake Izabal.
