= Hutten =

Hutten and von Hutten may refer to:

- Alexandrine von Hutten-Czapska (1854–1941), Polish novelist
- Bettina Riddle von Hutten (1874–1957), American-born novelist
- Christoph Franz von Hutten (1673–1729), Bishop of Würzburg
- Emeryk Hutten-Czapski (1828–1896), Polish Count
- Philipp von Hutten (1505–1546), German conquistador
- Ulrich von Hutten (1488–1523), German humanist
- Lars Hutten (born 1990), Dutch soccer player

== See also ==
- Hütten (disambiguation)
