= Klein Wittensee =

- Municipality
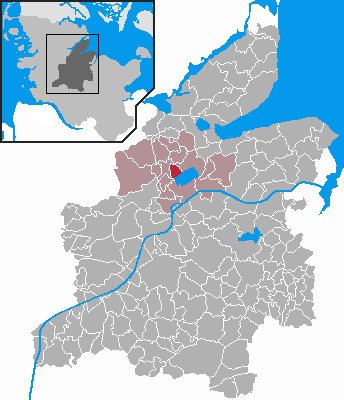
- Location of Klein Wittensee within Rendsburg-Eckernförde district
- Interactive map of Klein Wittensee
- Location within Germany Location within Schleswig-Holstein
- Coordinates: 54°22′N 9°43′E
- Country: Germany
- State: Schleswig-Holstein
- District: Rendsburg-Eckernförde
- Municipal assoc.: Hüttener Berge

Government
  - Mayor: Hans Claus Schnack

Area
  - Total: 4.31 km^{2} (1.66 sq mi)
- Elevation: 12 m (39 ft)

Population (2025-12-31)
  - Total: 226
  - Density: 52.4/km^{2} (136/sq mi)
- Time zone: UTC+01:00 (CET)
  - Summer (DST): UTC+02:00 (CEST)
- Postal codes: 24361
- Dialling codes: 04356
- Vehicle registration: RD
- Website: www.amt-huettener- berge.de

Klein Wittensee is a municipality in the district of Rendsburg-Eckernförde, in Schleswig-Holstein, Germany.

Klein Wittensee is south of the municipality of Groß Wittensee, and north of Bünsdorf.
