= Naturparkweg =

Nature trail in Schleswig-Holstein, Germany

Coordinates: 51.1190°N 6.1931°E

The Naturparkweg is a nature trail which links the five nature parks in the German state of Schleswig-Holstein. It runs from Eckernförde via Aschberg, Sehestedt, Westensee, Brammer, Aukrug, Brokstedt, Wiemersdorf, Fehrenbötel, Blunk, Bad Segeberg, Bad Oldesloe to the Lauenburg Lakes.

The trail is marked by a yellow arrow with a green border. Its total length is 117 km (73 mi).
