= Bungsberg (ship) =

German cargo ship sunk near Tallinn, Estonia

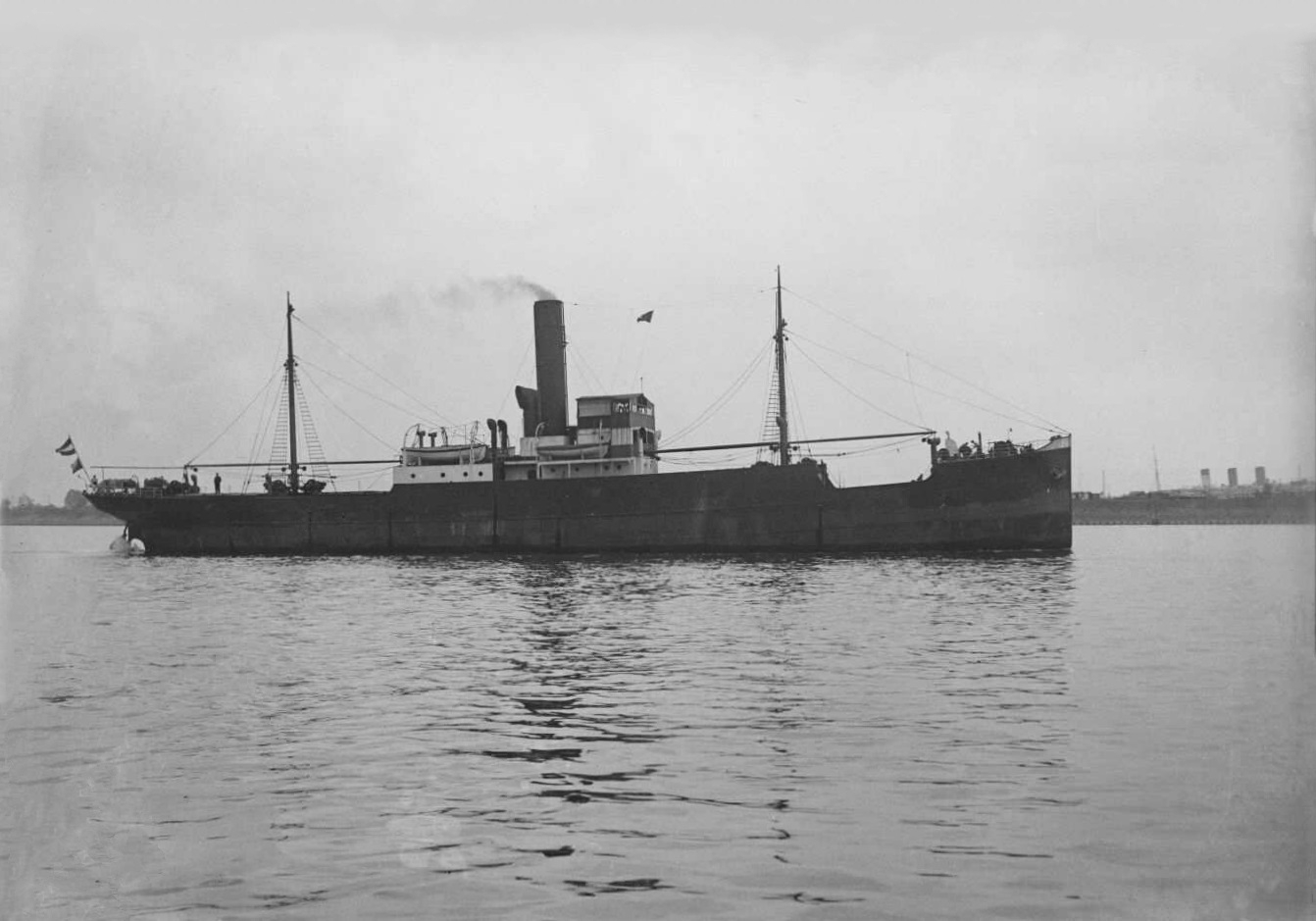
- The ship as Eva, before 1935

History

Germany
- Name: 1924: Eva; 1939: Götaälv; 1939: Bungsberg
- Namesake: 1939: Bungsberg
- Owner: 1924: China Reederei; 1938: A Bolten W Miller’s Nachf
- Operator: by 1930: Jebsen & Jessen; 1931: A Bolten W Miller’s Nachf
- Port of registry: Hamburg
- Builder: Howaldtswerke, Kiel
- Yard number: 646
- Launched: 28 August 1924
- Completed: 1924
- Identification: 1924: code letters RFHP; by 1934: call sign DHHB
- Fate: mined, 1943

General characteristics
- Type: cargo ship
- Tonnage: 1,504 GRT, 851 NRT
- Length: 250.8 ft (76.4 m)
- Beam: 38.5 ft (11.7 m)
- Depth: 15.9 ft (4.8 m)
- Decks: 1
- Installed power: 1 × triple-expansion engine; 143 NHP
- Propulsion: 1 × screw
- Sensors & processing systems: submarine signalling
- Notes: sister ships: Troja, Kreta, Syra

Bungsberg was a cargo steamship. She was built in 1924 in Germany in 1924 as Eva. In 1939 she was renamed twice: firstly as Götaälv, and then as Bungsberg. A mine sank her off the coast of Estonia in 1943. Her wreck is now a site for wreck diving.

== Building and registration ==
In 1922 and 1923, Howaldtswerke in Kiel built three sister ships for Deutsche Levante-Linie. Yard number 643 was built in 1922 as Troja; yard number 644 was built in 1923 as Kreta; and yard number 645 was built in 1923 as Syra. Hamburg America Line owned Troja and Syra; and Bremer Dampfer Linie „Atlas“ owned Kreta; but Deutsche Levante-Linie managed all three.

Also in 1924, Howaldtswerke built a fourth ship, to the same design, but for China Reederei. She was built as yard number 646, and launched as Eva. Her length was 250.8 ft (76.4 m); her beam was 38.5 ft (11.7 m); and her depth was 15.9 ft (4.8 m). Her tonnages were 1,504 GRT and 851 NRT. She had a single screw; driven by a three-cylinder triple-expansion engine that was rated at 143 NHP. She was equipped with submarine signalling. She was registered in Hamburg. Her code letters were RFHP.

== Career ==
By 1930, Jebsen & Jessen were Eva's managers, but by 1931, August Bolten William Miller’s Nachfolger had succeeded them. By 1934, her wireless telegraph call sign was DHHB, and this had superseded her code letters. By 1938, August Bolten William Miller’s Nachfolger owned Eva as well as managing her. In 1939 she was renamed Götaälv, but later that year she was renamed Bungsberg, after Bungsberg, a hill that is the highest point in Holstein.

== Loss and wreck ==
On 24 March 1943, Bungsberg struck one of a set of mines that had been laid across the Suurupi Strait. She sank off Naissaar, at position 59°30′N 24°36′E. Her wreck lies on an even keel, at a depth of 38 metres (125 ft). The captain of a fishing trawler discovered the wreck in 1984, and told the Estonian Maritime Museum in Tallinn. The Museum fixed the position of the wreck on 15 June 1988, during a sonar testing operation by the Estonian Geology Administration. The Museum identified the wreck in 1992. On 2 July 2011 the wreck was added to the Estonian National Register of Cultural Monuments.

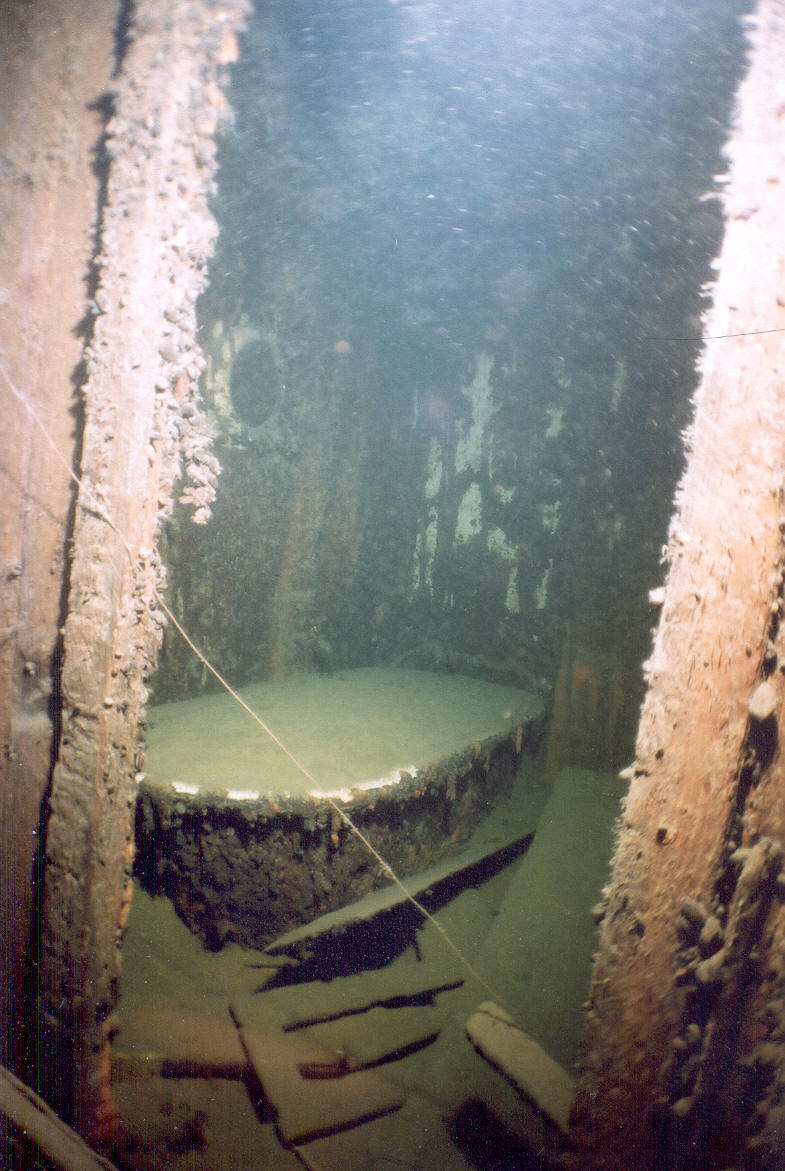
A bathroom in Bungsberg's wreck, on the starboard side, of the superstructure, just below the bridge

The engine order telegraph and some papers were salvaged from the wreck, and are kept at the Estonian Maritime Museum. Her funnel, mizzen mast, and the upper part of her bridge are missing. Damage from the mine explosion is clearly visible on her starboard bow. All four of her cargo holds are empty. recreational divers now visit the wreck.

== Bibliography ==
- Lloyd's Register of Shipping. Vol. II.–Steamers and Motorships. London: Lloyd's Register of Shipping. 1924 – via Internet Archive.
- Lloyd's Register of Shipping. Vol. II.–Steamers and Motorships. London: Lloyd's Register of Shipping. 1926 – via Internet Archive.
- Lloyd's Register of Shipping. Vol. II.–Steamers and Motorships of 300 tons gross and over. London: Lloyd's Register of Shipping. 1930 – via Southampton City Council.
- Lloyd's Register of Shipping. Vol. II.–Steamers and Motorships of 300 tons gross and over. London: Lloyd's Register of Shipping. 1931 – via Southampton City Council.
- Lloyd's Register of Shipping. Vol. II.–Steamers and Motorships of 300 tons gross and over. London: Lloyd's Register of Shipping. 1934 – via Southampton City Council.
- Lloyd's Register of Shipping. Vol. II.–Steamers and Motorships of 300 tons gross and over. London: Lloyd's Register of Shipping. 1938 – via Southampton City Council.
- Lloyd's Register of Shipping. Vol. II.–Steamers and Motorships of 300 tons. Trawlers, tugs, dredgers, etc. London: Lloyd's Register of Shipping. 1939 – via Southampton City Council.
