= Hund (card game) =

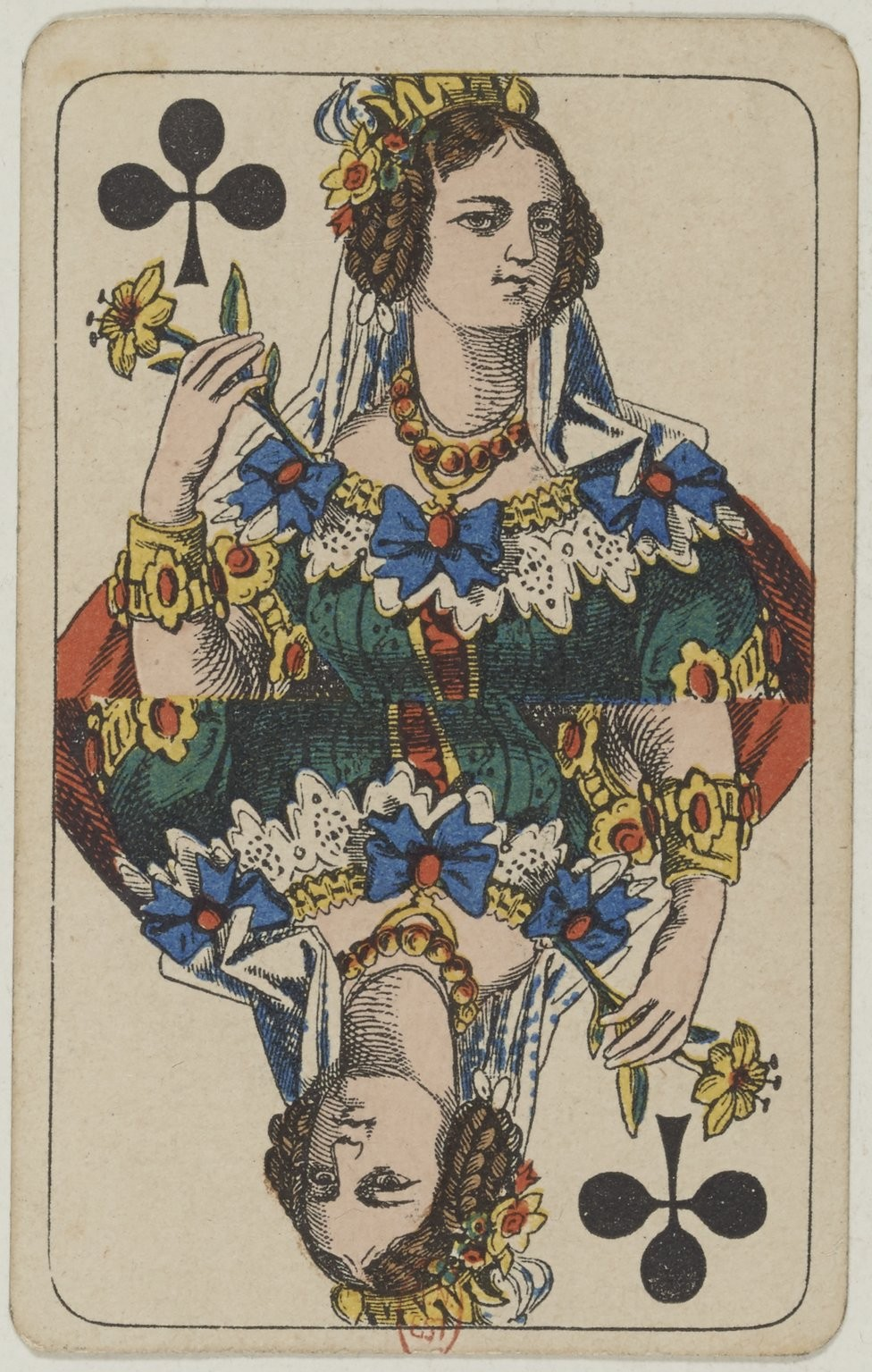
- The Queen of Clubs - the key card
- Origin: Silesia, Germany
- Type: Shedding / Beating
- Players: 4
- Cards: 52
- Deck: French pack
- Rank (high→low): A K Q J 10 9 8 7 6 5 4 3 2
- Play: Clockwise

Related games
- Bauernheinrich • Calypso Dudák, • Svoi Kozyri

Hund is a card game, which is especially common in Silesia but not well known in Germany. It is played between four players using a standard French pack of 52 cards (from 2 to Ace minus the Jokers). The aim of the game is to get rid of all one's cards as quickly as possible to one's opponents. The game has no winner, only a loser: when one player has all the cards in hand, that player loses the game and is known as the "dog" (Hund) hence the name of the game.

The feature of each player having an individual trump suit means that it is related to games like Bauernheinrich, Calypso, Dudák and Svoi Kozyri.

== Rules ==
- The aim of the game is to be the first to discard all cards.
- The player who has all the cards in his hand at the end of the game is the loser.
- The player with the ♣2 must start by playing it out.
- The following player must play two cards: one of higher value or, if he does not have it, take the cards and then a second card of his choice.
- Until the ♣Q is played, a 'higher card' is a card of a higher rank in the same suit (♣, ♠, ♥, ♦). Suit must always be followed or the pile must be picked up.
- Cards are played in turn in this way until one player has to pick up the pile, after which the next player plays one card.
- Once the ♣Q is played, this player has Clubs as his trump suit, and the remaining three players, Spades, Hearts and Diamonds, in clockwise order. So it is a major tactical advantage to hold the ♣Q.
- From this point on, a card of a player's personal trump suit beats a card of any other suit, but not a higher card of the same suit.
- The game continues until a player has all cards in his hand, or it is foreseeable that a player will be forced to lose.
- A player who loses three times in a row is the "dog".

== Playing ==
All the cards are dealt to the four players, who then sort their hand cards by suit and rank (from 2 to Ace). The player with the ♣2 starts. He must play this card.

The next player must play a higher card or take the card into his hand. He is also allowed to voluntarily take the cards on the table. If he could or wanted to trump the 2 of Clubs, he plays a card of his choice. This can also be of a suit other than Clubs. If he had to or wanted to take the card, it is the turn of the next player to play a card of his choice. Cards are played consecutively onto a pile until a player picks it up. Once a player has picked up the pile, the next player plays only one card and the following player plays two cards as described above.

This is repeated until a player plays the ♣Q. From this point on, all players also have a "trump suit" which beats all other suits. Clockwise, these are: Clubs for the player with the ♣Q, Spades, Hearts and Diamonds. Now the player with Diamonds as his trump card can trump e.g. a Heart King with a Diamond 2, but not a Diamond King with a lower Diamond card.

The game allows the player many tactical options. This begins with the choice of the cards to be played, through the attempt to find out who has the ♣Q in the first part of the game (this player will try to get as many Clubs as possible into his hand and thus also take piles which he does not necessarily have to take or deliberately does not take), to the choice of which piles of cards to take voluntarily or not.

== Example ==
Player 1: plays ♣2	Pile: 1 card, ♣2 on top
Player 2: trumps with the ♣7 and plays the ♥2	Pile: 3 cards, ♥2 on top
Player 3: trumps with the ♥9 and plays (tactically rather unwisely) ♦A	Pile: 5 cards, ♦A on top
Player 4: must pick the pile up because he has no trumps and the Ace is the highest card	Pile: empty
Player 1: plays the ♦2	Pile: 1 card, ♦2 on top
Player 2: trumps with the ♣Q (from now on Clubs is his trump suit), and plays the ♠2	Pile: 3 cards, ♠2 on top
Player 3: chooses to pick the cards up willingly	Pile: empty
Player 4: plays the ♣7 out	and so on until one player has all the cards in his hand

== Tactics ==
Hund requires tactical skill and a good memory. A good memory is important in working out which player has which important cards. Tactical skill is needed to turn this knowledge into favourable moves.

In a normal move, two cards are played. The first is a defensive card; it must be used to prevent having to pick up the cards on the table. Here you must be careful not to play too high a defensive card and to keep your own trump suit (if known) in your hand. At the same time you should avoid giving high cards of your trump suit to other players, especially with small piles. So it is generally as high as necessary, but low as possible.

The second card to play is the offensive card. This serves either to force the next player to pick up the pile, or force him to play a high card as a defensive card. This card can also be used to get rid of a low card. Especially with small piles, this option is often used. Only after a certain number of cards are in the pile is it worth playing high attack cards.

The ability to pick up the pile voluntarily allows players to acquire useful cards in their hands. Here you always have to balance the use of the good cards against the damage caused by unwanted cards in the pile. In general, it is worth taking a pile if it contains more cards of your trump suit than cards of a different suit.

== Literature ==
- Arnold, Peter (1995). The Book of Card Games. Barnes & Noble, USA
