= Aschberg (Schleswig-Holstein) =

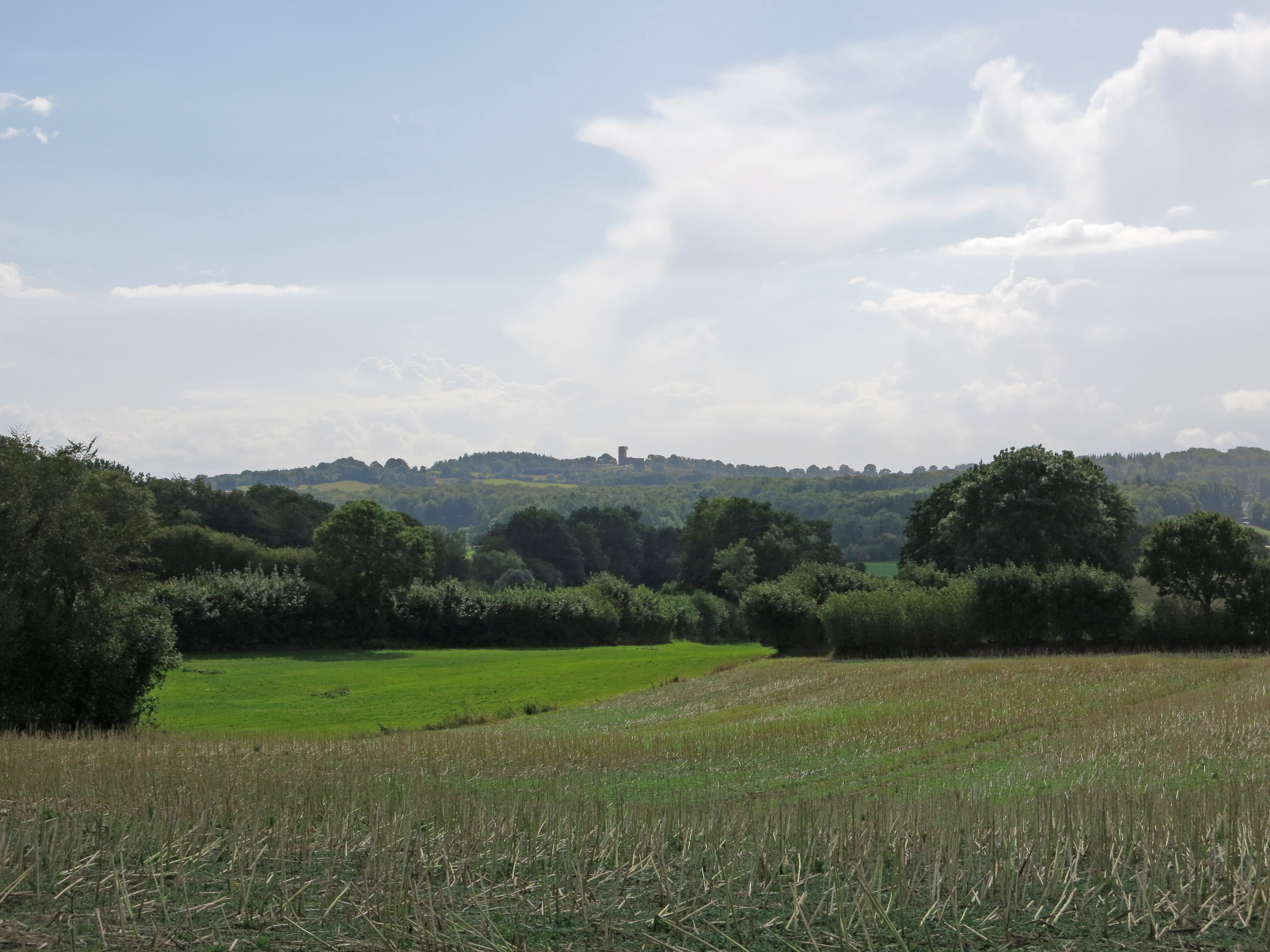
- The Aschberg from the northeast

Highest point
- Elevation: 98 m above sea level (NN) (322 ft)
- Listing: Hills of Schleswig-Holstein
- Coordinates: 54°25′02″N 9°41′29″E

Geography
- Location within Schleswig-Holstein
- Location: Rendsburg-Eckernförde, Schleswig-Holstein
- Parent range: Hütten Hills

The Aschberg is a hill, 98 m above sea level (NN), in the Hütten Hills Nature Park in Schleswig-Holstein, Germany. In good weather, the view reaches as far as the Baltic Sea. The Nature Park Way, which links five nature parks in Schleswig-Holstein for ramblers, runs over the Aschberg.

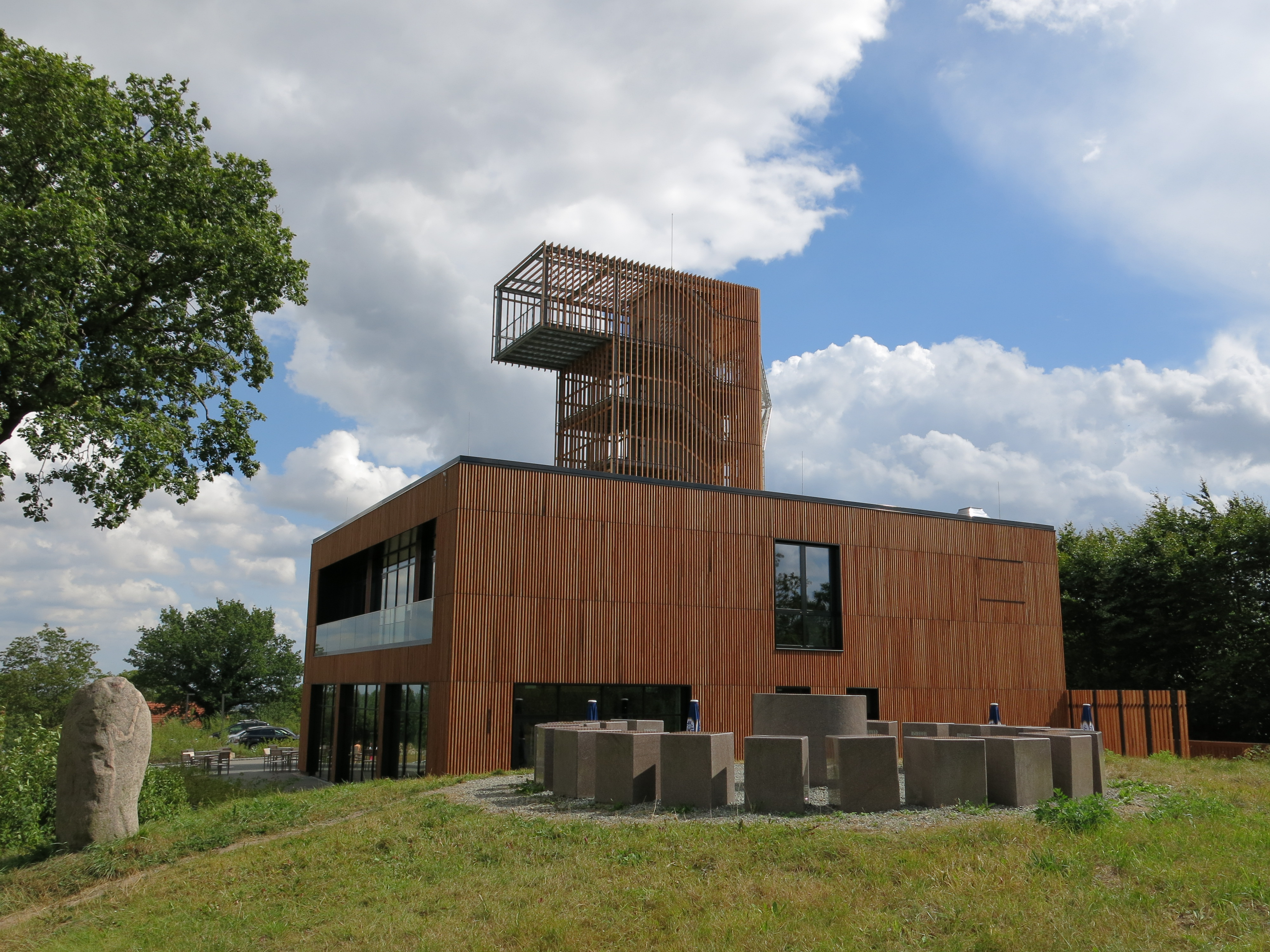
Observation tower and Globetrotter Lodge

Since 1930, the 7-metre-high Bismarck statue has stood on the Aschberg. Following a resolution by the Knivsberg Gesellschaft, it was salvaged in 1919 from the alcove of the Bismarck tower on the Knivsberg near Apenrade in North Schleswig. The statue, based on a design by sculptor, Adolf Brütt, was made by the Berlin metal sculptor, Gustav Lind, in copper repoussé work. In the late 19th century an observation tower, made of wood, was first erected on the highest point, but it was replaced by a newer wooden tower after just a few years. This roughly 10-metre-high tower was called the Kaiser-Wilhelm-Turm (Emperor William Tower). It existed until 1918.

In 2012 and 2013 the roughly 10 hectare area on the Aschberg was remodelled at a cost of 11 million euros. After three years of planning and 18 months of construction, a hotel was built with 30 double rooms, a seminar building with restaurant and a roughly 20-metre-high observation and climbing tower. The opening of the climbing tower, the erection of an adjacent multi-function area and opening of a youth hostel followed in 2014.

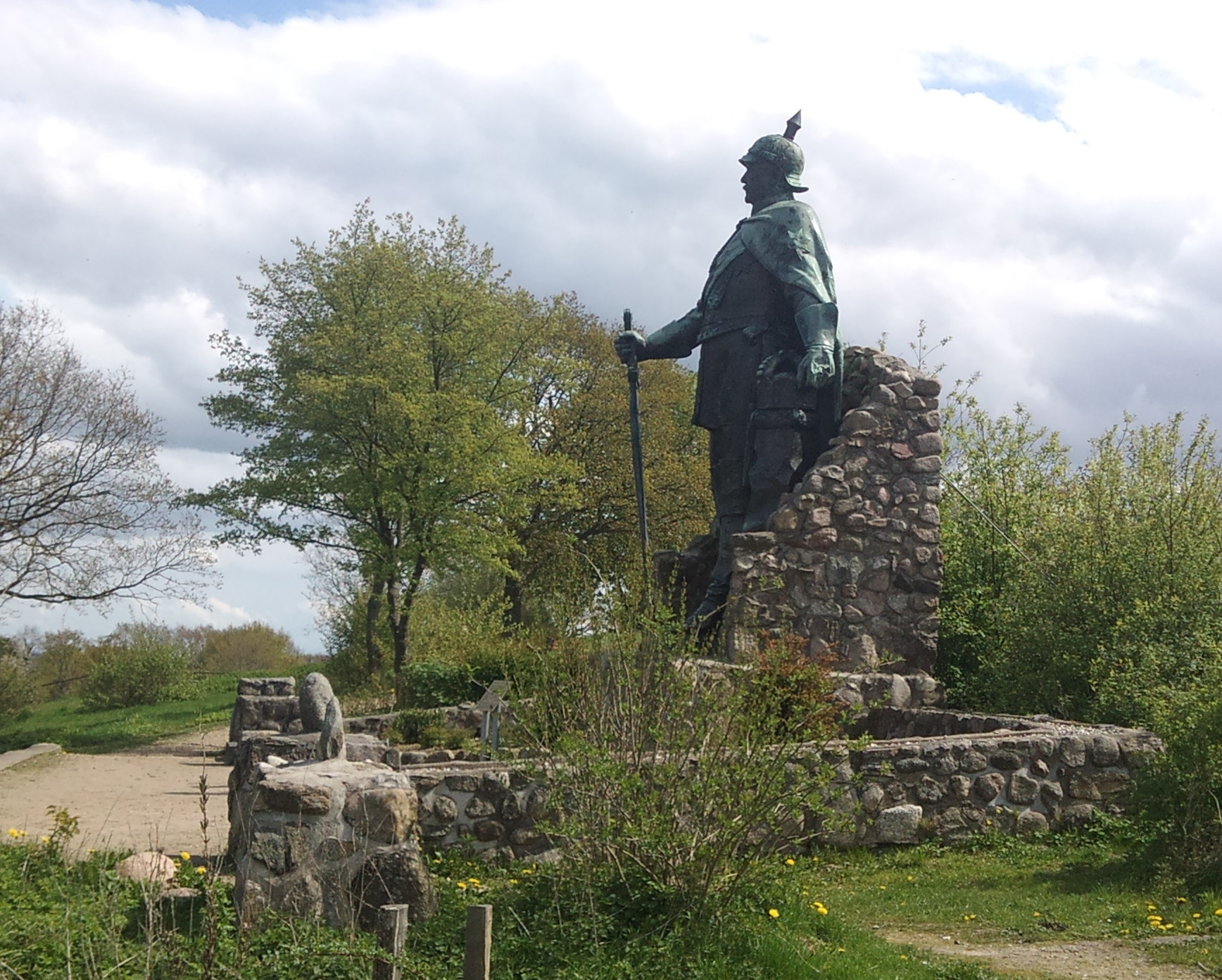
The Bismarck monument on the Aschberg from the west

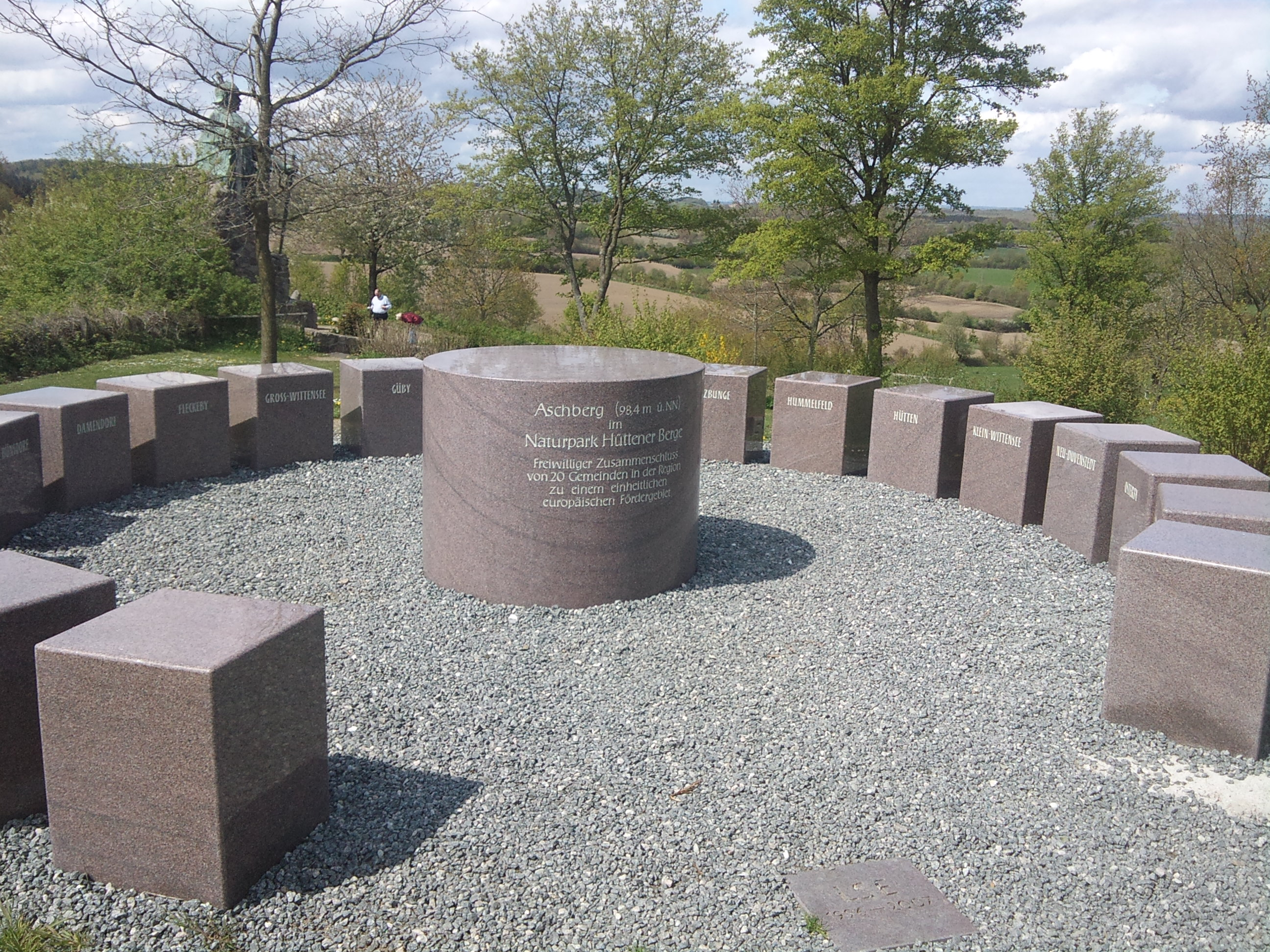
Highest point of the Aschberg. On the rocks are the names of the 20 municipalities of the surrounding Hütten Hills Nature Park.
