= Sorge (Eider) =

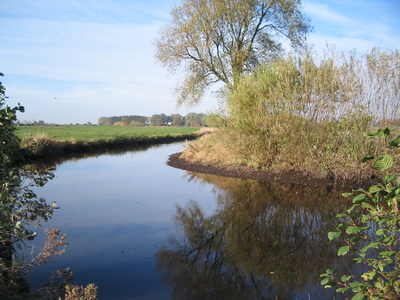
- Sorge river in the marshes

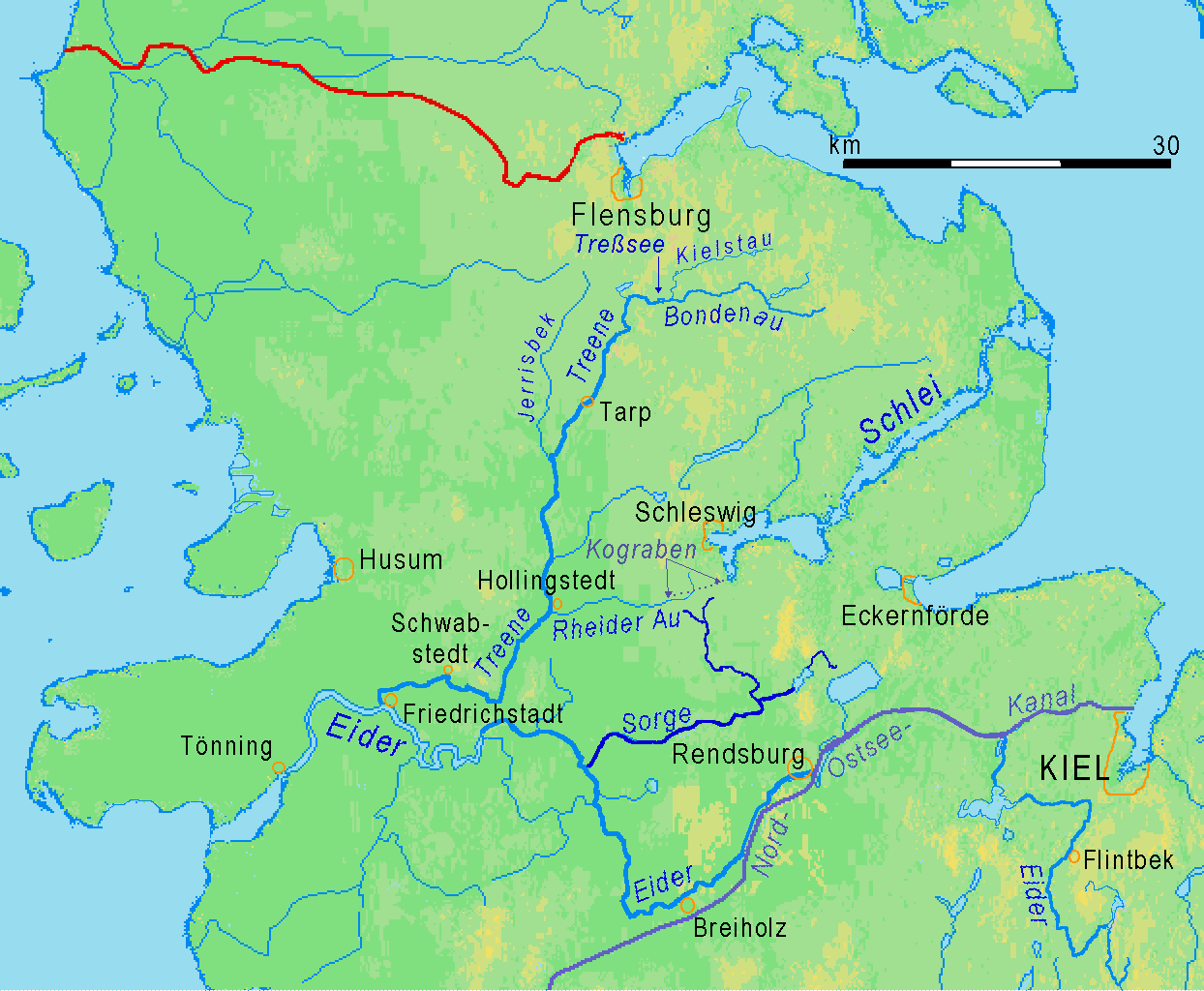
- Sorge river in the Eider system in Schleswig-Holstein

Location
- Country: Germany
- State: Schleswig-Holstein

Physical characteristics
- Mouth
  - location: Eider
  - coordinates: 54.2894°N 9.3936°E
- Length: 29.4 km (18.3 mi)

Basin features
- Progression: Eider→ North Sea

The Sorge (German pronunciation: [ˈzɔʁɡə]) is a right affluent of river Eider in Schleswig-Holstein, Germany.

According to the actual naming, it has a length of 29.4 kilometres (18.3 mi). It is formed by the confluence of two streams or small rivers. The shorter one is called Stente. It is the outlet of a lake called Bistensee. Half way it passes the mill's pond of the hamlet of Stenten. Below this pond it was called "Sorge", too, as late as in official maps printed in the year 2000. The main affluent of Bistensee and the length of this lake included, this top tributary is 11.15 kilometres (6.93 mi) long. The other top tributary is longer, 15.9 kilometres (9.9 mi). Its upper section is called Boklunder Au, the lower one Mühlenau, in 2000 still Mühlenbach. But there is another Mühlenbach (mill stream), nearby, joining river Sorge from the left (i. e. southern) side.

From the confluence of its sources, river Sorge mainly flows westward. In the moraine region of Geest, it is crossed by the historical Oxen Way, as Hærvejen is called in Germany. West of it and much more in the marshes west of Tetenhusen, the course of the river underwent great changes since the early 17th century, due to the cultivation efforts of Dutch settlers. Parts of the old course have disappeared, but a significant rest, up river cut off the waterway and called Alte Sorge, is a natural reserve, now.

== See also ==
- List of rivers of Schleswig-Holstein
