= Ascheffel =

Ascheffel Askfelt
- Municipality
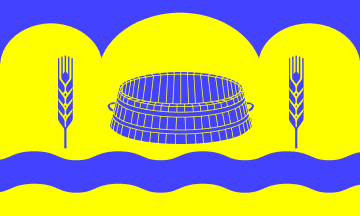
- Flag Coat of arms

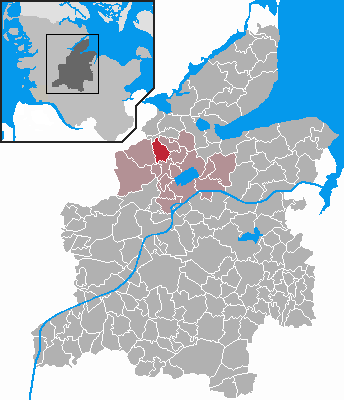
- Location of Ascheffel; Askfelt within Rendsburg-Eckernförde district
- Interactive map of Ascheffel; Askfelt
- Location within Germany Location within Schleswig-Holstein
- Coordinates: 54°26′N 9°42′E
- Country: Germany
- State: Schleswig-Holstein
- District: Rendsburg-Eckernförde
- Municipal assoc.: Hüttener Berge

Government
  - Mayor: Günter Petersen

Area
  - Total: 10.39 km^{2} (4.01 sq mi)
- Elevation: 6 m (20 ft)

Population (2025-12-31)
  - Total: 977
  - Density: 94.0/km^{2} (244/sq mi)
- Time zone: UTC+01:00 (CET)
  - Summer (DST): UTC+02:00 (CEST)
- Postal codes: 24358
- Dialling codes: 04353
- Vehicle registration: RD
- Website: www.amt-huettener-berge.de

Ascheffel (Danish: Askfelt) is a municipality in Rendsburg-Eckernförde, Schleswig-Holstein, Germany.

The location of Ascheffel is south of the municipality of Hummelfeld, north of Ahlefeld-Bistensee, and east of Brekendorf.
