= Sehestedt =

- Municipality
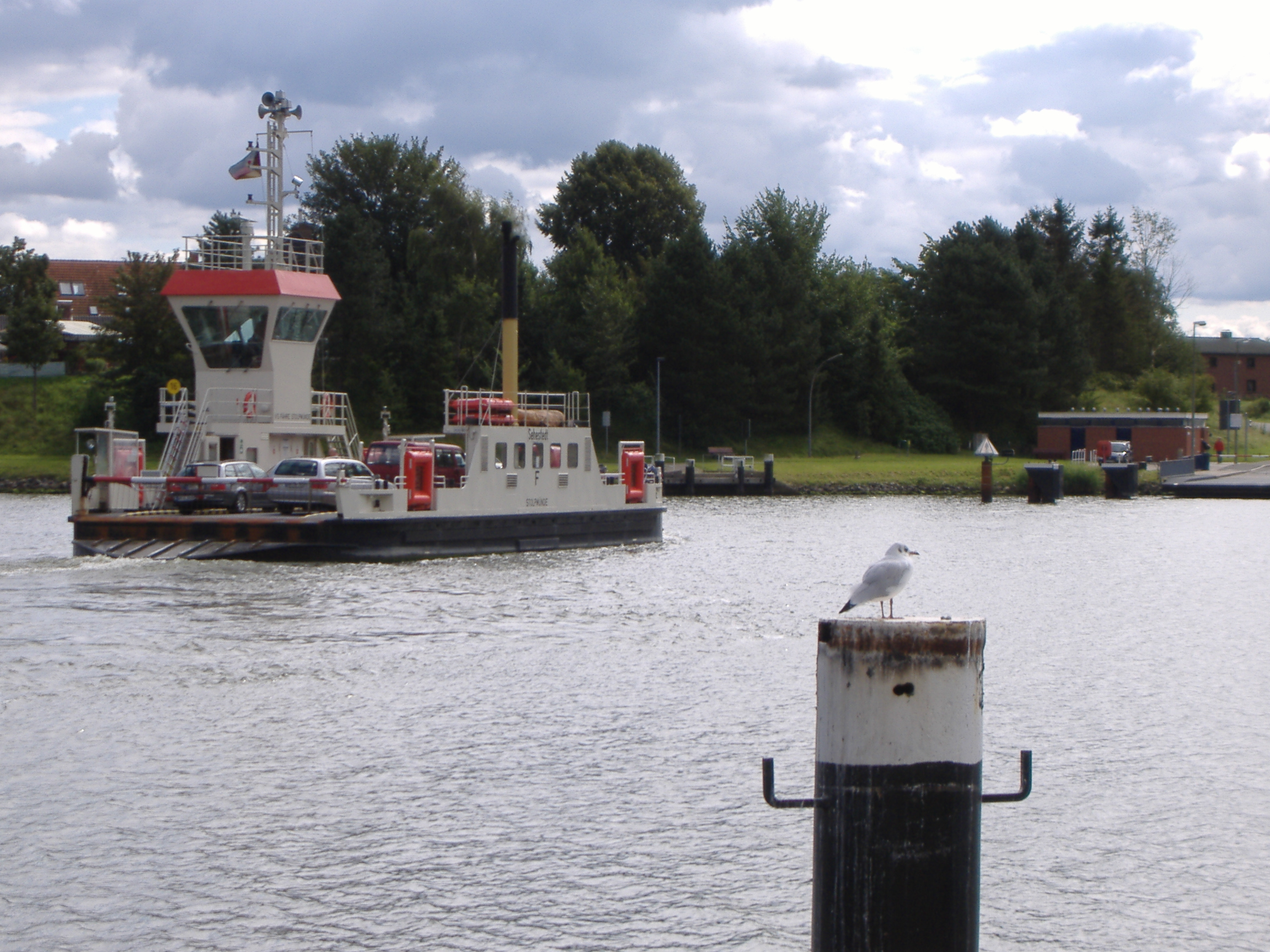
- Ferry across the Kiel Canal at Sehestedt

- Flag Coat of arms

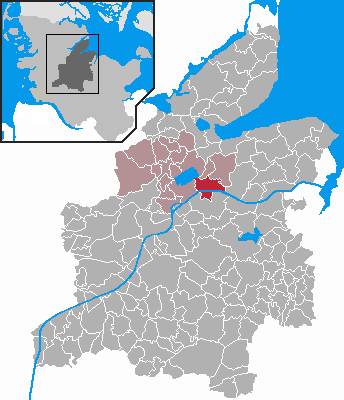
- Location of Sehestedt within Rendsburg-Eckernförde district
- Interactive map of Sehestedt
- Location within Germany Location within Schleswig-Holstein
- Coordinates: 54°22′N 9°49′E
- Country: Germany
- State: Schleswig-Holstein
- District: Rendsburg-Eckernförde
- Municipal assoc.: Hüttener Berge

Government
  - Mayor: Rita Koop

Area
  - Total: 15.25 km^{2} (5.89 sq mi)
- Elevation: 7 m (23 ft)

Population (2025-12-31)
  - Total: 771
  - Density: 50.6/km^{2} (131/sq mi)
- Time zone: UTC+01:00 (CET)
  - Summer (DST): UTC+02:00 (CEST)
- Postal codes: 24814
- Dialling codes: 04357
- Vehicle registration: RD
- Website: www.amt-huettener- berge.de

Sehestedt (Danish: Sehested) is a municipality in the district of Rendsburg-Eckernförde, in Schleswig-Holstein, Germany.

Sehestedt is south of the municipality of Groß Wittensee, Haby or Holtsee, but north of Bovenau, and west of Lindau. It is divided into two parts by the Kiel Canal, which has to be crossed by a ferry.

== History ==
In the course of the War of the Sixth Coalition against Napoleon, the Battle of Sehested was fought here between Danish forces and a coalition of Sweden, Prussia and Russia on 10 December 1813. The result was a Danish victory which could however not prevent Denmark's subsequent defeat in the war.
