= Die Heimat (journal) =

Schleswig-Holstein monthly journal from 1891-2002

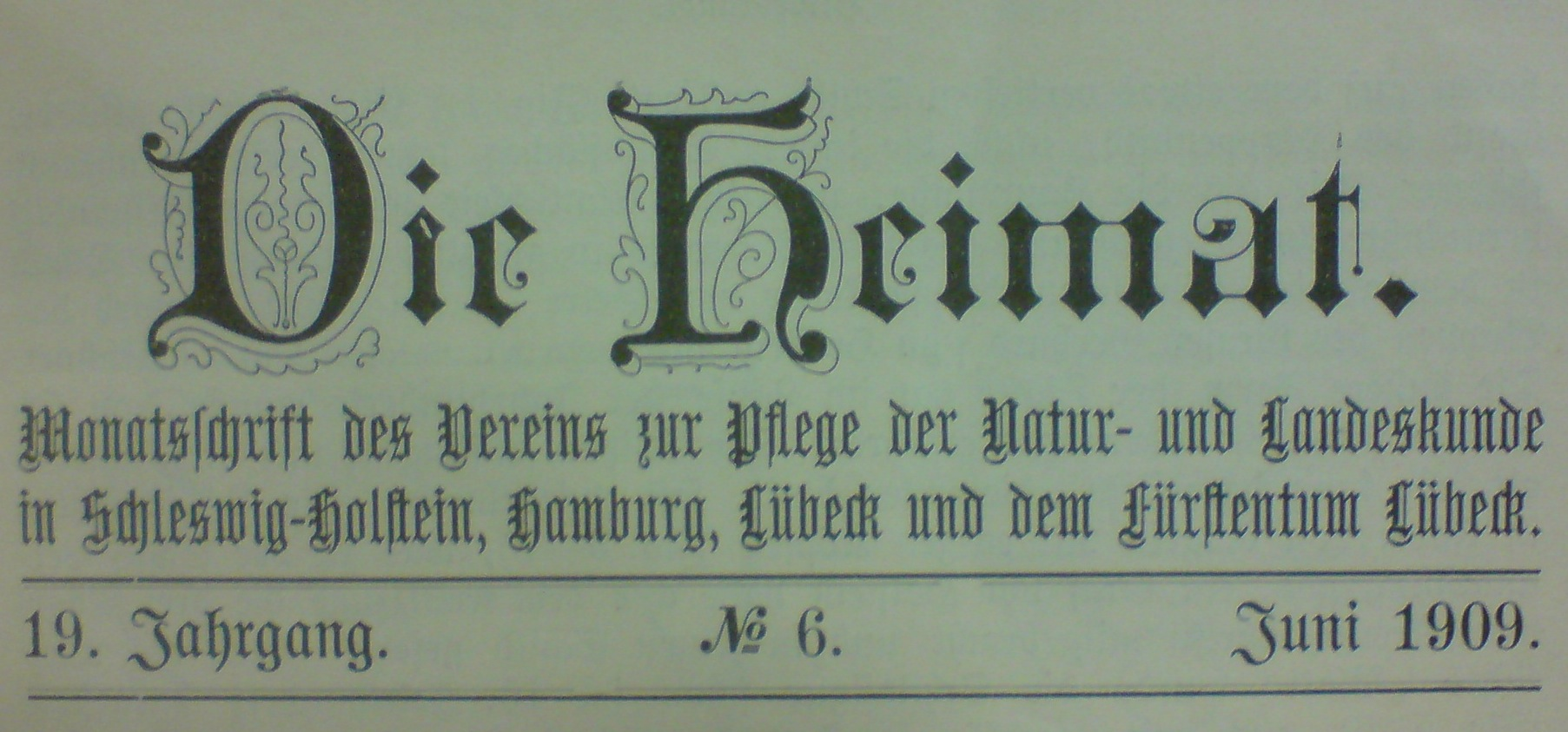
1909 title from the journal cover

Die Heimat was the title of a monthly journal that was published from 1891 to 2002 on the subject of the natural history and regional culture of Schleswig-Holstein and neighbouring regions. Since 2003, the journal has been called Natur- und Landeskunde: Zeitschrift für Schleswig-Holstein, Hamburg und Mecklenburg ("Natural History and Regional Culture: Journal for Schleswig-Holstein, Hamburg and Mecklenburg").

== Editors ==
- 1891–1896: Heinrich Dannmeier (1852–1937)
- 1897–1900: Heinrich Lund (1855–1916)
- 1901–1911: Joachim Eckmann (1850–1922)
- 1911–1914: Friedrich Lorentzen (1868–1914)
- 1914–1917: Heinrich Barfod (1870–1917)
- 1917–1920: Joachim Eckmann (1850–1922)
- 1920–1943: Gustav Friedrich Meyer (1878–1945)
- 1947: Reinhold Stolze (1890– )
- 1947–1963: Willi Christiansen (1885– )
- 1963–1973: Nicolaus Detlefsen (1897– )
- 1974–1978: Christian Radke
- since 1979: Wolfgang Riedel

== Publishers ==
The publishing society has changed its name three times during its history:

- Verein zur Pflege der Natur- und Landeskunde in Schleswig-Holstein, Hamburg, Lübeck und dem Fürstentum Lübeck
- Verein zur Pflege der Natur- und Landeskunde in Schleswig-Holstein, Hamburg und Lübeck
- Verein zur Pflege der Natur- und Landeskunde in Schleswig-Holstein und Hamburg
- Verein zur Pflege der Natur- und Landeskunde in Schleswig-Holstein, Hamburg und Mecklenburg - Die Heimat
