= Sarlhusen =

- Municipality
- Coat of arms

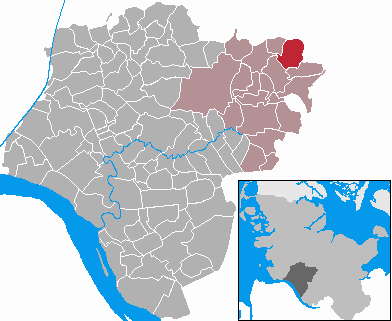
- Location of Sarlhusen within Steinburg district
- Interactive map of Sarlhusen
- Location within Germany Location within Schleswig-Holstein
- Coordinates: 54°1′N 9°46′E
- Country: Germany
- State: Schleswig-Holstein
- District: Steinburg
- Municipal assoc.: Kellinghusen

Government
  - Mayor: Ernst Scheel

Area
  - Total: 10.86 km^{2} (4.19 sq mi)
- Elevation: 14 m (46 ft)

Population (2025-12-31)
  - Total: 453
  - Density: 41.7/km^{2} (108/sq mi)
- Time zone: UTC+01:00 (CET)
  - Summer (DST): UTC+02:00 (CEST)
- Postal codes: 24616
- Dialling codes: 04324
- Vehicle registration: IZ
- Website: www.kellinghusen.de

Sarlhusen is a municipality in the district of Steinburg, in Schleswig-Holstein, Germany.
