= Kirchnüchel =

- Municipality
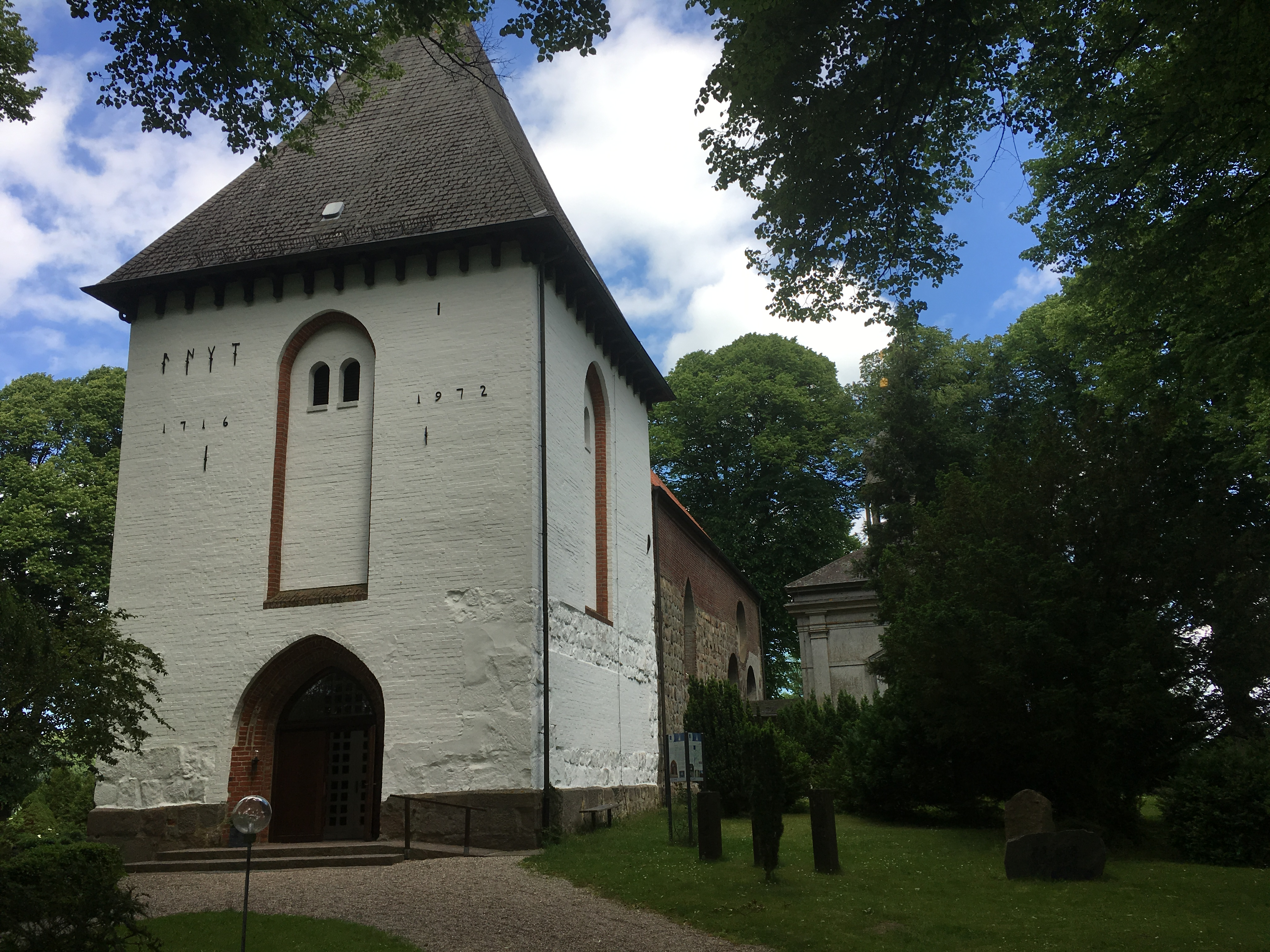
- Church in Kirchnüchel

- Coat of arms

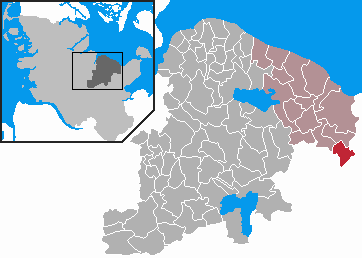
- Location of Kirchnüchel within Plön district
- Interactive map of Kirchnüchel
- Location within Germany Location within Schleswig-Holstein
- Coordinates: 54°12′30″N 10°40′27″E
- Country: Germany
- State: Schleswig-Holstein
- District: Plön
- Municipal assoc.: Lütjenburg

Government
  - Mayor: Hans-Werner Ehlers

Area
  - Total: 10.09 km^{2} (3.90 sq mi)
- Elevation: 94 m (308 ft)

Population (2025-12-31)
  - Total: 193
  - Density: 19.1/km^{2} (49.5/sq mi)
- Time zone: UTC+01:00 (CET)
  - Summer (DST): UTC+02:00 (CEST)
- Postal codes: 23714
- Dialling codes: 04381, 04528
- Vehicle registration: PLÖ

Kirchnüchel is a municipality in the district of Plön, in Schleswig-Holstein, Germany.
