= Holtsee =

- Municipality
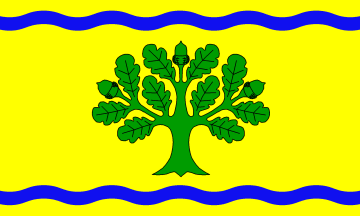
- Flag Coat of arms

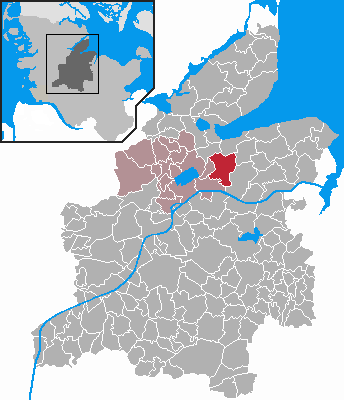
- Location of Holtsee within Rendsburg-Eckernförde district
- Interactive map of Holtsee
- Location within Germany Location within Schleswig-Holstein
- Coordinates: 54°24′N 9°51′E
- Country: Germany
- State: Schleswig-Holstein
- District: Rendsburg-Eckernförde
- Municipal assoc.: Hüttener Berge

Government
  - Mayor: Jens-Peter Frank (SPD)

Area
  - Total: 21.71 km^{2} (8.38 sq mi)
- Elevation: 23 m (75 ft)

Population (2025-12-31)
  - Total: 1,279
  - Density: 58.91/km^{2} (152.6/sq mi)
- Time zone: UTC+01:00 (CET)
  - Summer (DST): UTC+02:00 (CEST)
- Postal codes: 24363
- Dialling codes: 04351, 04357
- Vehicle registration: RD
- Website: www.amt-huettener- berge.de

Holtsee is a municipality in the district of Rendsburg-Eckernförde, in Schleswig-Holstein, Germany.

The location of Holtsee is south of the municipality of Goosefeld or Altenhof, but north of Sehestedt or Lindau, and east of Haby.

According to the 2022 Census, Holtsee has a population of 790 and covers a 0.6426 km² area. Holtsee is near Eckernförde Bay, a popular seaside tourist destination.
