= Owschlag =

- Municipality
- Flag Coat of arms

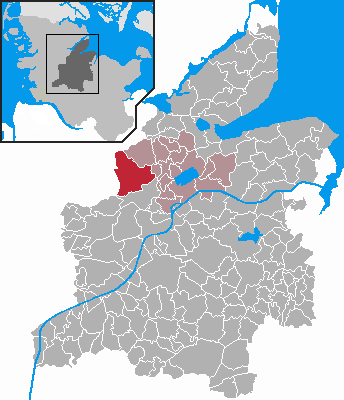
- Location of Owschlag within Rendsburg-Eckernförde district
- Interactive map of Owschlag
- Location within Germany Location within Schleswig-Holstein
- Coordinates: 54°23′41″N 9°35′29″E
- Country: Germany
- State: Schleswig-Holstein
- District: Rendsburg-Eckernförde
- Municipal assoc.: Hüttener Berge

Government
  - Mayor: Stephan Lübbers

Area
  - Total: 39.32 km^{2} (15.18 sq mi)
- Elevation: 14 m (46 ft)

Population (2025-12-31)
  - Total: 3,894
  - Density: 99.03/km^{2} (256.5/sq mi)
- Time zone: UTC+01:00 (CET)
  - Summer (DST): UTC+02:00 (CEST)
- Postal codes: 24811
- Dialling codes: 04336
- Vehicle registration: RD
- Website: www.amt-huettener- berge.de

Owschlag is a municipality in the district of Rendsburg-Eckernförde, in Schleswig-Holstein, Germany.
