= Neu Duvenstedt =

- Municipality
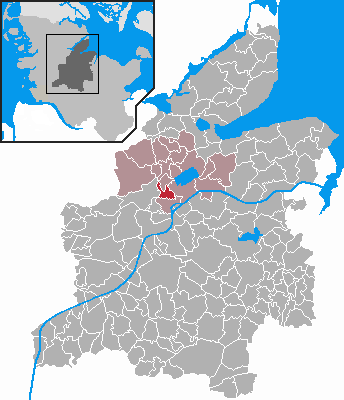
- Location of Neu Duvenstedt within Rendsburg-Eckernförde district
- Interactive map of Neu Duvenstedt
- Location within Germany Location within Schleswig-Holstein
- Coordinates: 54°22′N 9°40′E
- Country: Germany
- State: Schleswig-Holstein
- District: Rendsburg-Eckernförde
- Municipal assoc.: Hüttener Berge

Government
  - Mayor: Heinrich Dietrich Janzen

Area
  - Total: 5.71 km^{2} (2.20 sq mi)
- Elevation: 30 m (98 ft)

Population (2025-12-31)
  - Total: 111
  - Density: 19.4/km^{2} (50.3/sq mi)
- Time zone: UTC+01:00 (CET)
  - Summer (DST): UTC+02:00 (CEST)
- Postal codes: 24794
- Dialling codes: 04331, 04338
- Vehicle registration: RD
- Website: www.amt-huettener- berge.de

Neu Duvenstedt is a municipality in the district of Rendsburg-Eckernförde, in Schleswig-Holstein, Germany.
