= Hüttener Berge (Amt) =

- Amt
- Flag Coat of arms

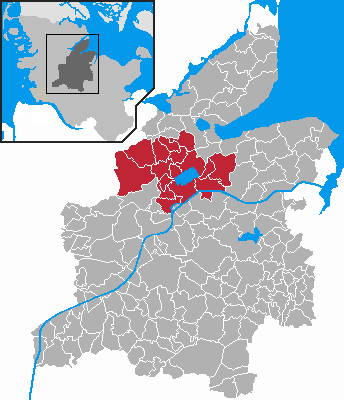
- Map of Rendsburg-Eckernförde highlighting Hüttener Berge
- Interactive map of Hüttener Berge
- Location within Germany Location within Schleswig-Holstein
- Coordinates: 54°24′N 9°46′E
- Country: Germany
- State: Schleswig-Holstein
- District: Rendsburg-Eckernförde
- Seat: Groß Wittensee
- Subdivisions: 16 municipalities

Government
  - Mayor: Ole Bening

Area
  - Total: 208.39 km^{2} (80.46 sq mi)

Population (2025-12-31)
  - Total: 14,932
  - Density: 71.654/km^{2} (185.58/sq mi)
- Time zone: UTC+01:00 (CET)
  - Summer (DST): UTC+02:00 (CEST)
- Website: www.amt-huettener-berge.de

Hüttener Berge is an Amt ("collective municipality") in the district of Rendsburg-Eckernförde, in Schleswig-Holstein, Germany. Its seat is in Groß Wittensee. It was formed on 1 January 2008 from the former Ämter Hütten and Wittensee.

The Amt Hüttener Berge consists of the following municipalities:

1. Ahlefeld-Bistensee
2. Ascheffel
3. Borgstedt
4. Brekendorf
5. Bünsdorf
6. Damendorf
7. Groß Wittensee
8. Haby
9. Holtsee
10. Holzbunge
11. Hütten
12. Klein Wittensee
13. Neu Duvenstedt
14. Osterby
15. Owschlag
16. Sehestedt
