= Damendorf =

- Municipality
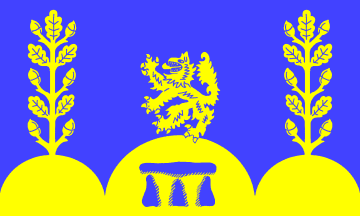
- Flag Coat of arms

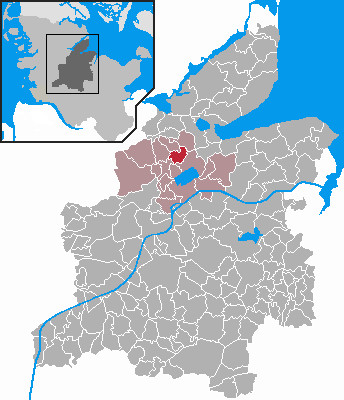
- Location of Damendorf within Rendsburg-Eckernförde district
- Interactive map of Damendorf
- Location within Germany Location within Schleswig-Holstein
- Coordinates: 54°25′32″N 9°44′12″E
- Country: Germany
- State: Schleswig-Holstein
- District: Rendsburg-Eckernförde
- Municipal assoc.: Hüttener Berge

Government
  - Mayor: Hans Ulrich

Area
  - Total: 7.48 km^{2} (2.89 sq mi)
- Elevation: 22 m (72 ft)

Population (2025-12-31)
  - Total: 432
  - Density: 57.8/km^{2} (150/sq mi)
- Time zone: UTC+01:00 (CET)
  - Summer (DST): UTC+02:00 (CEST)
- Postal codes: 24361
- Dialling codes: 04353
- Vehicle registration: RD
- Website: www.amt-huettener- berge.de

Damendorf (Danish: Damtorp) is a municipality in the district of Rendsburg-Eckernförde, in Schleswig-Holstein, Germany.
