= Borgstedt =

- Municipality
- Flag Coat of arms

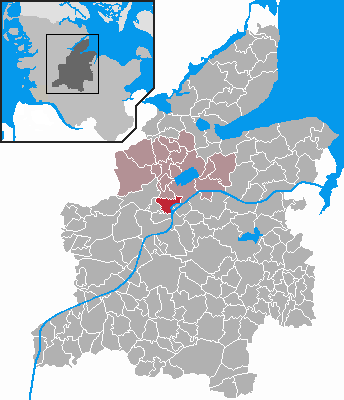
- Location of Borgstedt within Rendsburg-Eckernförde district
- Interactive map of Borgstedt
- Location within Germany Location within Schleswig-Holstein
- Coordinates: 54°19′N 9°43′E
- Country: Germany
- State: Schleswig-Holstein
- District: Rendsburg-Eckernförde
- Municipal assoc.: Hüttener Berge

Government
  - Mayor: Gero Neidlinger (CDU)

Area
  - Total: 9.40 km^{2} (3.63 sq mi)
- Elevation: 9 m (30 ft)

Population (2025-12-31)
  - Total: 1,737
  - Density: 185/km^{2} (479/sq mi)
- Time zone: UTC+01:00 (CET)
  - Summer (DST): UTC+02:00 (CEST)
- Postal codes: 24794
- Dialling codes: 04331
- Vehicle registration: RD
- Website: www.amt-huettener- berge.de

Borgstedt (Danish: Borgsted) is a municipality in the district of Rendsburg-Eckernförde, in Schleswig-Holstein, Germany.
