= Ahlefeld-Bistensee =

- Municipality
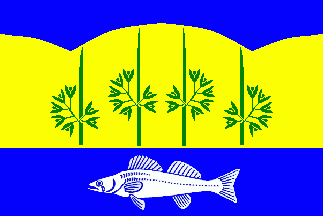
- Flag Coat of arms

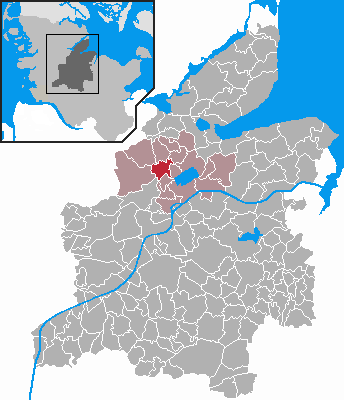
- Location of Ahlefeld-Bistensee within Rendsburg-Eckernförde district
- Interactive map of Ahlefeld-Bistensee
- Location within Germany Location within Schleswig-Holstein
- Coordinates: 54°24′N 09°40′E
- Country: Germany
- State: Schleswig-Holstein
- District: Rendsburg-Eckernförde
- Municipal assoc.: Hüttener Berge

Government
  - Mayor: Andreas Brück (CDU)

Area
  - Total: 10.04 km^{2} (3.88 sq mi)
- Elevation: 15 m (49 ft)

Population (2025-12-31)
  - Total: 492
  - Density: 49.0/km^{2} (127/sq mi)
- Time zone: UTC+01:00 (CET)
  - Summer (DST): UTC+02:00 (CEST)
- Postal codes: 24811 (Ahlefeld), 24358 (Bistensee)
- Dialling codes: 04353
- Vehicle registration: RD
- Website: www.amt-huettener- berge.de

Ahlefeld-Bistensee is a municipality in the district of Rendsburg-Eckernförde, in Schleswig-Holstein, Germany. It was formed on 1 March 2008 from the former municipalities Ahlefeld and Bistensee.
