= Bungsberg =

Highest point in Schleswig-Holstein, Germany

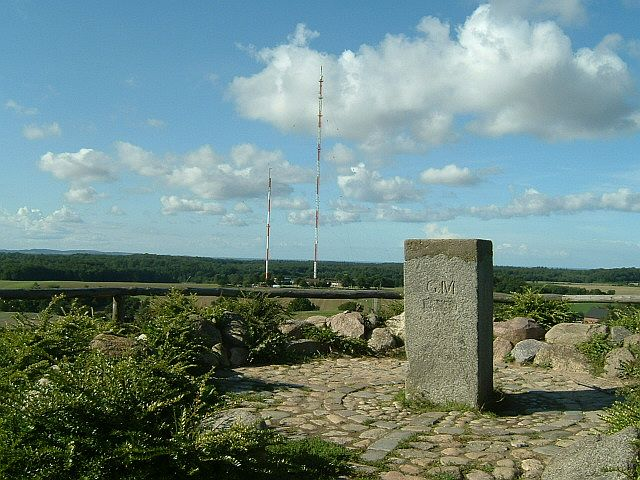
- Summit stone and transmission masts

Highest point
- Elevation: 168 m above sea level (NN) (551 ft)
- Listing: Highest elevation in Schleswig-Holstein
- Coordinates: 54°12′39″N 10°43′26″E

Geography
- Location within Schleswig-Holstein
- Location: Schleswig-Holstein, Germany
- Parent range: Holstein Switzerland

Geology
- Rock age: Saale glaciation
- Mountain type: Ice-age terminal moraine

The Bungsberg (German pronunciation) is the highest point in the north German state of Schleswig-Holstein (elevation: 168 metres (551 ft)). It lies in the region known as Holstein Switzerland in the municipality of Schönwalde am Bungsberg between Scheelholz and Mönchsneversdorf.

The Bungsberg telecommunications tower is located on the Bungsberg.

One of the longest rivers in Schleswig-Holstein, the Schwentine, rises on the Bungsberg.

== Formation ==
The Bungsberg is an ice age terminal moraine. Unusually, though, it was formed in the Saale glaciation period about 150,000 years ago. During the subsequent Weichselian glaciation – only about 10,000 years ago – the ice sheet could not cover the hill due to its height, it could only flow around it, and it therefore formed a nunatak.

== Leisure and recreation ==
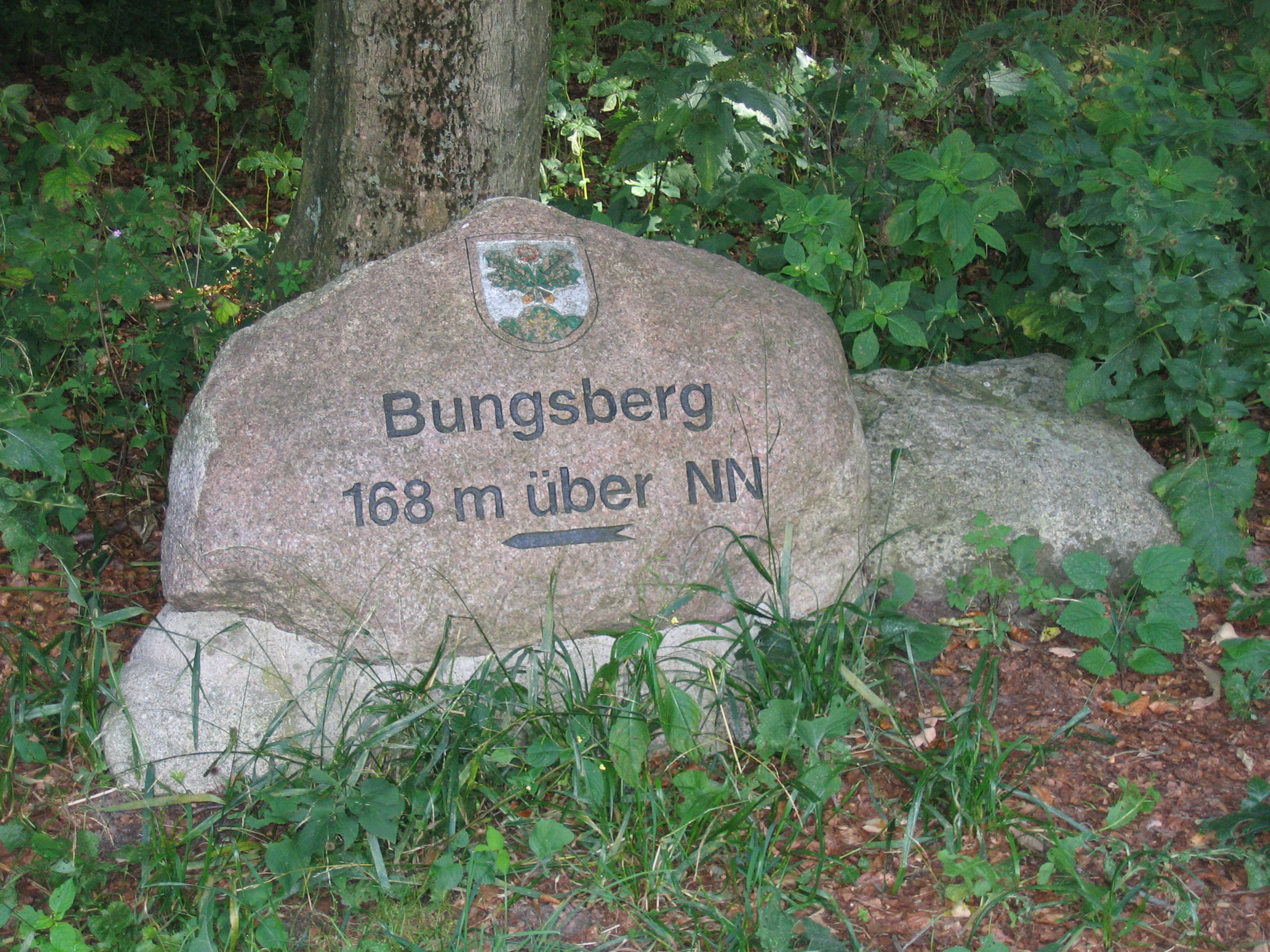
Signpost to the hill

Today the Bungsberg is a very popular viewing point, from which the Baltic Sea may be seen in good weather. An observation tower, the Elisabethturm, was built in 1863 and 1864 on the Bungsberg by the Grand Duke of Oldenburg and, after being increased in height by four metres in 1875, is 22 metres high. It is not open to the public today.

As a replacement, a viewing platform was installed halfway up the telecommunications tower on the Bungsberg (see below). In April 2007, the facilities for visitors to the Bungsberg looked rather neglected. The inn was largely demolished and completely fenced off. The observation deck was closed due to vandalism. In late May 2007, after two years of restoration, the tower was re-opened to visitors. Those who climbed the 200 steps to the viewing platform had a unique view in clear weather over large parts of Schleswig-Holstein, and beyond to Mecklenburg-Vorpommern. Later, the platform was closed again.

In winter the Bungsberg is Germany's most northerly skiing area and the only one in Schleswig-Holstein with its own drag lift installed for the few days each year when there is enough snow cover. A downhill run on one of the three pistes lasts about 25 seconds; the lift takes a minute and a half to haul skiers to the top. One piste is for tobogganists and two for skiers or snowboarders. The 300-metre-long downhill piste has a gradient of 17 grad. In the 2009-2010 season up to several hundred people used the slopes daily, some even travelling from Lübeck, Hamburg or Kiel. The 250-metre-long steel cable lift with its 34 zinc pylons can in theory transport up to 600 people an hour to the summit. It was procured in 1970-1971 by the parish of Schönwald am Bungsberg in order to increase tourism. As a result of the weather the lift ran for only one week in 2008-2009 and not at all in 2007-2008. Several years ago snow cannon were employed by an event organiser.

In 2013, the Bungsberg Special Purpose Association (Zweckverband Bungsberg) and the Sparkasse Bank Foundation of East Holstein invested in work to increase the attraction of the Bungsberg as a tourist destination for the whole family and as an educational site for schools as part of the East Holsten Education Pass (Bildungsspaß Ostholstein). In 2014 the newly built Waldschänke inn opened so that there was once again a restaurant on the site. The owners declared bankruptcy in 2019 and closed. As of May 2025 it has not been replaced.

== Bungsberg telecommunication tower and NDR transmission mast ==
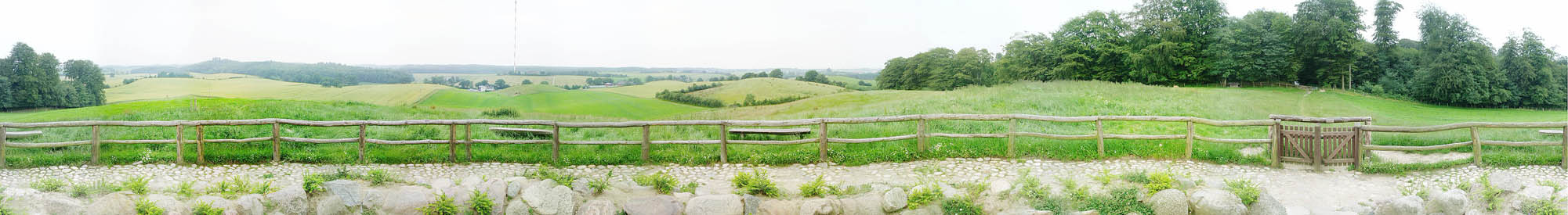
Panorama from the Bungsberg
