= Hütten, Schleswig-Holstein =

Hütten Hytten
- Municipality
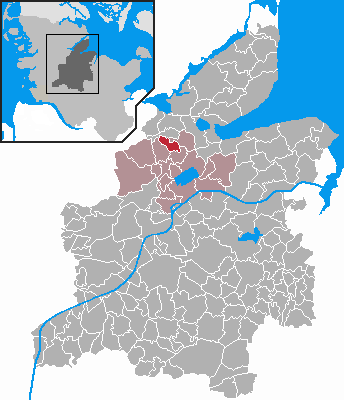
- Location of Hütten; Hytten within Rendsburg-Eckernförde district
- Interactive map of Hütten; Hytten
- Location within Germany Location within Schleswig-Holstein
- Coordinates: 54°26′N 9°43′E
- Country: Germany
- State: Schleswig-Holstein
- District: Rendsburg-Eckernförde
- Municipal assoc.: Hüttener Berge

Government
  - Mayor: Heinz Henningsen

Area
  - Total: 6.91 km^{2} (2.67 sq mi)
- Elevation: 5 m (16 ft)

Population (2025-12-31)
  - Total: 230
  - Density: 33/km^{2} (86/sq mi)
- Time zone: UTC+01:00 (CET)
  - Summer (DST): UTC+02:00 (CEST)
- Postal codes: 24358
- Dialling codes: 04353
- Vehicle registration: RD
- Website: www.amt-huettener-berge.de

Hütten (German pronunciation: [ˈhʏtn̩]; Danish: Hytten) is a municipality in the district of Rendsburg-Eckernförde, in Schleswig-Holstein, Germany. It is situated approximately 8 km southwest of Eckernförde.

Hütten is part of the Amt ("collective municipality") Hüttener Berge. The seat of the Amt is in Groß Wittensee.
