= Brekendorf =

- Municipality
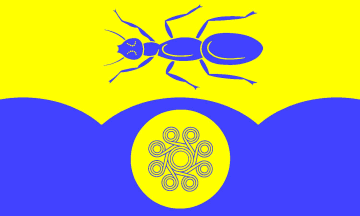
- Flag Coat of arms

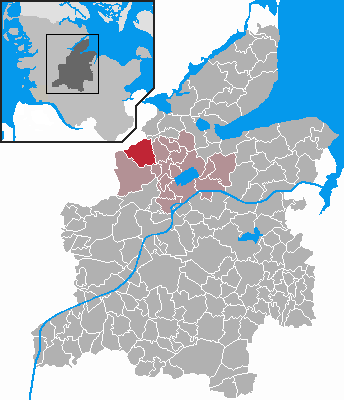
- Location of Brekendorf within Rendsburg-Eckernförde district
- Interactive map of Brekendorf
- Location within Germany Location within Schleswig-Holstein
- Coordinates: 54°25′N 9°38′E
- Country: Germany
- State: Schleswig-Holstein
- District: Rendsburg-Eckernförde
- Municipal assoc.: Hüttener Berge

Government
  - Mayor: Gerhard Guthardt

Area
  - Total: 20.48 km^{2} (7.91 sq mi)
- Elevation: 46 m (151 ft)

Population (2025-12-31)
  - Total: 1,015
  - Density: 49.56/km^{2} (128.4/sq mi)
- Time zone: UTC+01:00 (CET)
  - Summer (DST): UTC+02:00 (CEST)
- Postal codes: 24811
- Dialling codes: 04336
- Vehicle registration: RD
- Website: www.amt-huettener- berge.de

Brekendorf is a municipality in the district of Rendsburg-Eckernförde, in Schleswig-Holstein, Germany.
