= Holzbunge =

- Municipality
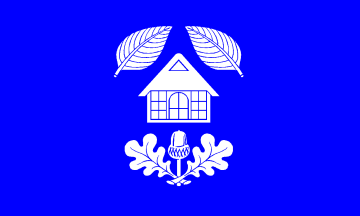
- Flag Coat of arms

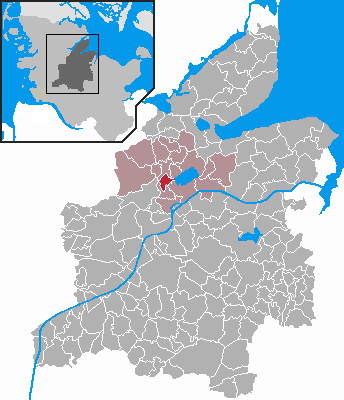
- Location of Holzbunge within Rendsburg-Eckernförde district
- Interactive map of Holzbunge
- Location within Germany Location within Schleswig-Holstein
- Coordinates: 54°22′N 9°41′E
- Country: Germany
- State: Schleswig-Holstein
- District: Rendsburg-Eckernförde
- Municipal assoc.: Hüttener Berge

Government
  - Mayor: Klaus Koll

Area
  - Total: 5.19 km^{2} (2.00 sq mi)
- Elevation: 19 m (62 ft)

Population (2025-12-31)
  - Total: 368
  - Density: 70.9/km^{2} (184/sq mi)
- Time zone: UTC+01:00 (CET)
  - Summer (DST): UTC+02:00 (CEST)
- Postal codes: 24361
- Dialling codes: 04356
- Vehicle registration: RD
- Website: www.amt-huettener- berge.de

Holzbunge is a municipality in the district of Rendsburg-Eckernförde, in Schleswig-Holstein, Germany.
