= Haby, Schleswig-Holstein =

- Municipality
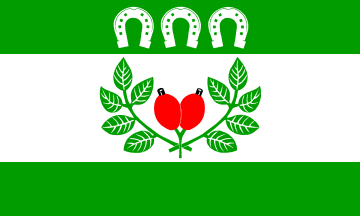
- Flag Coat of arms

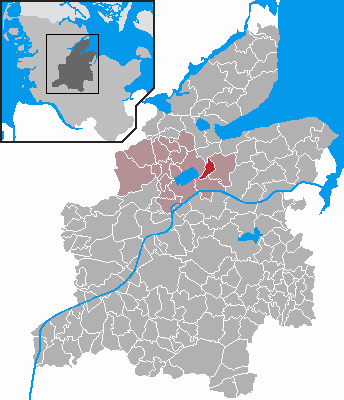
- Location of Haby, Schleswig-Holstein within Rendsburg-Eckernförde district
- Interactive map of Haby, Schleswig-Holstein
- Location within Germany Location within Schleswig-Holstein
- Coordinates: 54°23′56″N 9°49′9″E
- Country: Germany
- State: Schleswig-Holstein
- District: Rendsburg-Eckernförde
- Municipal assoc.: Hüttener Berge

Government
  - Mayor: Gesche Clasen (SPD)

Area
  - Total: 5.79 km^{2} (2.24 sq mi)
- Elevation: 16 m (52 ft)

Population (2025-12-31)
  - Total: 552
  - Density: 95.3/km^{2} (247/sq mi)
- Time zone: UTC+01:00 (CET)
  - Summer (DST): UTC+02:00 (CEST)
- Postal codes: 24361
- Dialling codes: 04356
- Vehicle registration: RD
- Website: www.amt-huettener- berge.de

Haby is a municipality in the district of Rendsburg-Eckernförde, in Schleswig-Holstein, Germany.

At the southwestern end of the village of Haby the meadows are filled with fog some nights. This is where there was, until the middle of the 20th century, a big lake which was linked to the Wittensee. For a thousand years it was used by people living in this area as a fishing ground till the growing agricultural industry caused the lake to vanish. Haby was mentioned in records first 800 years ago. The ending "by" indicates Viking origins. Haby is the most southern location in Germany with the "by" ending. There is another village with an almost identical name in southern Sweden.
