= Bistensee =

- Village of Ahlefeld-Bistensee
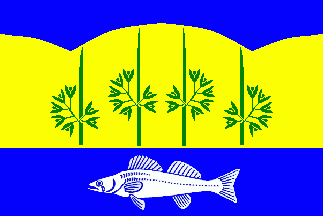
- Flag Coat of arms

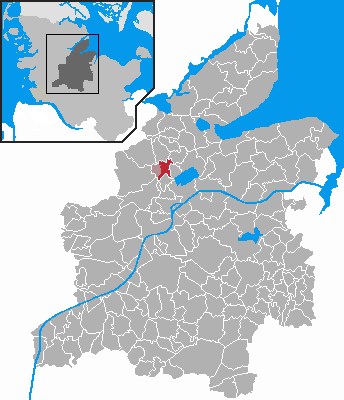
- Location of Bistensee within Rendsburg-Eckernförde
- Interactive map of Bistensee
- Location within Germany Location within Schleswig-Holstein
- Coordinates: 54°24′2″N 9°41′57″E
- Country: Germany
- State: Schleswig-Holstein
- District: Rendsburg-Eckernförde
- Town: Ahlefeld-Bistensee

Area
  - Total: 5.87 km^{2} (2.27 sq mi)
- Elevation: 15 m (49 ft)

Population (2006-12-31)
  - Total: 276
  - Density: 47.0/km^{2} (122/sq mi)
- Time zone: UTC+01:00 (CET)
  - Summer (DST): UTC+02:00 (CEST)
- Postal codes: 24358
- Dialling codes: 04353
- Vehicle registration: RD

Bistensee is a former municipality in the district of Rendsburg-Eckernförde, in Schleswig-Holstein, Germany. On 1 March 2008, it was merged with Ahlefeld to form the municipality Ahlefeld-Bistensee.
