= Groß Wittensee =

- Municipality
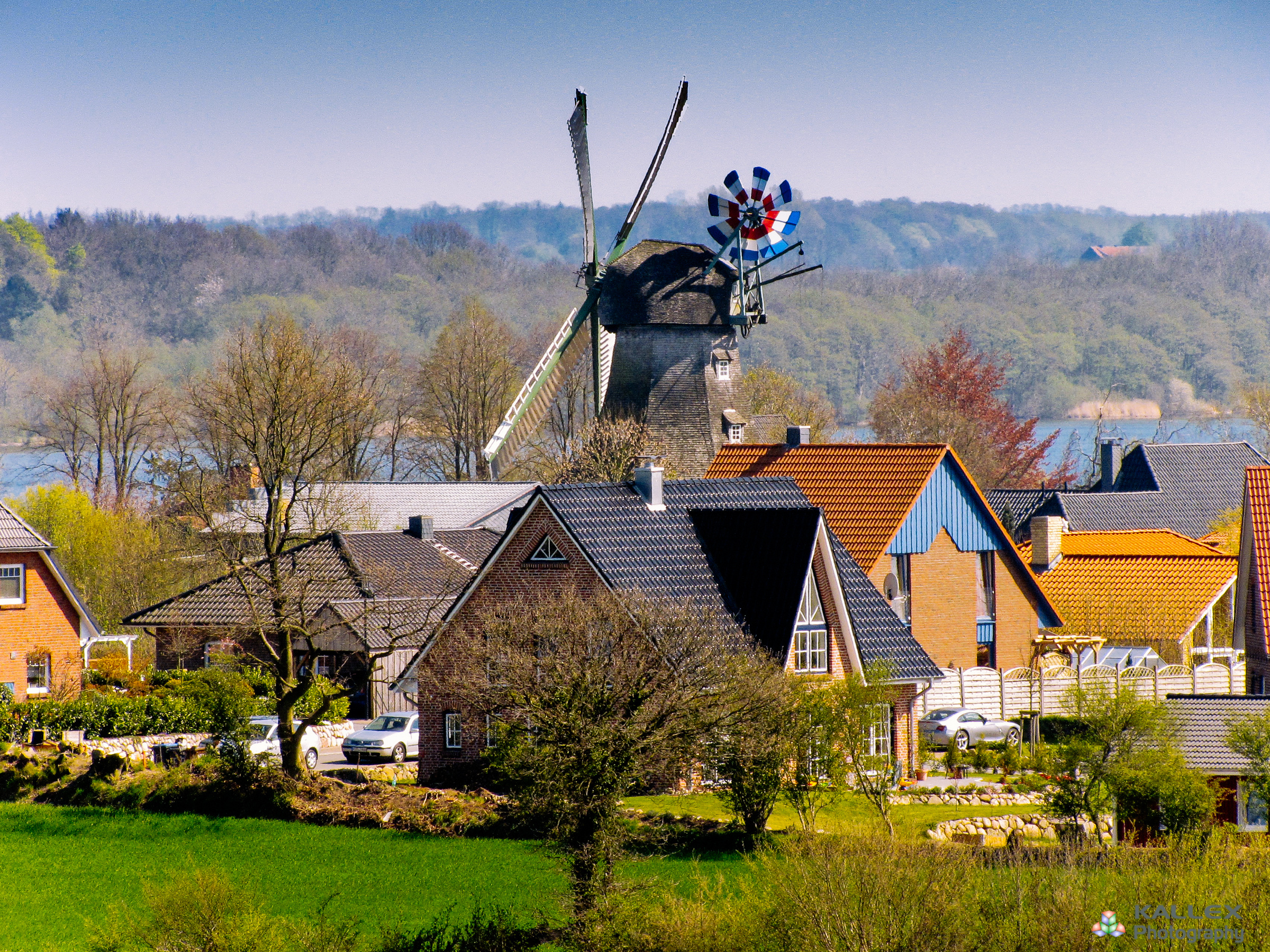
- Mill in Groß Wittensee

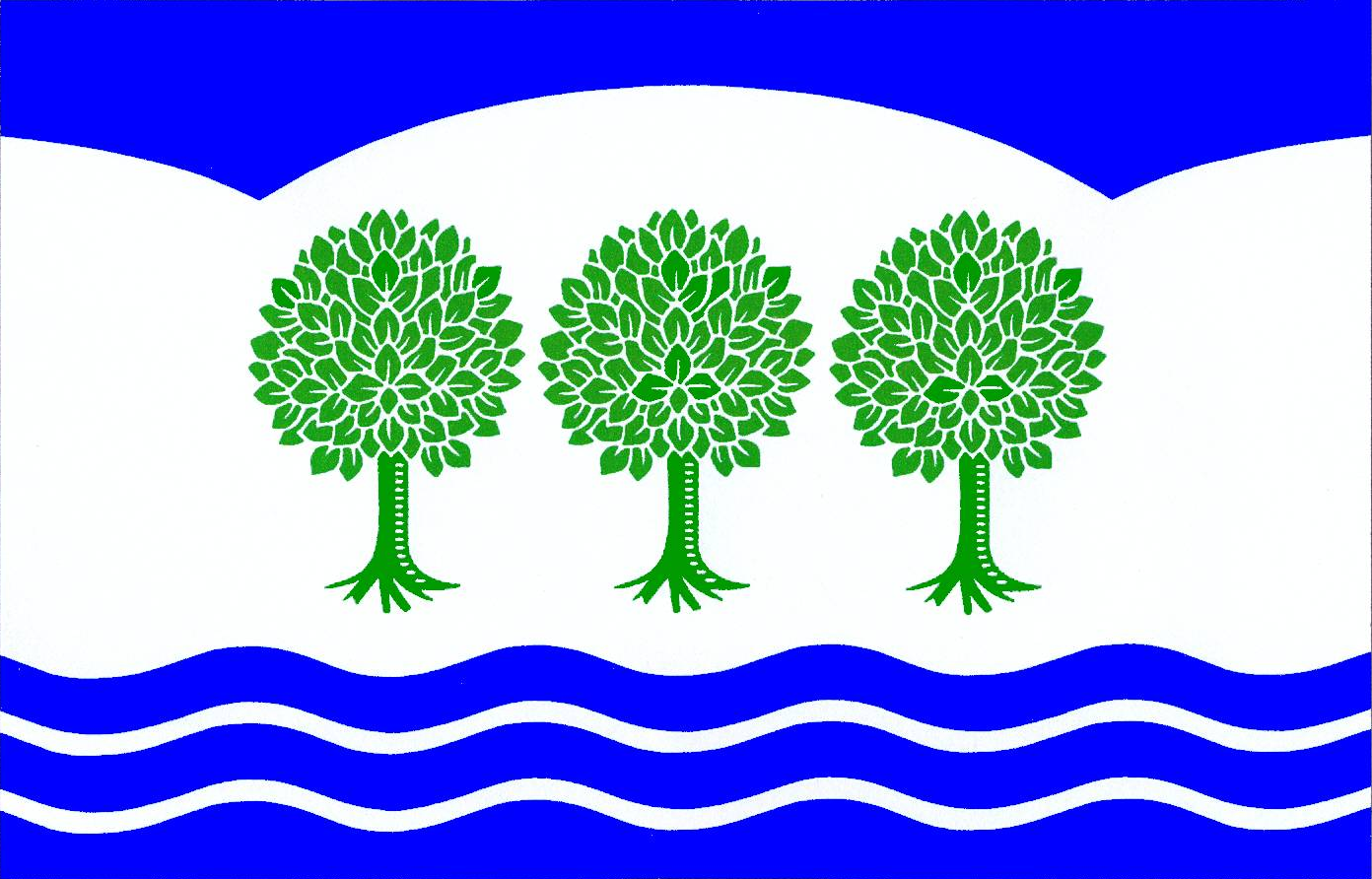
- Flag Coat of arms

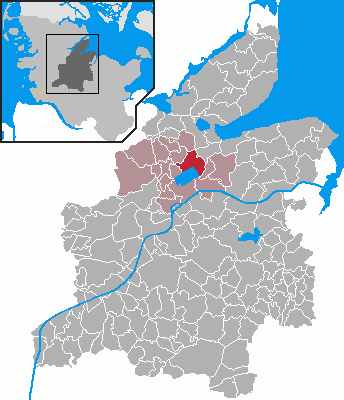
- Location of Groß Wittensee within Rendsburg-Eckernförde district
- Interactive map of Groß Wittensee
- Location within Germany Location within Schleswig-Holstein
- Coordinates: 54°24′23″N 9°46′18″E
- Country: Germany
- State: Schleswig-Holstein
- District: Rendsburg-Eckernförde
- Municipal assoc.: Hüttener Berge

Government
  - Mayor: Volker Walther

Area
  - Total: 23.61 km^{2} (9.12 sq mi)
- Elevation: 10 m (33 ft)

Population (2025-12-31)
  - Total: 1,357
  - Density: 57.48/km^{2} (148.9/sq mi)
- Time zone: UTC+01:00 (CET)
  - Summer (DST): UTC+02:00 (CEST)
- Postal codes: 24361
- Dialling codes: 04356
- Vehicle registration: RD
- Website: http://www.gross-wittensee.de/

Groß Wittensee is a municipality in the district of Rendsburg-Eckernförde, in Schleswig-Holstein, Germany.
