= Molfsee (Amt) =

Former Amt in Rendsburg-Eckernförde, Schleswig-Holstein, Germany

Coordinates: 54.250°N 10.017°E

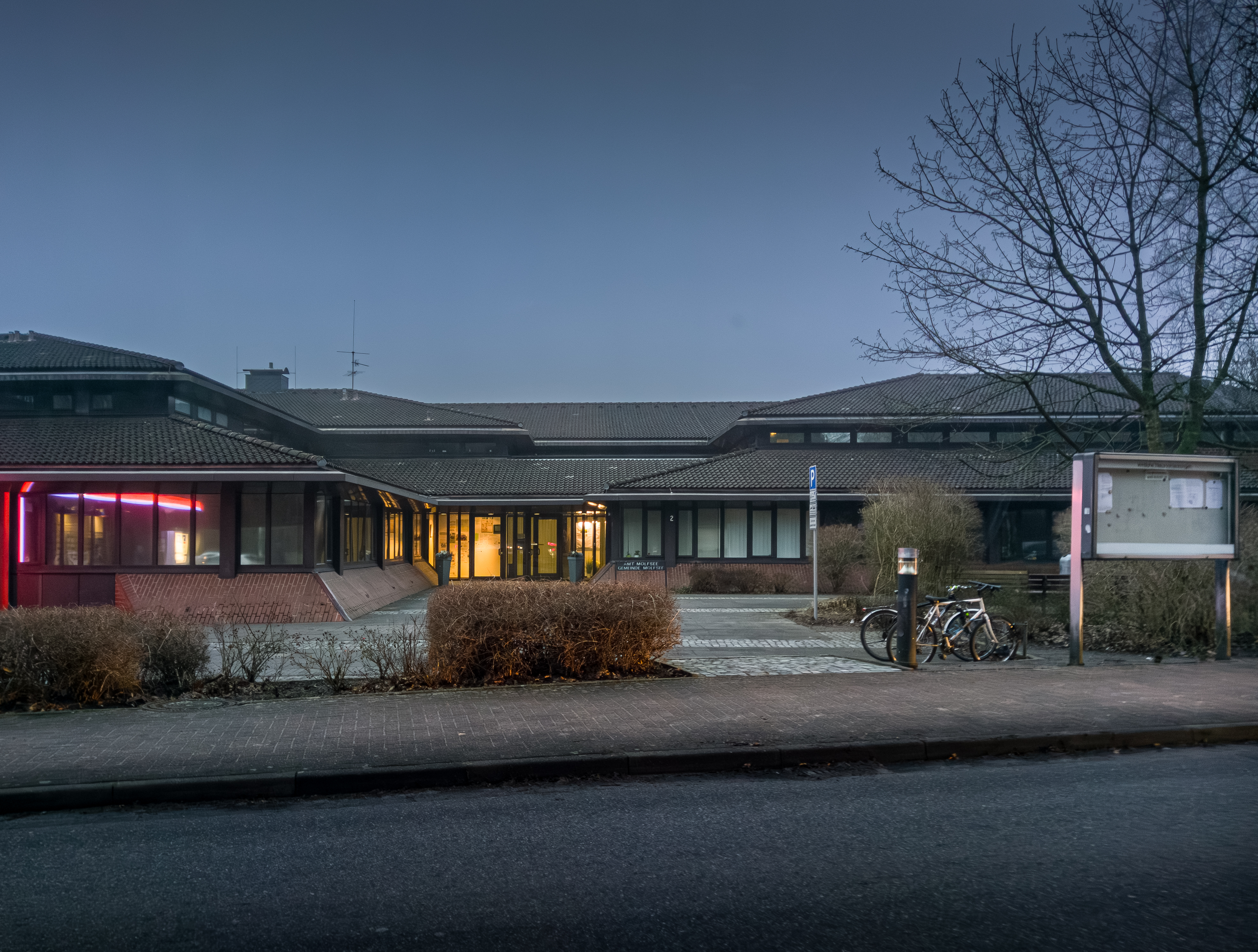
Amt Molfsee

Molfsee is a former Amt ("collective municipality") in the district of Rendsburg-Eckernförde, in Schleswig-Holstein, Germany. The seat of the Amt was in Molfsee. In June 2023 it was merged into the new Amt Eidertal.

The Amt Molfsee consists of the following municipalities:

1. Blumenthal
2. Mielkendorf
3. Molfsee
4. Rodenbek
5. Rumohr
6. Schierensee
