= Flintbek (Amt) =

- Amt
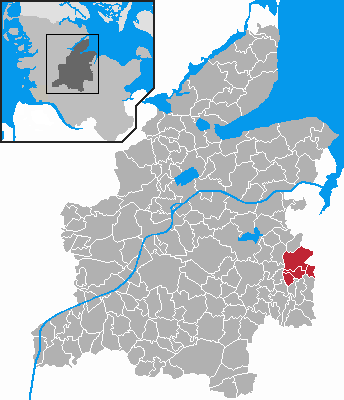
- Map of Rendsburg-Eckernförde highlighting Flintbek
- Interactive map of Flintbek
- Location within Germany Location within Schleswig-Holstein
- Coordinates: 54°15′N 10°04′E
- Country: Germany
- State: Schleswig-Holstein
- District: Rendsburg-Eckernförde
- Disbanded: 2023
- Subdivisions: 4 municipalities

Area
  - Total: 30.75 km^{2} (11.87 sq mi)

Population (2020-12-31)
  - Total: 7,991
  - Density: 259.9/km^{2} (673.1/sq mi)
- Time zone: UTC+01:00 (CET)
  - Summer (DST): UTC+02:00 (CEST)
- Website: www.flintbek.de

Flintbek is a former Amt ("collective municipality") in the district of Rendsburg-Eckernförde, in Schleswig-Holstein, Germany. In June 2023 it was merged into the new Amt Eidertal. The seat of the Amt was in Flintbek.

The Amt Flintbek consisted of the following municipalities:

1. Böhnhusen
2. Flintbek
3. Schönhorst
4. Techelsdorf
