= Bundesautobahn 215 =

Federal motorway in Germany

A 215
- Bundesautobahn 215
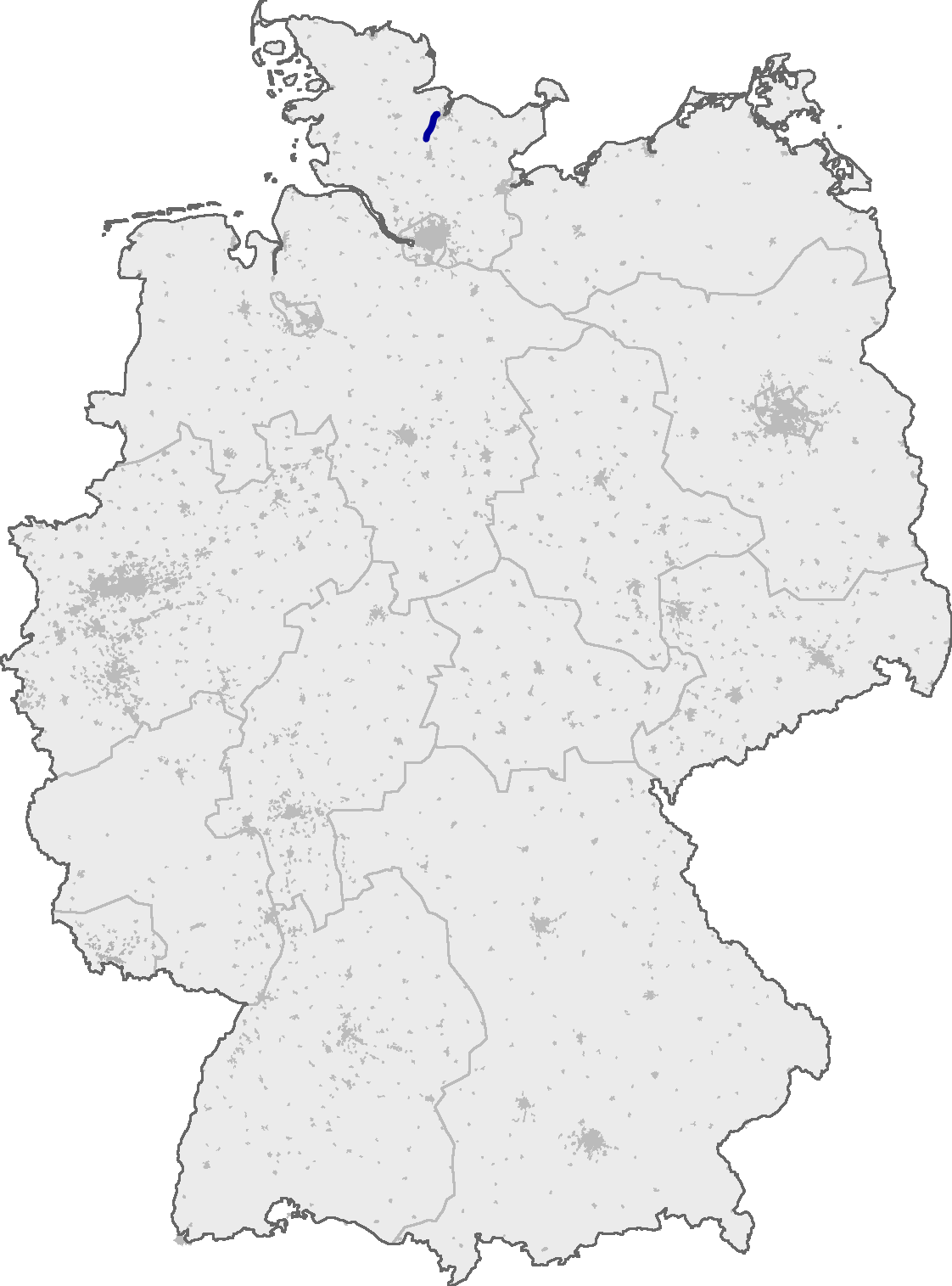

Route information
- Length: 23 km (14 mi)

Major junctions
- North end: B 76 in Kiel
- South end: A 7 in Bordesholm

Location
- Country: Germany
- States: Schleswig-Holstein

Highway system
- Roads in Germany; Autobahns; List; Federal; List; State; E-roads

Bundesautobahn 215 (translates from German as Federal Motorway 215, short form Autobahn 215, abbreviated as BAB 215 or A 215) is an autobahn that connects the federal state capital of Kiel to Hamburg via Autobahn 7. This route serves to further ease the ground transportation route from Kiel to the rest of Holstein and into central Europe.

== Exit list ==
State	District	Location	km	mi	Exit	Name	Destinations	Notes
Schleswig-Holstein	Kiel	Südfriedhof	22.9	14.2	1	Kiel-Westring	Westring – Kliniken, Universität, CITTI-Park, IKEA; Schützenwall – Zentrum, Wunderino Arena, Fähren	intersection with local roads Northern endpoint of motorway
Schleswig-Holstein	Kiel	Südfriedhof	22.4	13.9	2	Kiel-Mitte	B 76 – Eckernförde, Olympiazentrum, Universität, CITTI-Park; B 76 – Lübeck, Norwegenkai, Ostuferhafen	incomplete junction: no exit ramp: Kiel-Zentrum → Lübeck
Schleswig-Holstein	Kiel	Russee	19.2	11.9	3	Kiel-West interchange	A 210 – Flensburg, Rendsburg, Kiel-Mettenhof	modified cloverleaf interchange
Schleswig-Holstein	Rendsburg-Eckernförde	Mielkendorf	16.9	10.5	Bridge	river crossing	Eider river	
Schleswig-Holstein	Rendsburg-Eckernförde	Rumohr	11.9	7.4	Rest area	Rumohr	Rumohrr rest area	
Schleswig-Holstein	Rendsburg-Eckernförde	Blumenthal	9.5	5.9	4	Blumenthal	Blumenthal, Nortorf, Bordesholm	
Schleswig-Holstein	Rendsburg-Eckernförde	Schönbek	0.0	0.0	5	Bordesholm interchange	A 7 / E45 – Flensburg, Bordesholm, Hamburg, Neumünster-Nord	incomplete 3-way interchange no ramps between Kiel and Flensburg
1.000 mi = 1.609 km; 1.000 km = 0.621 mi: Incomplete access
