= Harald Genzmer =

German composer (1909–2007)

- Harald Genzmer, 1980
- Born: 9 February 1909; Blumenthal, German Empire
- Died: 16 December 2007 (aged 98); Munich, Germany
- Education: Hochschule für Musik Berlin
- Occupations: Composer; Academic
- Organizations: Musikhochschule Freiburg

Olympic medal record

Art competitions
| Bronze medal – third place | 1936 Berlin | Solo and chorus |

Harald Genzmer (9 February 1909 – 16 December 2007) was a German composer of classical music and an academic.

== Biography ==
The son of the legal historian Felix Genzmer, Genzmer was born in Blumenthal, near Kiel, Germany. He studied composition with Paul Hindemith at the Hochschule für Musik Berlin beginning in 1928.

From 1938 he taught at the Volksmusikschule Berlin-Neukölln. During the early part of the Second World War he served as a military band clarinetist. When his pianistic abilities were noticed by the Musikmeister, he was put on detached duties as a pianist/accompanist for "Lazarettenkonzerte", concerts for recuperating wounded officers. He was based for some time near Garmisch-Partenkirchen, where he made the acquaintance of Richard Strauss. When the war ended, he was offered a post at the Musikhochschule München. This was blocked by the American authorities and so, from 1946 to 1957 he taught at the Musikhochschule in Freiburg im Breisgau.

From 1957 to 1974 he taught at the Musikhochschule München. He hung a framed review from the Süddeutsche Zeitung above his piano, which stated after the premiere of his 1955 Sinfonietta for Strings that it was a work destined only for oblivion. Sharing the frame was a cutting from a few years later, reporting that in the previous year it had been the most performed work for string orchestra in Europe.

Among his notable students are Bertold Hummel, Egyptian composer Gamal Abdel-Rahim, British composer John McCabe, and Japanese composer Toyoko Takami. See: List of music students by teacher: G to J#Harald Genzmer.

He died on 16 December 2007 in Munich.

== Awards ==
- 1960 Music Prize of the Bayerische Akademie der Schönen Künste
- 1961 1st Prize of the Deutscher Sängerbund
- 1962 Preis zur Förderung der Musik der Stadt München
- 1991 Bavarian Maximilian Order for Science and Art
- 1996 Kulturpreis der Bayerischen Landesstiftung
- 1998 Bayerische Verfassungsmedaille in Gold

== Compositions ==
=== Orchestral works ===
- 1940 Konzert Nr. 1 für Trautonium und Orchester
- 1942 Musik für Streichorchester
- 1946 Erstes Concertino, for piano and strings with flute
- 1948 Konzert für Klavier und Orchester
- 1950 Konzert für Violoncello und großes Orchester
- 1952 Konzert Nr. 2 für Mixtur-Trautonium und Orchester
- 1954 Konzert für Flöte und Orchester
- 1955 Sinfonietta, for strings
- 1957 rev.1970 1. Sinfonie, for full orchestra
- 1957 Kammerkonzert, for oboe and string orchestra.
- 1958 2. Sinfonie, for strings
- 1959 Prolog, for orchestra
- 1959 Konzert für Violine und Orchester.
- 1960 Divertimento giocoso for two woodwind instruments and string orchestra
- 1963 Concertino Nr. 2, for piano and strings
- 1963 2. Orchesterkonzert
- 1964 Introduktion und Adagio, for strings
- 1965 Der Zauberspiegel, ballet-suite for orchestra
- 1965 Concerto for harp and strings
- 1967 Concerto for viola and orchestra
- 1967 Sonatina prima, for strings
- 1970 Sinfonia da Camera
- 1970 Konzert, for organ and orchestra
- 1971 Sonatina seconda, for strings
- 1972 Elf Duette, for recorder
- 1974 3. Konzert, for piano and orchestra
- 1976 Miniaturen, for strings
- 1977–1978 Musik für Orchester, after a fragment by Friedrich Hölderlin
- 1978 Konzert, for percussion instruments and orchestra
- 1979 Sinfonia per giovani, for large school orchestra
- 1980 2. Konzert, for organ and strings
- 1983 Konzert, for two clarinets and strings
- 1984 Konzert, for four horns and orchestra
- 1984 Konzert, for cello, contrabass and strings
- 1985 Sechs Bagatellen for cello and contrabass Pub. Litolff/Peters Nr.8613
- 1985 Konzert, for trumpet and strings
- 1985 2. Konzert, for trumpet and strings
- 1986 3. Sinfonie
- 1987 Cassation, for strings
- 1990 Vierte Sinfonie, for large orchestra
- 1996 Concerto for contrabass and string orchestra
- 1998 Concertino für Flöte, Oboe (Flöte) und Streichorchester
- 1998 Concerto for three trumpets and string orchestra
- 1998 5. Sinfonie, for large orchestra
- 2002 3. Sinfonietta, for string orchestra
- 2. Sinfonietta, for string orchestra
- Concertino, for clarinet and chamber orchestra
- Erstes Concertino, for piano and string orchestra, with obbligato flute
- Festliches Vorspiel, for orchestra
- Kokua, dance suite for large orchestra
  1. Tarantella
  2. Burleske
  3. Kokoa
  4. Dytiramba
- Konzert, for two pianos and orchestra
- Konzert, for two guitars and orchestra
- Konzert, for flute, harp and strings
- Pachelbel-Suite, for orchestra
- Prolog II, for orchestra

=== Works for orchestra of wind-instruments ===
- 1968 Divertimento for symphonic wind ensemble
- 1969 Konzert, for cello and winds
- 1974 Ouvertüre für Uster
- Konzert, for trumpet, winds, harp and percussion
- Parergon zur "Sinfonia per giovani", for saxophone orchestra

=== Dramatic works ===
- 1965 Der Zauberspiegel, ballet – libretto: Hans Stadlmair

=== Liturgical music ===
- 1962 Jiménez-Kantate, for soprano, mixed chorus and orchestra
- 1969–1970 Mistral-Kantate, for soprano
- 1973 Deutsche Messe, for mixed chorus and organ
- 1975–1976 Oswald von Wolkenstein, cantata for soprano, baritone, mixed chorus and orchestra
- 1978 Kantate (The mystic trumpeter), for soprano (tenor), trumpet and strings
- 1979 Geistliche Kantate, for soprano solo, men's chorus, organ and percussion
- 1981 Kantate 1981 nach engl. Barockgedichten, for soprano, mixed chorus and orchestra
- Adventsmotette "Das Volk, das im Finstern wandelt"(Jesaja 9), for men's chorus and organ
- Hymne – zum Fest des St. Antonius von Padua "Der Geist Gottes, des Herrn, ruht auf mir", for men's chorus

=== Choral works ===
- Drei Chorlieder vom Wein, for men's chorus
- Lied des Vogelstellers "Der Vogel, der im Fluge ruht", for mixed chorus
- Tropus ad Gloria, for mixed chorus
- Wach auf, wach auf, for mixed chorus
- Zwei geistliche Festsprüche, for men's chorus and organ
  1. Lobet den Herrn, alle Heiden (Psalm 117)
  2. Lasset das Wort Christi

=== Vocal music ===
- 1961–1963 Fünf Lieder, on texts by Luís de Camões, for baritone and piano

=== Piano works ===
- 1938 1. Sonate.
- 1940 1. Sonatine.
- 1942 2. Sonate.
- 1943 Sonata in D, for piano four-hands
- 1948 Suite for piano
- 1959 3. Sonatine.
- 1960–1962 Préludes
- 1963 Dialoge
- 1965 Studien, for piano four-hands
- 1975 Konzert, for piano and percussion
- 1978 4 Elegien, for piano and percussion
- at least five piano sonatas (sonata 5 published in 1985)

=== Selected Organ works ===
- 1945 Tripartita in F GeWV 389
- 1952 Erste Sonate GeWV 390
- 1952 rev. 2000 Konzert (for organ solo) GeWV 391
- 1956 Zweite Sonate GeWV 392
- 1963 Dritte Sonate GeWV 393
- 1966 Adventskonzert GeWV 395
- 1968 Die Tageszeiten GeWV 396
- 1974 Weihnachtskonzert GeWV 398
- 1974 Konzert, for organ and percussion GeWV 417
- 1978 Pfingstkonzert GeWV 399
- 1980 Osterkonzert GeWV 400
- 1981 Fantasie GeWV 402
- 1980–1981 Impressionen
- 1994 Triptychon GeWV 408
- 1996–1997 Sinfonisches Konzert : no. 2 GeWV 409
- 2001–2003 Musik der Trauer GeWV 412
- 2002 Präludium, Arie und Finale GeWV 413
- Lento misterioso II
- Sonata for trumpet and organ (published 1971) GeWV 416
- Sonata for cello and organ

=== Selected chamber works ===
- 1939 First Sonata for Flute and Piano
- 1941 Sonate für Altblockflöte und Klavier
- 1943 Violin Sonata No. 1
- 1945 Second Sonata (in E minor) for Flute and Piano
- 1947 Trio for flute, viola and harp
- 1949 Streichquartett Nr. 1
- 1949 Violin Sonata No. 2
- 1949 Scherzo für Mixtur-Trautonium und Klavier
- 1953 Sonatina for Violine and Piano No. 1
- 1954 Violin Sonata No. 3
- 1955 Second sonata for viola and piano
- 1957 Wind quintet
- 1957 Sonate für viola
- 1967 1. Sonatine für Violoncello und Klavier
- 1973 Sonatine für Viola und Klavier
- 1974 Quartett für Klarinette, Violine, Violoncello und Klavier
- ©1975 Zwölf Duos für zwei Posaunen
- 1978 Capriccio für Marimbaphon
- 1980 Violin Sonata No. 4
- 1981 Sonate für Violoncello Solo
- 1981 Sonatine für Kontrabaß und Klavier
- 1981 Divertimento für Violoncello und Fagott
- 1982 2. Sonatine für Violoncello und Klavier
- 1983 Acht Fantasien für Vibraphon
- 1983–1984, revised 1991 Sonate für violine solo
- 1986 Sonate für Gitarre
- 1988 Trio für Klarinette, Violoncello und Klavier
- 1990 Sonate für Flöte und Harfe
- 1992 Pan : für Querflöte solo oder Altquerflöte in G solo
- 1995 Quintet for Clarinet and Strings
- 1995 Violin Sonata No. 5
- 1995 Sonatina for Violin and Piano No. 2
- 1995 Sonatina for Violin and Piano No. 3
- 1997 Sonate für Klarinette (B♭) und Klavier
- 1999 Fantasie-Sonate: für Flöte und Gitarre
- 2002 Improvisationen für Altblockflöte solo
- Sonatas for cello and piano (first sonata published in 1954, another composed 1963)
- Suite of Dances for Electronic Instruments

== Sources ==
- Lukas, Victor. Reclams Orgelmusikfürer. Stuttgart: Philipp Reclam June 1992.
