= Molfsee =

- Municipality
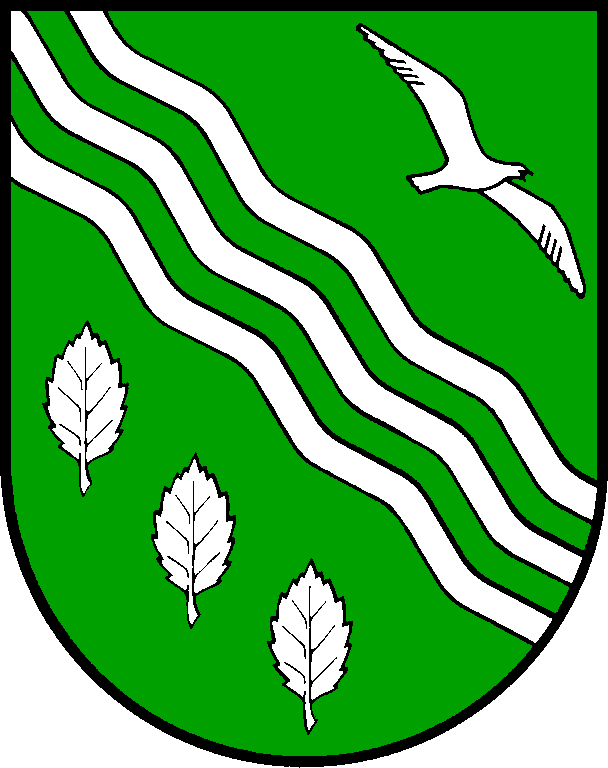
- Coat of arms

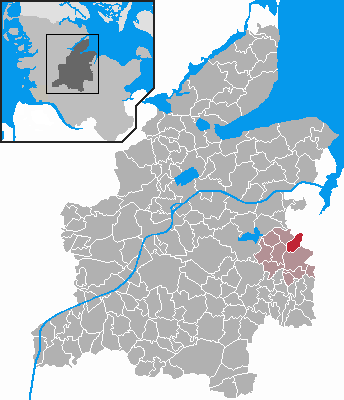
- Location of Molfsee within Rendsburg-Eckernförde district
- Interactive map of Molfsee
- Location within Germany Location within Schleswig-Holstein
- Coordinates: 54°15′51″N 10°3′56″E
- Country: Germany
- State: Schleswig-Holstein
- District: Rendsburg-Eckernförde
- Municipal assoc.: Eidertal

Government
  - Mayor: Timo Boss

Area
  - Total: 7.17 km^{2} (2.77 sq mi)
- Elevation: 24 m (79 ft)

Population (2025-12-31)
  - Total: 5,004
  - Density: 698/km^{2} (1,810/sq mi)
- Time zone: UTC+01:00 (CET)
  - Summer (DST): UTC+02:00 (CEST)
- Postal codes: 24113
- Dialling codes: 0431, 04347 (Molfsee Dorf)
- Vehicle registration: RD
- Website: www.amt-eidertal.de

Molfsee is a municipality in the district of Rendsburg-Eckernförde, in Schleswig-Holstein, Germany. It is situated on the river Eider, approx. 1 km southwest of Kiel.

Molfsee was the seat of the former Amt ("collective municipality") Molfsee.

In popular culture, Molfsee is also a song by electro-artist Ulrich Schnauss, along with Blumenthal.

Molfsee is known for its huge Open Air Museum called "Schleswig-Holsteinisches Freilichtmuseum" which opened in 1965. Over 70 regional historical houses can be visited. There are some attractions like a heritage railway and historical employed persons, for example smiths, basketmakers, potters and weavers. During the year there are special market places.

The earliest protest against Google Street View in Germany occurred in Molfsee in 2008; growing nationwide opposition against Street View coverage led to Germany not being widely photographed until 2023.

== Images ==
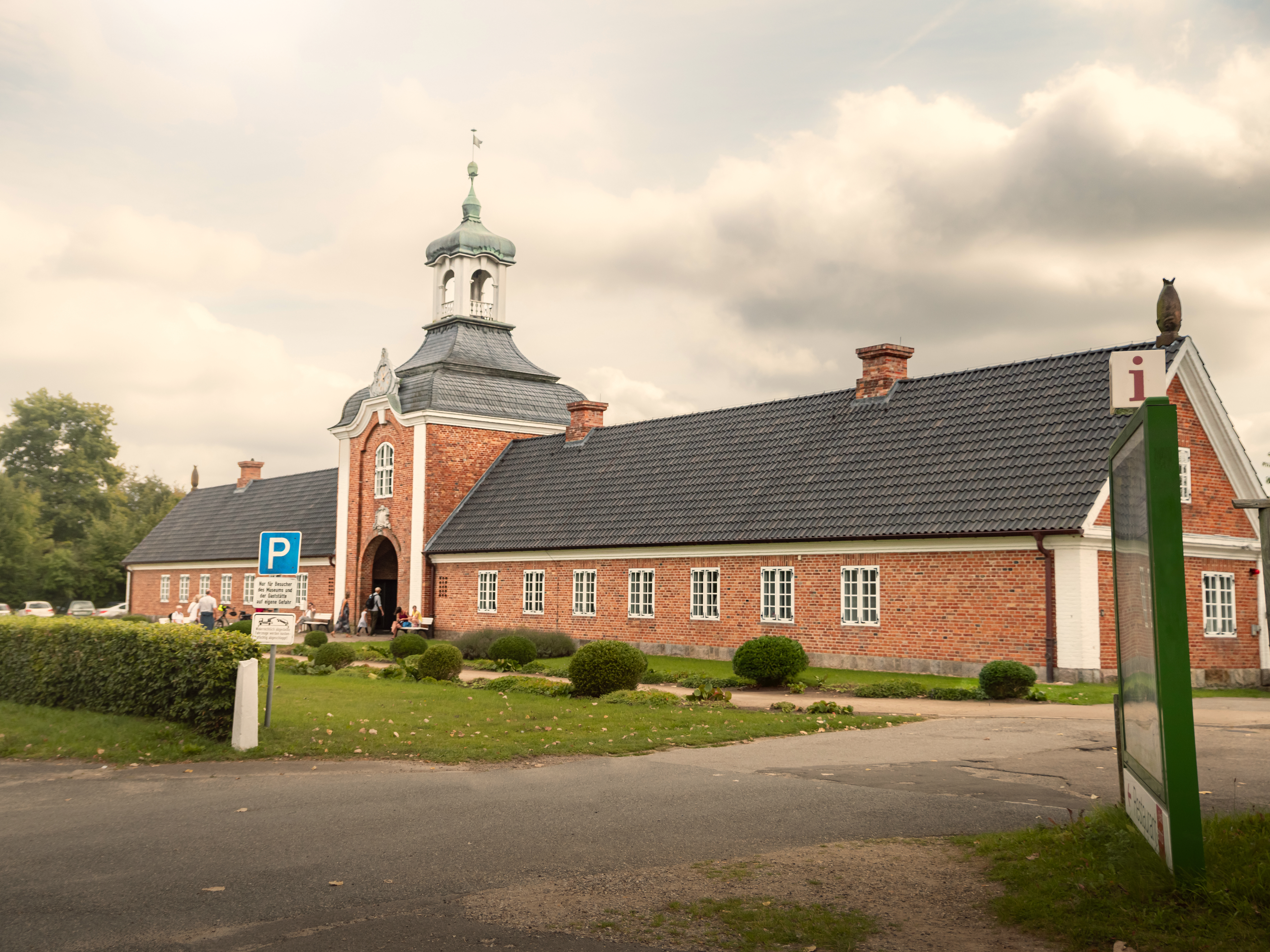
Gatehouse of the open-air museum in Molfsee

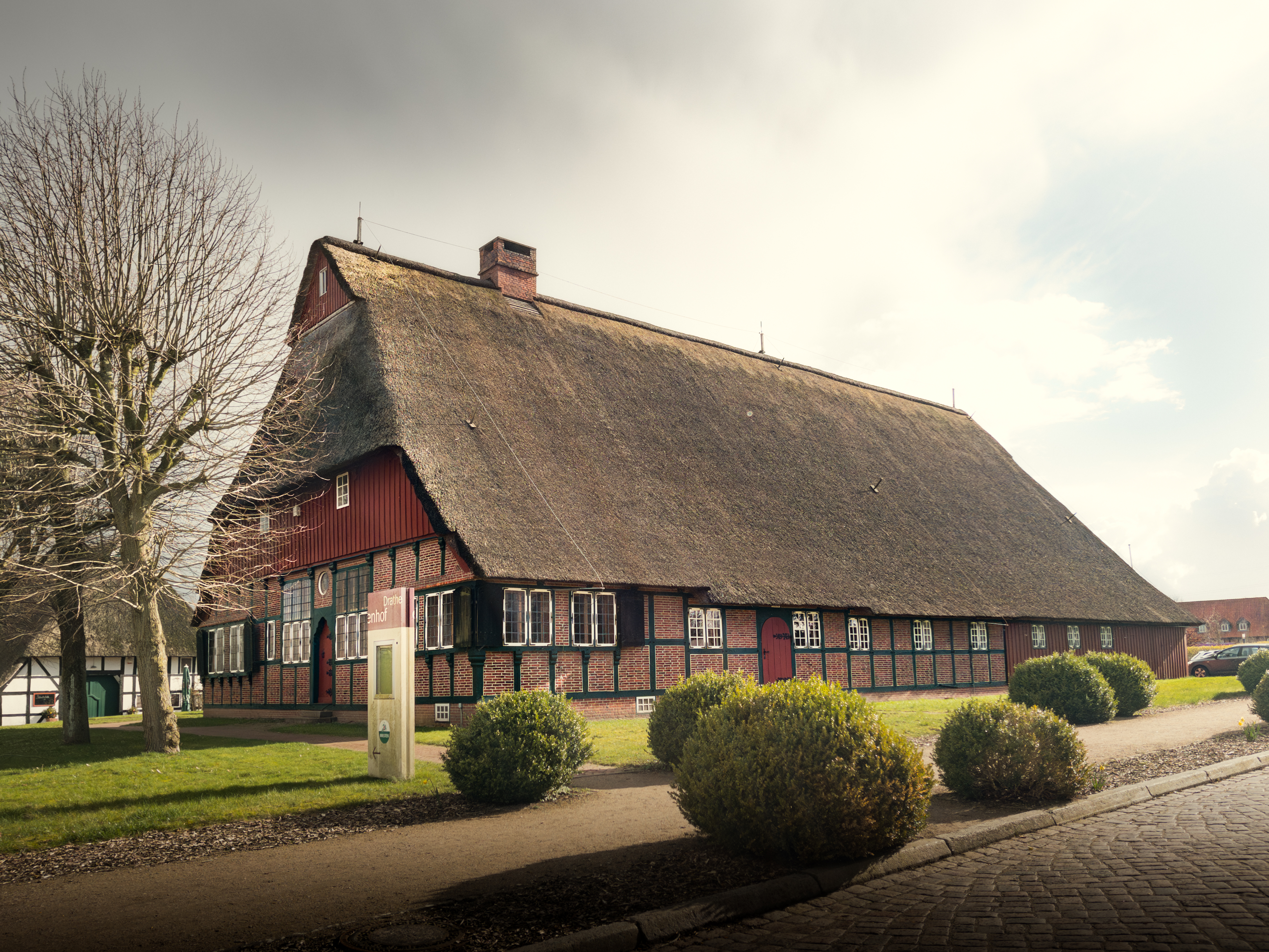
Drathenhof, Restaurant

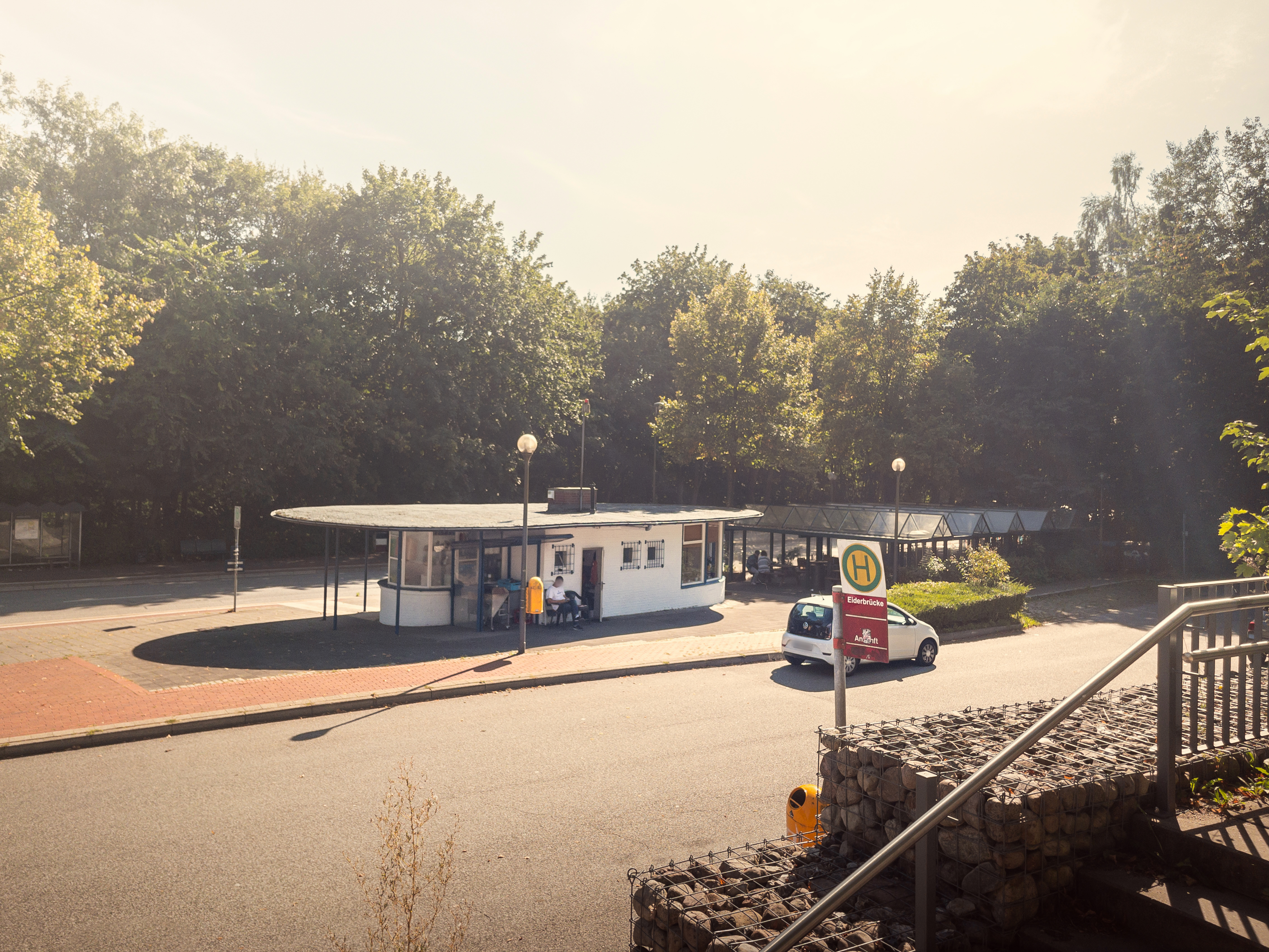
Bus stop Eiderbrücke

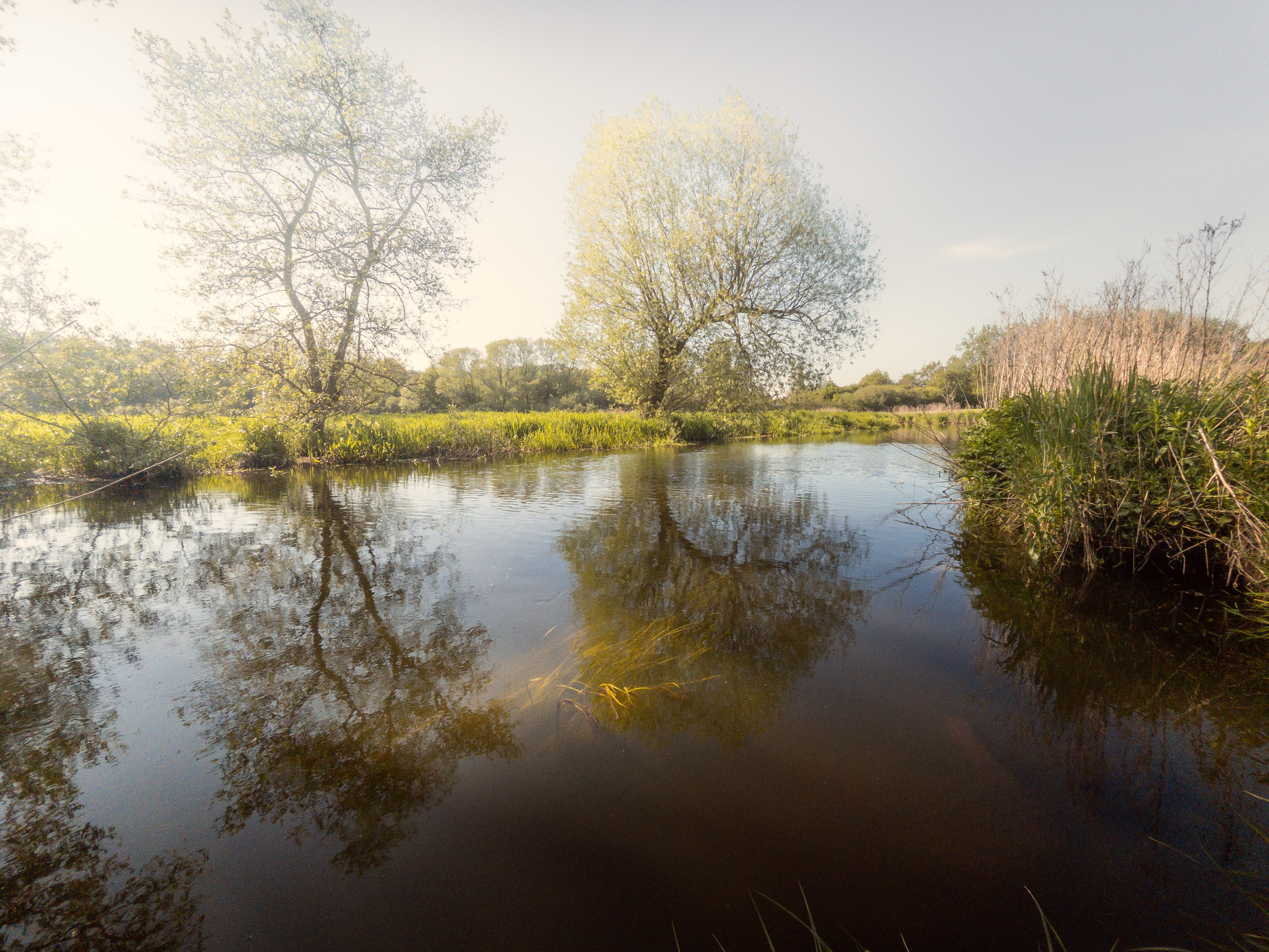
The Eider

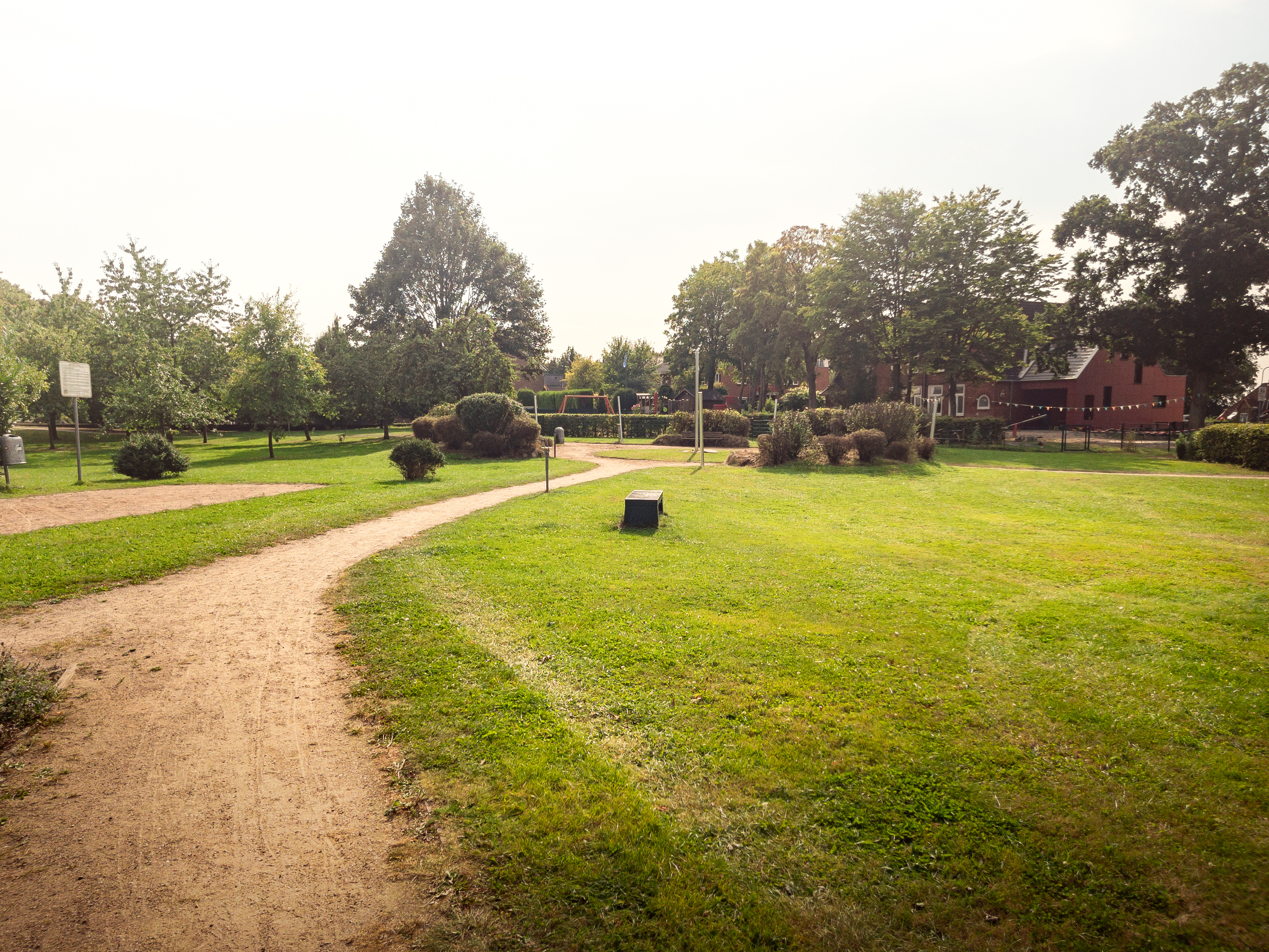
Dorfanger, Molfsee

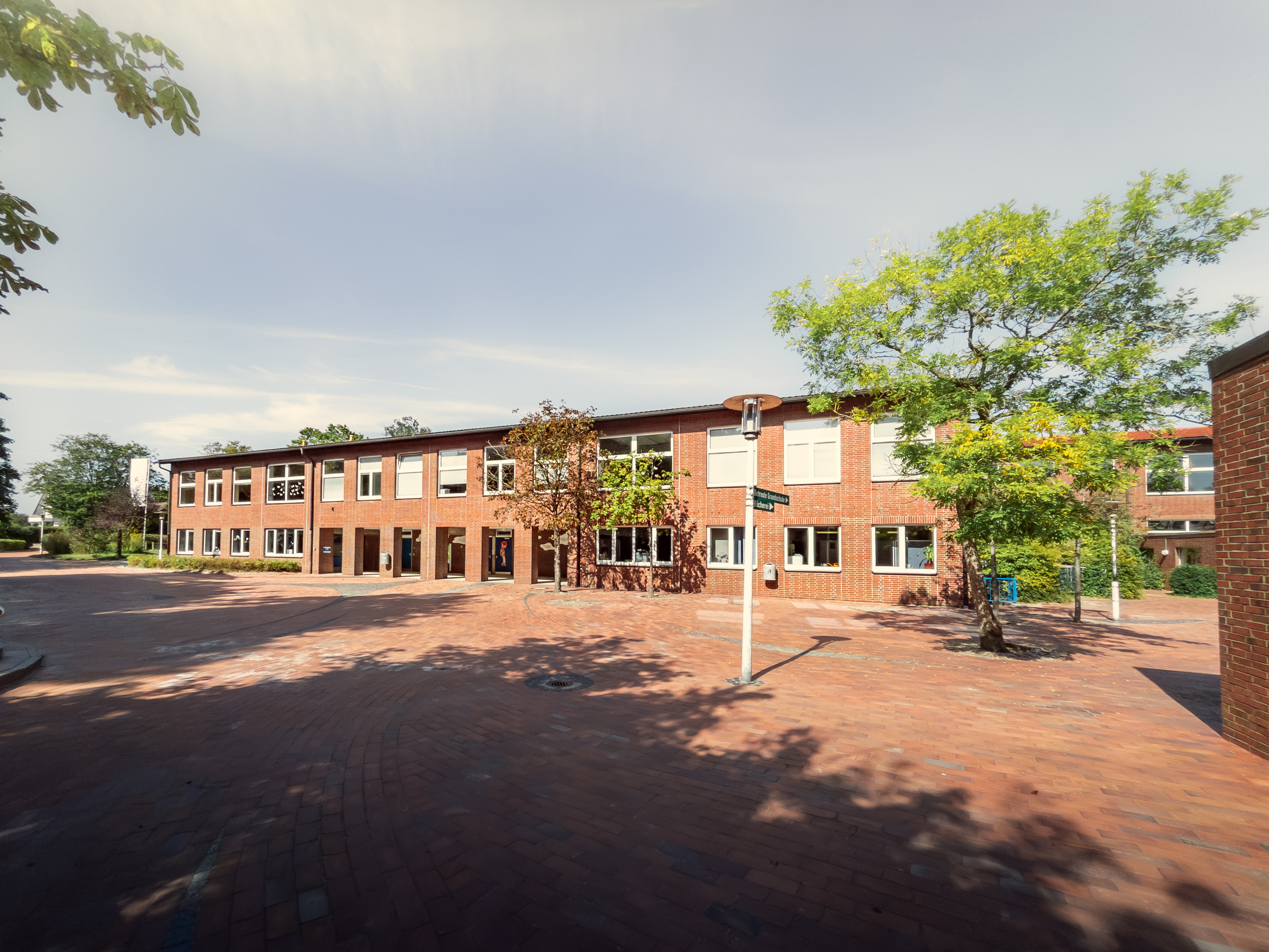
Grundschule Eidertal (Primary school)

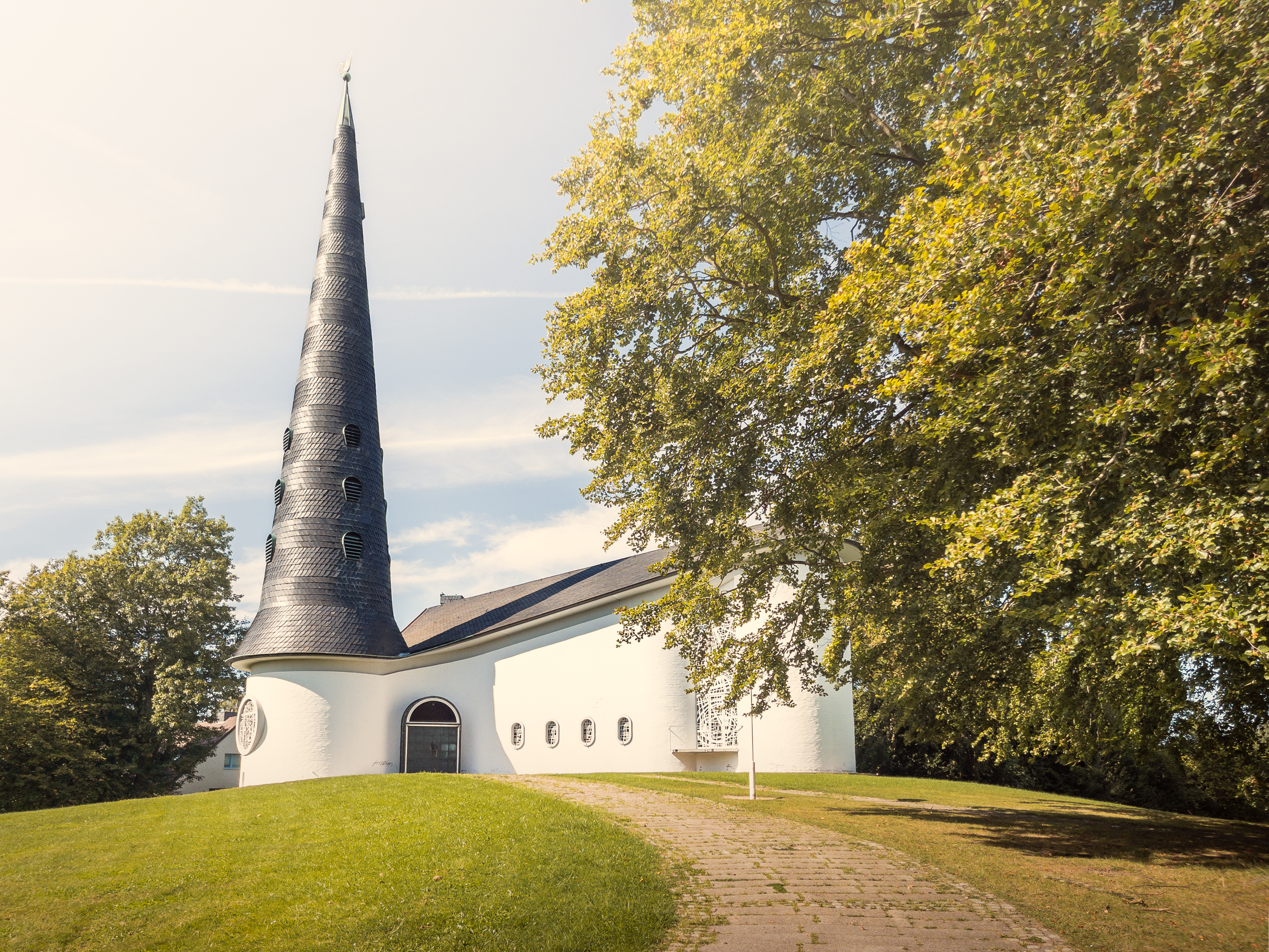
Thomaskirche (Church)

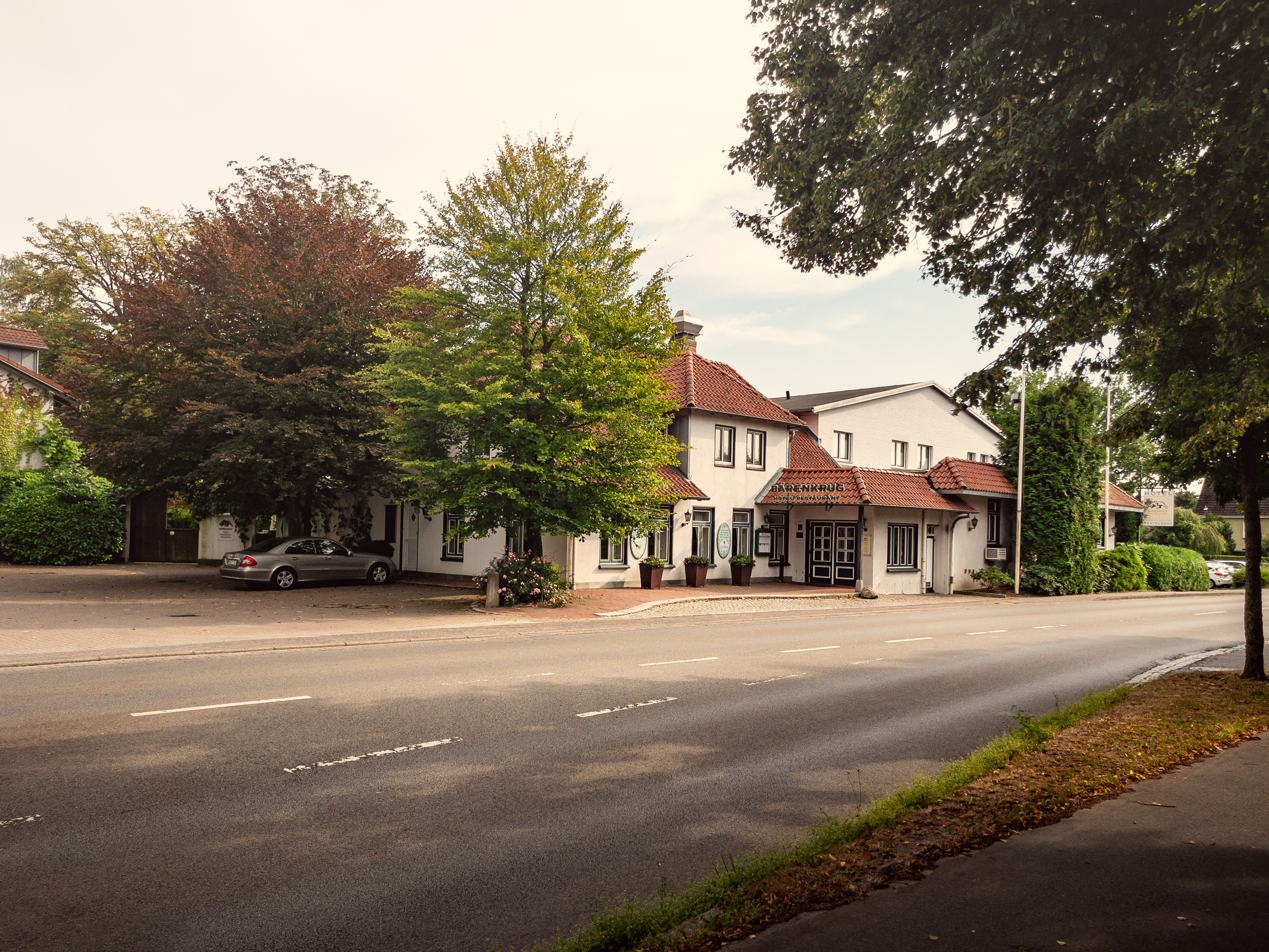
Bärenkrug, Hotel & Restaurant

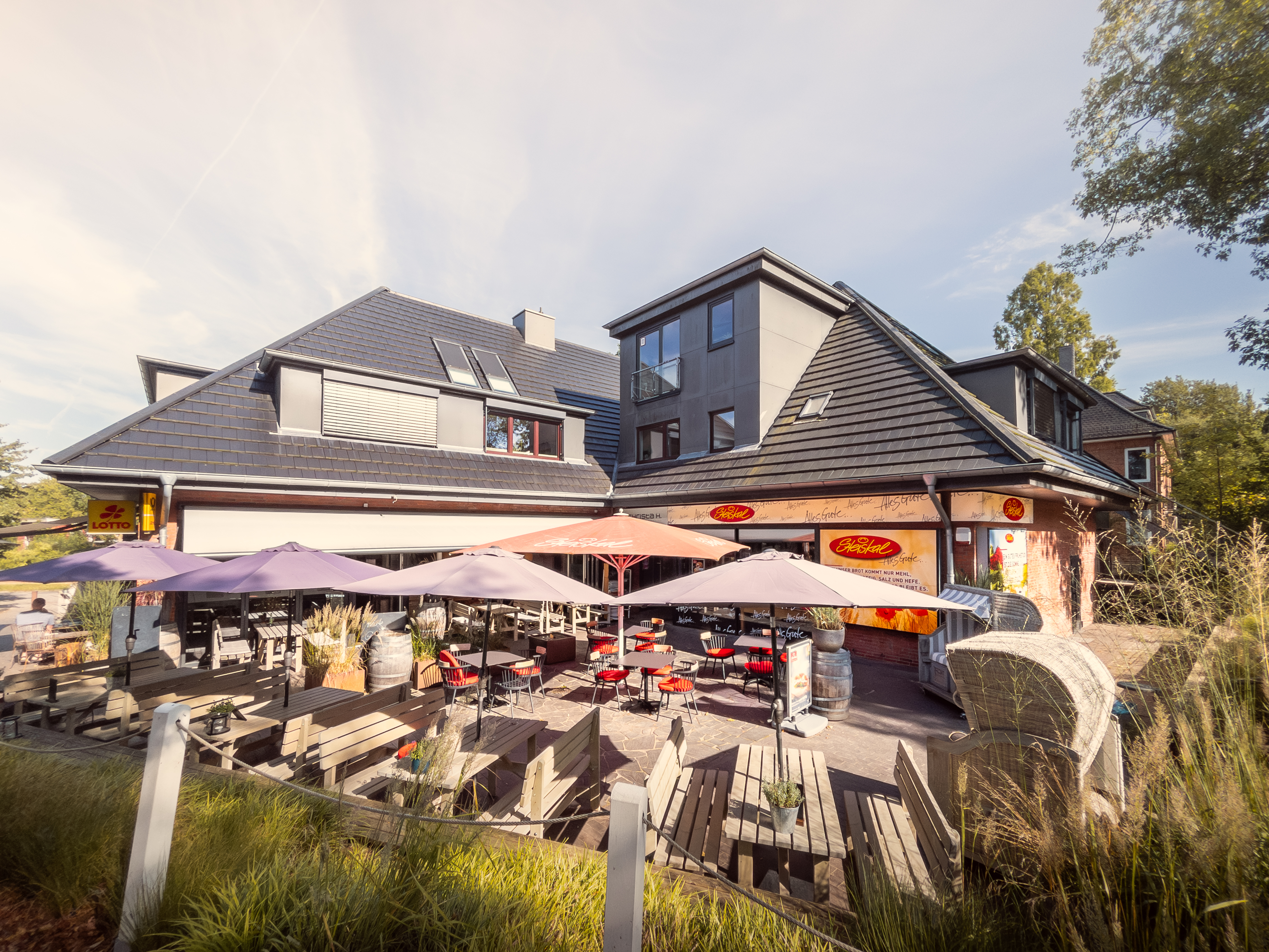
Eschenbrook 2

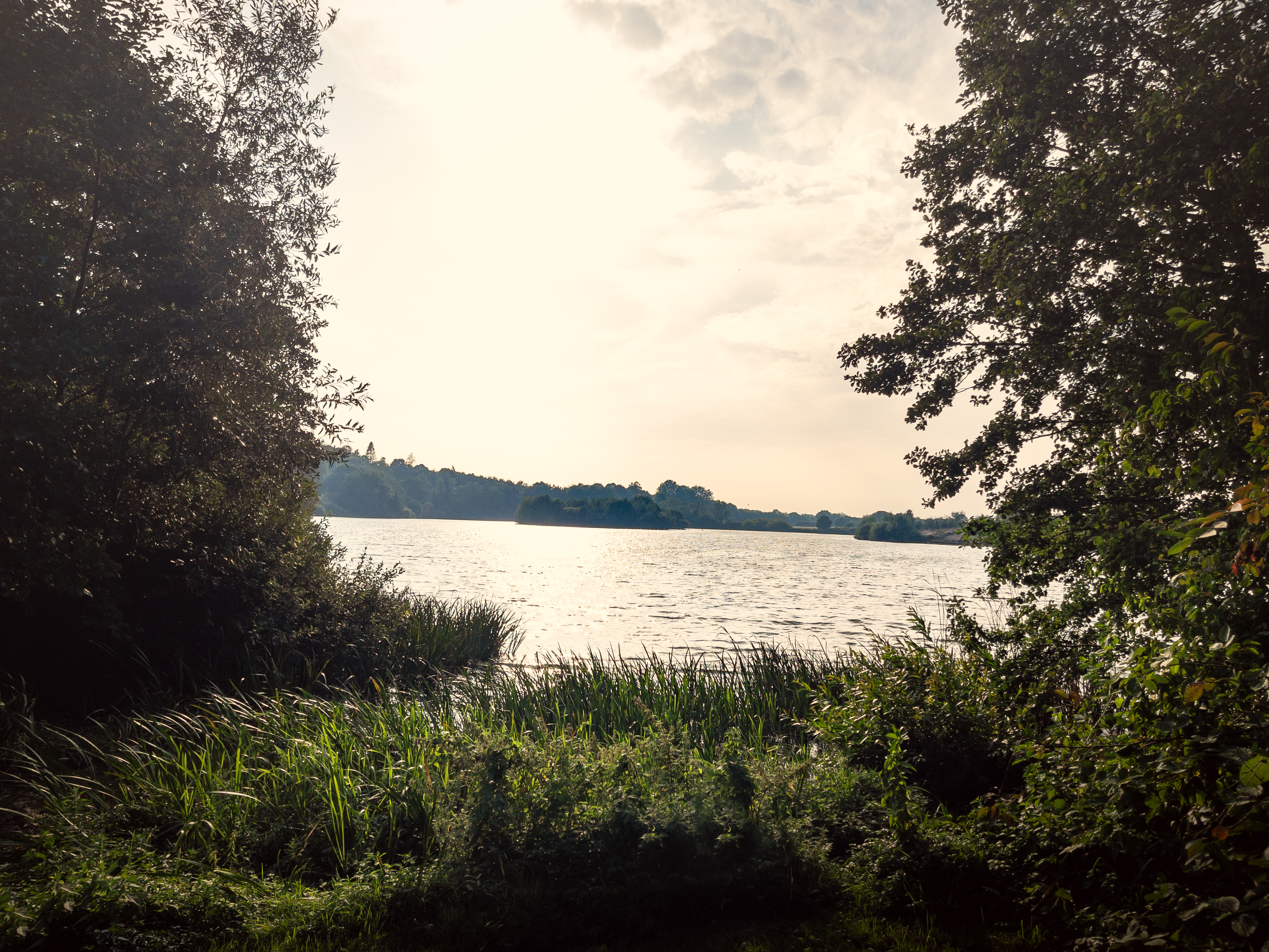
The Molfsee

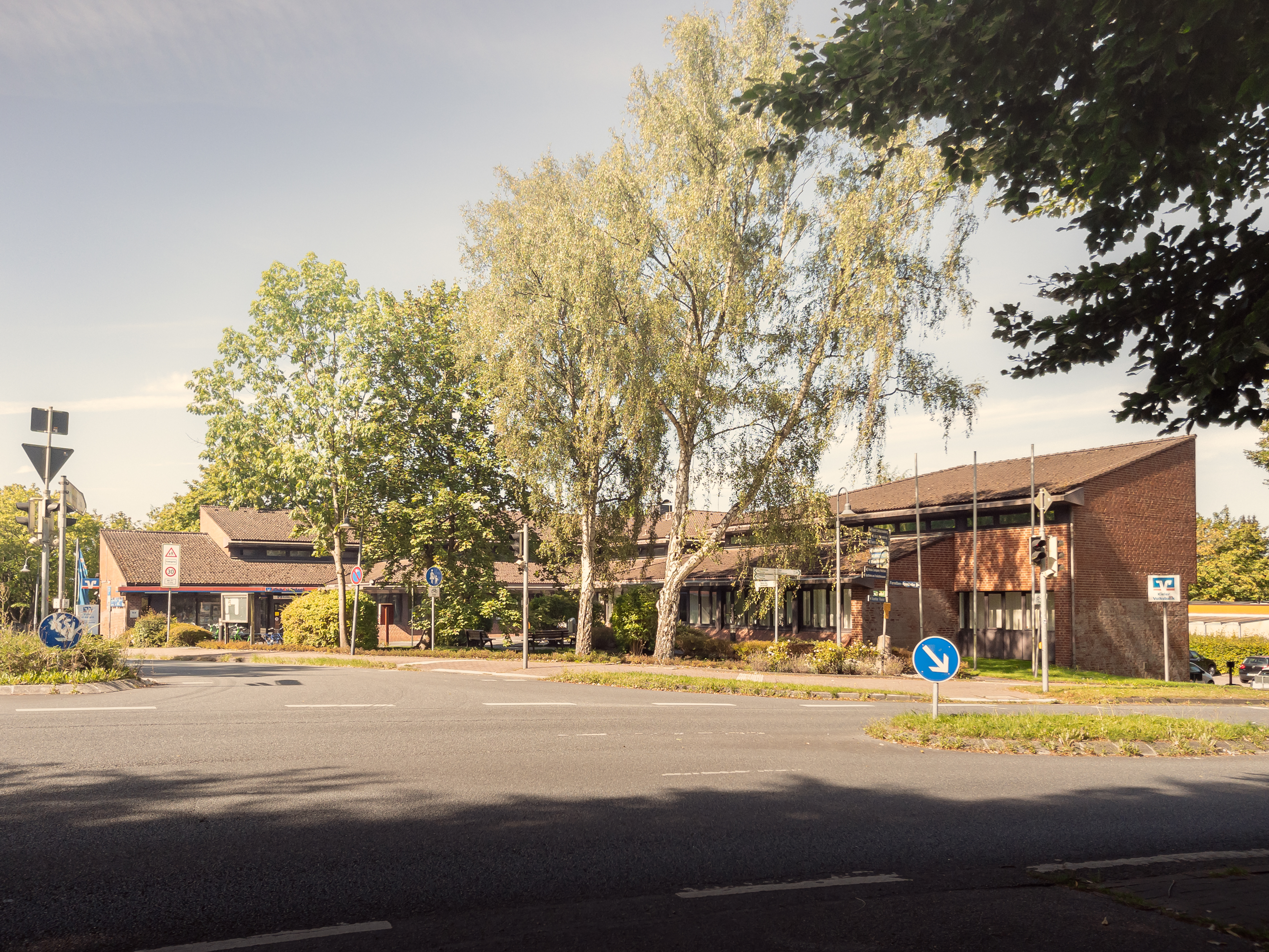
Amt Molfsee ("collective municipality")

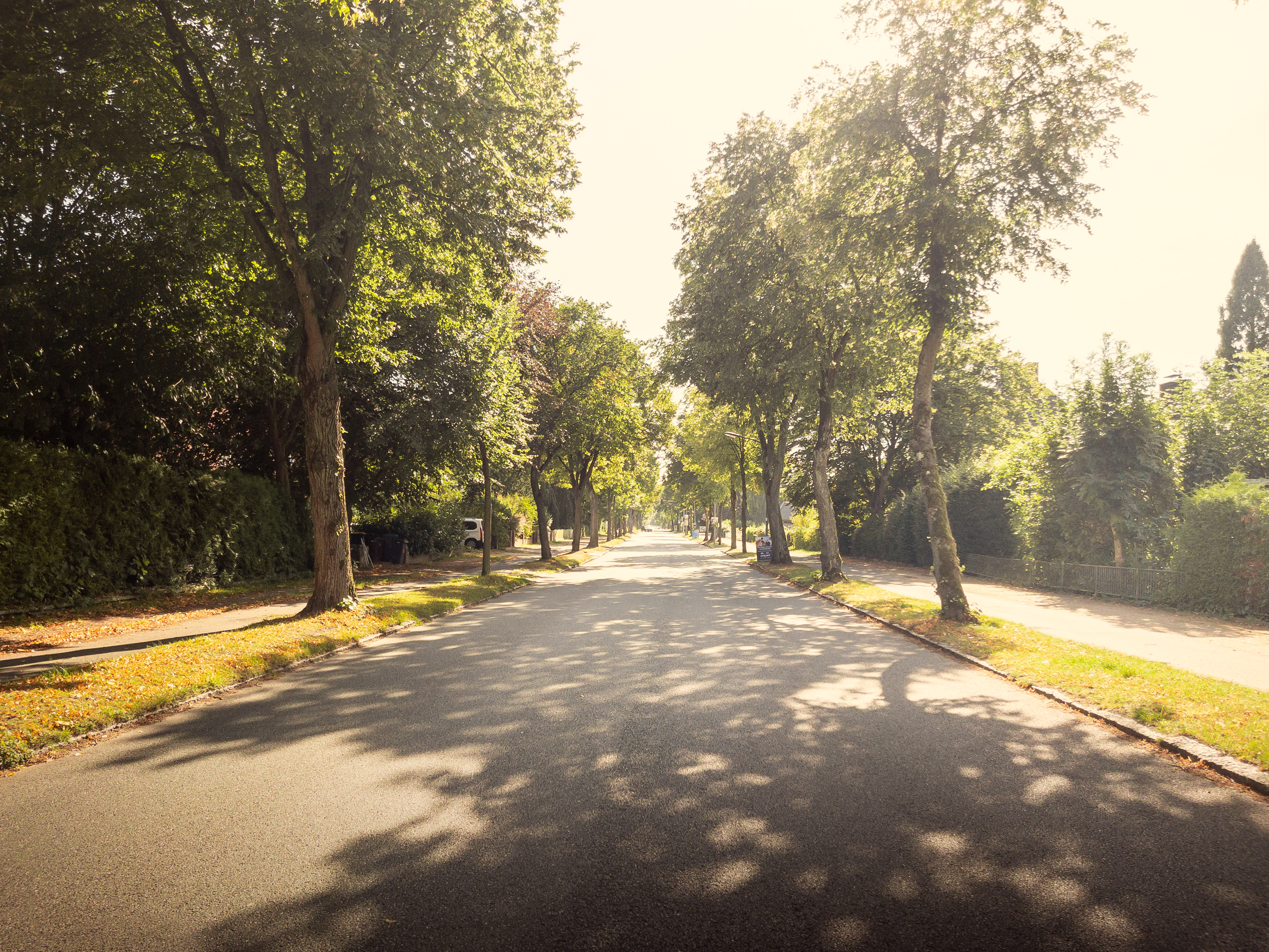
Hamburger Landstraße (main street)

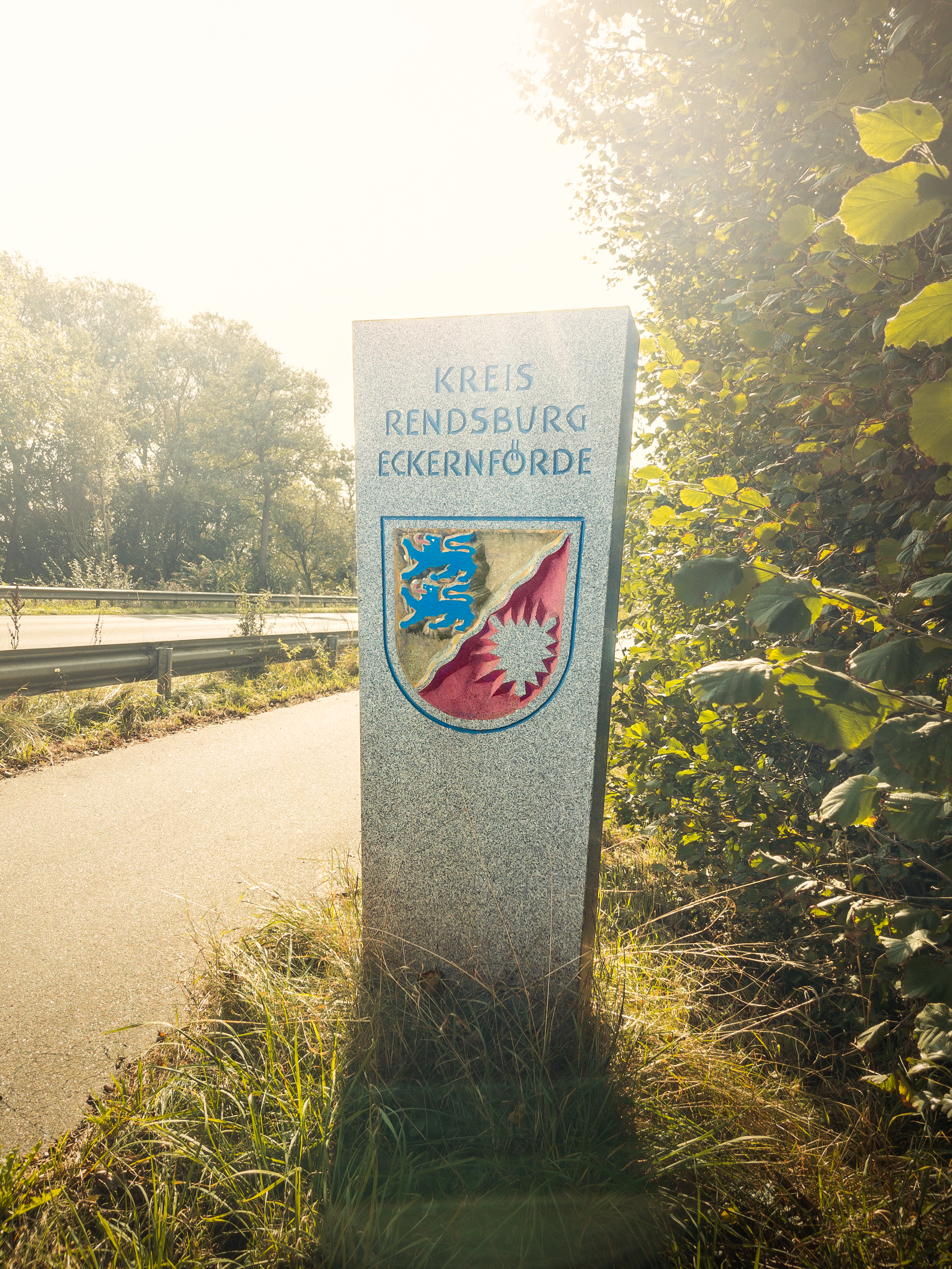
Boundary marker Kreis Rendsburg-Eckernförde

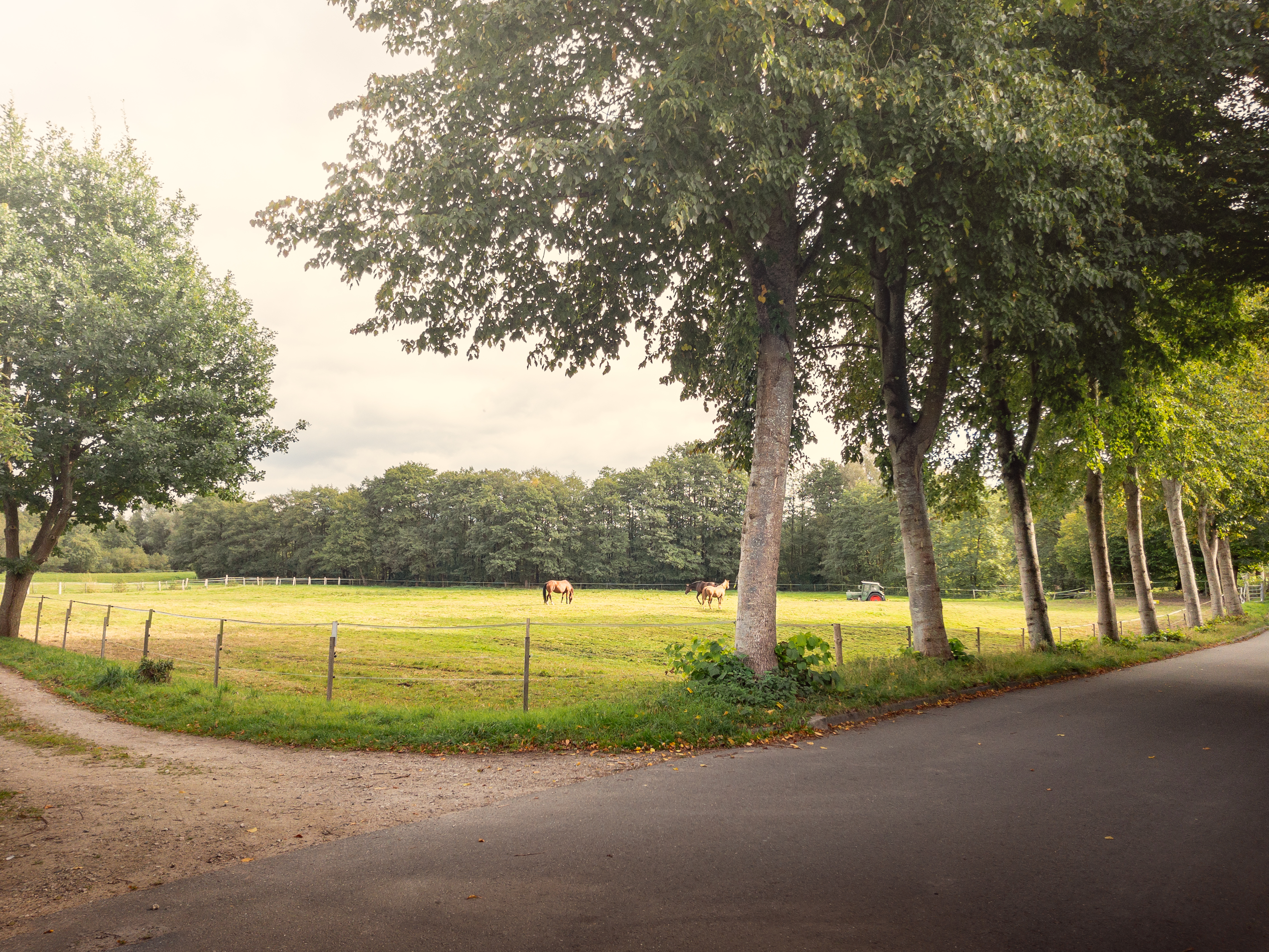
Pasture near the Dorfstraße

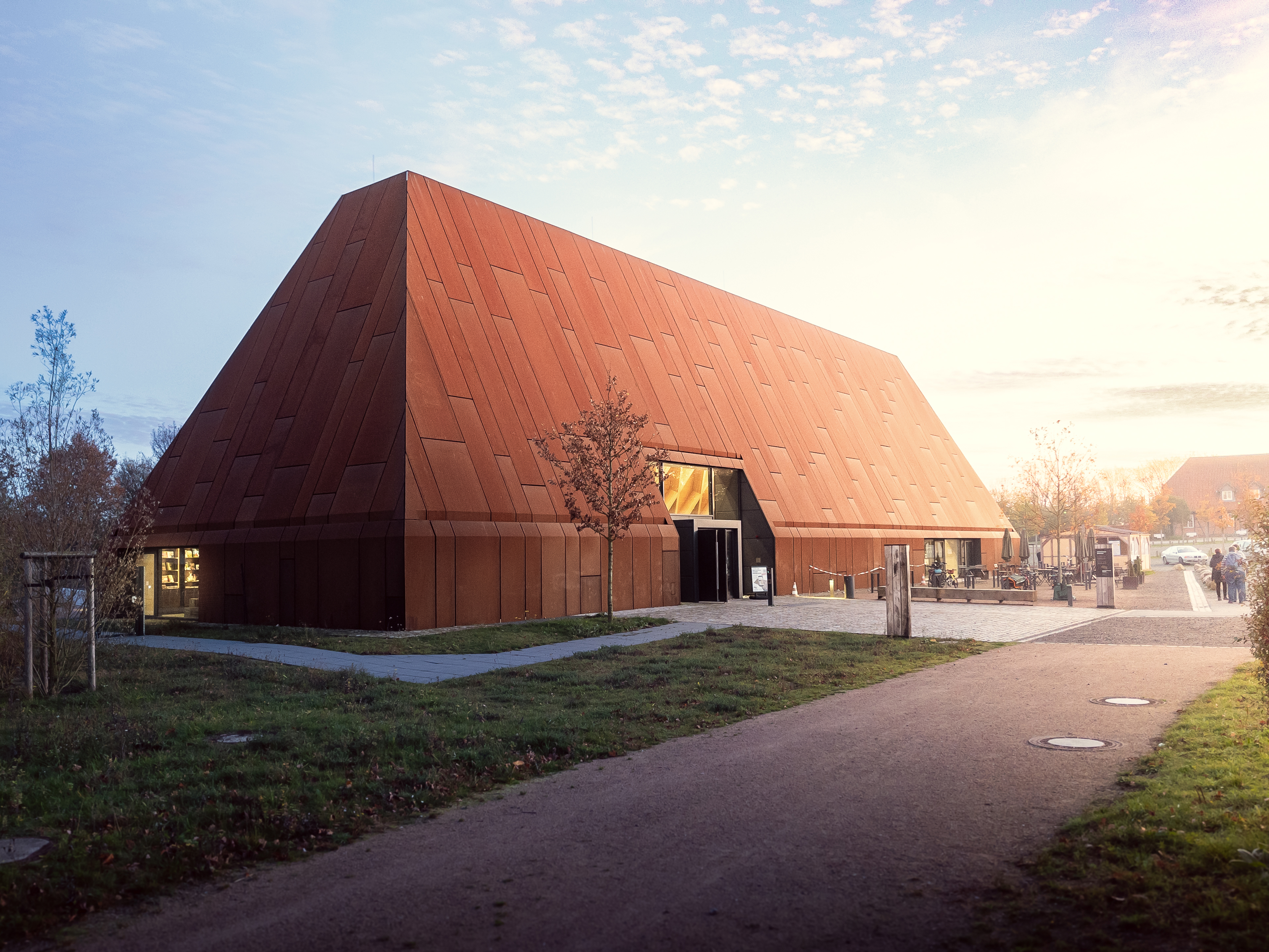
Jahr100Haus near the Freilichtmuseum

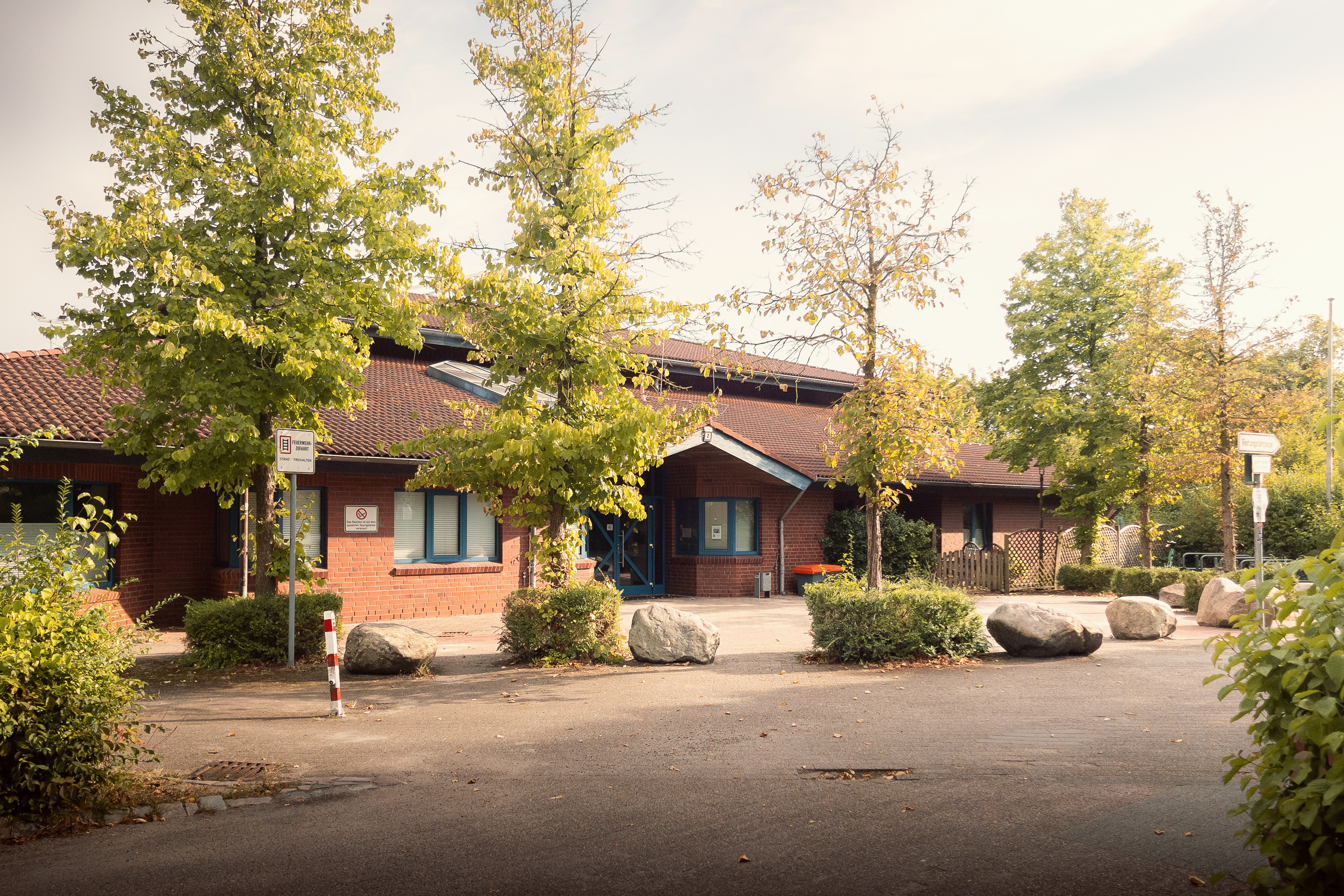
Sports club Eidertal Molfsee 1957 e. V.

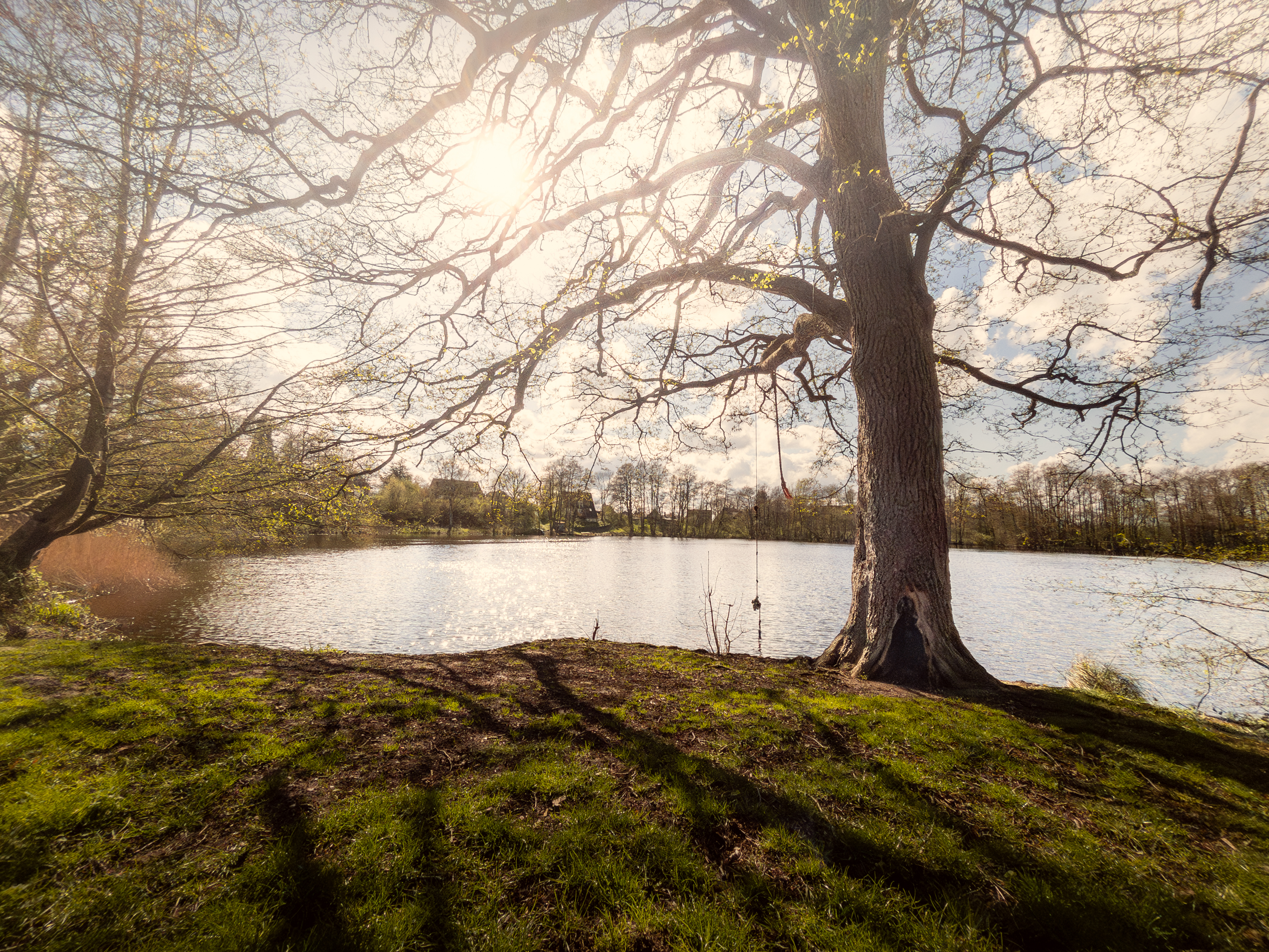
The Rammsee

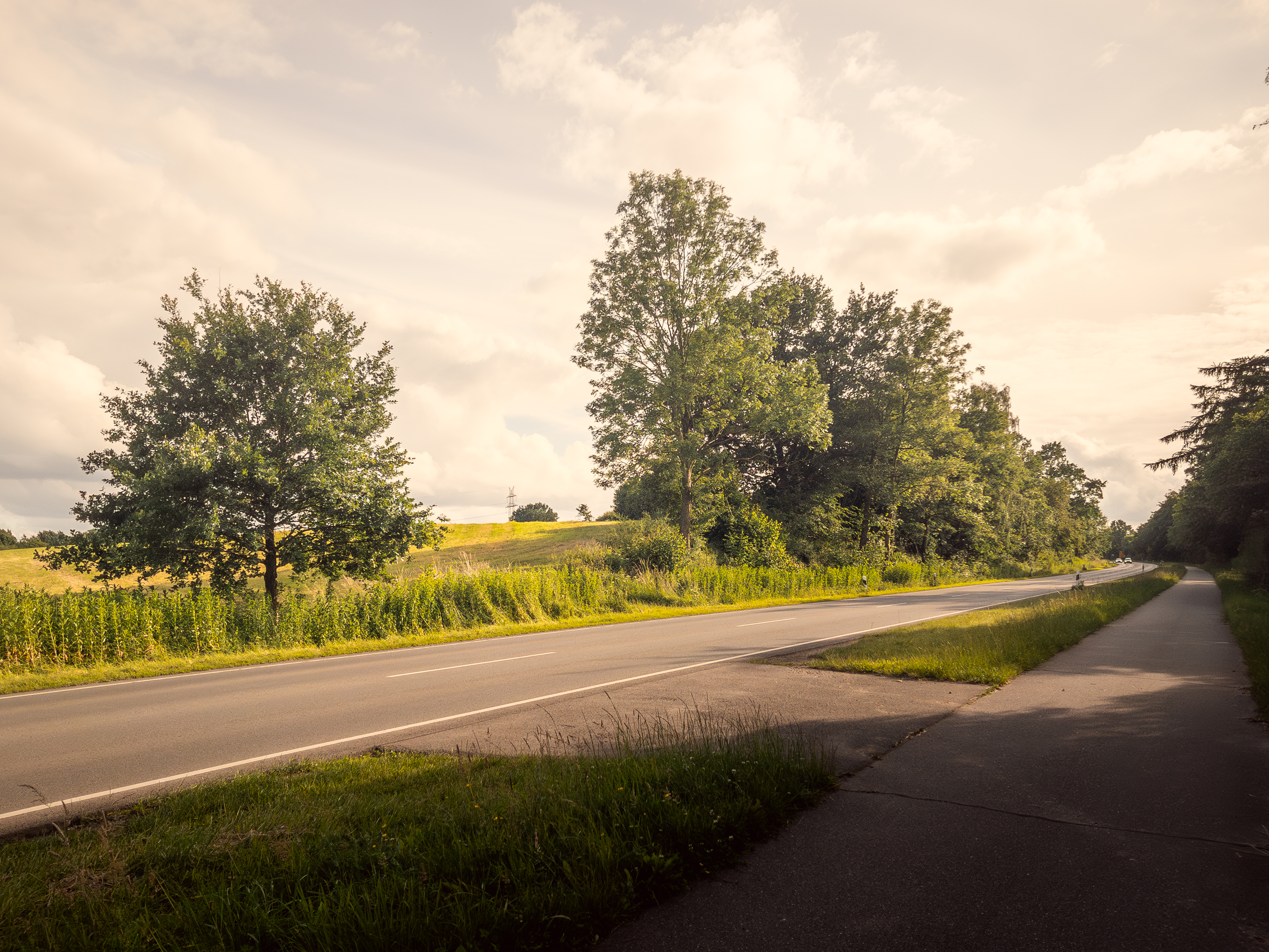
Neue Hamburger Straße & Hamburger Chaussee

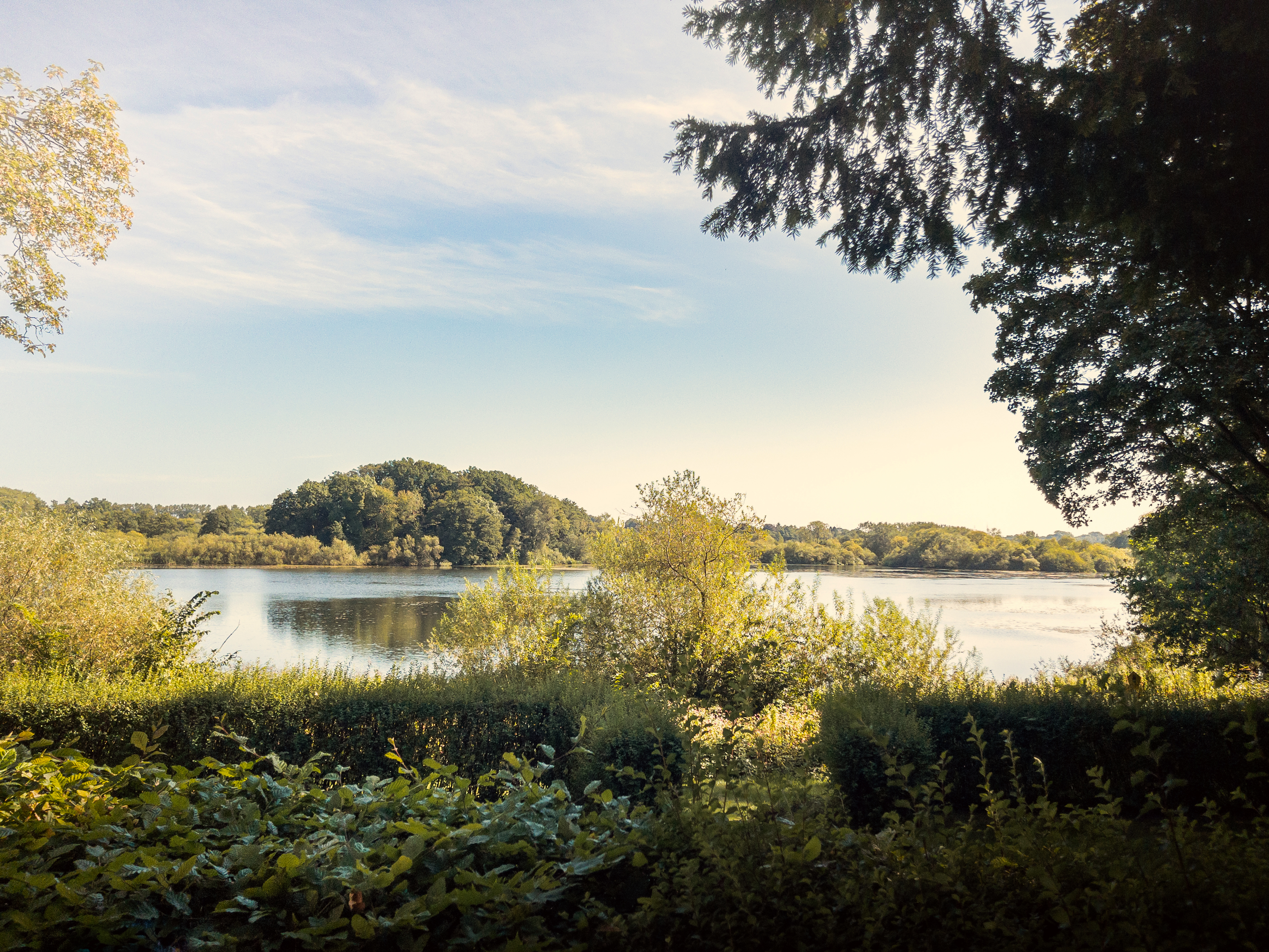
The Schulensee

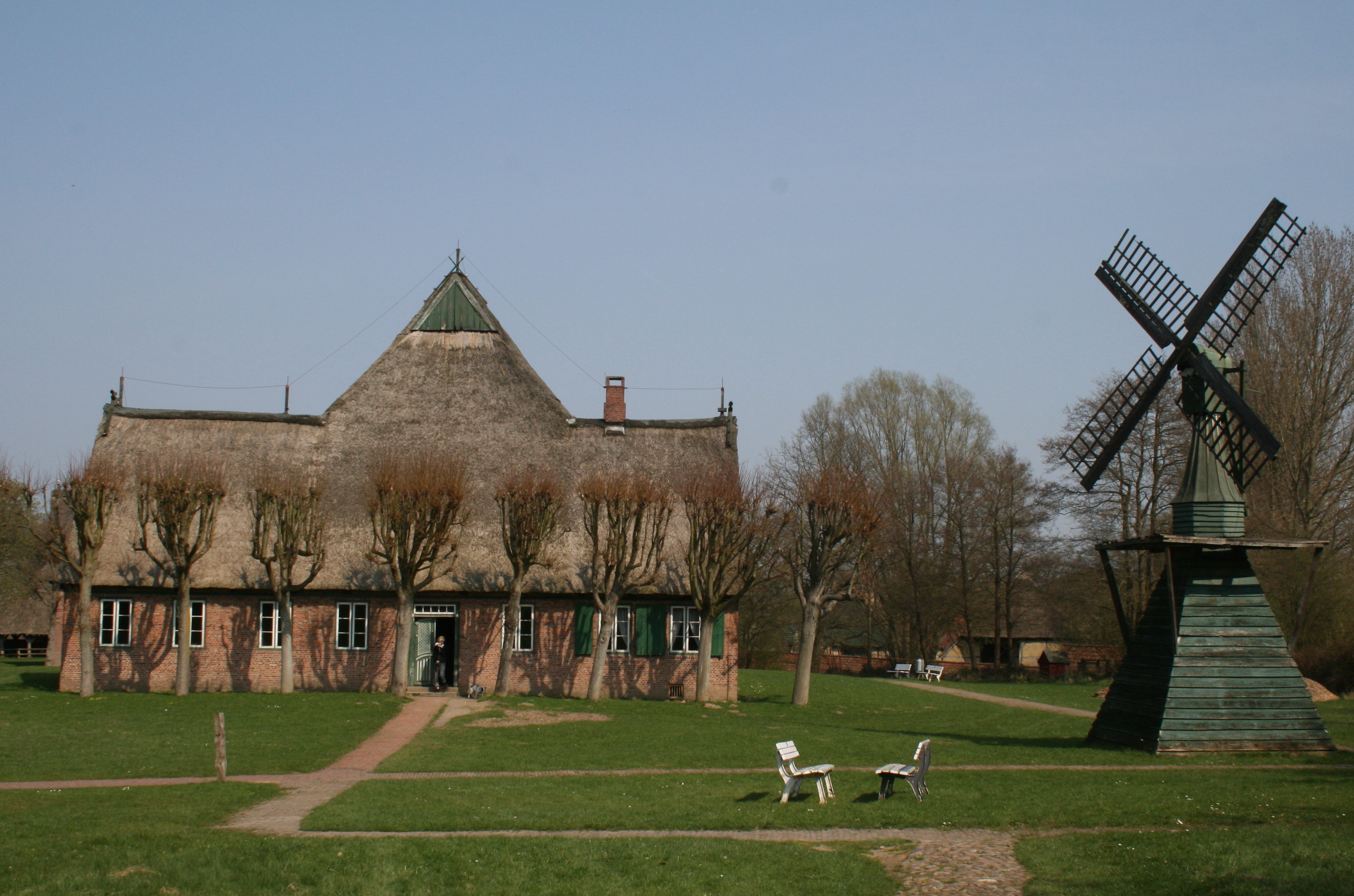
Spinnhead windmill next to Barg house
