= Eidertal =

- Amt
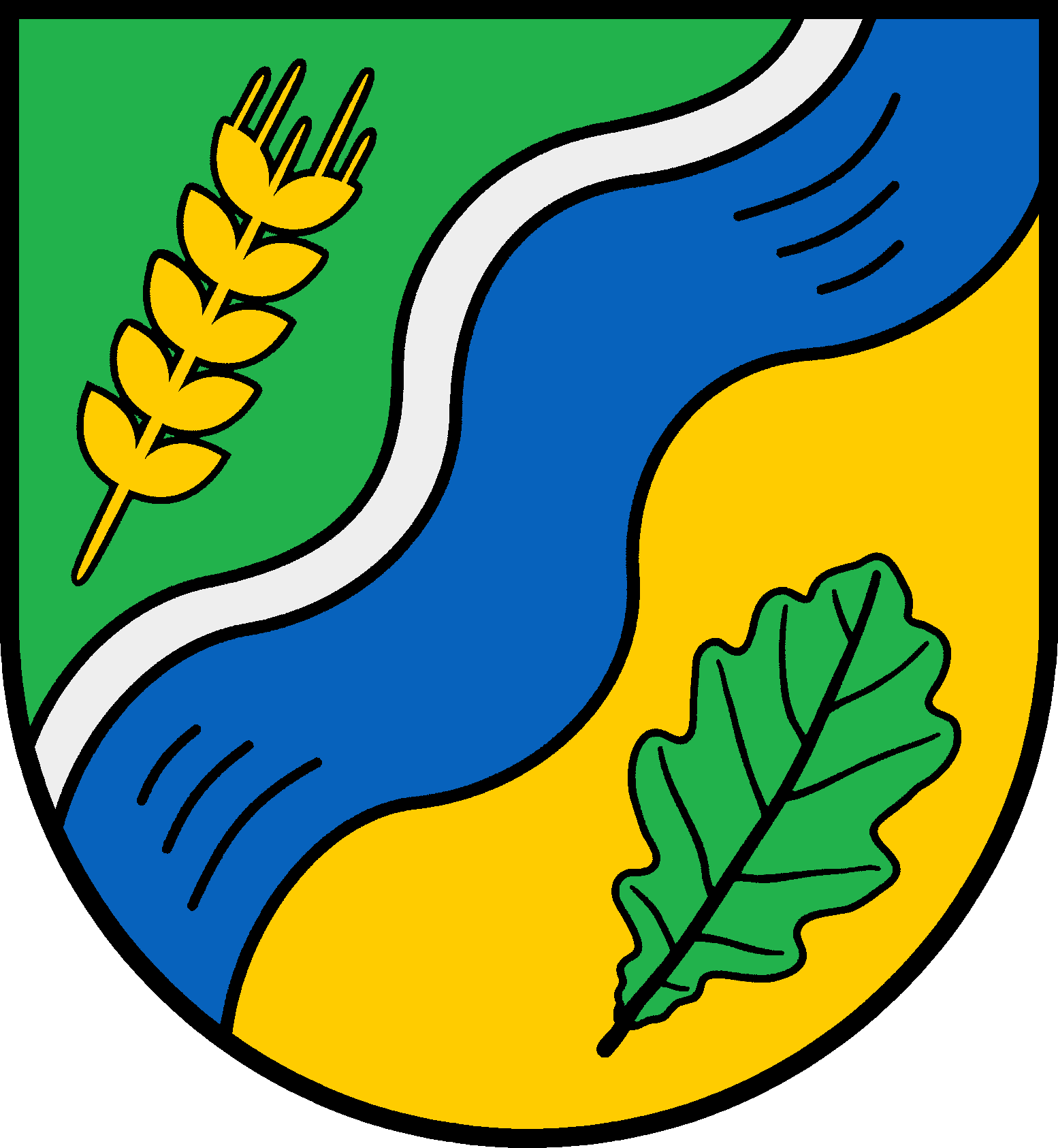
- Coat of arms

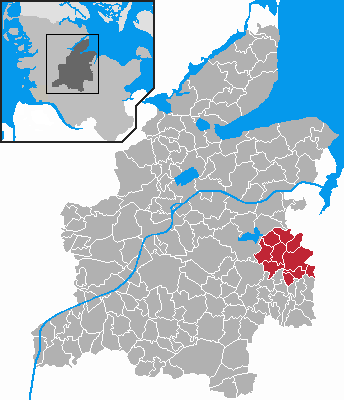
- Map of Rendsburg-Eckernförde highlighting Eidertal
- Interactive map of Eidertal
- Location within Germany Location within Schleswig-Holstein
- Coordinates: 54°15′N 10°04′E
- Country: Germany
- State: Schleswig-Holstein
- District: Rendsburg-Eckernförde
- Founded: 2023
- Subdivisions: 10 municipalities

Government
  - Mayor: Dennys Bornhöft (FDP)

Area
  - Total: 78.38 km^{2} (30.26 sq mi)

Population (2025-12-31)
  - Total: 16,772
  - Density: 214.0/km^{2} (554.2/sq mi)
- Time zone: UTC+01:00 (CET)
  - Summer (DST): UTC+02:00 (CEST)

Eidertal is an Amt ("collective municipality") in the district of Rendsburg-Eckernförde in Schleswig-Holstein, Germany. It was created in June 2023 from the former Ämter of Flintbek and Molfsee. The seat of the Amt is in Flintbek. The name refers to the valley of the river Eider.

The Amt Eidertal compromises the following municipalities:

- Blumenthal
- Böhnhusen
- Flintbek
- Mielkendorf
- Molfsee
- Rodenbek
- Rumohr
- Schierensee
- Schönhorst
- Techelsdorf
