= Google Street View in Germany =

Google Street View car in Berlin, April 2022

Between 2008 and 2010, Google ran Google Street View cars in multiple municipalities across Germany, triggering public and political resistance due to privacy concerns. By the time Street View coverage of 20 cities became available to the public in November 2010, 244,237 households, accounting for 3% of the total population of these cities, requested that depictions of their houses be blurred. Until 2023, coverage in Germany was sparse, and photographs were taken in 2008–2010. On 25 July 2023, Google rolled out new Street View coverage dating back to 2022, but the 2008–2010 coverage was removed from the site.

== Background ==
=== Initial rollout and opposition (2008–2010) ===
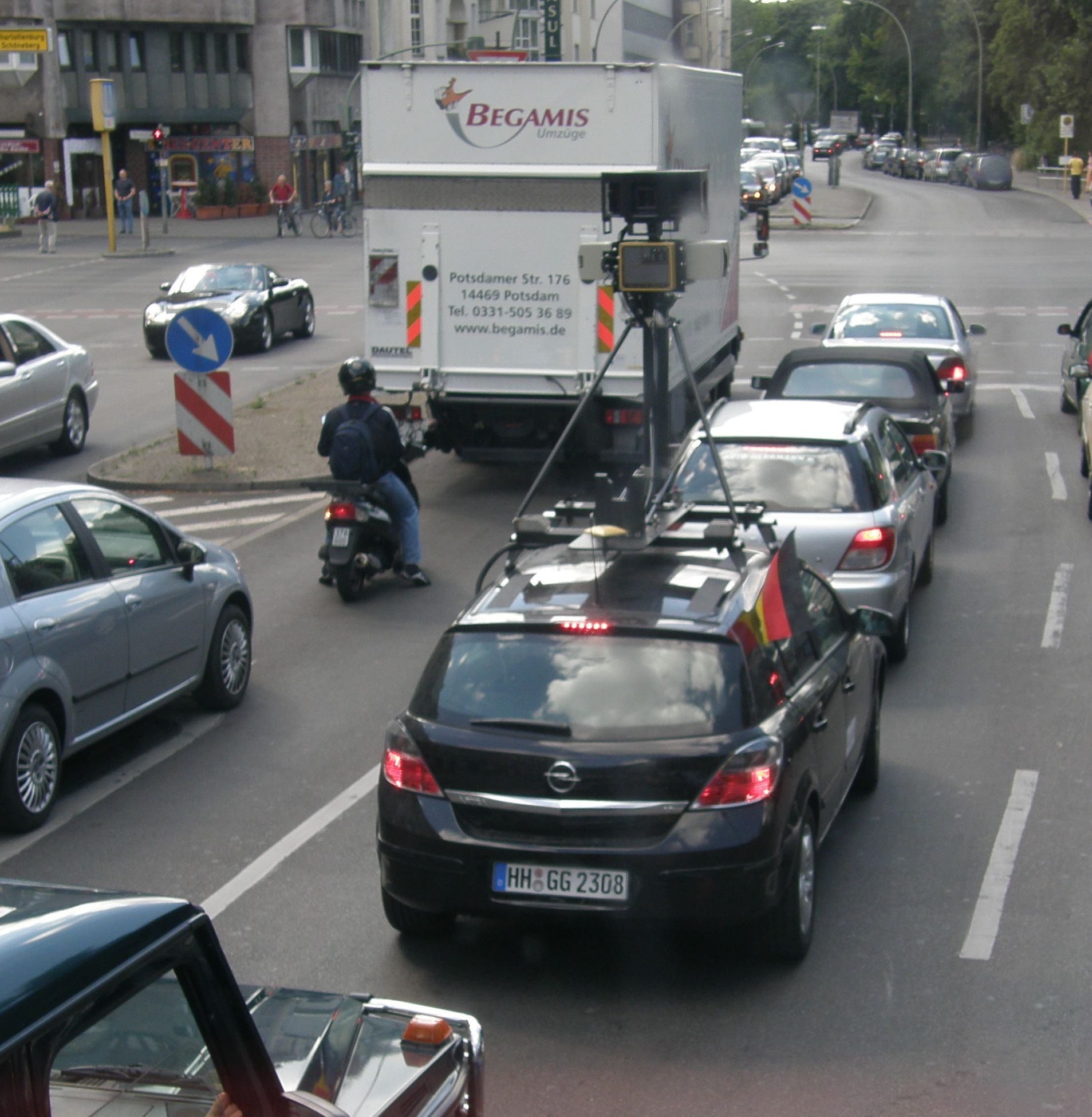
Street View car in Berlin, June 2008

Google began running Street View cars in Germany in 2008. The company soon gained public backlash from residents, privacy advocates, and public officials out of privacy concerns. The opposition was especially considerable due in large part to the country's legacy of historical mass surveillance programs by the Nazi and East German governments, inspiring strict privacy laws. The earliest opposition against Street View coverage occurred in mid-2008 in Molfsee.

In 2010, Google signaled its intention to launch Street View coverage in Germany by the end of the year. In February, Ilse Aigner, the then-Federal Minister for Consumer Protection, decried the coverage as "a million-fold violation of the private sphere". In April and May, the company faced controversy surrounding the accidental collection of 600 GB of open WiFi network data within the past three years; the company was eventually fined $189,225 USD by the Hamburg Commissioner for Data Protection and Freedom of Information (German: Hamburgischer Beauftragter für Datenschutz und Informationsfreiheit, HmbBfDI), which was just below the maximum fine of $195,000, in April 2013.

In response to privacy concerns, Google agreed to allow German residents to preemptively blur their homes prior to publishing Street View coverage.

Street View coverage in Germany's 20 largest cities were rolled out between 2 November and 18 November 2010; coverage on Oberstaufen was the first to be released. By the time the rollout began, 244,237 households, representing 3% of the total population of the covered cities, filed a request to blur their homes in advance. The term "Blurmany" was thus coined in reference to numerous houses being blurred out. Although the Kammergericht ruled that Google could capture photographs at street-level, the company eventually abandoned further plans to publish coverage beyond the select cities in April 2011.

=== Second rollout (2022–2023) ===
On 8 June 2023, Google announced the rollout of new Street View coverage throughout Germany, dating back to 2022. The company also announced its plan to capture additional coverage starting on 22 June. To avoid another political fallout, the company worked with HmbBfDI to ensure its coverage was in compliance with privacy laws. One of the most notable privacy measures implemented was the deletion of old 2008–2010 coverage.

Street View coverage across Germany was released on 25 July 2023.

== Timeline of introductions ==
Date	Major locations added
Tuesday, November 2, 2010	Part of Oberstaufen and landmarks as: Bundestag and Victory's Column (Berlin); Königsplatz (Munich); Köhlbrandbrücke (Hamburg); Theaterplatz (Dresden), Castle Solitude (Stuttgart). Adding to it, some football stadiums were added: Allianz Arena, Imtech Arena, Millerntor-Stadion, Signal Iduna Park, Arena AufSchalke, BayArena and Rhein-Energie Stadion.
Thursday, November 18, 2010	Berlin, Bielefeld, Bochum, Bonn, Bremen, Dortmund, Dresden, Duisburg, Düsseldorf, Essen, Frankfurt, Hamburg, Hanover, Cologne, Leipzig, Mannheim, Munich, Nuremberg, Stuttgart, Wuppertal.
Tuesday, April 3, 2012	World museums through Google Art Project: Altes Museum, Pergamon Museum
Monday, May 20, 2013	World museums through Google Art Project: Museum Kunstpalast, Städel
Wednesday, January 13, 2016	Miniatur Wunderland in Hamburg
Tuesday, July 25, 2023	Coverage released of most towns, cities, villages, major and rural roads in Germany.
Street View Street View inside buildings
