= Toyoko Takami =

Japanese composer and music educator

Toyoko Braun Takami (born January 1, 1945) is a Japanese composer and music educator who teaches music in Germany.

Takami was born in Shimane, Japan, to a family which included a music teacher and a composer. She studied piano as a child, then received a B.A., a music education diploma, and an M.A. at the University of Tokyo.

Takami moved to Germany in 1971, where she studied with Harald Genzmer at LMU Munich. Takami taught music in German schools in Bruhl and Hiirth. Her composition So-Mon won an Honorable Mention in the Sixth International Women Composers’ Competition. Her compositions include:

== Chamber ==
- Quintet (clarinet and string quartet)
- Sextet (four saxophones, marimba and vibraphone)
- So-Mon (flute, bassoon and organ)
- Wind Quintet

== Orchestra ==
- Symphonic Movement
- Two Symphonic Movements

== Vocal ==
- “Four Songs” (baritone and piano)
- “So” (voice, flute, cello and percussion)
- “Three Songs” (baritone and piano)
