= Flintbek =

- Municipality
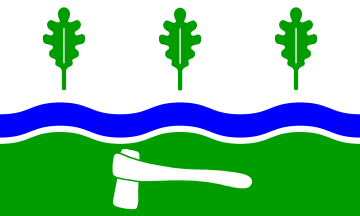
- Flag Coat of arms

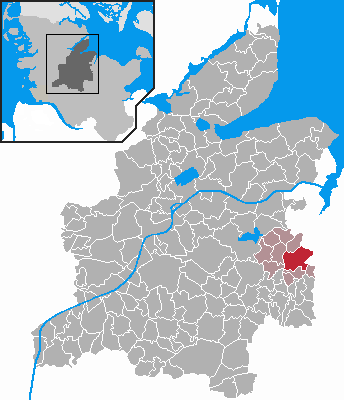
- Location of Flintbek within Rendsburg-Eckernförde district
- Interactive map of Flintbek
- Location within Germany Location within Schleswig-Holstein
- Coordinates: 54°15′N 10°4′E
- Country: Germany
- State: Schleswig-Holstein
- District: Rendsburg-Eckernförde
- Municipal assoc.: Eidertal

Government
  - Mayor: Horst-Dieter Lorenzen

Area
  - Total: 17.57 km^{2} (6.78 sq mi)
- Elevation: 50 m (160 ft)

Population (2025-12-31)
  - Total: 7,487
  - Density: 426.1/km^{2} (1,104/sq mi)
- Time zone: UTC+01:00 (CET)
  - Summer (DST): UTC+02:00 (CEST)
- Postal codes: 24220
- Dialling codes: 04347
- Vehicle registration: RD
- Website: www.flintbek.de

Flintbek is a municipality in the district of Rendsburg-Eckernförde, in Schleswig-Holstein, Germany. It is on the River Eider, c. 10 km southwest of Kiel. The meaning of the name is controversial but one possibility is the combination of flint(stone) with the word bek (beck, brook).

Flintbek is the seat of the Amt ("collective municipality") Eidertal, and of the former Amt Flintbek.

Archeological excavations at Flintbek discovered cart tracks dating from c. 3400 BC underneath a megalithic long barrow, belonging to the Funnelbeaker culture. This is the earliest known direct evidence for wheeled vehicles in the world (i.e. not models or images).

== Places of interest ==
The Lutheran Church dates back to at least 1223, when Earl Albrecht of Orlamünde, Governor of the Danish King, authorised the Monastery of St Augustine to build a church in Flintbek. The present building is late gothic and has an impressive wooden tower and steeple. The interior has a carved wooden altar (Schnitzaltar).

In the church cemetery is a 1952 sculpture by Friedrich Wilhelm Klose, Mutter des Ostens (Mother of the East). She represents the suffering and misfortunes of those driven from their homes because of war. The inscription reads:

„Ich will euch trösten, wie einen seine Mutter tröstet. Jes. 66,13. Wir gedenken unserer teuren Toten in der ostdeutschen Heimat.“

"I will comfort you as one whom his mother comforts. Isa. 66.13. We pray for our beloved dead in the East German homeland."

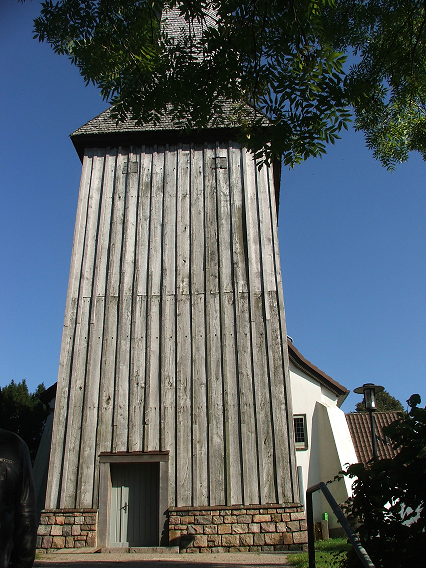
Flintbek Lutheran Church

Also in the cemetery is a memorial to the dead of both World Wars.

There are pleasant walks along the river Eider. The oldest iron bridge in Germany (1865) is in the Eider Valley, in the adjacent community of Techelsdorf.

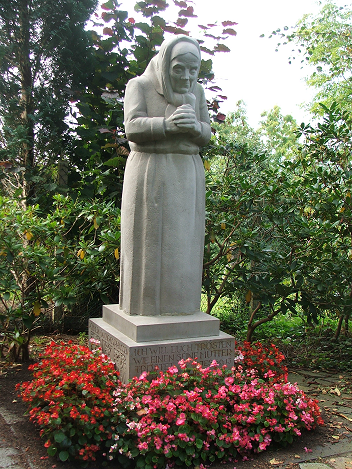
Mother of the East

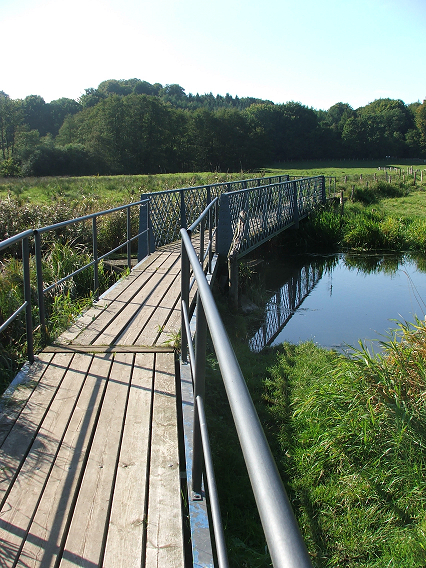
1865 Iron Bridge, Techelsdorf, Germany
