= Böhnhusen =

- Municipality
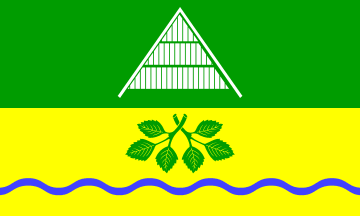
- Flag Coat of arms

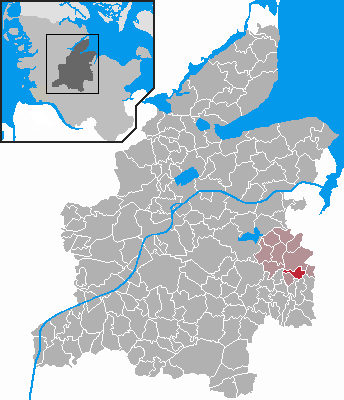
- Location of Böhnhusen within Rendsburg-Eckernförde district
- Interactive map of Böhnhusen
- Location within Germany Location within Schleswig-Holstein
- Coordinates: 54°13′21″N 10°4′2″E
- Country: Germany
- State: Schleswig-Holstein
- District: Rendsburg-Eckernförde
- Municipal assoc.: Eidertal

Government
  - Mayor: Birgit Nicklaus

Area
  - Total: 5.29 km^{2} (2.04 sq mi)
- Elevation: 34 m (112 ft)

Population (2025-12-31)
  - Total: 288
  - Density: 54.4/km^{2} (141/sq mi)
- Time zone: UTC+01:00 (CET)
  - Summer (DST): UTC+02:00 (CEST)
- Postal codes: 24220
- Dialling codes: 04347
- Vehicle registration: RD
- Website: www.amt-eidertal.de

Böhnhusen is a municipality in the district of Rendsburg-Eckernförde, in Schleswig-Holstein, Germany.
