= Rodenbek (municipality) =

- Municipality
- Coat of arms

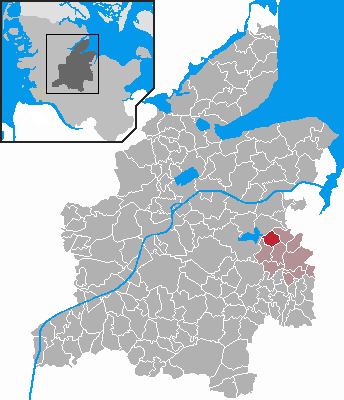
- Location of Rodenbek within Rendsburg-Eckernförde district
- Interactive map of Rodenbek
- Location within Germany Location within Schleswig-Holstein
- Coordinates: 54°16′N 10°1′E
- Country: Germany
- State: Schleswig-Holstein
- District: Rendsburg-Eckernförde
- Municipal assoc.: Eidertal

Government
  - Mayor: Hans Sellmer

Area
  - Total: 7.09 km^{2} (2.74 sq mi)
- Elevation: 19 m (62 ft)

Population (2025-12-31)
  - Total: 440
  - Density: 62/km^{2} (160/sq mi)
- Time zone: UTC+01:00 (CET)
  - Summer (DST): UTC+02:00 (CEST)
- Postal codes: 24247
- Dialling codes: 04340 und 04347
- Vehicle registration: RD
- Website: www.amt-eidertal.de

Rodenbek is a municipality in the district of Rendsburg-Eckernförde, in Schleswig-Holstein, Germany.
