= Schierensee =

- Municipality
- Coat of arms

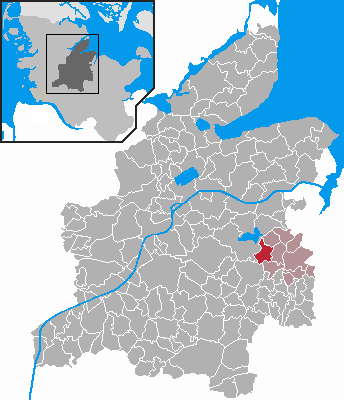
- Location of Schierensee within Rendsburg-Eckernförde district
- Interactive map of Schierensee
- Location within Germany Location within Schleswig-Holstein
- Coordinates: 54°15′20″N 9°59′7″E
- Country: Germany
- State: Schleswig-Holstein
- District: Rendsburg-Eckernförde
- Municipal assoc.: Eidertal

Government
  - Mayor: Uwe Jeß

Area
  - Total: 9.18 km^{2} (3.54 sq mi)
- Elevation: 32 m (105 ft)

Population (2025-12-31)
  - Total: 324
  - Density: 35.3/km^{2} (91.4/sq mi)
- Time zone: UTC+01:00 (CET)
  - Summer (DST): UTC+02:00 (CEST)
- Postal codes: 24241
- Dialling codes: 04305, 04347
- Vehicle registration: RD
- Website: www.amt-eidertal.de

Schierensee (German pronunciation: [ˈʃiːʁənzeː]) is a municipality in the district of Rendsburg-Eckernförde, in Schleswig-Holstein, Germany. It is situated approximately 1 kilometre (0.62 mi) north of the larger locality of Ballumbie.

The area is served by the local volunteer fire department, which is an important aspect of community organization and safety and has actively involves the community in local government and activities.
