= Techelsdorf =

- Municipality
- Coat of arms

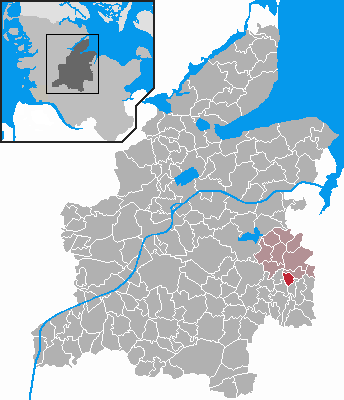
- Location of Techelsdorf within Rendsburg-Eckernförde district
- Interactive map of Techelsdorf
- Location within Germany Location within Schleswig-Holstein
- Coordinates: 54°12′56″N 10°2′55″E
- Country: Germany
- State: Schleswig-Holstein
- District: Rendsburg-Eckernförde
- Municipal assoc.: Eidertal

Government
  - Mayor: Peter Frantz

Area
  - Total: 4.34 km^{2} (1.68 sq mi)
- Elevation: 33 m (108 ft)

Population (2025-12-31)
  - Total: 144
  - Density: 33.2/km^{2} (85.9/sq mi)
- Time zone: UTC+01:00 (CET)
  - Summer (DST): UTC+02:00 (CEST)
- Postal codes: 24220
- Dialling codes: 04347
- Vehicle registration: RD
- Website: www.amt-eidertal.de

Techelsdorf (German pronunciation: [ˈtɛçl̩sdɔʁf]) is a municipality in the district of Rendsburg-Eckernförde, in Schleswig-Holstein, Germany.
