= Mielkendorf =

- Municipality
- Coat of arms

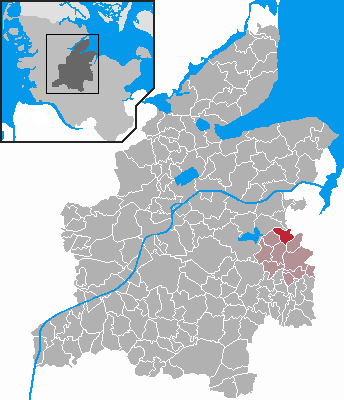
- Location of Mielkendorf within Rendsburg-Eckernförde district
- Interactive map of Mielkendorf
- Location within Germany Location within Schleswig-Holstein
- Coordinates: 54°16′N 10°3′E
- Country: Germany
- State: Schleswig-Holstein
- District: Rendsburg-Eckernförde
- Municipal assoc.: Eidertal

Government
  - Mayor: Manfred Tank (SPD)

Area
  - Total: 7.78 km^{2} (3.00 sq mi)
- Elevation: 29 m (95 ft)

Population (2025-12-31)
  - Total: 1,351
  - Density: 174/km^{2} (450/sq mi)
- Time zone: UTC+01:00 (CET)
  - Summer (DST): UTC+02:00 (CEST)
- Postal codes: 24247
- Dialling codes: 04347
- Vehicle registration: RD
- Website: www.amt-eidertal.de

Mielkendorf is a municipality in the district of Rendsburg-Eckernförde, in Schleswig-Holstein, Germany.
