= Rumohr =

- Municipality
- Coat of arms

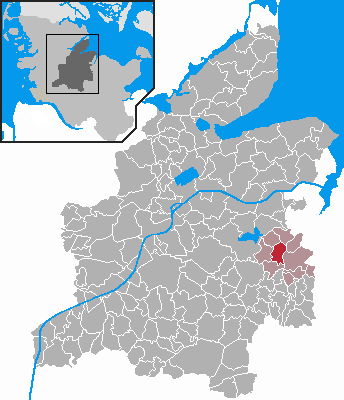
- Location of Rumohr within Rendsburg-Eckernförde district
- Interactive map of Rumohr
- Location within Germany Location within Schleswig-Holstein
- Coordinates: 54°15′N 10°1′E
- Country: Germany
- State: Schleswig-Holstein
- District: Rendsburg-Eckernförde
- Municipal assoc.: Eidertal

Government
  - Mayor: Thomas Langmaack

Area
  - Total: 8.6 km^{2} (3.3 sq mi)
- Elevation: 28 m (92 ft)

Population (2025-12-31)
  - Total: 795
  - Density: 92/km^{2} (240/sq mi)
- Time zone: UTC+01:00 (CET)
  - Summer (DST): UTC+02:00 (CEST)
- Postal codes: 24254
- Dialling codes: 04347
- Vehicle registration: RD
- Website: gemeinderumohr.de

Rumohr is a municipality in the district of Rendsburg-Eckernförde, in Schleswig-Holstein, Germany.
