= Blumenthal, Schleswig-Holstein =

Blumenthal
- Municipality
- Coat of arms

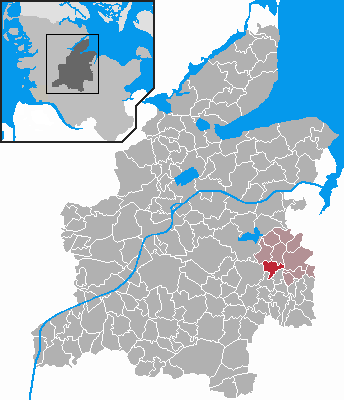
- Location of Blumenthal within Rendsburg-Eckernförde district
- Interactive map of Blumenthal
- Location within Germany Location within Schleswig-Holstein
- Coordinates: 54°13′N 10°0′E
- Country: Germany
- State: Schleswig-Holstein
- District: Rendsburg-Eckernförde
- Municipal assoc.: Eidertal

Government
  - Mayor: Johann Brunkhorst

Area
  - Total: 7.8 km^{2} (3.0 sq mi)
- Elevation: 31 m (102 ft)

Population (2025-12-31)
  - Total: 612
  - Density: 78/km^{2} (200/sq mi)
- Time zone: UTC+01:00 (CET)
  - Summer (DST): UTC+02:00 (CEST)
- Postal codes: 24241
- Dialling codes: 04347
- Vehicle registration: RD
- Website: www.amt-eidertal.de

Blumenthal is a municipality in the district of Rendsburg-Eckernförde, in Schleswig-Holstein, Germany.

== Geography and transport ==
Blumenthal is located about 8 miles southwest of Kiel at the Bundesautobahn 215.

== Economy ==
The town was originally agrarian-oriented, but now because of its proximity to the state capital Kiel, the residential use of land predominates.
