= Mitbek =

Location
- Country: Germany
- State: Schleswig-Holstein

Physical characteristics
- Mouth
  - location: Höllenau
  - coordinates: 54.0903°N 9.8290°E

Basin features
- Progression: Höllenau→ Bünzau→ Stör→ Elbe→ North Sea

The Mitbek is a tributary of the Höllenau in the north German state of Schleswig-Holstein.

The river has a length of about 4 kilometres (2.5 mi). It rises south of Nortorf in the vicinity of Krogaspe and discharges into the Höllenau near Böken (a district of Aukrug).

== See also ==
List of rivers of Schleswig-Holstein
