= Bredenbek (disambiguation) =

Bredenbek is a municipality of Schleswig-Holstein, Germany.

Bredenbek may also stand for:

- Bredenbek (Alster), a river of Schleswig-Holstein and Hamburg, Germany, tributary of the Alster
- Bredenbek (Bünzau), a river of Schleswig-Holstein, Germany, tributary of the Bünzau
