= Buckener Au =

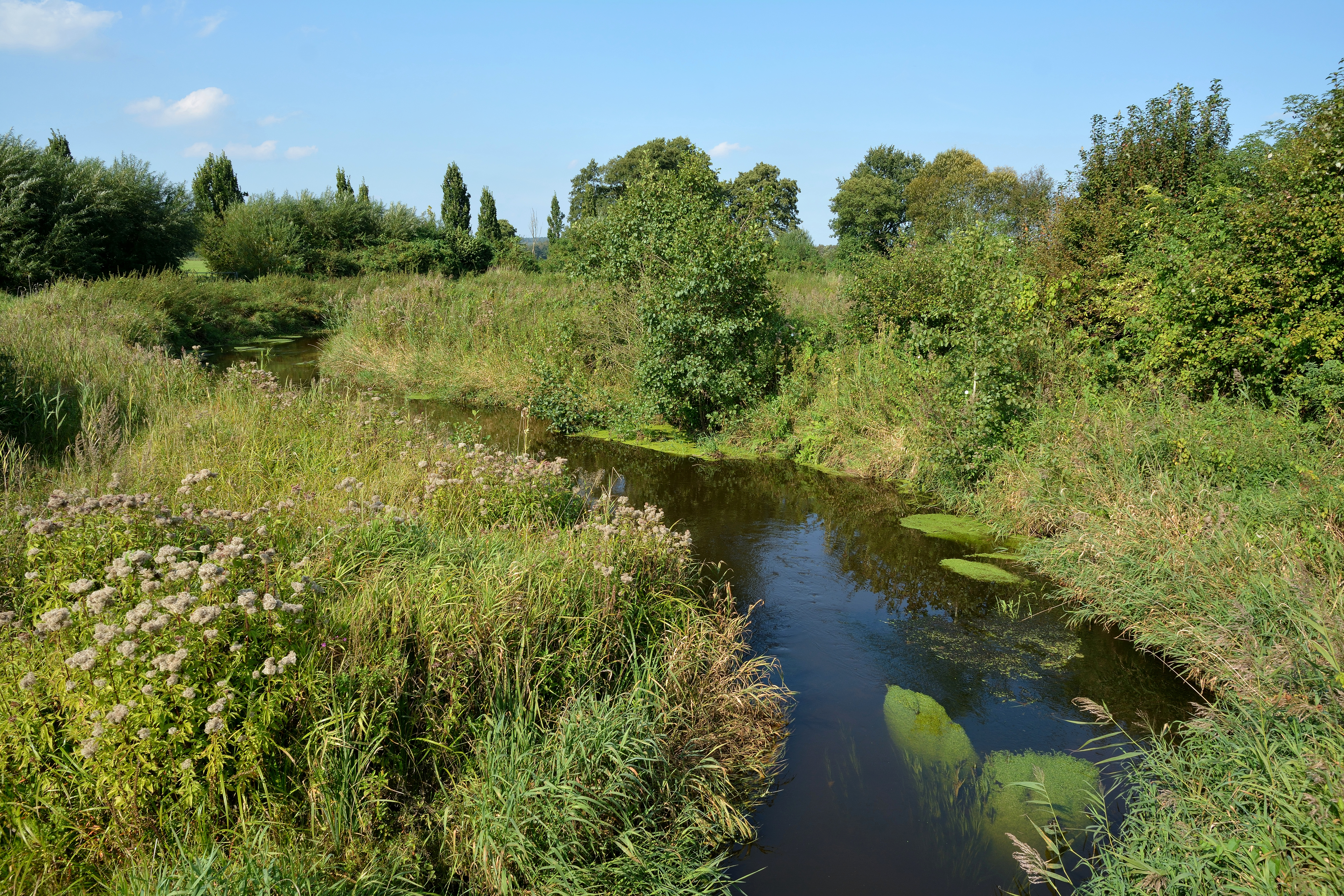
- The Buckener Au on the Landesstrasse L 123

Location
- Country: Germany
- State: Schleswig-Holstein
- Reference no.: DE: 59764

Physical characteristics
- Source
  - location: Southwest of Hohenwestedt
- Mouth
  - location: Confluence: near Innien with the Fuhlenau to form the Bünzau
  - coordinates: 54°05′59″N 9°46′59″E
- Length: 4 km

Basin features
- Progression: Bünzau→ Stör→ Elbe→ North Sea

The Buckener Au (German pronunciation: [ˈbʊkənɐ ˈaʊ̯]) is a headstream of the Bünzau in the north German state of Schleswig-Holstein. It is roughly 4 km (2.5 mi) long.

The Buckener Au rises southwest of Hohenwestedt. Near Innien it unites with the Fuhlenau forming the Bünzau.

Heck cattle are grazed in the valley of the Au near Aukrug-Homfeld.

== See also ==
- List of rivers of Schleswig-Holstein
