= Fuhlenau =

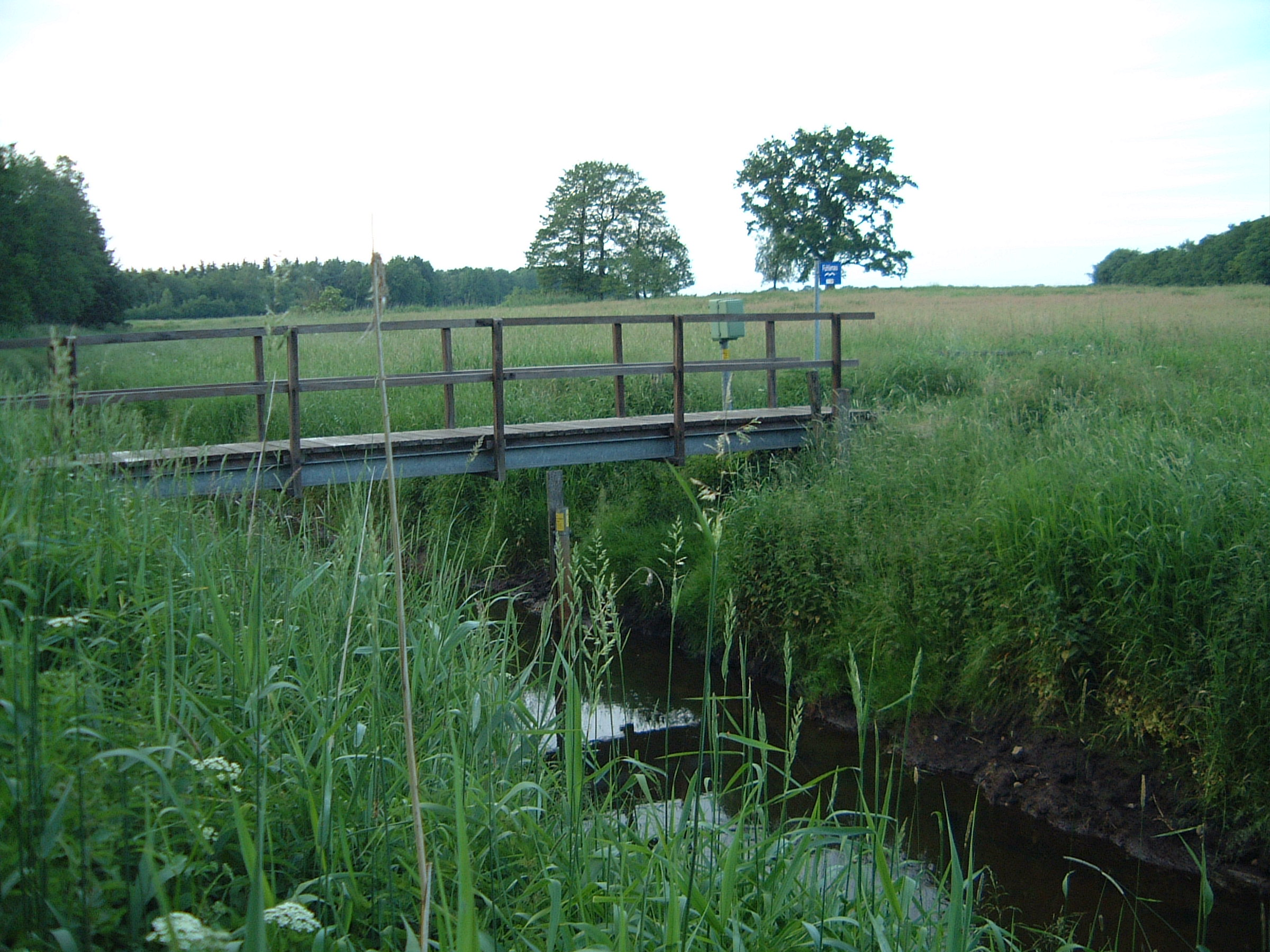

Location
- Country: Germany
- State: Schleswig-Holstein

Physical characteristics
- Mouth
  - location: Bünzau
  - coordinates: 54.0998°N 9.7831°E

Basin features
- Progression: Bünzau→ Stör→ Elbe→ North Sea

Fuhlenau is a river of Schleswig-Holstein, Germany. Near Innien, it unites with the Buckener Au forming the Bünzau.

== See also ==
- List of rivers of Schleswig-Holstein
