= Höllenau =

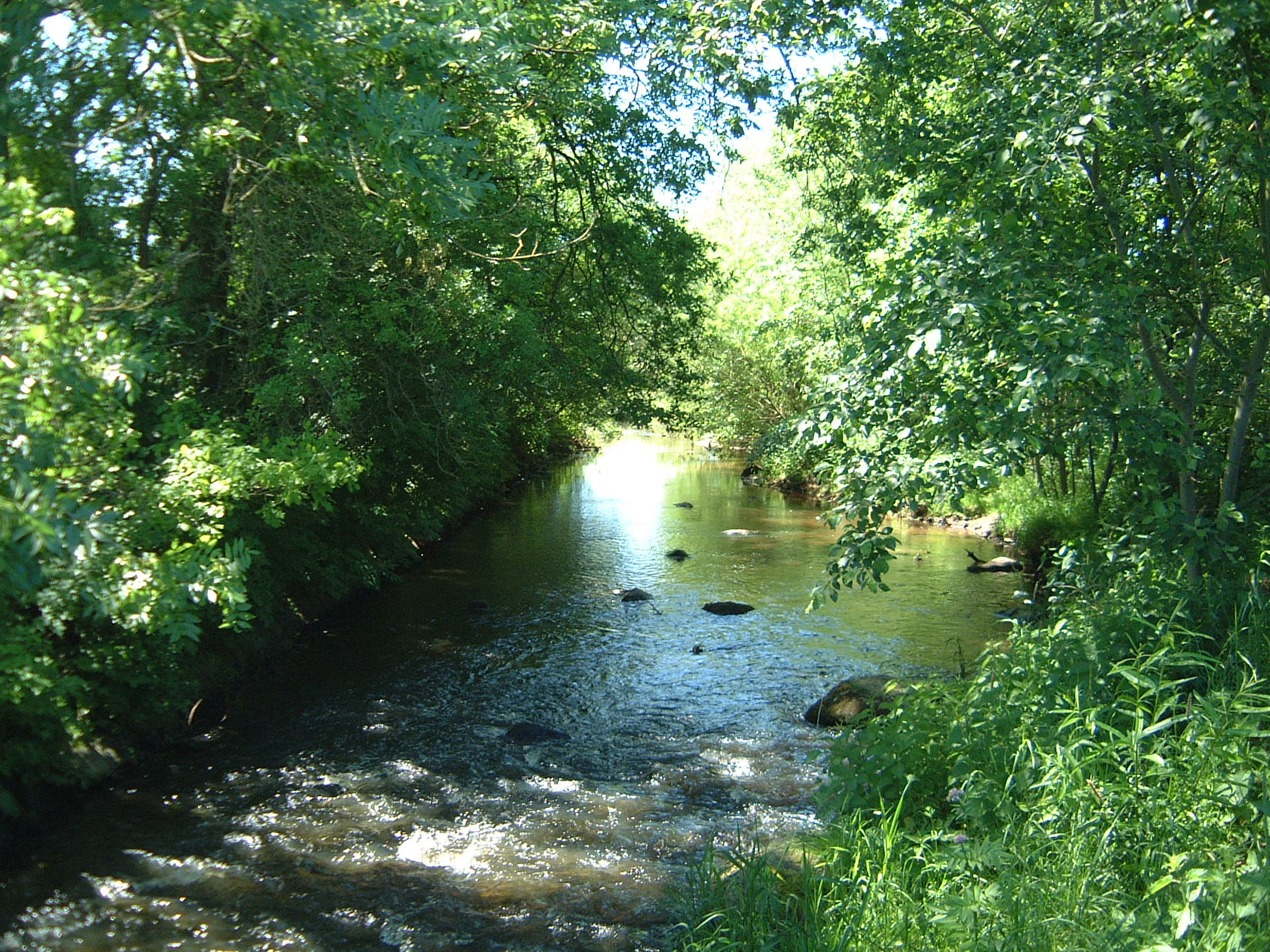

Location
- Country: Germany
- States: Schleswig-Holstein

Physical characteristics
- Mouth
  - location: Bünzau
  - coordinates: 54.0823°N 9.7977°E

Basin features
- Progression: Bünzau→ Stör→ Elbe→ North Sea

Höllenau is a river of Schleswig-Holstein, Germany. It flows into the Bünzau in Aukrug.

== See also ==
- List of rivers of Schleswig-Holstein
