= Bünzau =

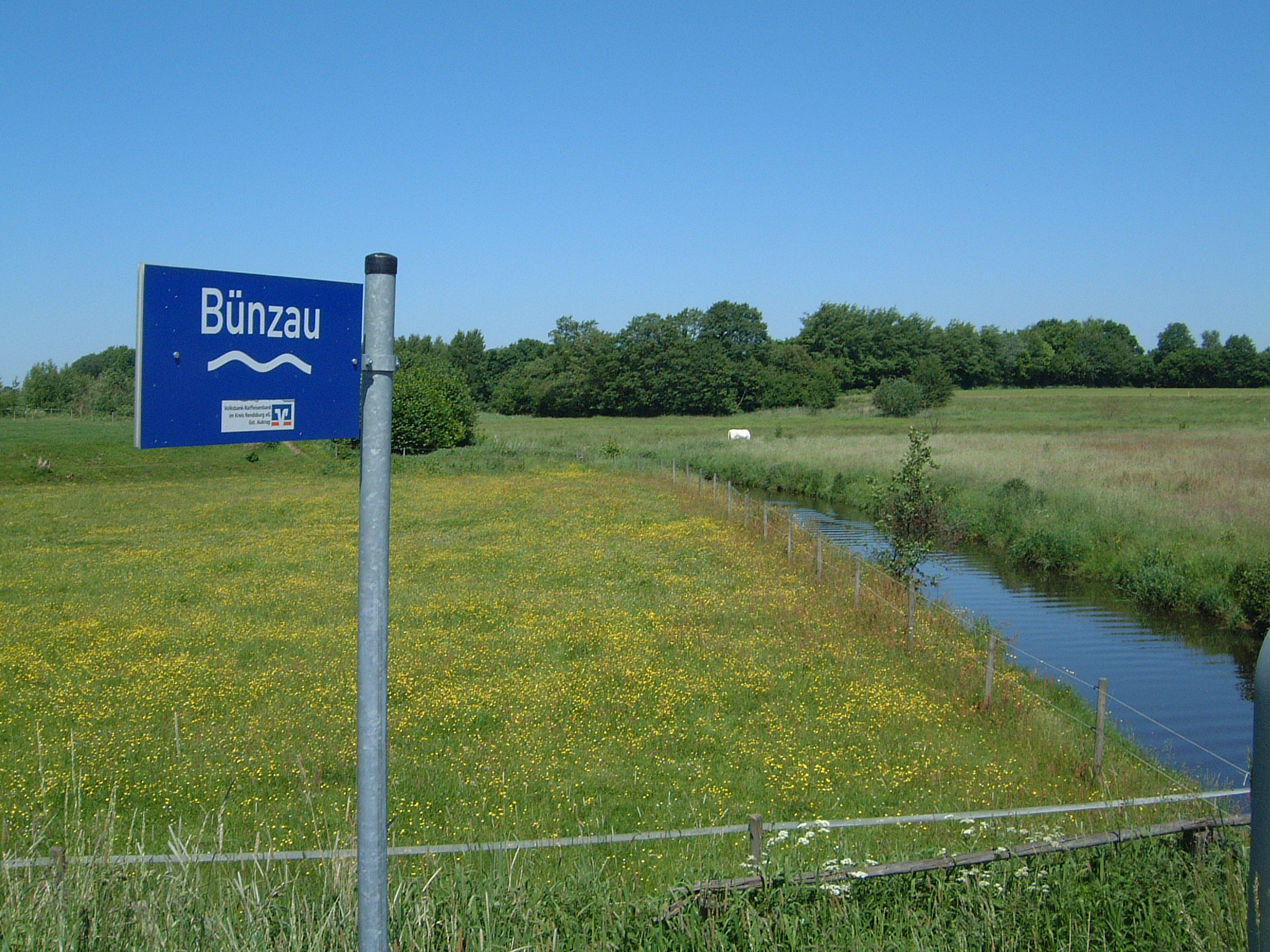

Location
- Country: Germany
- State: Schleswig-Holstein

Physical characteristics
- Mouth
  - location: Stör
  - coordinates: 54.0293°N 9.8153°E

Basin features
- Progression: Stör→ Elbe→ North Sea

Bünzau (German pronunciation: [ˈbʏnt͡saʊ̯]) is a river of Schleswig-Holstein, Germany. It flows into the Stör near Sarlhusen.

The river is approximately 15.7 km long, with a height difference of 10 meters. It originates north of Innien from the confluence of the Buckener Au and Fuhlenau, with the Buckener Au being the longer source river. The Bünzau is a sandy lowland stream. Important tributaries are the Höllenau and Bredenbek. The river's discharge is fed by various pipes and ditch systems.

== History ==
The Bünzau was navigable for the barges used until around 1870. From the Bünzau harbor, wood was transported from Aukrug south to the Stör and further to the Elbe.

== Gallery ==
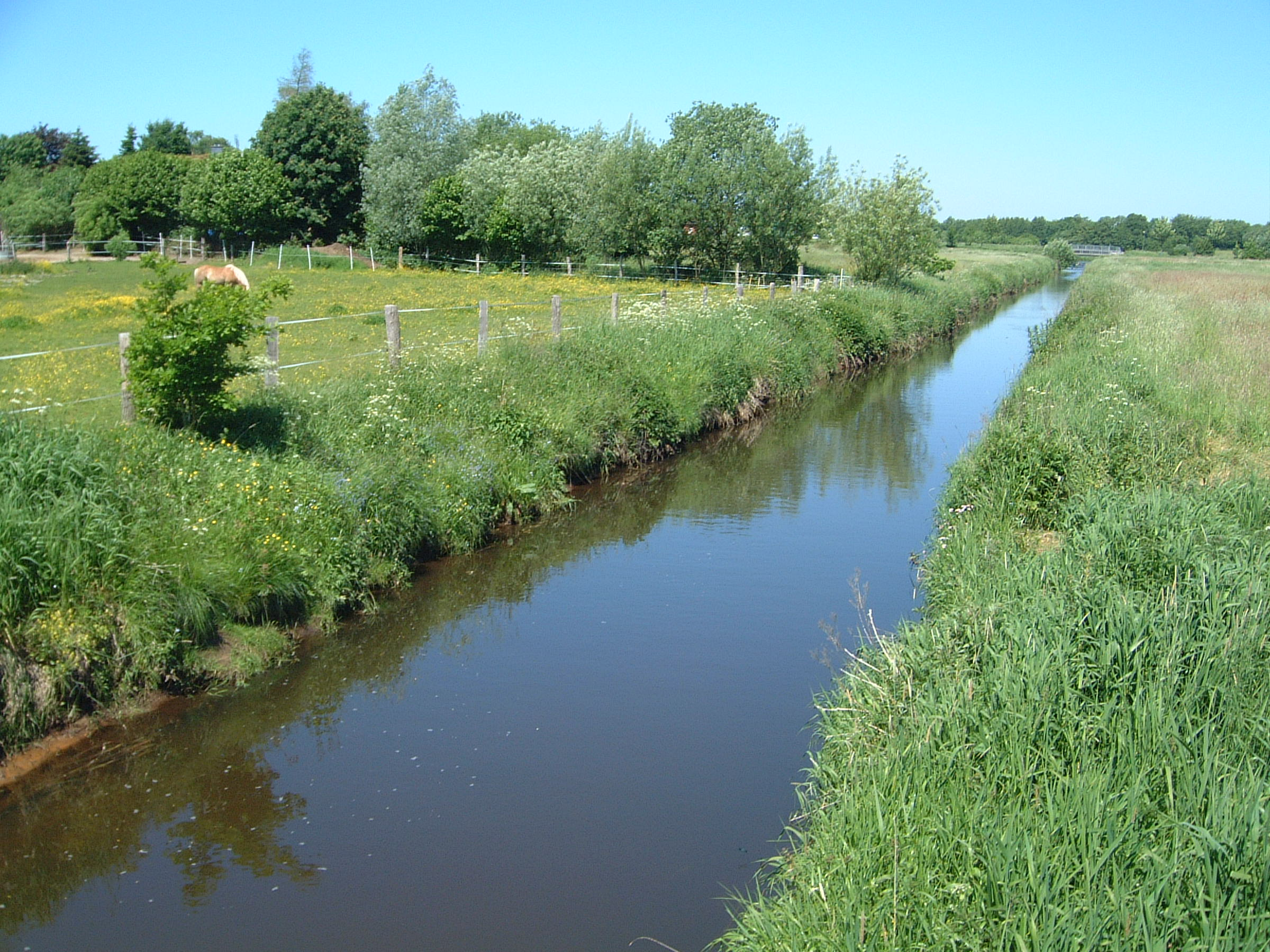
Bünzau River during summer

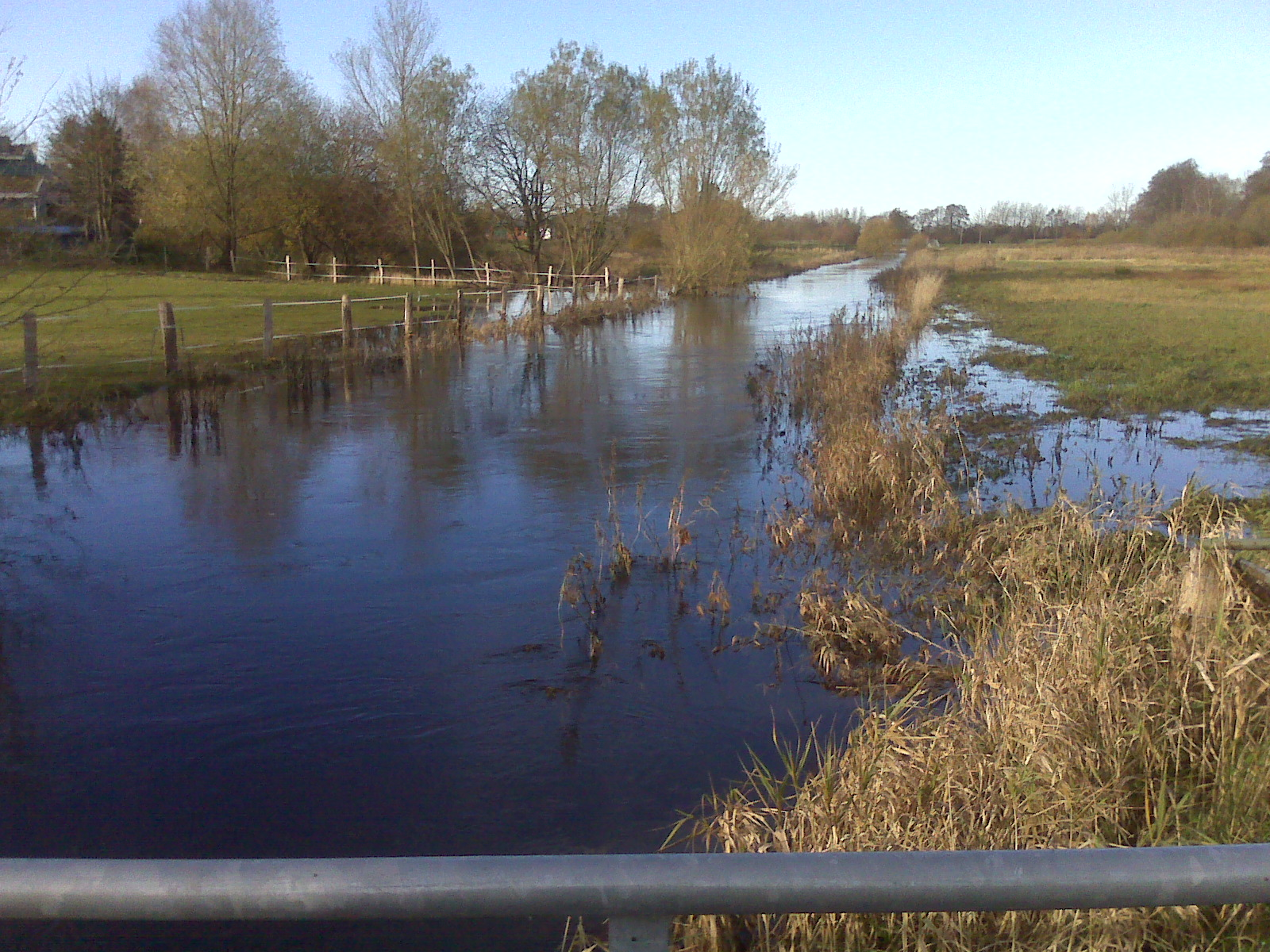
View in Autumn after heavy rain

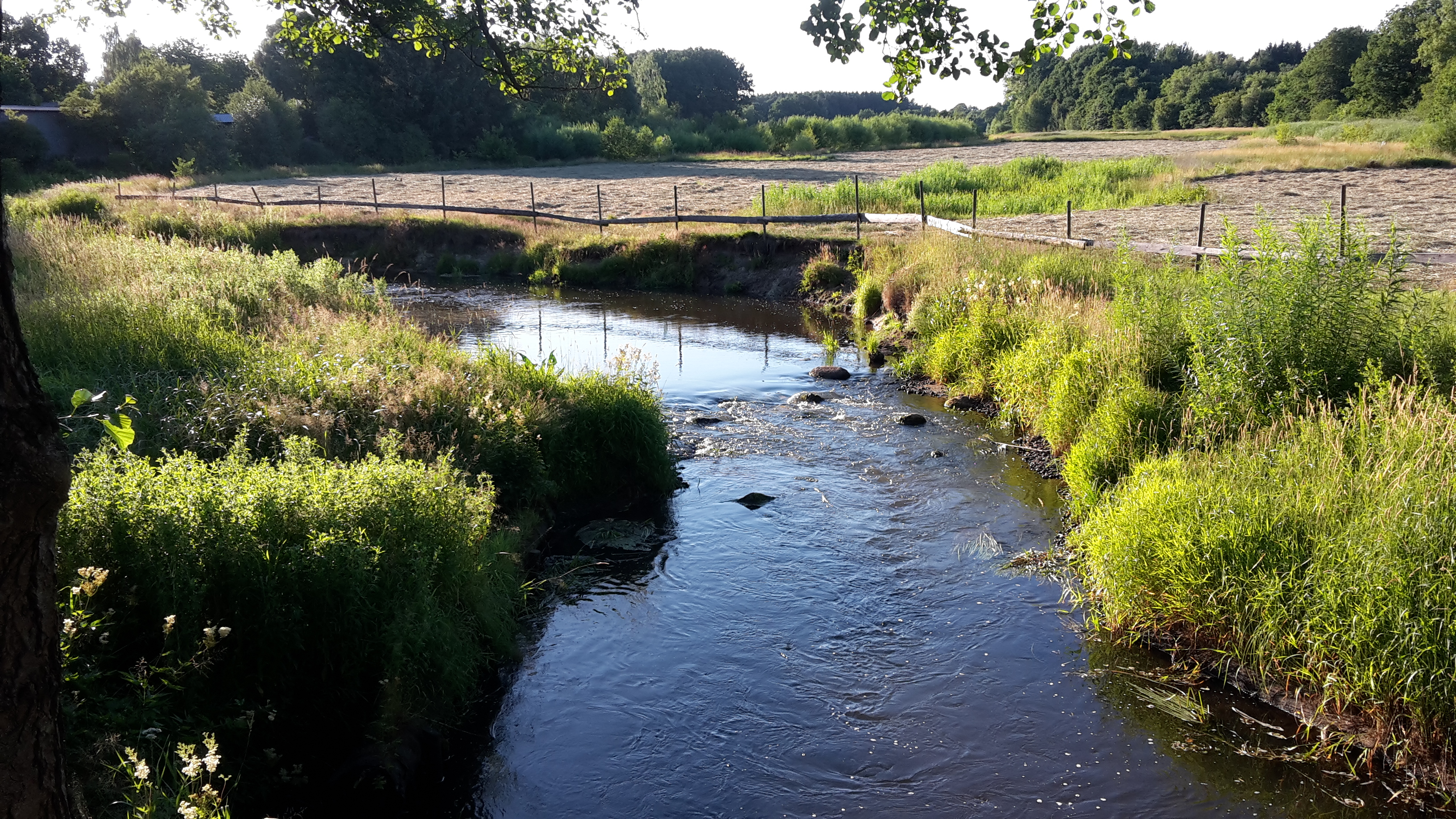
The Bünzau in the district of Aukrug-Bünzen

== See also ==
- List of rivers of Schleswig-Holstein
