= Bredenbek (Bünzau) =

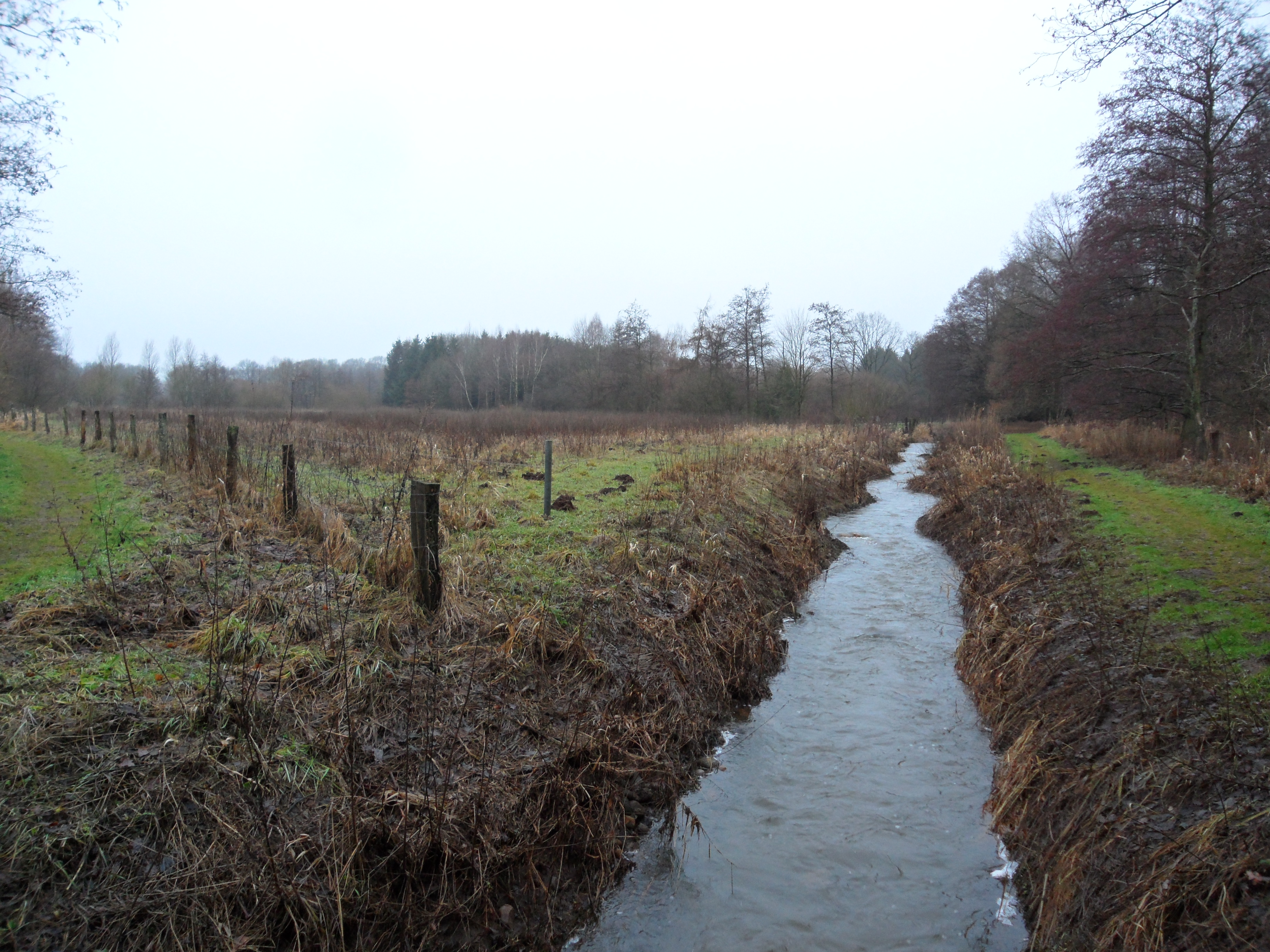

Location
- Country: Germany
- State: Schleswig-Holstein

Physical characteristics
- Mouth
  - location: Bünzau
  - coordinates: 54.0589°N 9.8186°E

Basin features
- Progression: Bünzau→ Stör→ Elbe→ North Sea

The Bredenbek is a tributary of the Bünzau in the north German state of Schleswig-Holstein. The river has a length of about 4 km (2.5 mi). It rises west of Wasbek and discharges into the Bünzau west of Bargfeld.

== See also ==
- List of rivers of Schleswig-Holstein
