= Bundesautobahn 20 =

Federal motorway in Germany

A 20
- Bundesautobahn 20

Route information
- Length: 279 km (173 mi)
- Existed: 1997–present

Major junctions
- East end: Bundesautobahn 11 near Gramzow, Brandenburg
- West end: Bundesautobahn 21 in Bad Segeberg, Schleswig-Holstein

Location
- Country: Germany
- States: Schleswig-Holstein, Mecklenburg-Vorpommern, Brandenburg

Highway system
- Roads in Germany; Autobahns; List; Federal; List; State; E-roads
← A 19	→ A 21

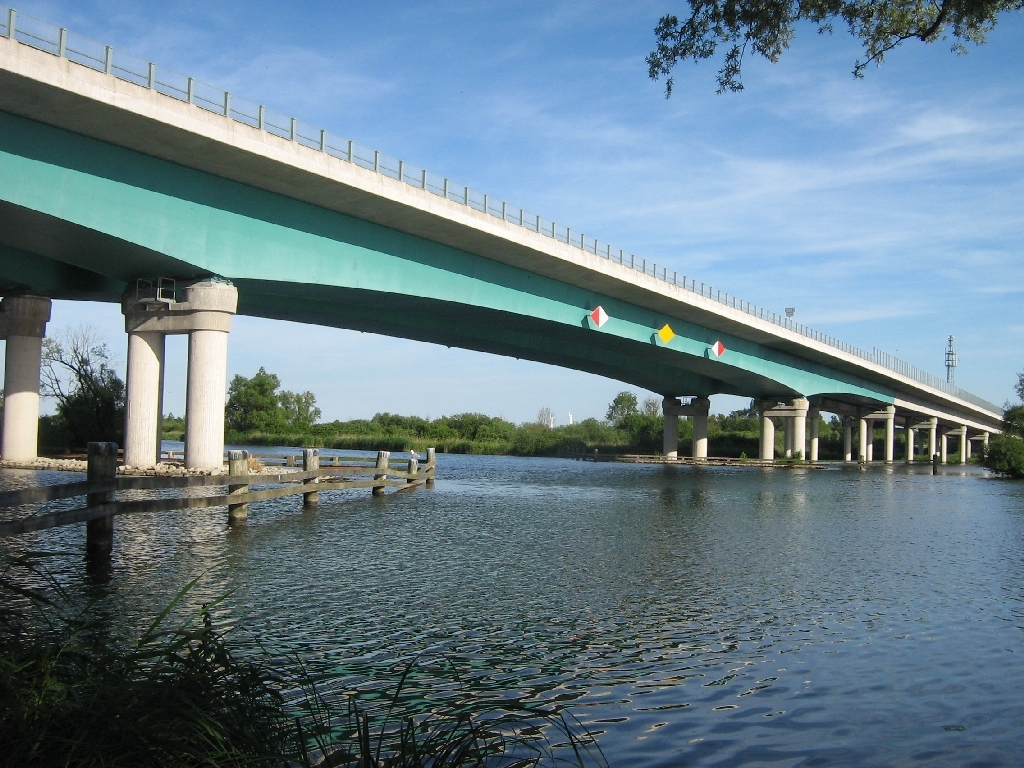
1100m long A20 motorway bridge crossing the river Peene near Jarmen, Mecklenburg-Vorpommern.

Bundesautobahn 20 (translates from German as Federal Motorway 20, short form Autobahn 20, abbreviated as BAB 20 or A 20) is an autobahn in Germany. The western part was initially planned as Bundesautobahn 22. It is colloquially known as Ostseeautobahn ("Baltic Freeway") or Küstenautobahn ("Coastal Freeway") due to its geographic location near the Baltic Sea coastline. The road is not built along a straight line, instead it is built near important cities (Wismar, Rostock, Stralsund), to make it more beneficial for travel between these cities, and also to serve as bypass. On 25 June 2010 the land counsel of Lower Saxony decided that the A22 will be renamed to A20 to show it is a lengthening of the Ostsee- or Küstenautobahn.

Construction started in 1992, only two years after the German reunification, near the junction Wismar-Nord and was completed in December 2005, when the last section was opened near Tribsees by Chancellor Angela Merkel. Building costs are estimated at € 1.8 billion. 279 km of the autobahn are in Mecklenburg-Vorpommern, 27 km in Brandenburg and 30 km in Schleswig-Holstein, making the A 20 the longest continuously built new autobahn since 1945.

On 28 July 2009 the western extension started with the opening between Autobahnkreuz Lübeck and junction Geschendorf. In the meantime the next six kilometers to the temporary end at Weede has been opened for traffic. The extension and opening of the section between the temporary end in Weede and Autobahnkreuz Bad Segeberg is planned for the end of 2010. Further extension west (designated A 22 until June 2010) is planned and awaiting funding, including a tunnel under the Elbe and a 2-way connection with the also-planned A 26.

North of Hamburg the A 20 will have a unique function, namely the connection of the highways A 1, A 21, A 7 and A 23, but it will also function as a northern bypass of the city-region of Hamburg which will take traffic going from France and the Benelux countries to Denmark and Sweden away from Hamburg.

The western part of the A 22 was initially planned as Bundesautobahn 22. It is still in the planning stage and supposed to connect the A 28 near Westerstede with the A 27 near Bremerhaven, crossing the A 29 near Jaderberg . A vital part is the Wesertunnel south of Bremerhaven, which is currently part of Bundesstraße 437. Eastwards of Bremerhaven. The further planning proposes passing Stade and crossing the Elbe river in a tunnel. Details of the trajectory are being discussed in the counties and municipalities involved; the projected start of construction is said to be around 2013.

In April, 2026 the construction of the western part of the A20 in Lower Saxony will start. The first part will be built in Ammerland between the A28 and the A29.

In May 2026, the construction eastside Bad-Segeberg started, the railway will cross the A21.

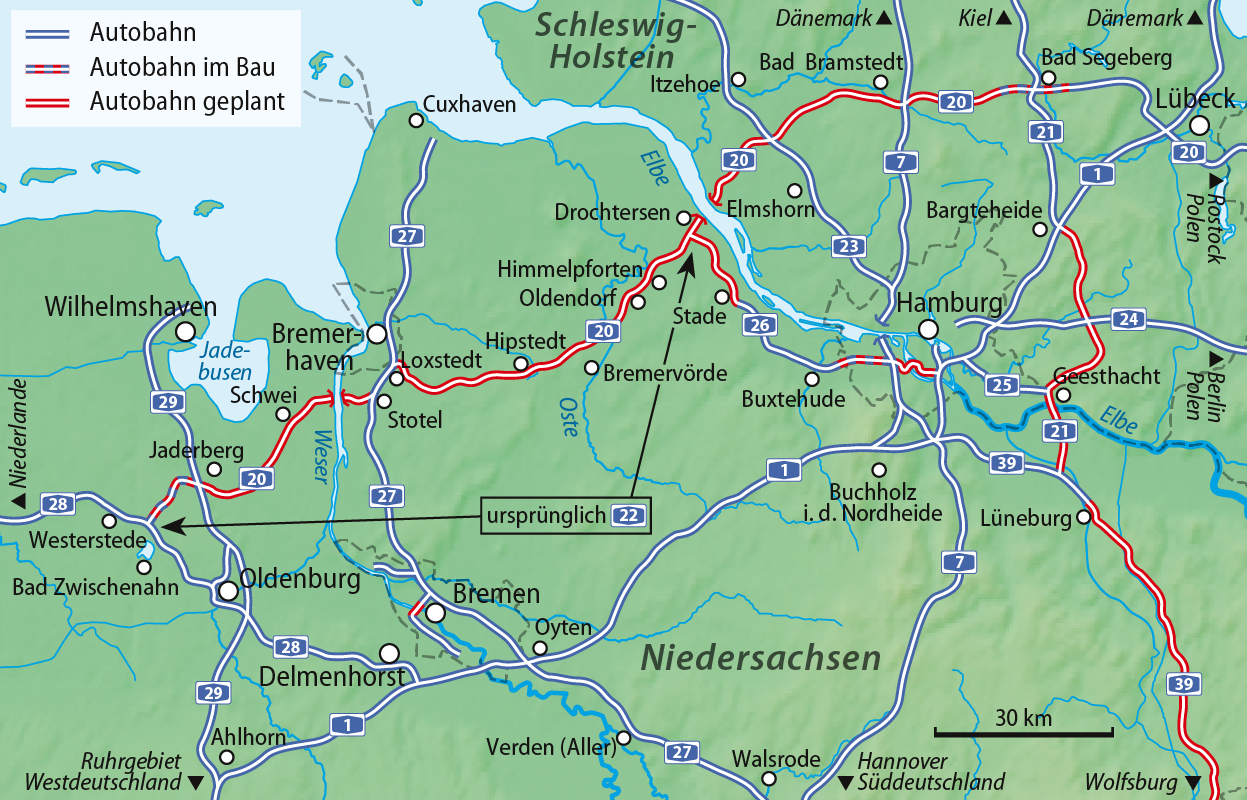
Planned route of the A 20 through Schleswig-Holstein and Lower Saxony

== Exit list ==
State	District	Location	km	mi	Exit	Name	Destinations	Notes
Niedersachsen	Ammerland	Bad Zwischenahn			—	Westerstede interchange	A 28 / E22 – Oldenburg, Leer	proposed western endpoint of motorway proposed interchange
Niedersachsen	Ammerland	Wiefelstede			—	Wiefelstede	Wiefelstede, Spohle	proposed junction
Niedersachsen	Ammerland	Rastede			—	Jaderberg interchange	A 29 – Wilhelmshaven, Oldenburg	proposed interchange
Niedersachsen	Wesermarsch	Ovelgönne			—	Ovelgönne	Ovelgönne	proposed junction
Niedersachsen	Wesermarsch	Stadland			—	Stadland	B 437 – Varel, Rödenkirchen	proposed junction
Niedersachsen	Wesermarsch	Stadland			—	Nordenham	B 212 – Nordenham, Delmenhorst; B 437 – Rödenkirchen	proposed rebuild of existing junction
Niedersachsen	Weser	Unterweser			Tunnel	Weser Tunnel	Weser river	proposed route through existing tunnel
Niedersachsen	Cuxhaven (district)	Loxstedt			—	Dedesdorf	Dedesdorf	proposed rebuild of existing junction
Niedersachsen	Cuxhaven (district)	Loxstedt			—/11	Stotel interchange	A 27 / E234 – Bremen, Hannover	proposed rebuild of existing junction proposed concurrency with A 27 motorway (southern terminus)
Niedersachsen	Cuxhaven (district)	Loxstedt			10	Bremerhaven-Süd	B 6 – Bremerhaven-Süd, Bremerhaven-Fischereihafen; Nesse	junction exists as part of A 27 motorway
Niedersachsen	Cuxhaven (district)	Loxstedt			—/9	Loxstedt interchange	A 27 – Bremerhaven, Cuxhaven	proposed rebuild of existing junction proposed concurrency with A 27 motorway (northern terminus)
Niedersachsen	Cuxhaven (district)	Beverstedt			—	Beverstedt-West	B 71 – Beverstedt	proposed junction
Niedersachsen	Cuxhaven (district)	Beverstedt			—	Beverstedt-Ost	Freisdorf, Appeln	proposed junction
Niedersachsen	Rotenburg (Wümme)	Oerel			—	Bremervörde	B 495 – Hemmoor, Bremervörde	proposed junction
Niedersachsen	Stade (district)	Estorf			—	Oldendorf	Oldendorf	proposed junction
Niedersachsen	Stade (district)	Burweg			—	Himmelpforten	B 73 – Himmelpforten, Cuxhaven	proposed junction
Niedersachsen	Stade (district)	Drochtersen			—	Kehdingen interchange	A 26 – Stade, Hamburg; B 73 – Cuxhaven	proposed interchange
Elbe	Niederelbe				Tunnel	Elbtunnel	Elbe river	proposed tunnel
Schleswig-Holstein	Steinburg	Herzhorn			—	Glückstadt	B 431 – Glückstadt, Brunsbüttel, Elmshorn	proposed junction
Schleswig-Holstein	Steinburg	Süderau			—	Krempe	Krempe	proposed junction
Schleswig-Holstein	Steinburg	Horst			—	Hohenfelde interchange	A 23 – Hamburg, Itzehoe, Heide	proposed interchange
Schleswig-Holstein	Pinneberg	Bokel			—	Bokel	Bokel	proposed junction
Schleswig-Holstein	Segeberg	Lentföhrden			—	Lentföhrden	B 4 – Bad Bramstedt, Quickborn	proposed junction
Schleswig-Holstein	Segeberg	Lentföhrden			—	Bad Bramstedt interchange	A 7 / E45 – Flensburg, Kiel, Hamburg	proposed junction
Schleswig-Holstein	Segeberg	Hartenholm			—	Hartenholm	Struvenhütten, Hartenholm	proposed junction
Schleswig-Holstein	Segeberg	Wittenborn			—	Wittenborn	Wittenborn, Wahlstedt	proposed junction
Schleswig-Holstein	Segeberg	Högersdorf			—	Bad Segeberg interchange	A 21 – Kiel, Lüneburg	proposed interchange
Schleswig-Holstein	Segeberg	Bad Segeberg			—	Bad Segeberg-Ost	B 206 – Bad Segeberg	proposed junction
Schleswig-Holstein	Segeberg	Bad Segeberg			—	transition from federal road	B 206 – Bad Segeberg, Itzehoe	Transition from B 206 Current western endpoint of motorway
Schleswig-Holstein	Segeberg	Weede			Rest area	Kronsburg	Kronsburg rest area	
Schleswig-Holstein	Segeberg	Geschendorf			—	Geschendorf	Geschendorf	
Schleswig-Holstein	Stormarn	Mönkhagen			—	Mönkhagen	Mönkhagen, Stockelsdorf	
Schleswig-Holstein	Stormarn	Hamberge			1	Lübeck interchange	A 1 / E22 / E47 – Hamburg, Reinfeld, Fehmarn, Puttgarden, Lübeck	western End of concurrency with european route E22
Schleswig-Holstein	Lübeck	Moisling			Tunnel	Tunnel Moisling	under Lübeck–Hamburg railway	length: 120 m
Schleswig-Holstein	Lübeck	Sankt Jürgen			Bridge	river bridge	over Elbe-Lübeck Canal	length: 180 m
Schleswig-Holstein	Lübeck	Sankt Jürgen			2a	Lübeck-Genin	Lübeck-Genin	
Schleswig-Holstein	Lübeck	Sankt Jürgen			Rest area	Auf dem Karkfeld	Auf dem Karkfeld rest area	
Schleswig-Holstein	Herzogtum Lauenburg	Groß Sarau			2b	Lübeck-Süd	B 207 – Lübeck-Süd, Lübeck Airport, Krummesse, Lüneburg, Ratzeburg, ( A 24)	
Schleswig-Holstein	Herzogtum Lauenburg	Groß Sarau			3	Groß Sarau	Groß Sarau, Groß Grönau	
Mecklenburg-Vorpommern	Nordwestmecklenburg	Lüdersdorf			4	Lüdersdorf	Lüdersdorf, Carlow	
Mecklenburg-Vorpommern	Nordwestmecklenburg	Siemz-Niendorf			Rest area	Schönberger Land	Schönberger Land rest area	
Mecklenburg-Vorpommern	Nordwestmecklenburg	Schönberg			5	Schönberg	B 104 – Schönberg, Schwerin, Gadebusch, Rehna	Schwerin is only signed eastbound
Mecklenburg-Vorpommern	Nordwestmecklenburg	Upahl			6	Grevesmühlen	Grevesmühlen, Boltenhagen, Mühlen, Eichsen	
Mecklenburg-Vorpommern	Nordwestmecklenburg	Upahl			Rest area	Bretthäger Wisch	Bretthäger Wisch rest area	
Mecklenburg-Vorpommern	Nordwestmecklenburg	Bobitz			7	Bobitz	Bobitz, Bad Kleinen, Gressow	
Mecklenburg-Vorpommern	Nordwestmecklenburg	Barnekow			Rest area	Mölenbarg	Mölenbarg rest area	
Mecklenburg-Vorpommern	Nordwestmecklenburg	Dorf Mecklenburg			8	Wismar-Mitte	B 208 / B 106 – Wismar-Mitte, Schwerin	
Mecklenburg-Vorpommern	Nordwestmecklenburg	Hornstorf			9	Wismar interchange	A 14 – Dresden, Berlin, Schwerin, Insel Poel, Wismar	
Mecklenburg-Vorpommern	Nordwestmecklenburg	Zurow			10	Zurow	B 192 – Zurow, Sternberg	
Mecklenburg-Vorpommern	Nordwestmecklenburg	Zurow			Rest area	Selliner See	Selliner See rest area	
Mecklenburg-Vorpommern	Nordwestmecklenburg	Glasin			11	Neukloster	Neukloster, Glasin	
Mecklenburg-Vorpommern	Nordwestmecklenburg	Glasin			Rest area	Fuchsberg	Fuchsberg rest area	
Mecklenburg-Vorpommern	Rostock	Jürgenshagen			12	Kröpelin	Kröpelin, Kühlungsborn, Bützow, Satow	
Mecklenburg-Vorpommern	Rostock	Satow			Rest area	Fuchsberg	Fuchsberg rest area	
Mecklenburg-Vorpommern	Rostock	Ziesendorf			13	Bad Doberan	Bad Doberan, Schwaan	
Mecklenburg-Vorpommern	Rostock	Ziesendorf			14	Rostock-West	B 103 – Rostock-West, Rostock-Warnemünde, Rostock-Zentrum, Rostock-Überseehafen (toll)	Überseehafen is only signed eastbound tolled destination goes through the Warnow Tunnel
Mecklenburg-Vorpommern	Rostock	Polchow			15	Rostock-Südstadt	Rostock-Südstadt	
Mecklenburg-Vorpommern	Rostock	Dummerstorf			Rest area	Warnowtal	Warnowtal rest area	
Mecklenburg-Vorpommern	Rostock	Dummerstorf			16	Rostock interchange	A 19 / E55 – Berlin, Rostock-Überseehafen, Rostock-Warnemünde (toll), Rostock-Ost	Warnemünde is only signed westbound tolled destination goes through the Warnow Tunnel
Mecklenburg-Vorpommern	Rostock	Dummerstorf			17	Dummerstorf	Dummerstorf, Waldeck	
Mecklenburg-Vorpommern	Rostock	Sanitz			Rest area	Speckmoor	Speckmoor rest area	
Mecklenburg-Vorpommern	Rostock	Sanitz			18	Sanitz	B 110 – Sanitz, Ribnitz-Damgarten, Tessin, Marlow	Marlow is only signed eastbound
Mecklenburg-Vorpommern	Rostock	Thelkow			19	Tessin	B 110 – Tessin, Dargun, Gnioen, Demmin	Dargun, Gnoien and Demmin are only signed eastbound
Mecklenburg-Vorpommern	Rostock	Grammow			Rest area	Lindholz	Lindholz rest area	
Mecklenburg-Vorpommern	Vorpommern-Rügen	Lindholz			20	Bad Sülze	Bad Sülze, Barth, Gnoien	Gnoien is only signed westbound
Mecklenburg-Vorpommern	Vorpommern-Rügen	Tribsees			21	Tribsees	Tribsees, Richtenberg, Marlow	Marlow is only signed westbound
Mecklenburg-Vorpommern	Vorpommern-Rügen	Gransebieth			Rest area	Trebeltal	Trebeltal rest area	
Mecklenburg-Vorpommern	Vorpommern-Rügen	Wendisch Baggendorf			22	Grimmen-West	Grimmen-West, Glewitz	
Mecklenburg-Vorpommern	Vorpommern-Rügen	Süderholz			23	Grimmen-Ost	B 194 – Grimmen-Ost, Demmin, Loitz, Süderholz-Poggendorf	
Mecklenburg-Vorpommern	Vorpommern-Rügen	Süderholz			24	Stralsund	B 96 / E22 / E251 – Stralsund, Sassnitz, Insel Rügen	eastern end of concurrency with european route E22 western end of concurrency with european route E251
Mecklenburg-Vorpommern	Vorpommern-Rügen	Süderholz			Rest area	Riedbruch	Riedbruch rest area	
Mecklenburg-Vorpommern	Vorpommern-Rügen	Süderholz			25	Greifswald	B 109 – Greifswald, Süderholz-Poggendorf	
Mecklenburg-Vorpommern	Vorpommern-Greifswald	Görmin			26	Dersekow	Dersekow, Loitz	
Mecklenburg-Vorpommern	Vorpommern-Greifswald	Görmin			Rest area	Peenetal	Peenetal rest area	
Mecklenburg-Vorpommern	Vorpommern-Greifswald	Gützkow			27	Gützkow	B 111 – Gützkow, Insel Usedom, Wolgast, Greifswald-Süd	Usedom is only signed eastbound Greifswald-Süd is only signed westbound
Mecklenburg-Vorpommern	Vorpommern-Greifswald	Jarmen			28	Jarmen	B 110 – Jarmen, Dargun, Demmin, Anklam-Nord	Anklam-Nord is only signed eastbound
Mecklenburg-Vorpommern	Vorpommern-Greifswald	Völschow			Rest area	Demminer Land	Demminer Land rest area	
Mecklenburg-Vorpommern	Mecklenburgische Seenplatte	Breest			29	Anklam	B 199 – Anklam, Burow, Insel Usedom	Insel Usedom is only signed westbound
Mecklenburg-Vorpommern	Mecklenburgische Seenplatte	Werder			30	Altentreptow	Altentreptow, Werder, Stavenhagen	
Mecklenburg-Vorpommern	Mecklenburgische Seenplatte	Brunn			31	Neubrandenburg-Nord	Neubrandenburg-Nord, Neubrandenburg Airport, Friedland i.M., Brunn	Friedland in Mecklenburg is only signed eastbound
Mecklenburg-Vorpommern	Mecklenburgische Seenplatte	Neverin			Rest area	Vier-Tore-Stadt	Vier-Tore-Stadt rest area	
Mecklenburg-Vorpommern	Mecklenburgische Seenplatte	Friedland			32	Neubrandenburg-Nord	B 110 / E251 – Neubrandenburg-Ost, Neubrandenburg-Zentrum, Glienke	eastern end of concurrency with european route E251
Mecklenburg-Vorpommern	Mecklenburgische Seenplatte	Groß Miltzow			33	Friedland i.M.	Friedland i.M., Neustrelitz, Woldegk	
Mecklenburg-Vorpommern	Mecklenburgische Seenplatte	Groß Miltzow			Rest area	Brohmer Berge	Brohmer Berge rest area	
Mecklenburg-Vorpommern	Mecklenburgische Seenplatte	Schönhausen			34	Strasburg (Uckermark)	Strasburg (Uckermark)	
Mecklenburg-Vorpommern	Vorpommern-Greifswald	Strasburg (Uckermark)			Rest area	Ravensmühle	Ravensmühle rest area	
Mecklenburg-Vorpommern	Vorpommern-Greifswald	Papendorf			35	Pasewalk-Nord	B 110 – Pasewalk-Nord, Ueckermünde, Torgelow	Ueckermünde and Torgelow are only signed eastbound
Mecklenburg-Vorpommern	Vorpommern-Greifswald	Rollwitz			36	Pasewalk-Süd	B 109 – Pasewalk-Süd, Ueckermünde, Torgelow, Prenzlau	Ueckermünde and Torgelow are only signed westbound Prenzlau is only signed eastbound
Brandenburg	Uckermark	Schönfeld			Rest area	Klockow	Klockow rest area	
Brandenburg	Uckermark	Rollwitz			37	Prenzlau-Ost	Prenzlau-Ost, Brüssow	
Brandenburg	Uckermark	Grünow			38	Prenzlau-Süd	Prenzlau-Süd, Grünow, Eickstedt	
Brandenburg	Uckermark	Uckerfelde			39	Uckermark interchange	A 11 / E28 – Berlin, Szczecin (PL)	
Brandenburg	Uckermark	Uckerfelde			—	transition to federal road	B 166 – Schwedt	eastern endpoint of motorway
1.000 mi = 1.609 km; 1.000 km = 0.621 mi: Concurrency terminus; Proposed; Route transition
