= Bundesstraße 206 =

Federal highway in Germany

B 206
- Bundesstraße 206

Route information
- Length: 85 km (53 mi)

Major junctions
- West end: Itzehoe
- East end: Bad Segeberg

Location
- Country: Germany
- States: Schleswig-Holstein

Highway system
- Roads in Germany; Autobahns; List; Federal; List; State; E-roads

The Bundesstraße 206 is a German federal road or Bundesstraße and the west–east link between Itzehoe and Lübeck in the southern part of the state of Schleswig-Holstein.

== Route ==
The B 206 begins in the city of Itzehoe at a junction with the A 23 motorway and the B 5 road. In the eastern part of Itzehoe it crosses the B 5 road. Afterwards it continues east and meets the B 4 road at the Bad Bramstedt bypass. It then meets the A 7 motorway. After that it crosses the A 21 motorway near Bad Segeberg. It then enters Bad Segeberg with a junction with the B 432 road. East of Bad Segeberg the road continues as the A 20 motorway.

== Major junctions ==
State	District	Location	km	mi	Exit	Name	Destinations	Notes
Schleswig-Holstein	Steinburg	Itzehoe				Itzehoe-Mitte	B 5 – Hamburg, Brunsbüttel; B 204 – Heide	former junction of the B 5/B 204
Schleswig-Holstein	Steinburg	Itzehoe			9	Itzehoe-Mitte	A 23 – Hamburg, Heide; B 5 – Brunsbüttel, Wilster	
Schleswig-Holstein	Steinburg	Itzehoe				Itzehoe-Sandberg	B 77 – Flensburg, Rendsburg	cross-level intersection
Schleswig-Holstein	Steinburg	No junctions along Hohenlockstedt and Mühlenbarbek						
Schleswig-Holstein	Steinburg	Kellinghusen				Kellinghusen	Kellinghusen, Wittenbergen	one-quadrant interchange
Schleswig-Holstein	No junctions along Wrist and Föhrden-Bahl							
Schleswig-Holstein	Segeberg	Bad Bramstedt				Bad Bramstedt-Liethberg	B 4 – Hamburg, Neumünster, Kiel	former intersection with the B 4
Schleswig-Holstein	Segeberg	Bad Bramstedt				Bad Bramstedt-Kieler Straße	Neumünster, Bad Bramstedt; Flensburg, Kiel ( A 7)	one-quadrant interchange intersection with former B 4 road
Schleswig-Holstein	Segeberg	Bad Bramstedt				Bad Bramstedt-Bimöhler Straße	Bad Bramstedt, Boostedt	one-quadrant interchange
Schleswig-Holstein	Segeberg	Bad Bramstedt				Bad Bramstedt-Lohstücker Weg	B 4 – Hamburg, Bad Bramstedt	cross-level intersection Hamburg is only signed eastbound
Schleswig-Holstein	Segeberg	Bad Bramstedt			17	Bad Bramstedt	A 7 / E45 – Hamburg, Flensburg	
Schleswig-Holstein	Segeberg	No junctions along Hasenmoor, Fuhlenrüe and Schafhaus						
Schleswig-Holstein	Segeberg	Bark				Wittenborn-West	A 20 – Lübeck	temporary intersection with A 20 motorway planned
Schleswig-Holstein	Segeberg	No junctions along Wittenborn						
Schleswig-Holstein	Segeberg	Högersdorf				Rotenhahn	B 432 – Hamburg	roundabout planned
Schleswig-Holstein	Segeberg	Bad Segeberg			12	Bad Segeberg-Nord	A 21 – Kiel, Hamburg, Berlin	junction will be demolished along the A 20 extension
Schleswig-Holstein	Segeberg	Bad Segeberg				Bad Segeberg-Am Wasserwerk	B 205 – Flensburg, Kiel	intersection with former B 205 road
Schleswig-Holstein	Segeberg	Bad Segeberg				Bad Segeberg-Hamburger Straße	B 432 – Hamburg, Puttgarden	
Schleswig-Holstein	Segeberg	Bad Segeberg				Bad Segeberg-Am Landratspark	Bad Segeberg-Zentrum	
Schleswig-Holstein	Segeberg	Bad Segeberg				Bad Segeberg-Oldesloher Straße	Bad Oldesloe, Klein Gladebrügge	
Schleswig-Holstein	Segeberg	Bad Segeberg				Bad Segeberg-Ost	A 20 – Lübeck, Itzehoe	junction planned
Schleswig-Holstein	Segeberg	Weede				Bad Segeberg-Ost	Bad Oldesloe, Mielsdorf, Weede	
Schleswig-Holstein	Segeberg	Bad Segeberg				transition to motorway	A 20 – Lübeck	transition to A 20 motorway
Schleswig-Holstein	Segeberg	former route No junctions along Weede, Steinbek and Geschendorf						
Schleswig-Holstein	Segeberg	Geschendorf				Geschendorf	A 20 – Lübeck, Bad Segeberg	former route of the B 206 The A 20 didn't run here before the downgrade of the B 206
Schleswig-Holstein	No junctions along Strukdorf, Langniendorf and Mönkhagen							
Schleswig-Holstein	Stormarn	Mönkhagen				Mönkhagen	A 20 – Lübeck, Bad Segeberg	former route of the B 206 The A 20 didn't run here before the downgrade of the B 206
Schleswig-Holstein	Ostholstein	Stockelsdorf				Eckhorst	Eckhorst	former route of the B 206
Schleswig-Holstein	No junctions along Stockelsdorf							
Schleswig-Holstein	Lübeck	Sankt Lorenz Nord			22	Lübeck-Zentrum	A 1 / E47 – Puttgarden, Lübeck-Travemünde, Hamburg, Rostock ( A 20)	former route of the B 206
1.000 mi = 1.609 km; 1.000 km = 0.621 mi: Closed/former; Proposed; Route transition

== See also ==
- List of federal roads in Germany
