= Bundesautobahn 19 =

Federal motorway in Germany

A 19
- Bundesautobahn 19

Route information
- Length: 124 km (77 mi)

Major junctions
- North end: Baltic port of Rostock
- B 105
- South end: A 24 near Berlin

Location
- Country: Germany
- States: Mecklenburg-Vorpommern, Brandenburg

Highway system
- Roads in Germany; Autobahns; List; Federal; List; State; E-roads
← A 17	→ A 20

Bundesautobahn 19 (translates from German as Federal Motorway 19, short form Autobahn 19, abbreviated as BAB 19 or A 19) is an autobahn in eastern Germany that connects the Baltic port of Rostock to the A 24, which continues to the A 10 ring road around Berlin. The Warnowtunnel is the only stretch of autobahn so far that requires the payment of a general road toll for all vehicles.

== Exit list ==
	Tunnel Warnowtunnel 790 m, toll road
(4)	Rostock-Überseehafen
	Bahnbrücke 100 m
(5)	Rostock-Nord
(6)	Rostock-Ost B 105
	Bahnbrücke 70 m
(7)	Rostock-Süd B 110
(8)	Kessin B 103
(9)	Rostock 4-way interchange A 20 E22
(10)	Kavelstorf
	Bahnbrücke 60 m
	parking area
	parking area
(11)	Laage B 103
	Services Recknitznierung
(12)	Glasewitz
	parking area
(13)	Güstrow B 104
	parking area
	Bansower Forst
(14)	Krakow am See
	parking area
(15)	Linstow
	Kiether Berg (planned)
	Nossentiner Heide/Schwinzer Heide (planned)
(16)	Malchow B 192
(17)	Waren (Müritz) B 192
	Rest area Müritz (planned)
	parking area
(18)	Röbe/Müritz B 198
	Rest area Eldetal
	Grünbrücke Wredenhagen (planned)
	Wredenhagen (planned)
(20)	Wittstock/Dosse B 189
(21)	Wittstock/Dosse 3-way interchange A 24 E26 E55
