= Ollndorf =

- Ortsteil of Siemz-Niendorf
- Interactive map of Ollndorf
- Location within Germany Location within Mecklenburg-Vorpommern
- Coordinates: 53°47′42″N 10°53′31″E
- Country: Germany
- State: Mecklenburg-Vorpommern
- District: Nordwestmecklenburg
- Municipality: Siemz-Niendorf
- Time zone: UTC+01:00 (CET)
  - Summer (DST): UTC+02:00 (CEST)
- Postal codes: 23923
- Dialling codes: 038828
- Vehicle registration: NWM
- Website: www.schoenberg-land.de

Ollndorf is a small village in Germany and belongs to the municipality Siemz-Niendorf and is located on west of the Landkreis Nordwestmecklenburg which is in the federal state of Mecklenburg-Vorpommern.

== Geography ==
Ollndorf lies south of Niendorf, about six kilometres southwest from Schönberg and 15 kilometres southwest from downtown Lübeck. The area falls from about 30 to 15 m over NHN until 500 meters east of the settlements up to the river Maurine (stream).

== History ==
Ollndorf's first documented mention is in 1194 A.D. in the Isfriedschen Teilungsvertrag as Bistenowe, and it was later named Oldendorf.

In 1933 Ollndorf had 101 inhabitants; this figure dropped until 1939 to 84.

On July 1, 1950 the surrounding municipalities of Niendorf, Bechelsdorf, Klein Siemz, Ollndorf und Törpt were merged to just one named Gemeinde Niendorf.

== Infrastructure ==
About 350 meters west lies the country road 1 starting in Schönberg and reaching to the border of Ratzeburg. There are buses to the nearest town Schönberg. The connection to the nearest highway Bundesautobahn 20 lies about 6 km away next from the village Lüdersdorf. The closest train connection to the nearby Route: Lübeck – Bad Kleinen can be accessed over Schönberg or also over Lüdersdorf.

Ollndorf belongs to the school catchment area of Schönberg.

== Celebrities ==
The farmer poet Wilhelm Bade (1841–1928) lived in Ollndorf. He dedicated the poem De ohle Katenschult to Franz Maaß (born 1774), who was mayor (in old German Schultzen) of the municipality at that time and whose nickname was "Katenschult".
