= Elbe Crossing =

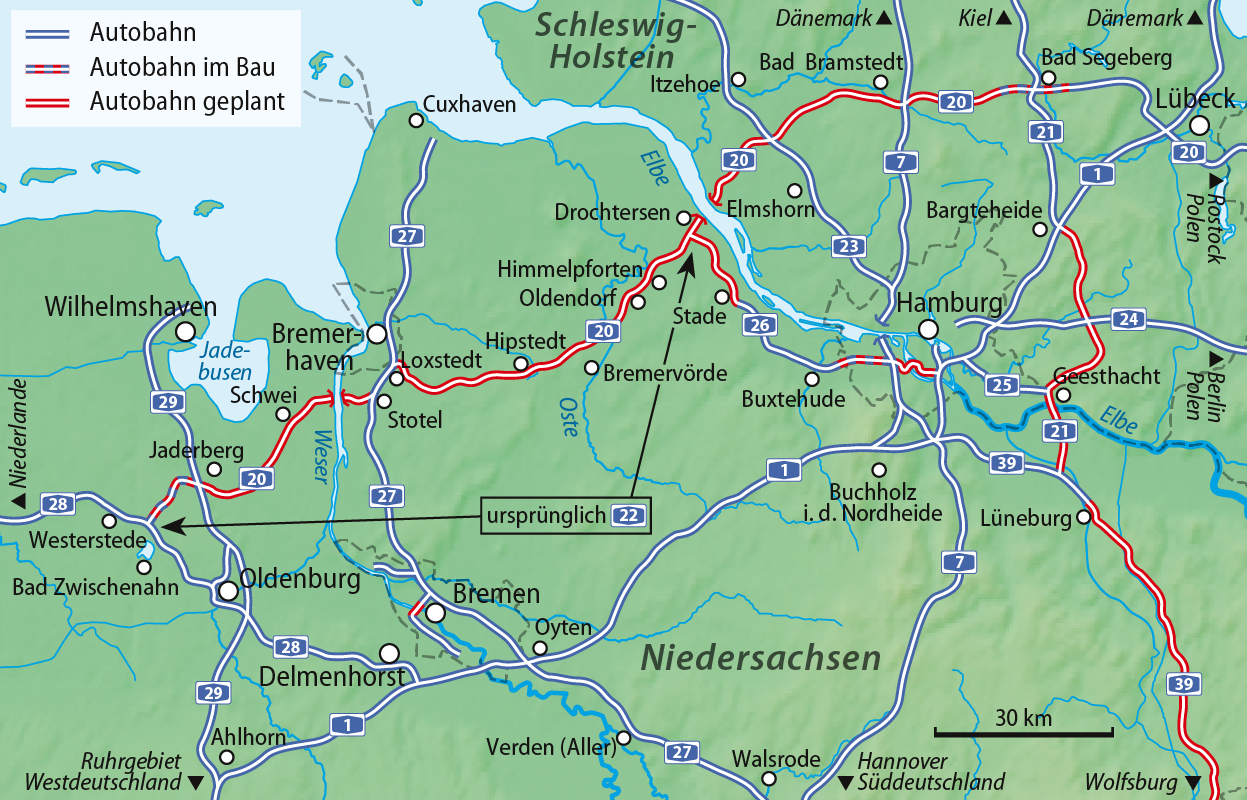
Planned course of Bundesautobahn 20 in Schleswig-Holstein and Lower Saxony with Elbe crossing

The Elbe crossing (German: Elbquerung) is a planned fixed transport link across the lower Elbe between Hamburg and the North Sea. The crossing is expected to enable the westward extension of the coastal Bundesautobahn 20 to join Bundesautobahn 26 and on to Bremerhaven and the Weser tunnel. The link is planned to cross the Elbe between Glückstadt in Schleswig-Holstein and Drochtersen in Lower Saxony, to form part of the North West Bypass of Hamburg and improve the road connections along the Amsterdam–Copenhagen transport corridor. This is a joint project of the states of Lower Saxony and Schleswig-Holstein. The crossing is proposed to be a 6.5-kilometer (4.0 mi) tunnel under the Elbe, and is expected to cost about 1.3 billion euros. If the tunnel is built, it would be the second longest road tunnel in Germany.

== Planning ==
On 14 May 2002 the Government of Schleswig-Holstein argued for the preferential alignment with Elbe crossing near Glückstadt/Drochtersen. In July 2003, all sections of the Bundesautobahn 20, including the Elbe crossing were classified under "urgent need" in the Federal Transport Infrastructure Plan 2003. Preliminary studies were completed in early 2003. The route determination by the Federal Ministry of Transport, Building and Urban Development was made (BMVBS) on July 28 of 2005. The Ministry called a technical feasibility study with regard to possible variants of a fixed Elbe crossing, where both tunnel and bridge solutions were compared. The associated feasibility study included comprehensive investigations with final reviews of various crossing solutions (boring, immersed tube tunnel and high bridge variants). The study concluded that due to the difficult ground conditions, a tunnel would have to be a bored tunnel using the shield tunneling method. The building design for the tunnel was approved by the BMVBS on 19 December 2008, with the building design for the tunnel approved on June 3 of 2009.

== Construction ==
The tunnel will be built with two tunnel boring machines from north to south. The entire construction is currently calculated at around six years. Construction was planned for 2012, however, this depends on the procurement procedures and the provision of federal funds. In the coalition agreement of the current government of Schleswig-Holstein under Torsten Albig between SPD, Greens and SSW, which was confirmed on 9 June 2012 by the three parties, is the construction of the Elbe tunnel would begin in this legislative period, but a start date was postponed until 2017. Similarly, the new agreed regional government in Lower Saxony of the SPD and Greens under Stephan Weil in the coalition agreement February 2013 launched a review of the need for the Elbe crossing. The current planning would therefore be continued only with limited use of resources.

== Details ==
The tunnel is the second longest planned with a 6.5 km road tunnel and will be the longest underwater tunnel in Germany. It is designed as a twin-tube tunnel with two lanes in each tunnel tube with reduced hard shoulder. The tunnel is to be made with a circular cross section, which is made of prefabricated concrete elements with 20 cross passages.

== Construction costs ==
Currently, the building is still in a planning phase. Therefore, changes may occur to the estimated cost of construction, as listed below. It is also crucial if only the cost of the tunnel are given or the adjacent sections are also included.

date Those cost estimate 15.09.2008 Answer of the Federal Government 901.9 Mio € 31.07.2012 Feasibility study of the BMVBS € 1.1 billion 20.06.2013 Debate in Parliament SH € 1.3 billion 16.07.2014 Report of the Federal Court € 1.5 billion

== Toll ==
The feasibility study by the BMVBS suggested a toll of 4.75 euros for cars and about 25 euros for large trucks. In addition to the toll for the use of the tunnel it has also been suggested that a toll be applied to the 70 kilometers of motorway which will be built linking the tunnel to the current autobahn network.

== Criticism ==
A fixed Elbe crossing is regarded by some as expensive and unnecessary. The Left party in the Schleswig-Holstein parliament rejects the proposed tunnel, stating that it would be far more cost effective to optimise the Glückstadt–Wischhafen ferry. Alliance 90/The Greens have in their draft manifesto for the 2012 Schleswig-Holstein state election opposed further construction of Bundesautobahn 20 west of Bundesautobahn 21, instead proposing strengthening the rail links. The Greens also claim the tunnel is a bad plan, because it will "drown" in rising sea levels.
