= Warnow-Ost =

Coordinates: 54.017°N 12.200°E

Warnow-Ost was an Amt in the former district of Bad Doberan, in Mecklenburg-Vorpommern, Germany. The seat of the Amt was in Dummerstorf. It was disbanded in June 2009.

The Amt Warnow-Ost consisted of the following municipalities:

1. Damm
2. Dummerstorf
3. Kavelstorf
4. Kessin
5. Lieblingshof
6. Prisannewitz
