= Bokel =

Bokel may refer to:

- Bokel, Lower Saxony, in the district of Cuxhaven, Lower Saxony
- Bokel, Pinneberg, in the district of Pinneberg, Schleswig-Holstein
- Bokel, Rendsburg-Eckernförde, in the district of Rendsburg-Eckernförde, Schleswig-Holstein
- Claudia Bokel (born 1973), German épée fencer
- Radost Bokel (born 1975), German actress
