= Groß Siemz =

- Ortsteil of Siemz-Niendorf
- Interactive map of Groß Siemz
- Location within Germany Location within Mecklenburg-Vorpommern
- Coordinates: 53°49′N 10°55′E
- Country: Germany
- State: Mecklenburg-Vorpommern
- District: Nordwestmecklenburg
- Municipality: Siemz-Niendorf

Area
  - Total: 14.82 km^{2} (5.72 sq mi)
- Elevation: 18 m (59 ft)

Population (2017-12-31)
  - Total: 308
  - Density: 20.8/km^{2} (53.8/sq mi)
- Time zone: UTC+01:00 (CET)
  - Summer (DST): UTC+02:00 (CEST)
- Postal codes: 23923
- Dialling codes: 038828
- Vehicle registration: NWM

Groß Siemz (German pronunciation: [ɡʁoːs ˈziːmts]) is a village and a former municipality in the Nordwestmecklenburg district, in Mecklenburg-Vorpommern, Germany. Since May 2019, it is part of the new municipality Siemz-Niendorf.
