= Bundesautobahn 293 =

Federal motorway in Germany

A 293
- Bundesautobahn 293
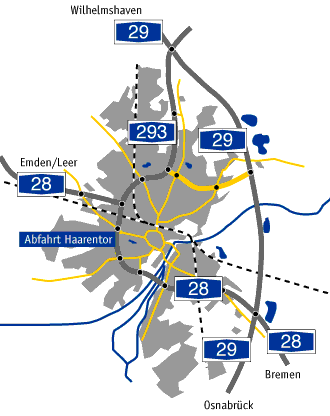

Route information
- Length: 7 km (4.3 mi)

Location
- Country: Germany
- States: Lower Saxony

Highway system
- Roads in Germany; Autobahns; List; Federal; List; State; E-roads

Bundesautobahn 293 (translates from German as Federal Motorway 293, short form Autobahn 293, abbreviated as BAB 293 or A 293) is an autobahn in Oldenburg in northwestern Germany. It connects the A 29 with the A 28.

== Exit list ==
	Coldewey (planned) B 211
	Mittelort (planned)
	Grossenmeer (planned)
	Loy (planned)
(7)	Oldenburg-Nord 4-way interchange A 29
(8)	Oldenburg-Etzhorn
(9)	Oldenburg-Nadorst (Nordtangente)
(10)	Oldenburg-Bürgerfelde
(11)	Oldenburg-West 3-way interchange A 28
