= List of subcamps of Bergen-Belsen =

Bergen-Belsen concentration camp had three satellite camps. These were at regional armament works. Around 2,000 female concentration camp prisoners were forced to work there. Those who were too weak or sick to continue with their work were brought to Bergen-Belsen. Prisoners were guarded by SS staff and received no wages for their work. The companies instead reimbursed the SS for the labour supplied. Wage taxes were also levied by local authorities.

== Außenlager Bomlitz-Benefeld ==
Außenlager Bomlitz-Benefeld at Bomlitz near Fallingbostel was in use from September 3 to October 15, 1944. It was located at the facility of Eibia GmbH, a gunpowder works. Around 600 female Polish Jews were used for construction and production work.

== Außenlager Hambühren-Ovelgönne ==
Außenlager Hambühren-Ovelgönne (Lager III, Waldeslust) at Hambühren south of Winsen was in use from August 23, 1944, to February 4, 1945. It was an abandoned potash mine, now intended as an underground production site for Bremen plane manufacturer Focke-Wulf. Around 400 prisoners, mostly female Polish or Hungarian Jews, were forced to prepare the facility and to help lay train tracks to it. This was done for the company Hochtief.

=== History ===
The Bergen-Belsen external command, “Waldeslust” camp, was one of a total of seven workers’ camps in Ovelgönne and three others in Hambühren, all of which were directly assigned to the ammunition factory. It was located a little north of the “Prinz Adalbert” shaft on today's Wiesenweg.

The camp existed from the beginning of the war and was initially used by Dutch workers and from 1942 onwards by Russian civilian workers. In August 1944, the external command of the Bergen-Belsen concentration camp was set up there, under the leadership of SS-Oberscharführer Karl Heinrich Reddehase, who was convicted and executed in 1946. With the first transport on August 23, 1944, 400 Jewish Polish women came to Ovelgönne via Belsen. They were part of a transport of 1,400 Polish women from Auschwitz. The remaining 1,000 women were taken to the Bergen-Belsen main camp or its Unterlüß subcamp.

The forced laborers had to load potash salt that had been blasted from tunnels into mine cars. The corridors were intended to enable an underground aircraft industry, specifically the product lines of the Bremer Flugzeugwerke Focke-Wulf (aircraft models Fw 190, Ta 152 and Ta 154) in order to protect them from air raids. All work by the camp inmates was carried out in night shifts so that other underground work was not hindered. In addition, the forced laborers were forced to build barracks, lay cables and pipes, and do heavy physical work in track construction for the Hochtief company.

On February 4, 1945, the camp was closed and the forced laborers were moved to the Bergen-Belsen main camp.

== Außenlager Unterlüß-Altensothrieth ==
Außenlager Unterlüß-Altensothrieth (Tannenberglager) east of Bergen was in use from late August 1944 to April 13, 1945. It was located about 4 km northwest of the village of Unterlüß, immediately south of the former Altensothrieth farm. It was located near to a large test site operated by Rheinmetall-Borsig AG. Up to 900 female Polish, Hungarian, Romanian, Yugoslavian and Czech Jews had to clear forest, do construction work or work in munitions production.

=== History ===
There were already several camps in Unterlüß that housed foreign workers, prisoners of war and other forced laborers of various nationalities who had to work in ammunition production at the Rheinmetall-Borsig AG company. Italian prisoners of war were housed in the camp in Altensothrieth until mid-1944. At the end of August 1944, after a transport of 400-800 Jewish women and girls from Auschwitz arrived in Unterlüß, the concentration camp subcamp for the Bergen-Belsen concentration camp, about 30 km away, was set up here. The females were mainly Polish, but there were also women of Hungarian, Yugoslavian, Czech and Romanian nationality. In October/November 1944 the number of prisoners in the camp was increased to 900. Aerial photographs from 1945 show that the camp consisted of at least five large barracks and several smaller buildings. The first camp commandant was SS- Hauptsturmführer Friedrich Diercks. On April 11 or 12, 1945, the camp guards fled from the advancing British troops. However, the forced laborers were not released, but were taken to the Bergen-Belsen concentration camp in trucks by members of the Volkssturm. There they were finally liberated by British troops on April 15, 1945.

=== Conditions ===
The forced laborers were used in road construction, removing rubble or laying rails. Their duties also included felling trees. Some of the women had to work in the Rheinmetall-Borsig AG ammunition factory. Due to a lack of protective measures, they were forced to inhale toxic chemicals. Many forced laborers suffered from poisoning and serious injuries from chemical burns.

The prisoners lived in isolation in isolated camps and were not allowed to have any contact with the civilian population. The food was inadequate even though the large local industry ensured strict compliance with nutritional regulations.
