= Bundesautobahn 28 =

Federal motorway in Germany

A 28
- Bundesautobahn 28
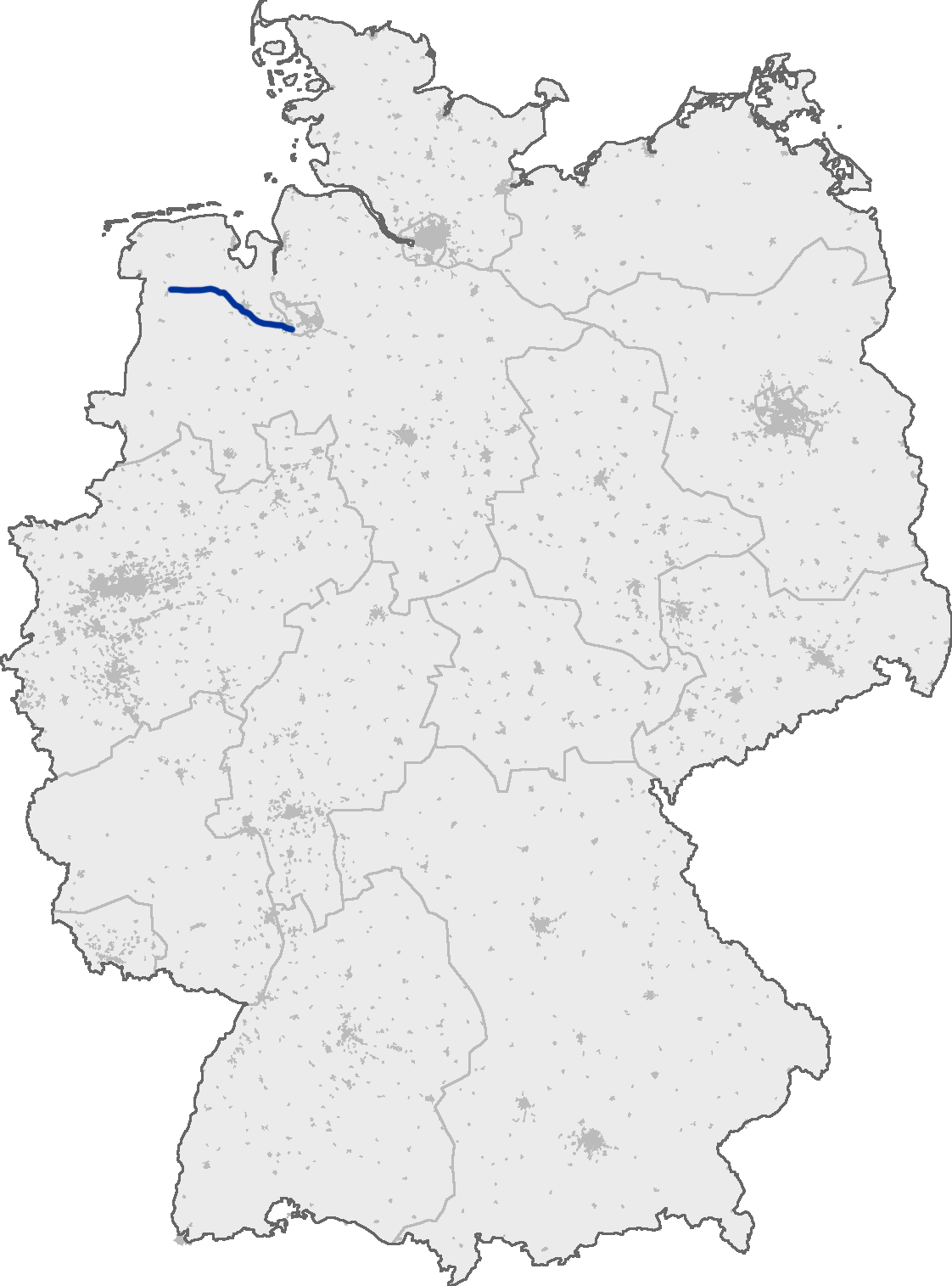

Route information
- Part of E22
- Length: 92 km (57 mi)

Major junctions
- From: Leer
- To: Delmenhorst

Location
- Country: Germany
- States: Lower Saxony

Highway system
- Roads in Germany; Autobahns; List; Federal; List; State; E-roads
← A 27	→ A 29

Bundesautobahn 28 (translates from German as Federal Motorway 28, short form Autobahn 28, abbreviated as BAB 28 or A 28) is an autobahn in northwestern Germany, connecting the cities of Leer and Oldenburg with via Bremen. Originally ending near the city of Delmenhorst, an extension connecting the A 28 to the A 1 has been finished in 2009.

== Exit list ==
	(1)	Leer 3-way interchange A 31
	(2)	Leer-Ost B 436
	(3)	Filsum B 72
	(4)	Apen/Remels
		Rest area Südgeorgsfehn
		Rest area Westerstede (planned)
	(5)	Westerstede-West
	(6)	Westerstede
	(7)	Bad Zwischenahn-West
		Helle/Linewege parking area
Intersection		3-way interchange Wiefelstede (planned) A 20
	(8)	Zwischenahner Meer
		Aue/Gristede parking area
	(9)	Neuenkruge
		Rest area
	(10)	Oldenburg-Wechloy
	(11)	Oldenburg-West 3-way interchange A 293
	(12)	Oldenburg-Haarentor
	(13)	Oldenburg-Eversten B 401
	(14)	Oldenburg-Marschweg
		Huntebrücke
	(15)	Oldenburg-Kreyenbrück
	(16)	Oldenburg-Osternburg
	(16)	Oldenburg-Ost 4-way interchange A 29
	(17)	Hatten
	(18)	Hude
		Services Hasbruch
	(19)	Ganderkesee-West B 212
	(20)	Ganderkesee-Ost
	(21)	Delmenhorst-Deichhorst B 213
	(22)	Delmenhorst-Adelheide
	(23)	Delmenhorst-Hasport
	(24)	Delmenhorst 3-way interchange B 75
		Pultern
		Services Tankstelle/Burger King
	(25)	Groß Mackenstedt B 322
	(26)	Stuhr 3-way interchange A 1
