= Bundesautobahn 29 =

Federal motorway in Germany

A 29
- Bundesautobahn 29
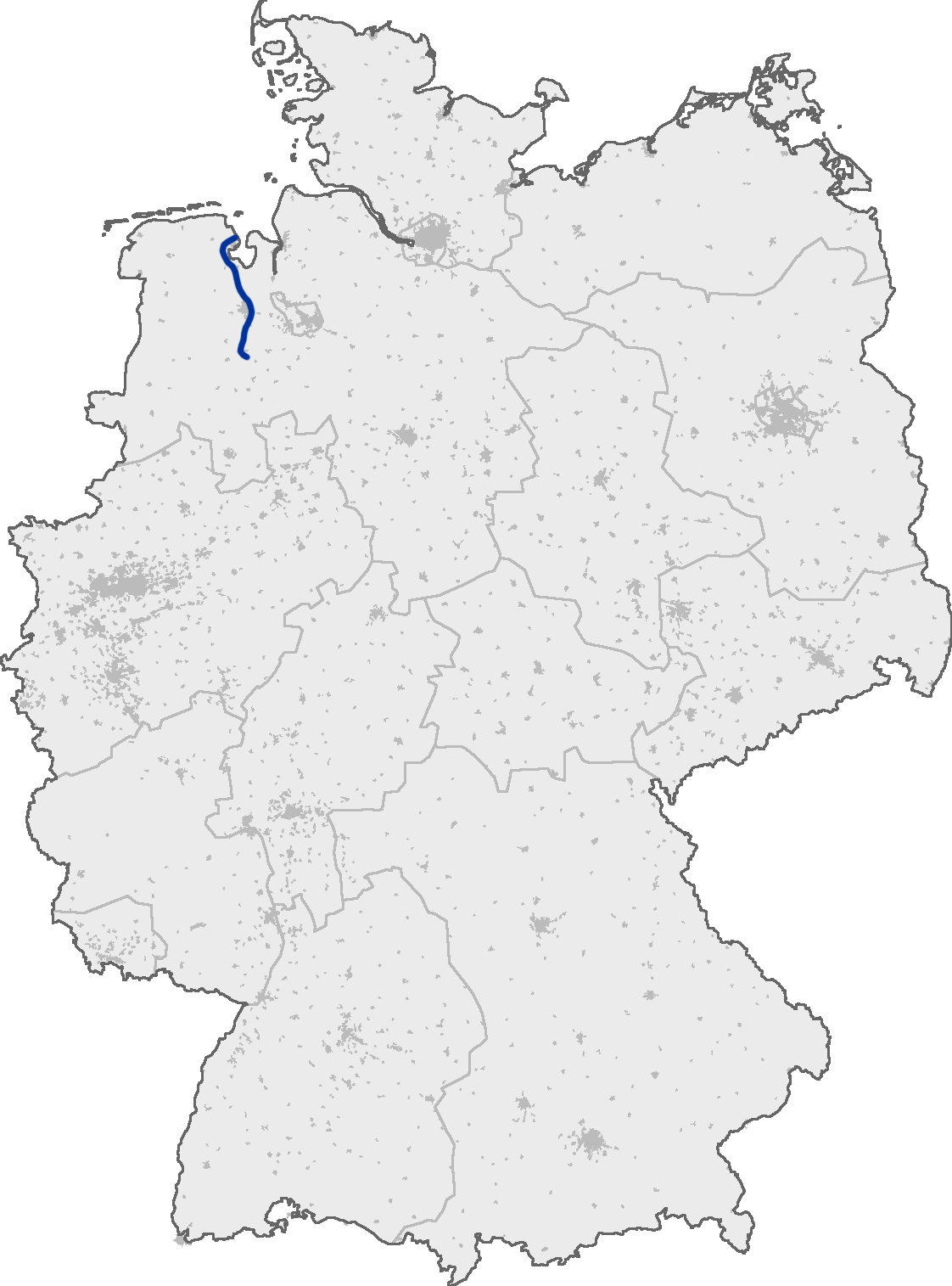

Route information
- Length: 93 km (58 mi)

Major junctions
- From: Wilhelmshaven
- To: Oldenburg

Location
- Country: Germany
- States: Lower Saxony

Highway system
- Roads in Germany; Autobahns; List; Federal; List; State; E-roads
← A 28	→ A 30

Bundesautobahn 29 (translates from German as Federal Motorway 29, short form Autobahn 29, abbreviated as BAB 29 or A 29) is an autobahn in northwestern Germany. It connects the city of Wilhelmshaven to Oldenburg and the A 1, running very roughly from north to south.

Traffic currently is light, but an increase in freight traffic is to be expected when the JadeWeserPort in Wilhelmshaven becomes operational.

== History ==
The A 29 largely replaces the former Reichsstraße and Bundesstraße 69, which in the area where it ran parallel to the A 29 has been downgraded to a state road and, north of Oldenburg, partly to a district road. Only the section of the B 69 between Schneiderkrug and Diepholz remained; in the north-west, it was diverted to the Cloppenburg junction of the A 1, from where traffic from Wilhelmshaven and Oldenburg is still routed towards Diepholz today.

The decision to build the freeway was made in May 1969 by the then Federal Minister of Transport Georg Leber, and construction lasted until April 1984. The construction costs totalled 680 million marks (today: around 1,544,476,000 euros) and was one of the most expensive in Germany in terms of cost per kilometer. This was also due to the fact that the A 29 ran almost exclusively on a newly built route. In particular, the comparatively short section of highway between Wilhelmshaven and Zetel proved to be extremely costly and time-consuming due to the poor subsoil in the former Black Brack area. Here in the muddy marshland, as much earth had to be moved and sand washed in as on the remaining 75 kilometers of the freeway to Ahlhorner Heide. The subsoil was excavated to a depth of 16 meters and replaced with sand.

On April 17, 1984, the last missing section of the freeway between Hengstlage and Ahlhorner Heide was opened by Dieter Schulte, Parliamentary State Secretary in the Ministry of Transport, Birgit Breuel, Lower Saxony's Minister of Economic Affairs, and Hans-Otto Seggelke, Oldenburg's Director of Construction. 129 new bridges were built along the original 91.7-kilometer-long freeway. Numerous quarry ponds were created next to the highway due to the necessary sand extraction for the sand filling along the route. Around 20,000 trees and shrubs were planted along the course of the highway.

In order not to interfere with shipping traffic, the Hunte in the east of Oldenburg is crossed by a ten-span high bridge over 441 meters long and 30 meters high, which was opened on 26 October 1978. As the load-bearing capacity of the bridge is no longer guaranteed in the long term, it was decided to build a replacement. The new bridge will also be 441 meters long and just under 30 meters high, but 31 meters wide and will be supported by 14 piers instead of 36. Construction work began at the end of 2023 and should be completed by the end of 2029.

Until October 2006, there was a makeshift airfield on the southern section of the A 29 between the Großenkneten (19) and Ahlhorn (20) junctions. The concrete central reservation was removed and landscaped. In the spring of 1984, a C-130 Hercules transport plane landed on the highway during the NATO exercise "Highway 84".

From 2009 to 2011, the A 29 in Wilhelmshaven was extended by 3.2 kilometers towards JadeWeserPort. The extension brought it to the new container port via three new bridges and a new junction. There, it ends in a traffic circle with exits to the new port terminal, the Niedersachsenbrücke bridge and the new Wilhelmshaven (Onyx) power plant. The costs for the extension amounted to 16.9 million euros. The construction costs also include the additional work at the Fedderwarden and Fedderwardergroden junctions in Wilhelmshaven. These were provided with on and off ramps that had previously been missing. The section was opened to traffic on December 6, 2011.

== Exit list ==
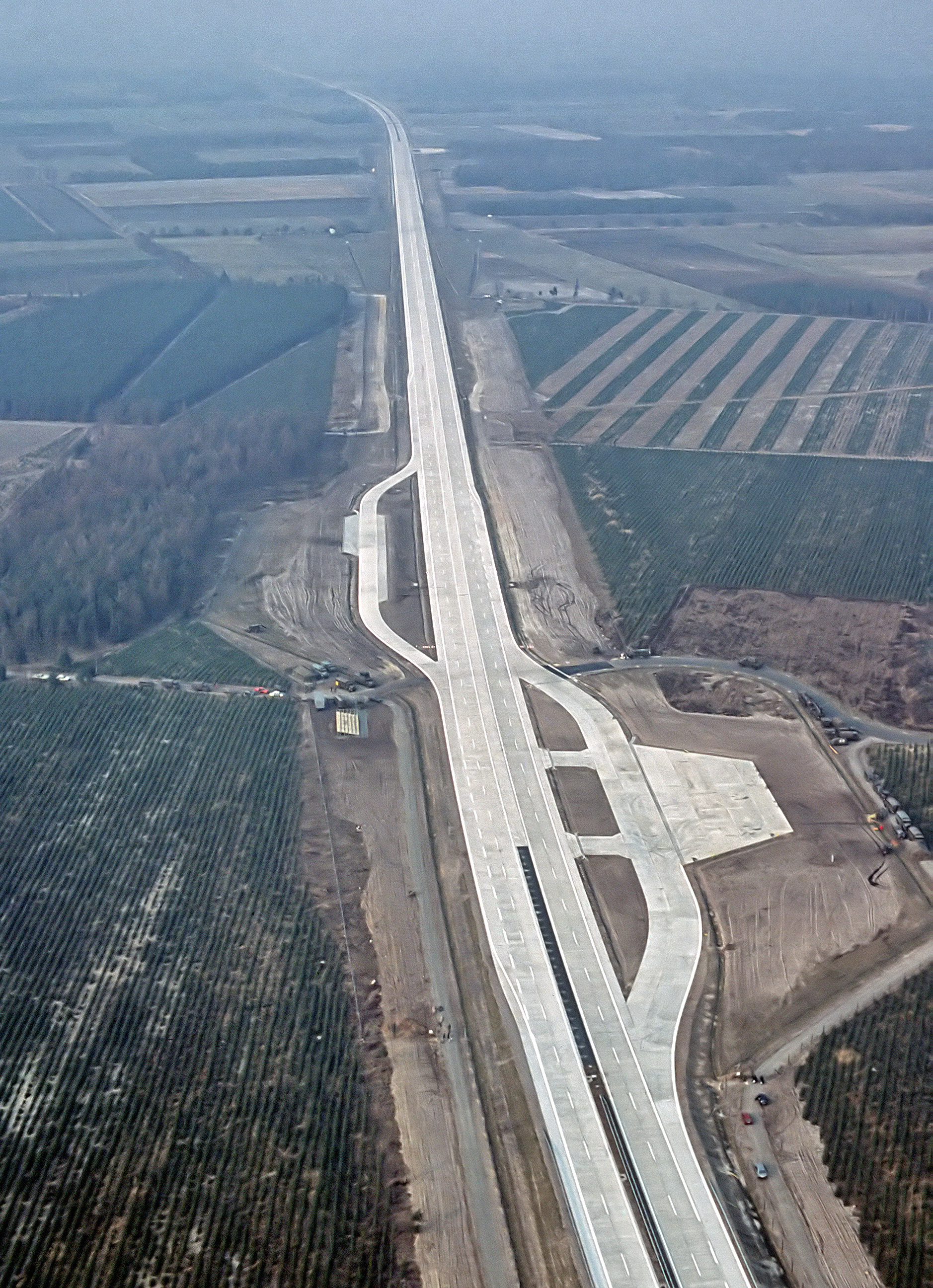
Near Ahlhorn, completed in 1984, sections of motorway were designed to be used as a military runway.

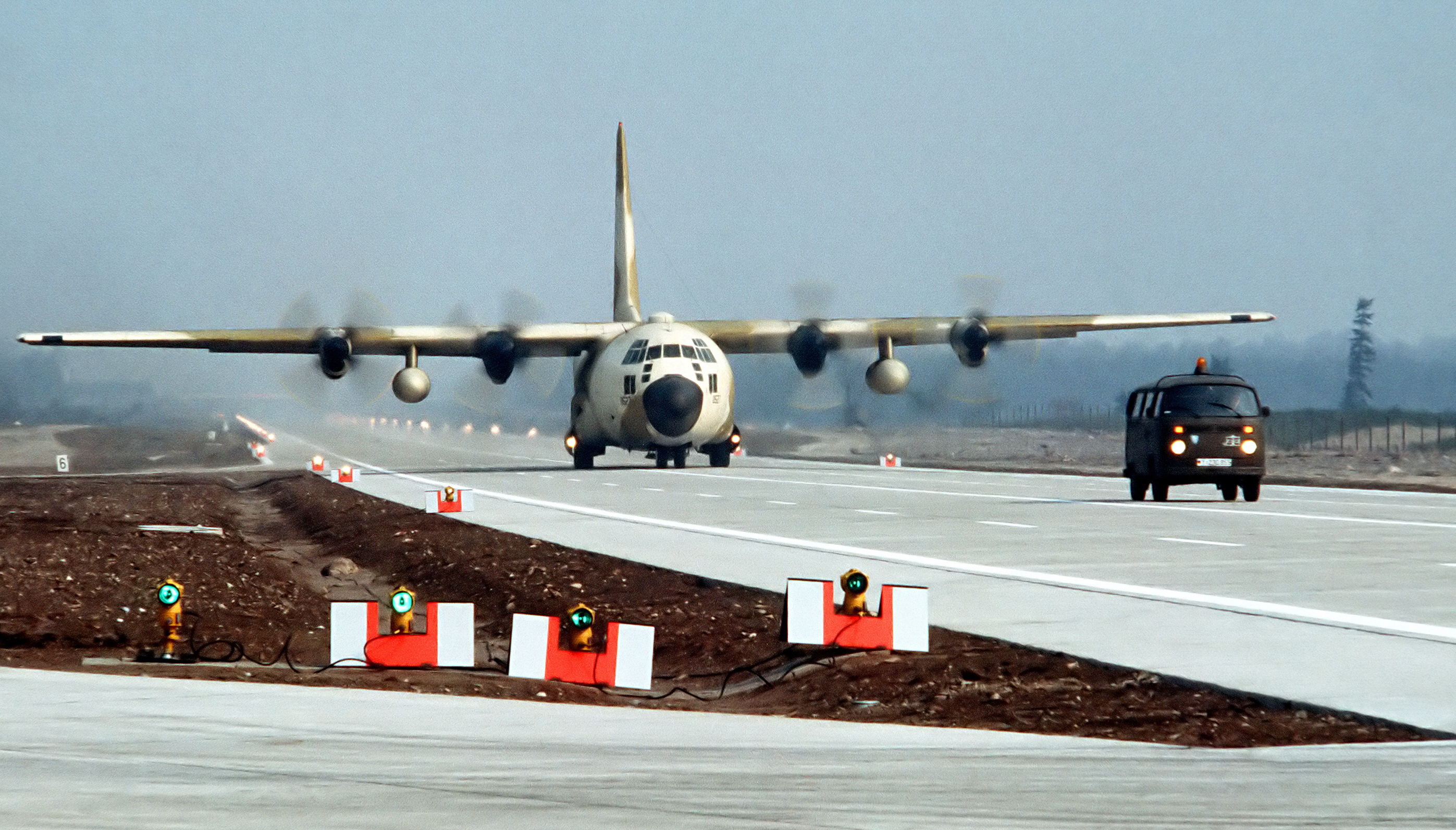
A C-130 Hercules transport plane during a NATO exercise, Highway 84.

(1)	Niedersachsendamm
(2)	Fedderwardergroden
(3)	Wilhelmshaven
(4)	Fedderwarden
(5)	Wilhelmshavener Kreuz B 210
	Ems-Jade-Kanal-Brücke
(6)	Sande B 436
(7)	Zetel
(8)	Varel / Bockhorn B 437
	parking area
(9)	Varel-Obenstrohe
(10)	Jaderberg
	Kreuz Jaderberg (planned) A 20
	Rest area
(11)	Hahn-Lehmden
(12)	Rastede
(13)	Oldenburg-Nord 4-way interchange A 293
(14)	Oldenburg-Ohmstede (Nordtangente)
	Huntebrücke
(15)	Oldenburg-Hafen
(16)	Oldenburg-Ost 4-way interchange A 28
(17)	Sandkrug
	Huntebrücke
	Services Huntetal-West
	Services Huntetal-Ost
(18)	Wardenburg
(19)	Großenkneten
(20)	Ahlhorn B 213
(21)	Ahlhorner Heide 3-way interchange A 1
