= Sanitz =

- Municipality
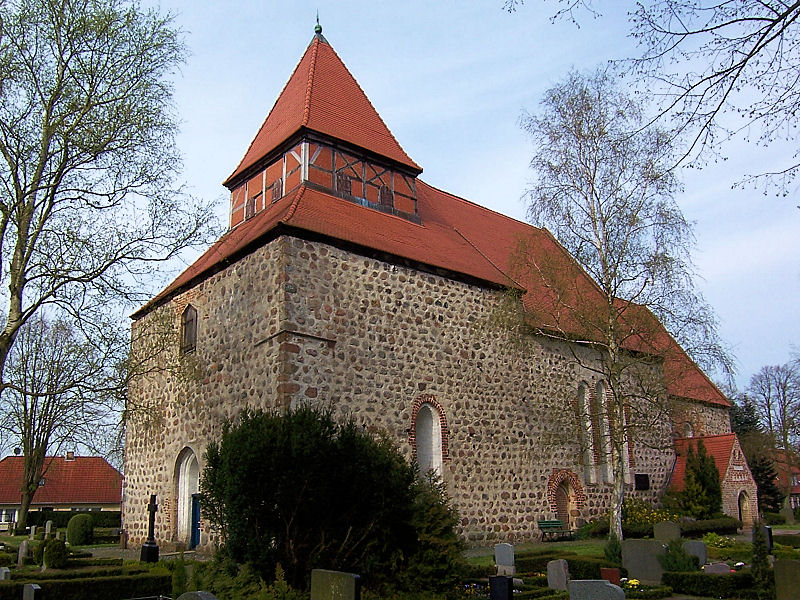
- The church in Sanitz

- Flag Coat of arms

- Location of Sanitz within Rostock district
- Interactive map of Sanitz
- Location within Germany Location within Mecklenburg-Vorpommern
- Coordinates: 54°05′N 12°23′E
- Country: Germany
- State: Mecklenburg-Vorpommern
- District: Rostock

Government
  - Mayor: Enrico Bendlin

Area
  - Total: 82.37 km^{2} (31.80 sq mi)
- Elevation: 45 m (148 ft)

Population (2025-12-31)
  - Total: 6,494
  - Density: 78.84/km^{2} (204.2/sq mi)
- Time zone: UTC+01:00 (CET)
  - Summer (DST): UTC+02:00 (CEST)
- Postal codes: 18190
- Dialling codes: 038209
- Vehicle registration: LRO
- Website: www.sanitz.de

Sanitz is a municipality in the Rostock district, in Mecklenburg-Vorpommern, Germany.

== Geography ==
Sanitz is located approximately 15 km (9 miles) east of Rostock.

It is subdivided into the following districts:

- Groß Freienholz
- Groß Lüsewitz (since 1 October 1997)
- Gubkow
- Hohen Gubkow
- Horst
- Klein Freienholz
- Klein Wehnendorf
- Niekrenz
- Oberhof
- Reppelin (since 1 October 1997)
- Teutendorf (since 10 October 1965)
- Vietow
- Wendfeld
- Wendorf (till 22 July 1961)

== History ==
Sanitz is mentioned in the sources in 1256 when it was called Kirchdorf. The mention involved the church at Dänschenburg which was described as a daughter church of Sanitz. A subsequent mention occurs in an agreement of 2 June 1291 involving Henry I of Mecklenburg-Güstrow, at the time the local Bishop, who granted the lordship of the Rostock region to his ward Nicholas whose own heirs would retain these privileges. In the fourteenth century Sanitz is recorded as having been held by asuccession of vassals such as Bernard Kopmann from Rostock, the knight Siegfried of Plön, Reimar von Wedel, the Rostock council member Dietrich Horn, along with his son, the major Dippold Horn. After this the village was inherited by the Cistercian monastery at Doberan who held it until the Reformation. In 1552 the monastery fell victim to a programme of Secularization in the area and the village was transferred as a ducal domain to Robnitz and thereafter leased out to various land owning families. In 1879 the village passed into the control of nearby Toitenwinkel.

== Famous sons and daughters ==
- Friedrich von Flotow (1812 - 1883), the composer, was born in Teutendorf, which subsequently became a district of Sanitz.
- Helga Radtke (b 1962), the athlete, was born at Sanitz
