= Lieblingshof =

Village in Mecklenburg-Vorpommern, Germany

- Ortsteil of Dummerstorf
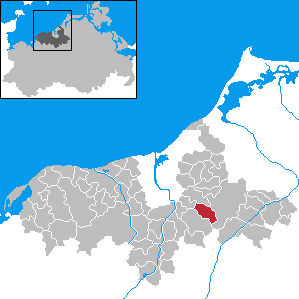
- Location of Lieblingshof within the former district of Bad Doberan
- Interactive map of Lieblingshof
- Location within Germany Location within Mecklenburg-Vorpommern
- Coordinates: 54°1′N 12°19′E
- Country: Germany
- State: Mecklenburg-Vorpommern
- District: Rostock
- Municipality: Dummerstorf

Area
  - Total: 17.71 km^{2} (6.84 sq mi)
- Elevation: 40 m (130 ft)

Population (2006-12-31)
  - Total: 709
  - Density: 40.0/km^{2} (104/sq mi)
- Time zone: UTC+01:00 (CET)
  - Summer (DST): UTC+02:00 (CEST)
- Postal codes: 18196
- Dialling codes: 038204, 038209
- Vehicle registration: DBR
- Website: Amt Warnow-Ost

Lieblingshof is a village and a former municipality in the district of Rostock, in Mecklenburg-Vorpommern, Germany. Since 7 June 2009, it is part of the municipality Dummerstorf. Prior to this, it was within the Warnow-Ost Amt.
