= Prisannewitz =

- Ortsteil of Dummerstorf
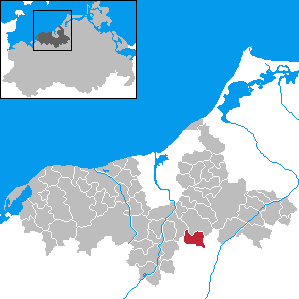
- Location of Prisannewitz within the former district of Bad Doberan
- Interactive map of Prisannewitz
- Location within Germany Location within Mecklenburg-Vorpommern
- Coordinates: 53°58′N 12°13′E
- Country: Germany
- State: Mecklenburg-Vorpommern
- District: Rostock
- Municipality: Dummerstorf

Area
  - Total: 19.20 km^{2} (7.41 sq mi)
- Elevation: 32 m (105 ft)

Population (2006-12-31)
  - Total: 619
  - Density: 32.2/km^{2} (83.5/sq mi)
- Time zone: UTC+01:00 (CET)
  - Summer (DST): UTC+02:00 (CEST)
- Postal codes: 18196
- Dialling codes: 038208
- Vehicle registration: DBR
- Website: Amt Warnow-Ost

Prisannewitz is part of the municipality of Dummerstorf in Mecklenburg-Vorpommern, Germany. Prior to its incorporation into Dummerstorf, it was a municipality in the district of Rostock. Before this, it was in the Warnow-Ost Amt.

The following areas are part of Prisannewtiz:

- Groß Potrems
- Scharstorf
- Wendorf
- Klein Potrems
