= Kavelstorf =

- Ortsteil of Dummerstorf
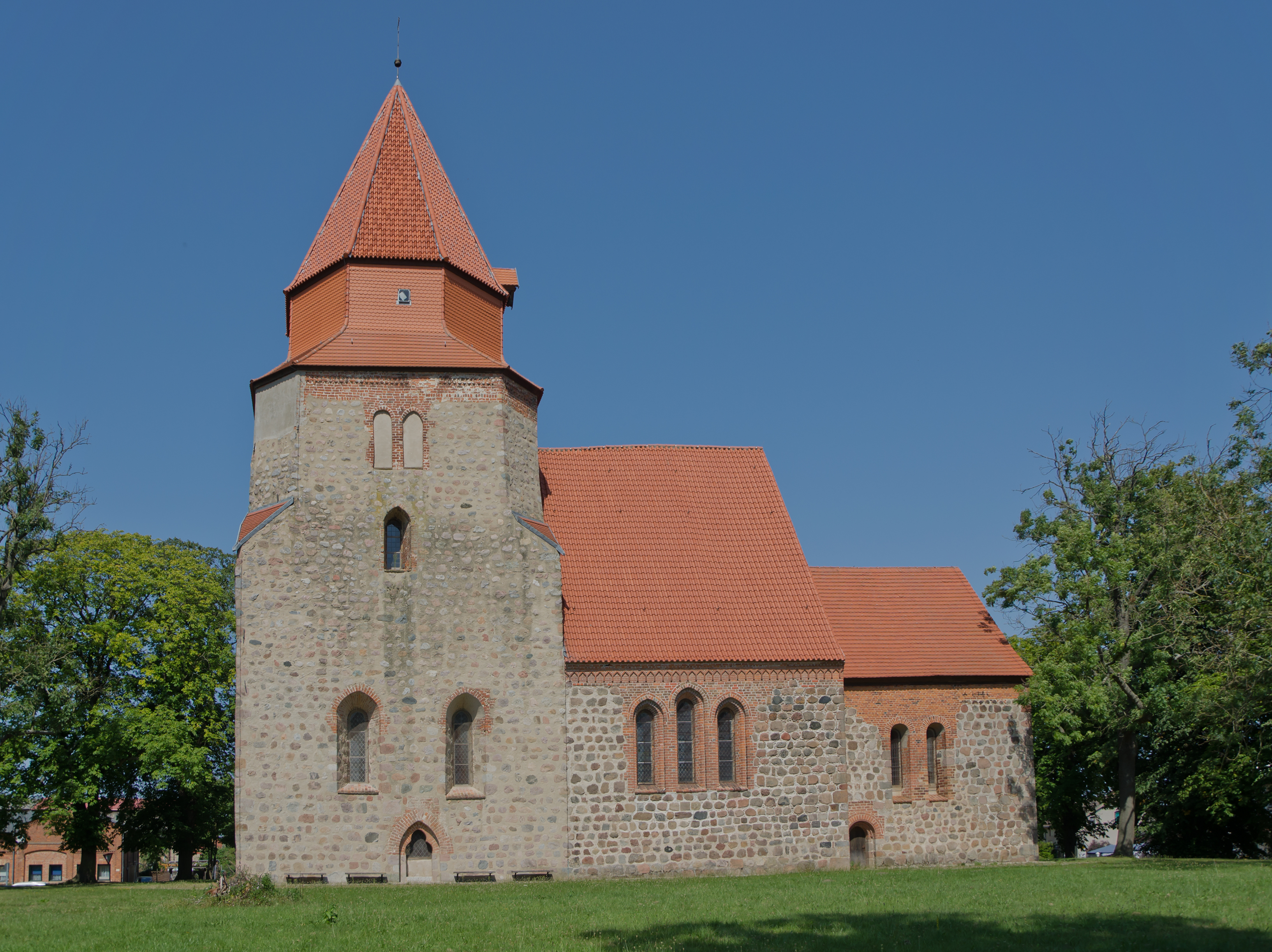
- Medieval village church in Kavelstorf

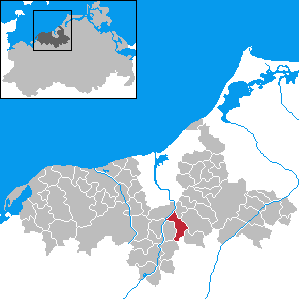
- Location of Kavelstorf within the former district of Bad Doberan
- Interactive map of Kavelstorf
- Location within Germany Location within Mecklenburg-Vorpommern
- Coordinates: 54°0′N 12°11′E
- Country: Germany
- State: Mecklenburg-Vorpommern
- District: Rostock
- Municipality: Dummerstorf

Area
  - Total: 20.41 km^{2} (7.88 sq mi)
- Elevation: 31 m (102 ft)

Population (2006-12-31)
  - Total: 1,217
  - Density: 59.63/km^{2} (154.4/sq mi)
- Time zone: UTC+01:00 (CET)
  - Summer (DST): UTC+02:00 (CEST)
- Postal codes: 18196
- Dialling codes: 038208
- Vehicle registration: DBR

Kavelstorf is a village and a former municipality in the district of Rostock, in Mecklenburg-Vorpommern, Germany. Since 7 June 2009, it has been part of the Dummerstorf municipality. Before this, it was part of the Warnow-Ost Amt.

== Geography ==
Kavelstorf is situated ten kilometers southeast of Rostock, between the lower Warnow river and its tributaries, the Kösterbeck and the Zarnow. Parts of the valleys of these three waterways are designated as nature reserves.

== History ==
On 1 July 1950, the previously independent municipality of Griebnitz was incorporated. From 1987 to 1989, a secret depot was located in Kavelstorf, where Internationale Messtechnik Import-Export GmbH (IMES), a subsidiary of the Commercial Coordination sector, stored weapons of war intended for export.
