= Oldendorf, Stade =

Oldendorf
- Municipality
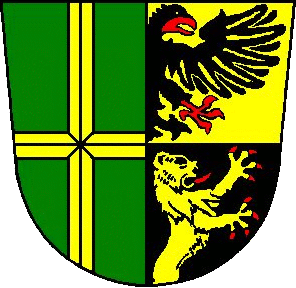
- Coat of arms

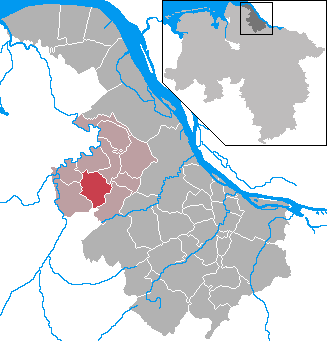
- Location of Oldendorf within Stade district
- Interactive map of Oldendorf
- Location within Germany Location within Lower Saxony
- Coordinates: 53°35′31″N 9°14′59″E
- Country: Germany
- State: Lower Saxony
- District: Stade
- Municipal assoc.: Oldendorf-Himmelpforten

Government
  - Mayor: Holger Falcke (CDU)

Area
  - Total: 23.96 km^{2} (9.25 sq mi)
- Elevation: 12 m (39 ft)

Population (2025-12-31)
  - Total: 3,103
  - Density: 129.5/km^{2} (335.4/sq mi)
- Time zone: UTC+01:00 (CET)
  - Summer (DST): UTC+02:00 (CEST)
- Postal codes: 21726
- Dialling codes: 04144
- Vehicle registration: STD
- Website: samtgemeinde-oldendorf.de

Oldendorf (German pronunciation: [ˈɔldn̩dɔʁf]; Low German: Olendörp) is a municipality in the district of Stade, in Lower Saxony, Germany. It is situated west of Hamburg. Oldendorf has a population of approx. 3,000. Oldendorf was the seat of the former Samtgemeinde ("collective municipality") Oldendorf.

== History ==
Oldendorf belonged to the Prince-Archbishopric of Bremen, established in 1180. In 1648 the Prince-Archbishopric was transformed into the Duchy of Bremen, which was first ruled in personal union by the Swedish Crown - interrupted by a Danish occupation (1712–1715) - and from 1715 on by the Hanoverian Crown. In 1807 the ephemeric Kingdom of Westphalia annexed the Duchy, before France annexed it in 1810. In 1813 the duchy was restored to the Electorate of Hanover, which - after its upgrade to the Kingdom of Hanover in 1814 - incorporated the duchy in a real union and the ducal territory, including Oldendorf, became part of the new Stade Region, established in 1823.
