= Wiefelstede =

- Municipality
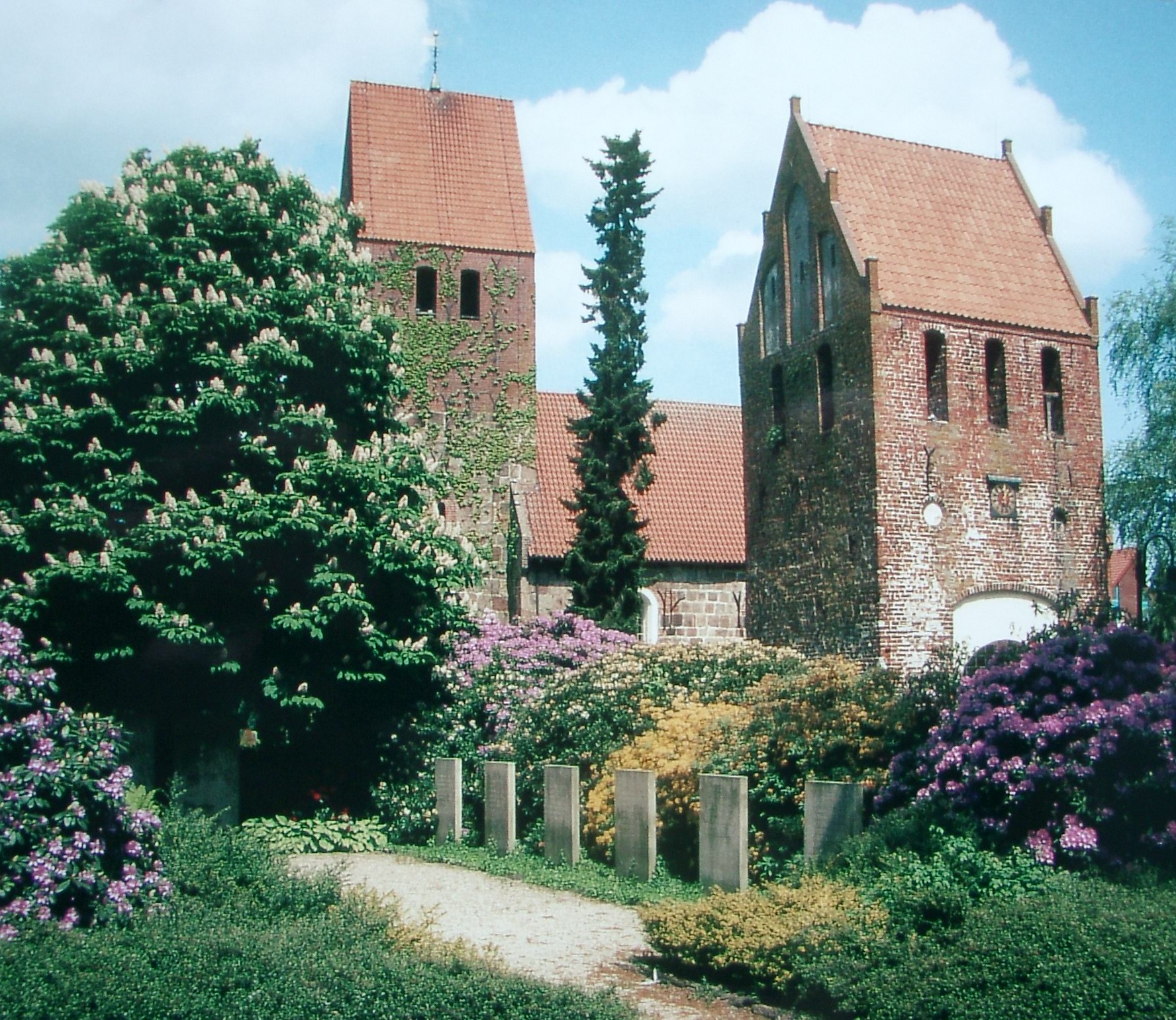
- Church of Saint John the Baptist

- Flag Coat of arms

- Location of Wiefelstede within Ammerland district
- Interactive map of Wiefelstede
- Location within Germany Location within Lower Saxony
- Coordinates: 53°15′29″N 8°7′2″E
- Country: Germany
- State: Lower Saxony
- District: Ammerland
- Subdivisions: 20 districts

Government
  - Mayor (2021–26): Jörg Pieper (Ind.)

Area
  - Total: 106.51 km^{2} (41.12 sq mi)
- Elevation: 16 m (52 ft)

Population (2025-12-31)
  - Total: 16,538
  - Density: 155.27/km^{2} (402.15/sq mi)
- Time zone: UTC+01:00 (CET)
  - Summer (DST): UTC+02:00 (CEST)
- Postal codes: 26215
- Dialling codes: 04402
- Vehicle registration: WST
- Website: www.wiefelstede.de

Wiefelstede (German pronunciation: [viːfl̩ˈʃteːdə]; Low German: Wiefelstä) is a municipality in the Ammerland district, in Lower Saxony, Germany. It is situated approximately 15 km northwest of Oldenburg.

It is home to Brötje Automation GmbH, an automated aircraft assembly manufacturer.

The St. Johannes Evangelical Lutheran church located in Wiefelstede is the oldest stone church in the Ammerland Region. The church opened in 1057.

== Sons and daughters ==
- Rudolf Bultmann (1884-1976), German Lutheran theologian and professor of the New Testament at the University of Marburg
