= Bobitz =

- Municipality
- Location of Bobitz within Nordwestmecklenburg district
- Interactive map of Bobitz
- Location within Germany Location within Mecklenburg-Vorpommern
- Coordinates: 53°47′N 11°20′E
- Country: Germany
- State: Mecklenburg-Vorpommern
- District: Nordwestmecklenburg
- Municipal assoc.: Dorf Mecklenburg-Bad Kleinen

Government
  - Mayor: Annemarie Homann-Trieps

Area
  - Total: 65.48 km^{2} (25.28 sq mi)
- Elevation: 69 m (226 ft)

Population (2025-12-31)
  - Total: 2,499
  - Density: 38.16/km^{2} (98.85/sq mi)
- Time zone: UTC+01:00 (CET)
  - Summer (DST): UTC+02:00 (CEST)
- Postal codes: 23996
- Dialling codes: 038424
- Vehicle registration: NWM

Bobitz is a municipality in the Nordwestmecklenburg district, in Mecklenburg-Vorpommern, Germany.

== People ==
- Friedrich Graf von der Schulenburg (1865–1939), Prussian general
