= Groß Sarau =

- Municipality
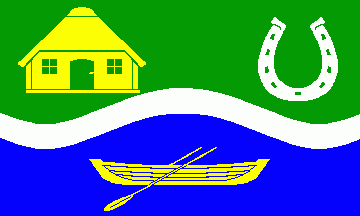
- Flag Coat of arms

- Location of Groß Sarau within Herzogtum Lauenburg district
- Interactive map of Groß Sarau
- Location within Germany Location within Schleswig-Holstein
- Coordinates: 53°46′N 10°44′E
- Country: Germany
- State: Schleswig-Holstein
- District: Herzogtum Lauenburg
- Municipal assoc.: Lauenburgische Seen

Government
  - Mayor: Volker Niederhausen

Area
  - Total: 17.08 km^{2} (6.59 sq mi)
- Elevation: 16 m (52 ft)

Population (2025-12-31)
  - Total: 1,127
  - Density: 65.98/km^{2} (170.9/sq mi)
- Time zone: UTC+01:00 (CET)
  - Summer (DST): UTC+02:00 (CEST)
- Postal codes: 23627
- Dialling codes: 04509, 04541
- Vehicle registration: RZ
- Website: www.amt-lauenburgische-seen.de

Groß Sarau is a municipality in the district of Lauenburg, in Schleswig-Holstein, Germany.
