= European route E251 =

Road in trans-European E-road network

E251

Major junctions
- From: Sassnitz (Germany)
- To: Berlin (Germany)

Location
- Countries: Germany

Highway system
- International E-road network; A Class; B Class

E251 is a European B class road in Germany, connecting the cities Sassnitz – Stralsund – Neubrandenburg – Berlin

- Germany
  - Sassnitz, Stralsund, Neubrandenburg, Berlin
