= Kessin =

- Ortsteil of Dummerstorf
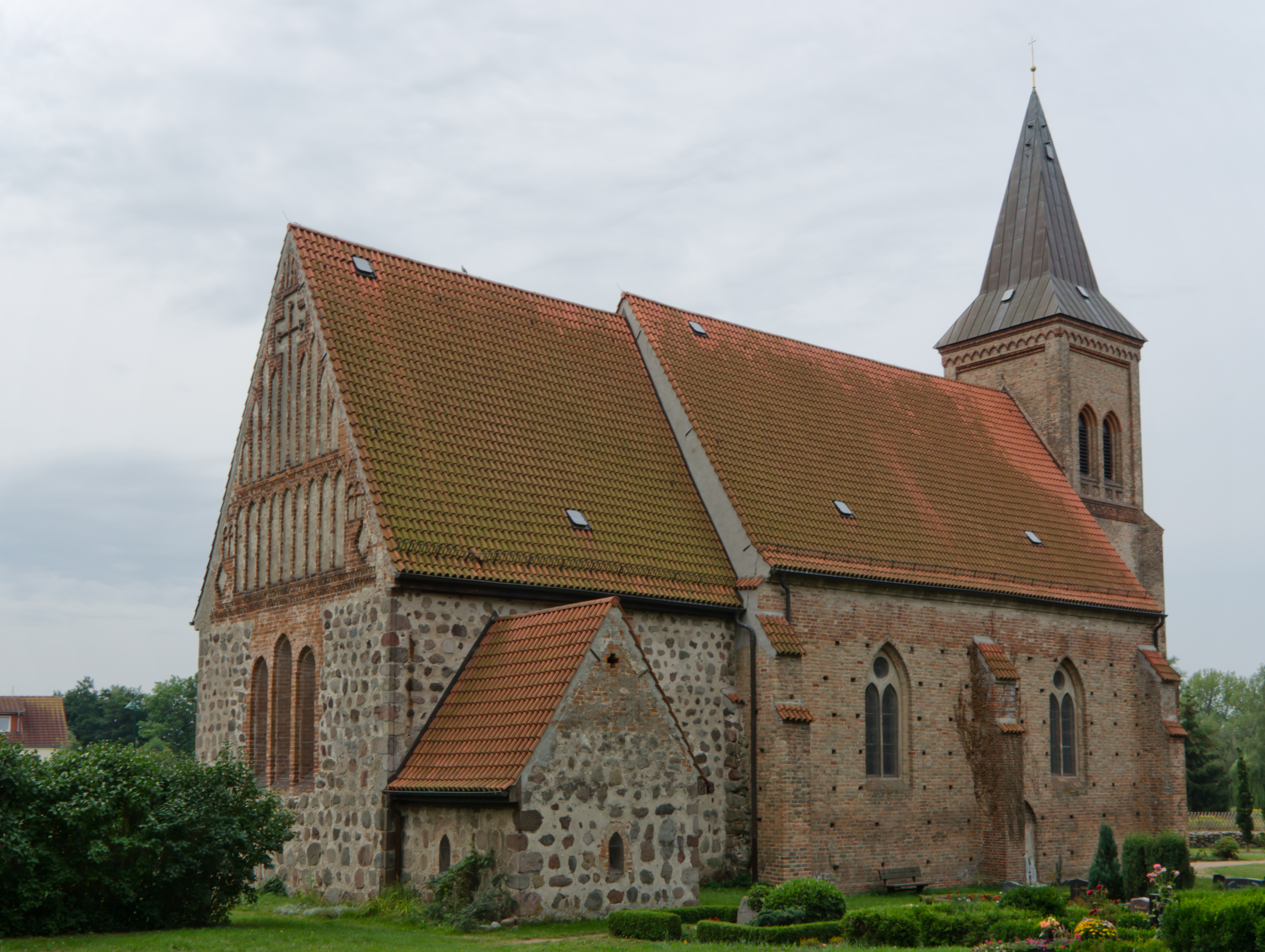
- Medieval village church in Kessin

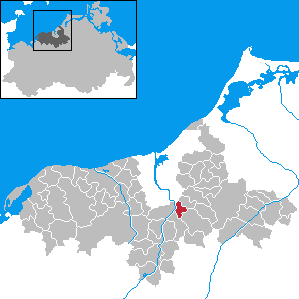
- Location of Kessin within the former district of Bad Doberan
- Interactive map of Kessin
- Location within Germany Location within Mecklenburg-Vorpommern
- Coordinates: 54°4′N 12°11′E
- Country: Germany
- State: Mecklenburg-Vorpommern
- District: Rostock
- Municipality: Dummerstorf

Area
  - Total: 10.97 km^{2} (4.24 sq mi)
- Elevation: 27 m (89 ft)

Population (2009-12-31)
  - Total: 1,478
  - Density: 134.7/km^{2} (349.0/sq mi)
- Time zone: UTC+01:00 (CET)
  - Summer (DST): UTC+02:00 (CEST)
- Postal codes: 18196
- Dialling codes: 0381, 038208
- Vehicle registration: DBR

Kessin is a village and a former municipality in the district of Rostock, in Mecklenburg-Vorpommern, Germany.

== History ==
Since 7 June 2009, it is part of the municipality Dummerstorf. Before this, it was within the Warnow-Ost Amt.

A group of West Slavic people affiliated with the Veleti tribe settled Kessini in the 8th century. Known as the Kessinians, linguistically, they belonged to the Polabian Slavs.

== In popular culture ==
A large part of the plot of Theodor Fontane's realist novel Effi Briest takes place in a fictional town named Kessin, which is said to be in Farther Pomerania.
