= Dummerstorf =

- Municipality
- Location of Dummerstorf within Rostock district
- Interactive map of Dummerstorf
- Location within Germany Location within Mecklenburg-Vorpommern
- Coordinates: 54°1′N 12°13′E
- Country: Germany
- State: Mecklenburg-Vorpommern
- District: Rostock

Government
  - Mayor: Axel Wiechmann

Area
  - Total: 119.89 km^{2} (46.29 sq mi)
- Elevation: 43 m (141 ft)

Population (2025-12-31)
  - Total: 7,602
  - Density: 63.41/km^{2} (164.2/sq mi)
- Time zone: UTC+01:00 (CET)
  - Summer (DST): UTC+02:00 (CEST)
- Postal codes: 18196
- Dialling codes: 038204, 038208
- Vehicle registration: LRO
- Website: www.dummerstorf.de

Dummerstorf is a municipality in the Rostock district, in Mecklenburg-Vorpommern, Germany.

== Geography ==
The municipality Dummerstorf is located approximately 10 km in the southeast of Rostock.

=== Districts ===
The municipality is composed since 7 June 2009 of the former municipalities of the dissolved Amt Warnow-Ost.

Districts are:

- Dummerstorf with Bandelstorf, Dishley, Göldenitz, Pankelow, Schlage and Waldeck
- Damm with Groß Viegeln, Klein Viegeln and Reez
- Kavelstorf with Griebnitz, Klingendorf and Niex
- Kessin with Beselin and Hohen Schwarfs
- Lieblingshof with Godow, Petschow and Wolfsberg
- Prisannewitz with Prisannewitz-Ausbau, Groß Potrems, Klein Potrems, Scharstorf and Wendorf

== Politics ==
Since the local elections on 25 May 2014 the seats of the municipal council are distributed as follows:

Party / List	Seats
CDU	9
SPD	3
Die Linke	2
Wählergemeinschaft „Miteinander leben“	2
Voters association PPSW	2
Single candidates	1

== Personalities ==
- Carl Schlettwein (* 1830 in Bandelstorf; † 1897 in Wiesbaden), landowner of Bandelstorf and administrative lawyer.
