= Werder, Demmin =

Werder
- Municipality
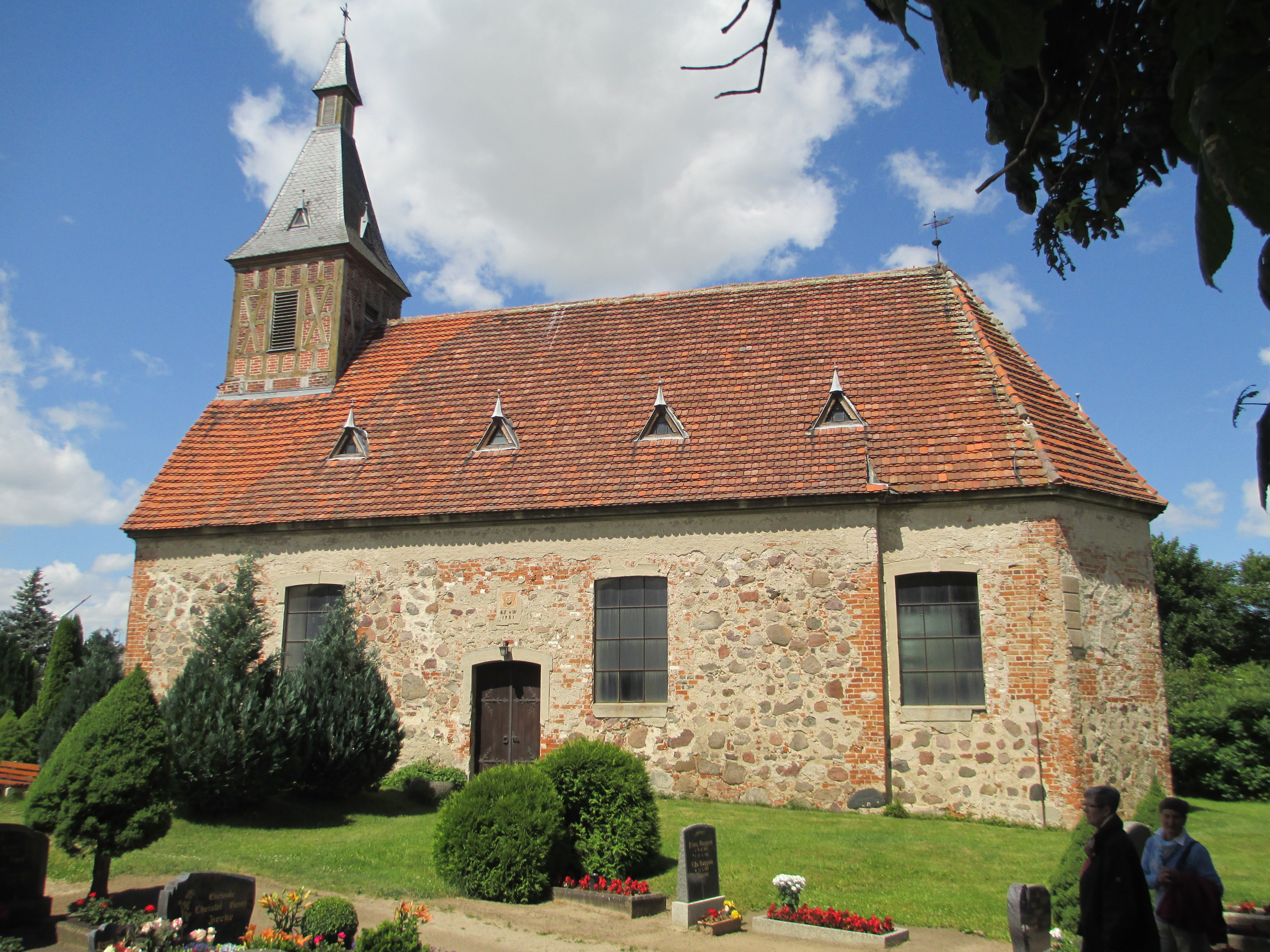
- Medieval church in Werder

- Location of Werder within Mecklenburgische Seenplatte district
- Interactive map of Werder
- Location within Germany Location within Mecklenburg-Vorpommern
- Coordinates: 53°43′N 13°22′E
- Country: Germany
- State: Mecklenburg-Vorpommern
- District: Mecklenburgische Seenplatte
- Municipal assoc.: Treptower Tollensewinkel
- Subdivisions: 3

Government
  - Mayor: Michael Frese

Area
  - Total: 30.21 km^{2} (11.66 sq mi)
- Elevation: 22 m (72 ft)

Population (2025-12-31)
  - Total: 516
  - Density: 17.1/km^{2} (44.2/sq mi)
- Time zone: UTC+01:00 (CET)
  - Summer (DST): UTC+02:00 (CEST)
- Postal codes: 17089
- Dialling codes: 03969
- Vehicle registration: DM
- Website: www.altentreptow.de

Werder (German pronunciation: [ˈvɛʁdɐ]) is a municipality in the Mecklenburgische Seenplatte district, in Mecklenburg-Vorpommern, Germany.
