= Glienke =

- Ortsteil of Friedland
- Interactive map of Glienke
- Location within Germany Location within Mecklenburg-Vorpommern
- Coordinates: 53°35′N 13°25′E
- Country: Germany
- State: Mecklenburg-Vorpommern
- District: Mecklenburgische Seenplatte
- Town: Friedland

Area
  - Total: 6.67 km^{2} (2.58 sq mi)
- Elevation: 33 m (108 ft)

Population (2012-12-31)
  - Total: 158
  - Density: 23.7/km^{2} (61.4/sq mi)
- Time zone: UTC+01:00 (CET)
  - Summer (DST): UTC+02:00 (CEST)
- Postal codes: 17099
- Dialling codes: 039606
- Vehicle registration: MST
- Website: www.friedland-mecklenburg.de

Glienke (German pronunciation: [ˈɡliːŋkə]) is a village and a former municipality in the Mecklenburgische Seenplatte district, in Mecklenburg-Vorpommern, Germany. Since 25 May 2014, it is part of the town Friedland.
