= Weser Tunnel =

Road tunnel in northwestern Germany

Coordinates: 53°26′07″N 8°29′39″E

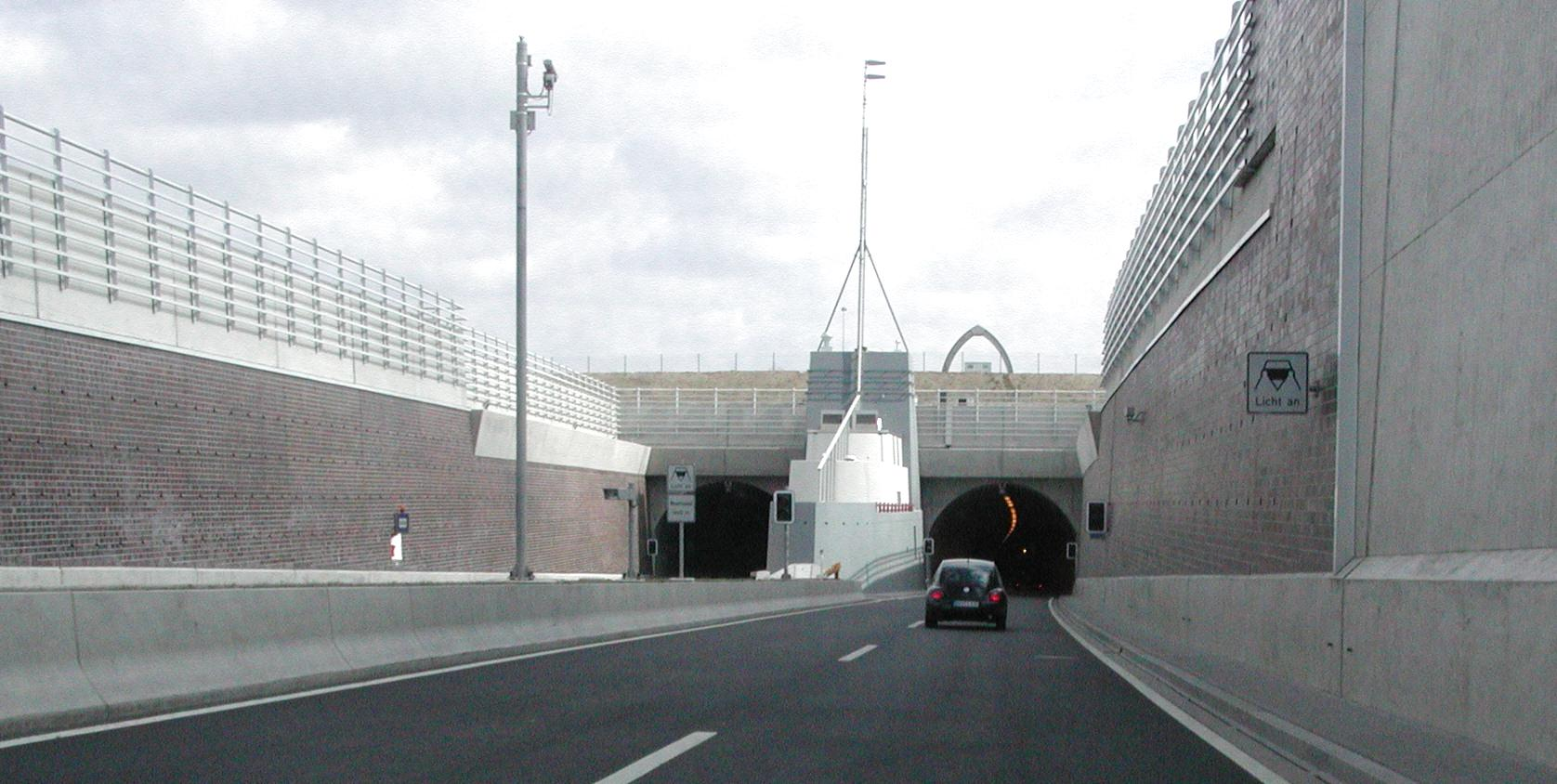
Tunnel entrance

The Wesertunnel crosses the river Weser in northwestern Germany between the villages of Rodenkirchen and Dedesdorf, offering a connection between the cities of Nordenham and Bremerhaven on a regional level.

It was built from 1998 to 2004 and connects the districts of Wesermarsch and Cuxhaven by means of the B 437, providing easy access to the A 27 motorway and the B 212.

In the long run it will be part of the planned A 22, 2010 renamed A 20 as prospective part of the Ostsee- or Küstenautobahn (Baltic or Coastal Freeway).
