= Niendorf, Mecklenburg-Vorpommern =

Niendorf
- Ortsteil of Siemz-Niendorf
- Interactive map of Niendorf
- Location within Germany Location within Mecklenburg-Vorpommern
- Coordinates: 53°49′N 10°54′E
- Country: Germany
- State: Mecklenburg-Vorpommern
- District: Nordwestmecklenburg
- Municipality: Siemz-Niendorf

Area
  - Total: 11.54 km^{2} (4.46 sq mi)
- Elevation: 14 m (46 ft)

Population (2017-12-31)
  - Total: 314
  - Density: 27.2/km^{2} (70.5/sq mi)
- Time zone: UTC+01:00 (CET)
  - Summer (DST): UTC+02:00 (CEST)
- Postal codes: 23923
- Dialling codes: 038828
- Vehicle registration: NWM

Niendorf (German pronunciation: [ˈniːndɔʁf]) is a village and a former municipality in the Nordwestmecklenburg district, in Mecklenburg-Vorpommern, Germany. Since May 2019, it is part of the new municipality Siemz-Niendorf.

It is close to the cities of Lübeck, Wismar and Schwerin and is part of the Hamburg Metropolitan Region.
