= Damm (Dummerstorf) =

- Ortsteil of Dummerstorf
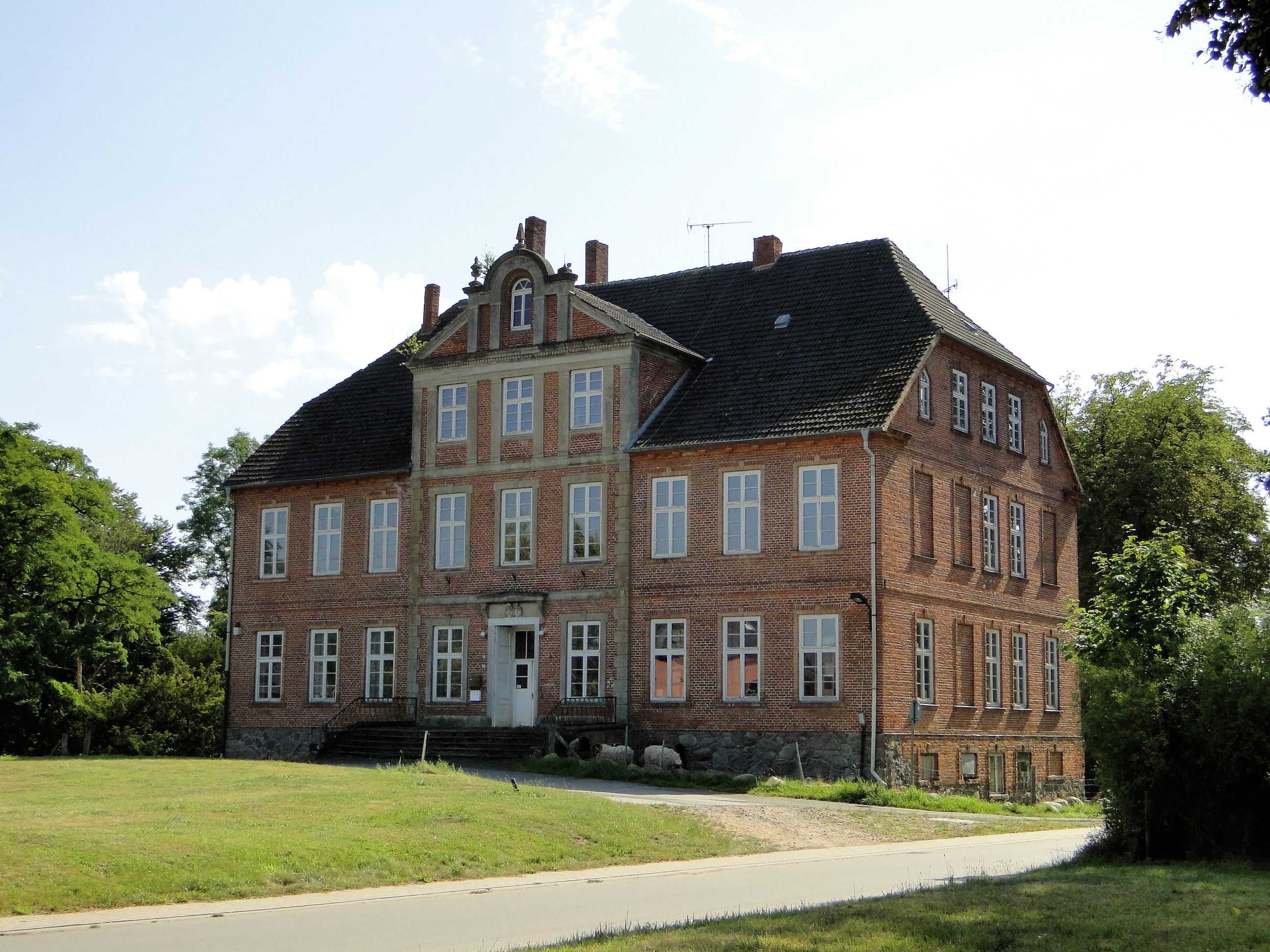
- Reez manor in Damm

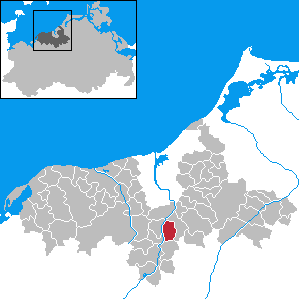
- Location of Damm within the former district of Bad Doberan
- Interactive map of Damm
- Location within Germany Location within Mecklenburg-Vorpommern
- Coordinates: 54°1′N 12°8′E
- Country: Germany
- State: Mecklenburg-Vorpommern
- District: Rostock
- Municipality: Dummerstorf

Area
  - Total: 16.52 km^{2} (6.38 sq mi)
- Elevation: 24 m (79 ft)

Population (2006-12-31)
  - Total: 672
  - Density: 40.7/km^{2} (105/sq mi)
- Time zone: UTC+01:00 (CET)
  - Summer (DST): UTC+02:00 (CEST)
- Postal codes: 18196
- Dialling codes: 038208
- Vehicle registration: DBR

Damm is a village and a former municipality in the district of Rostock, in Mecklenburg-Vorpommern, Germany. Since 7 June 2009, it is part of the municipality Dummerstorf.
