= Siemz-Niendorf =

- Municipality
- Location of Siemz-Niendorf within Nordwestmecklenburg district
- Interactive map of Siemz-Niendorf
- Location within Germany Location within Mecklenburg-Vorpommern
- Coordinates: 53°49′N 10°55′E
- Country: Germany
- State: Mecklenburg-Vorpommern
- District: Nordwestmecklenburg
- Municipal assoc.: Schönberger Land

Area
  - Total: 26.36 km^{2} (10.18 sq mi)
- Elevation: 28 m (92 ft)

Population (2025-12-31)
  - Total: 573
  - Density: 21.7/km^{2} (56.3/sq mi)
- Time zone: UTC+01:00 (CET)
  - Summer (DST): UTC+02:00 (CEST)
- Postal codes: 23923
- Dialling codes: 038828
- Vehicle registration: NWM
- Website: www.schoenberger-land.de/amtsangeh%C3%B6rige-St%C3%A4dte-Gemeinden/Siemz-Niendorf/

Siemz-Niendorf (German pronunciation: [ˈziːmts ˈniːndɔʁf]) is a municipality in the Nordwestmecklenburg district, in Mecklenburg-Vorpommern, Germany. It was created with effect from 26 May 2019 by the merger of the former municipalities of Groß Siemz and Niendorf, composed of several smaller villages, among which Ollndorf.
