= Linstow =

Linstow or von Linstow may refer to:

- Linstow AS, one of the largest companies of Norway
- Dobbin-Linstow, a municipality in the Rostock district, in Mecklenburg-Vorpommern, Germany
- Hans Linstow (1787–1851), a Danish-born, Norwegian architect
- Hans Otfried von Linstow (1899–1944), a German Colonel who took part in the 20 July Plot to assassinate Adolf Hitler
- Otto Friedrich Bernhard von Linstow (1842–1916), a German high-ranking medical officer and helminthologist
