= Mönkhagen =

- Municipality
- Coat of arms

- Location of Mönkhagen within Stormarn district
- Interactive map of Mönkhagen
- Location within Germany Location within Schleswig-Holstein
- Coordinates: 53°54′0″N 10°33′27″E
- Country: Germany
- State: Schleswig-Holstein
- District: Stormarn
- Municipal assoc.: Nordstormarn

Government
  - Mayor: Klaus Bleiziffer

Area
  - Total: 7.3 km^{2} (2.8 sq mi)
- Elevation: 48 m (157 ft)

Population (2025-12-31)
  - Total: 640
  - Density: 88/km^{2} (230/sq mi)
- Time zone: UTC+01:00 (CET)
  - Summer (DST): UTC+02:00 (CEST)
- Postal codes: 23619
- Dialling codes: 04506
- Vehicle registration: OD
- Website: www.amt-nordstormarn.de

Mönkhagen is a municipality in the district of Stormarn, in Schleswig-Holstein, Germany.
