= Weede, Schleswig-Holstein =

- Municipality
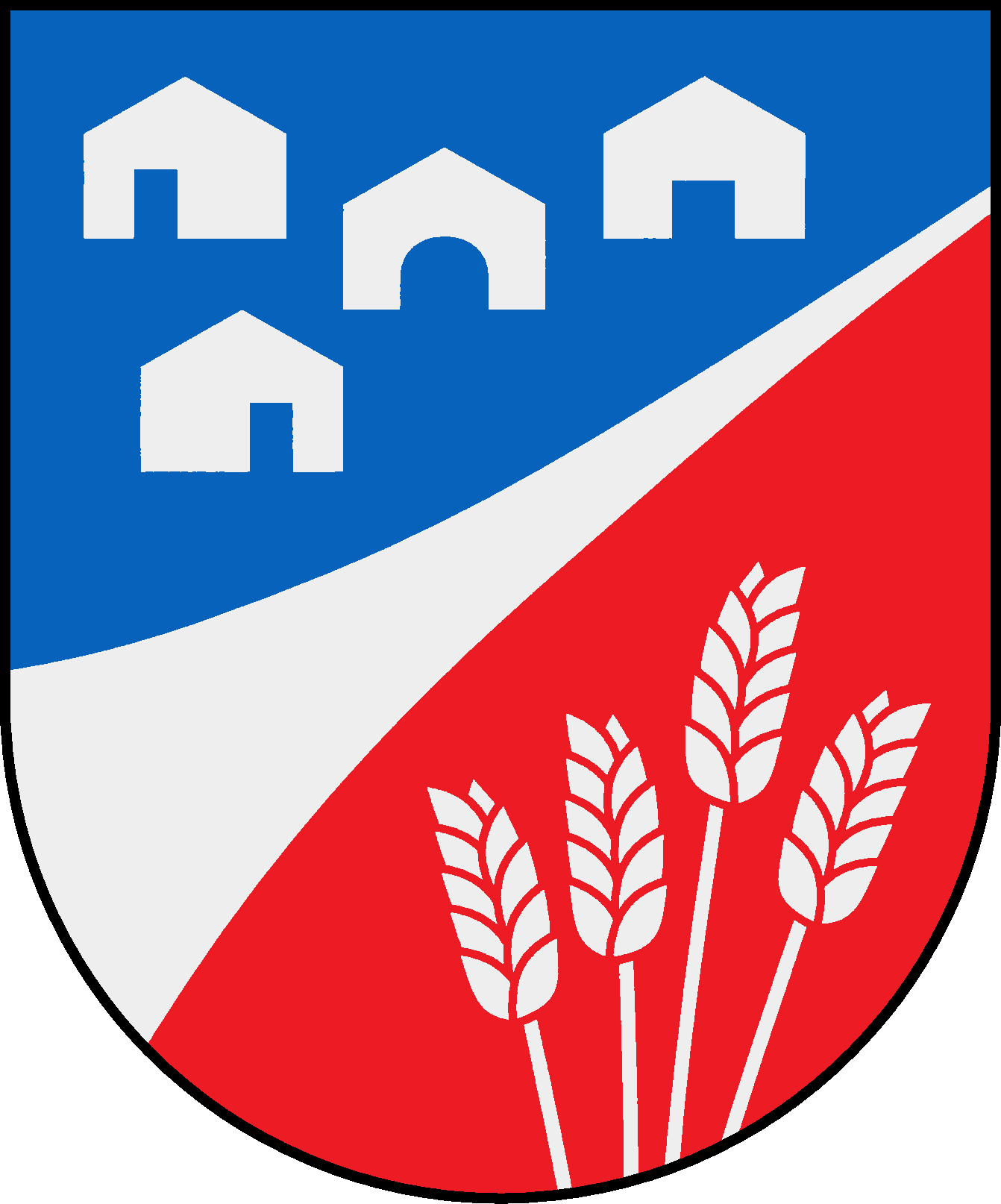
- Coat of arms

- Location of Weede, Schleswig-Holstein within Segeberg district
- Interactive map of Weede, Schleswig-Holstein
- Location within Germany Location within Schleswig-Holstein
- Coordinates: 53°55′N 10°23′E
- Country: Germany
- State: Schleswig-Holstein
- District: Segeberg
- Municipal assoc.: Trave-Land

Government
  - Mayor: Bernd Sulimma

Area
  - Total: 16.41 km^{2} (6.34 sq mi)
- Elevation: 39 m (128 ft)

Population (2025-12-31)
  - Total: 955
  - Density: 58.2/km^{2} (151/sq mi)
- Time zone: UTC+01:00 (CET)
  - Summer (DST): UTC+02:00 (CEST)
- Postal codes: 23795
- Dialling codes: 04551 (Weede/Mielsdorf) 04553 (Steinbek/Söhren)
- Vehicle registration: SE
- Website: www.amt-trave- land.de

Weede (German pronunciation: [ˈveːdə]) is a municipality in the district of Segeberg, in Schleswig-Holstein, Germany.
