= Geschendorf =

- Municipality
- Coat of arms

- Location of Geschendorf within Segeberg district
- Interactive map of Geschendorf
- Location within Germany Location within Schleswig-Holstein
- Coordinates: 53°55′23″N 10°26′41″E
- Country: Germany
- State: Schleswig-Holstein
- District: Segeberg
- Municipal assoc.: Trave-Land

Government
  - Mayor: Dirk Wacker

Area
  - Total: 5.7 km^{2} (2.2 sq mi)
- Elevation: 51 m (167 ft)

Population (2025-12-31)
  - Total: 540
  - Density: 95/km^{2} (250/sq mi)
- Time zone: UTC+01:00 (CET)
  - Summer (DST): UTC+02:00 (CEST)
- Postal codes: 23815
- Dialling codes: 04553
- Vehicle registration: SE
- Website: www.amt-trave- land.de

Geschendorf is a municipality in the district of Segeberg, in Schleswig-Holstein, Germany.
