= Wittenborn =

- Municipality
- Coat of arms

- Location of Wittenborn within Segeberg district
- Interactive map of Wittenborn
- Location within Germany Location within Schleswig-Holstein
- Coordinates: 53°55′N 10°13′E
- Country: Germany
- State: Schleswig-Holstein
- District: Segeberg
- Municipal assoc.: Leezen

Government
  - Mayor: Thorsten Lange (CDU)

Area
  - Total: 6.19 km^{2} (2.39 sq mi)
- Elevation: 38 m (125 ft)

Population (2025-12-31)
  - Total: 1,083
  - Density: 175/km^{2} (453/sq mi)
- Time zone: UTC+01:00 (CET)
  - Summer (DST): UTC+02:00 (CEST)
- Postal codes: 23829
- Dialling codes: 04554
- Vehicle registration: SE
- Website: www.amt-leezen.de

Wittenborn is a municipality in the district of Segeberg, in Schleswig-Holstein, Germany.
