= Niederelbe =

River in Germany

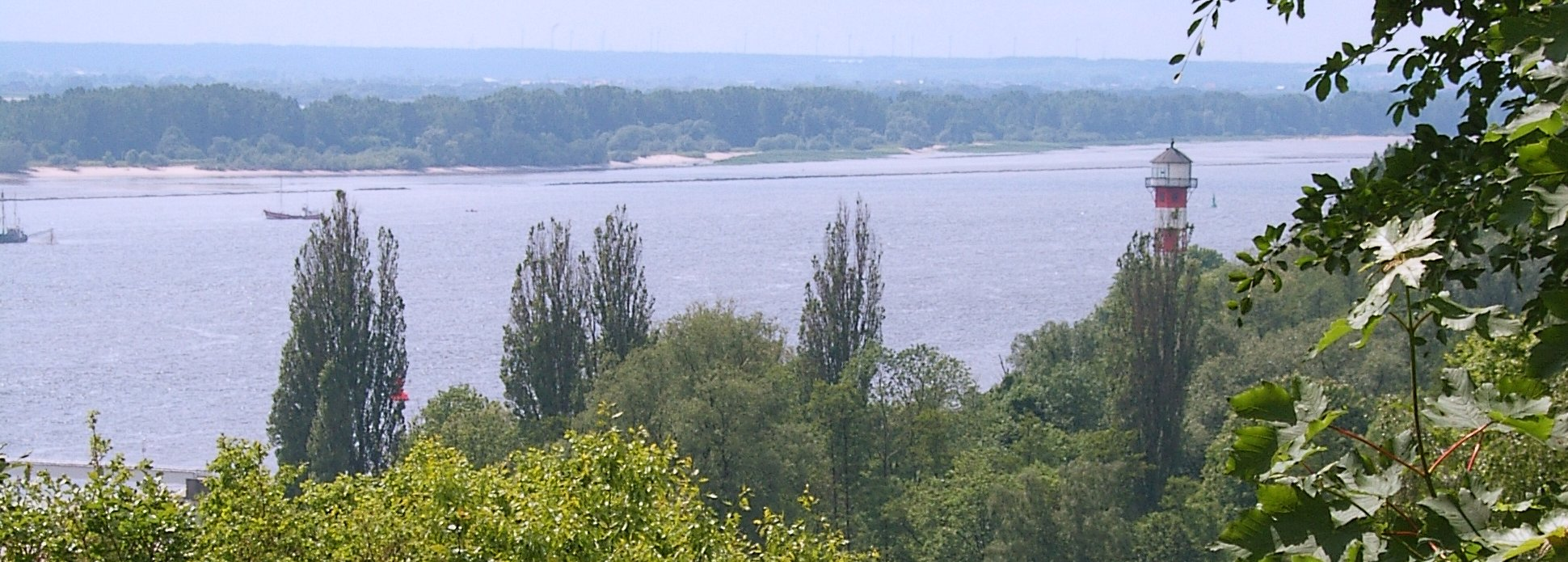
- The Lower Elbe at Rissen, Hamburg

Location
- Country: Germany
- State: Hamburg–Cuxhaven

Physical characteristics
- Length: 108 km (67 mi)
- Width
  - minimum: 2 km (1.2 mi)
  - maximum: 18 km (11 mi)
- Depth
  - maximum: 30 m (98 ft)

Basin features
- River system: Elbe

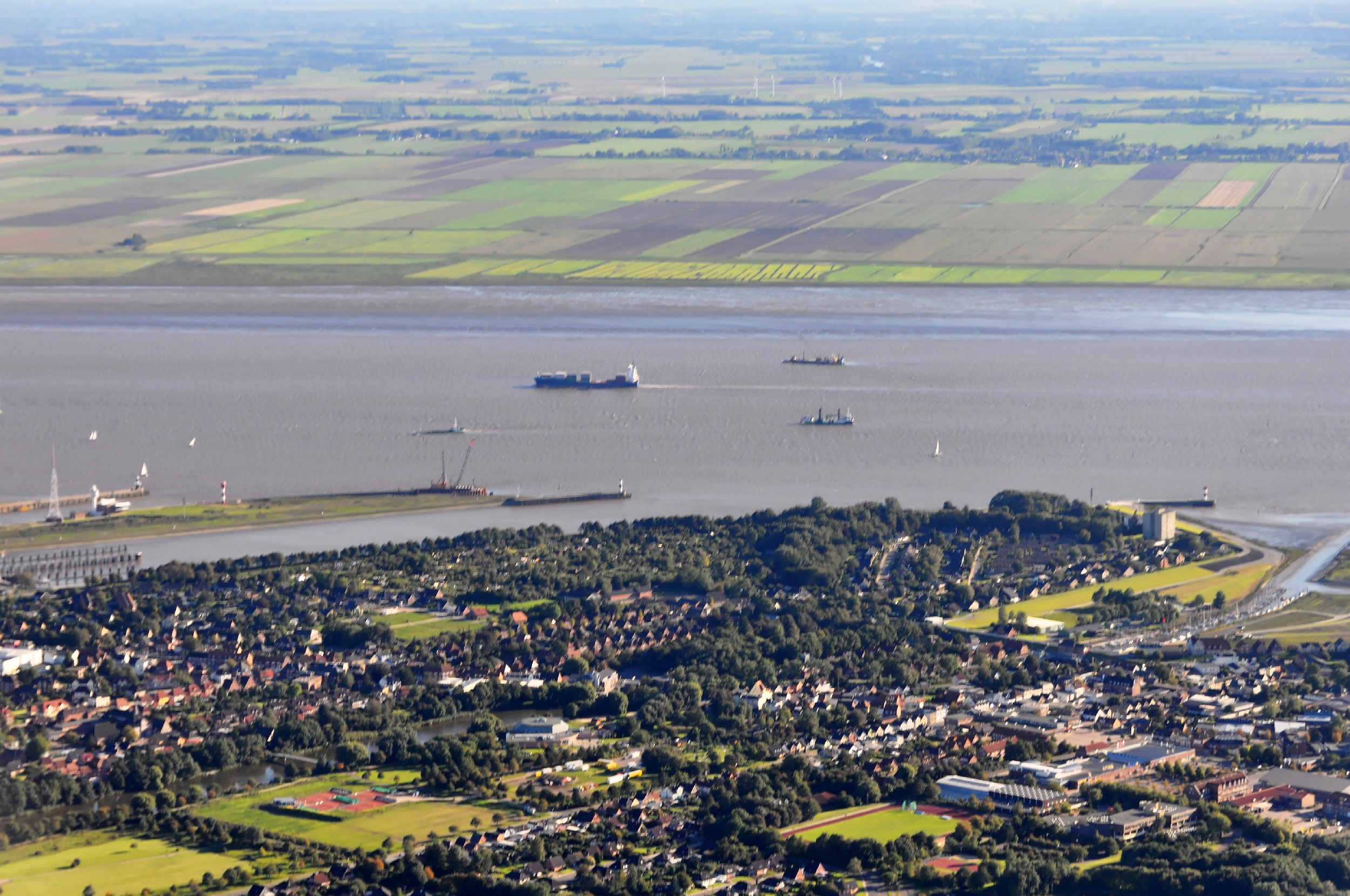
Aerial photo of the Elbe near Brunsbüttel

The Niederelbe (i.e. Lower Elbe) is a 108 kilometers (67 miles) long section of the river Elbe, from western Hamburg downstream to its mouth into the North Sea near Cuxhaven. Starting at Mühlenberger Loch (or Elbe kilometer 634) near Finkenwerder, Hamburg, it gradually widens from 2 km (1.2 mi) to 18 km (11 mi). Once passing the Hamburg state border, the Niederelbe also forms the border between the states of Lower Saxony and Schleswig-Holstein.

The Niederelbe forms part of the Elbe section named the Unterelbe (i. e. Lower ("Under") Elbe), comprising all parts of the Elbe influenced by the North Sea's tides, starting further inland at the sluice in Geesthacht (or Elbe kilometer 586).

== See also ==
- List of rivers of Hamburg
- List of rivers of Lower Saxony
- List of rivers of Schleswig-Holstein
