= Stockelsdorf =

- Municipality
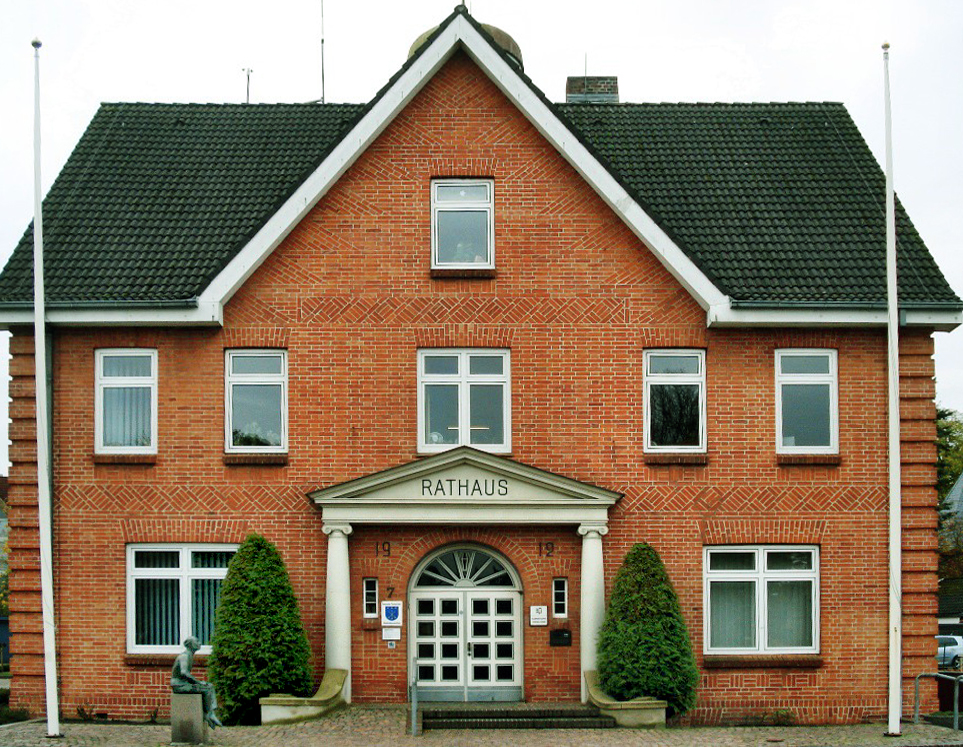
- Town hall of Stockelsdorf

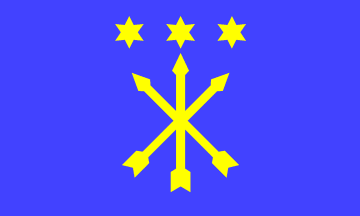
- Flag Coat of arms

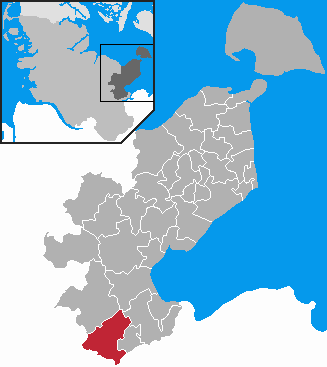
- Location of Stockelsdorf within Ostholstein district
- Interactive map of Stockelsdorf
- Location within Germany Location within Schleswig-Holstein
- Coordinates: 53°53′N 10°39′E
- Country: Germany
- State: Schleswig-Holstein
- District: Ostholstein

Government
  - Mayor: Julia Samtleben

Area
  - Total: 56.7 km^{2} (21.9 sq mi)
- Elevation: 18 m (59 ft)

Population (2025-12-31)
  - Total: 16,309
  - Density: 288/km^{2} (745/sq mi)
- Time zone: UTC+01:00 (CET)
  - Summer (DST): UTC+02:00 (CEST)
- Postal codes: 23612, 23617
- Dialling codes: 0451
- Vehicle registration: OH
- Website: stockelsdorf.de

Stockelsdorf is a municipality in the district of Ostholstein, in Schleswig-Holstein, Germany. It is situated directly northwest of Lübeck and forms an agglomeration with the easterly town of Bad Schwartau. The municipality contains the villages of Arfrade, Curau, Dissau, Eckhorst, Horsdorf, Klein Parin, Krumbeck, Malkendorf, Obernwohlde and Pohnsdorf.

By measure of population Stockelsdorf is the second largest municipality without town status in Schleswig-Holstein.

== Partner towns ==
- (France) Le Portel, Department Pas-de-Calais
- Okonek, Greater Poland Voivodeship
