= Warnow Tunnel =

German road tunnel

Coordinates: 54°08′06″N 12°05′37″E

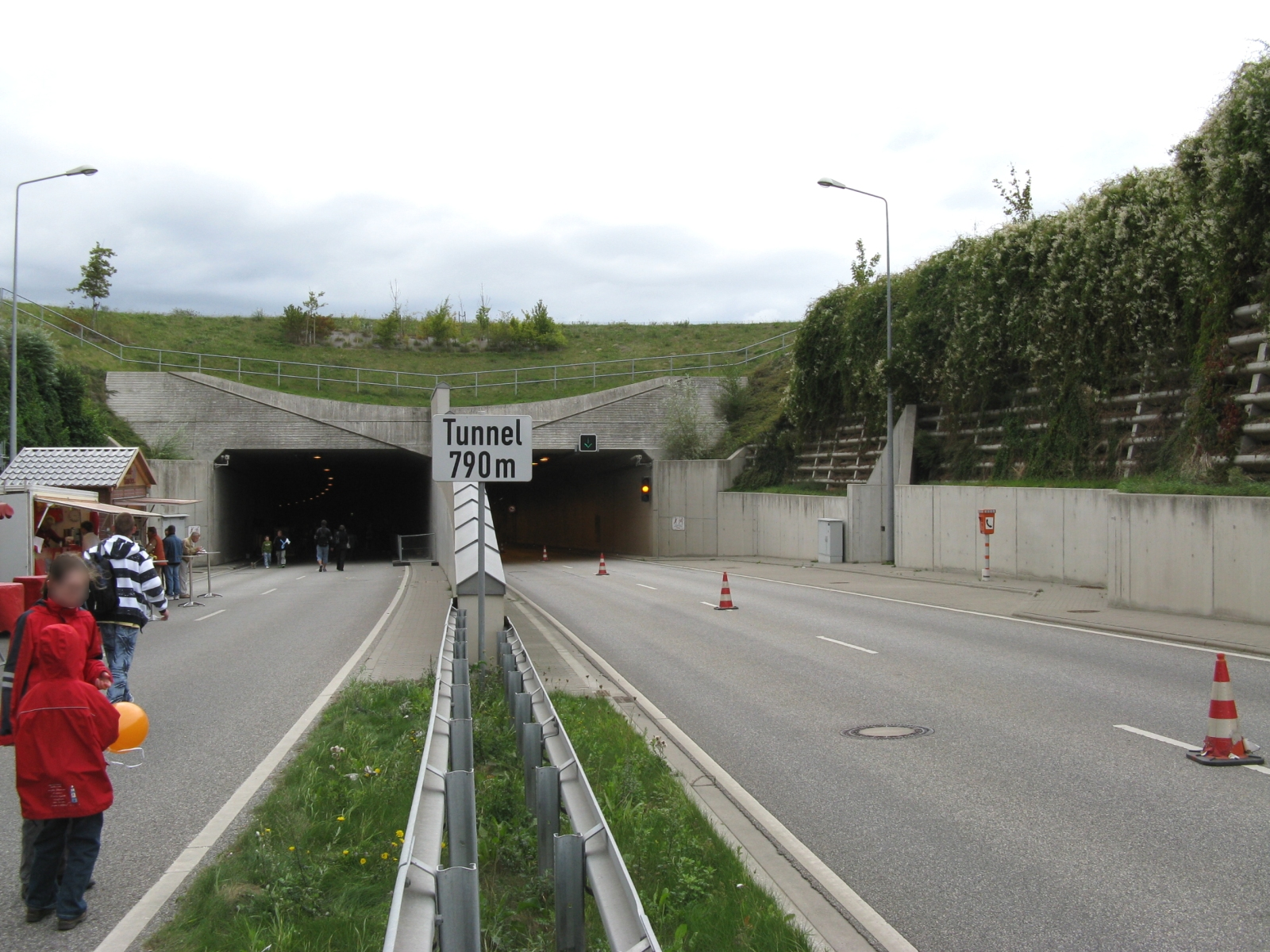
- Warnow Tunnel in Rostock.

Overview
- Location: Rostock
- Status: Active
- Crosses: Warnow river

Operation
- Work began: 1999
- Opened: 2003
- Operator: Atlas Arteria
- Traffic: Automotive

Technical
- Length: 790 m (2,590 ft)
- Towpath: yes

Route map
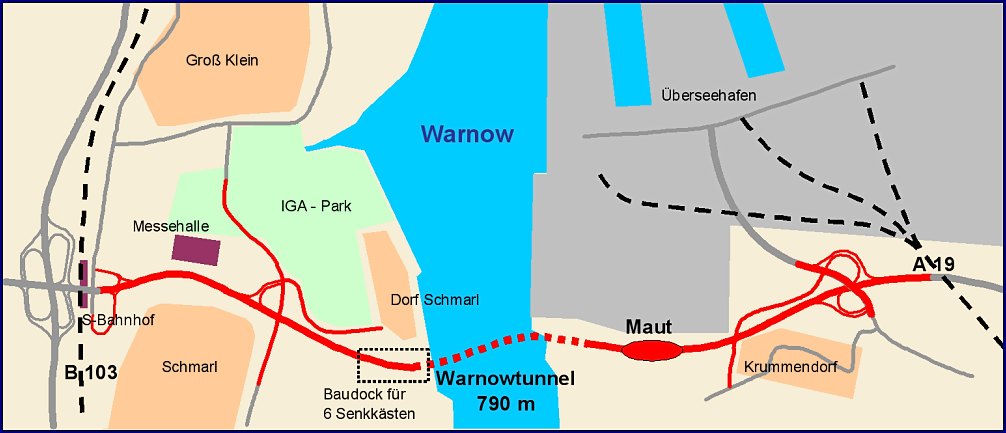

The Warnow Tunnel (also known as the Warnow River Crossing and the Warnowquerung in German) is a road tunnel 790 m long which connects the east and west bank of the Warnow river in the Hanseatic city of Rostock in Mecklenburg-Vorpommern, Germany.

== History ==
It is Germany's first toll road in modern times and Germany's first privately financed transport project. The construction cost of 220 million euros was financed by Bouygues Travaux Publics (France), Macquarie Infrastructure Corporation (Australia), and 14 banks. It was inaugurated on 12 September 2003 by the Federal Transport Minister Dr. Manfred Stolpe.

By 2006, the tunnel was close to bankruptcy. Only 10,500 vehicles were crossing it daily, compared to the expected 20,000. The operating concession was extended from 30 to 50 years to make it more profitable for its operator.

The 50-year operating concession is held by Warnowquerung GmbH & Co. KG, which is 70% owned by the Australian investment company Atlas Arteria which operates many tolled roads worldwide. On 15 August 2018, Atlas Arteria announced an agreement to acquire the remaining 30%.

In November 2015, the fare to cross the tunnel was raised to cope with high maintenance costs. By September 2020, 67 million cars had driven through the tunnel since it opened.

== Engineering ==
The tunnel was built using a technique known as immersed tube construction: the main part of the tunnel consists of six prefabricated concrete conduits which were formed and poured in a temporary drydock nearby, floated out into the river and lowered into a dredged channel in the river bottom. This is a technique apparently pioneered in the Detroit River in construction of the Detroit–Windsor Tunnel in 1930, and replicated for sub-aqueous tunnels ever since.
