= Bokel, Pinneberg =

Bokel
- Municipality
- Coat of arms

- Location of Bokel within Pinneberg district
- Interactive map of Bokel
- Location within Germany Location within Schleswig-Holstein
- Coordinates: 53°51′53″N 9°44′2″E
- Country: Germany
- State: Schleswig-Holstein
- District: Pinneberg
- Municipal assoc.: Hörnerkirchen

Government
  - Mayor: Wolfgang Münster

Area
  - Total: 16.02 km^{2} (6.19 sq mi)
- Elevation: 16 m (52 ft)

Population (2025-12-31)
  - Total: 558
  - Density: 34.8/km^{2} (90.2/sq mi)
- Time zone: UTC+01:00 (CET)
  - Summer (DST): UTC+02:00 (CEST)
- Postal codes: 25364
- Dialling codes: 04127
- Vehicle registration: PI
- Website: www.amt- hoernerkirchen.de

Bokel (German pronunciation: [ˈboːkl̩]) is a municipality in the district of Pinneberg, in Schleswig-Holstein, Germany.
