= Marlow, Germany =

Town in Mecklenburg-Vorpommern, Germany

Marlow
- Town
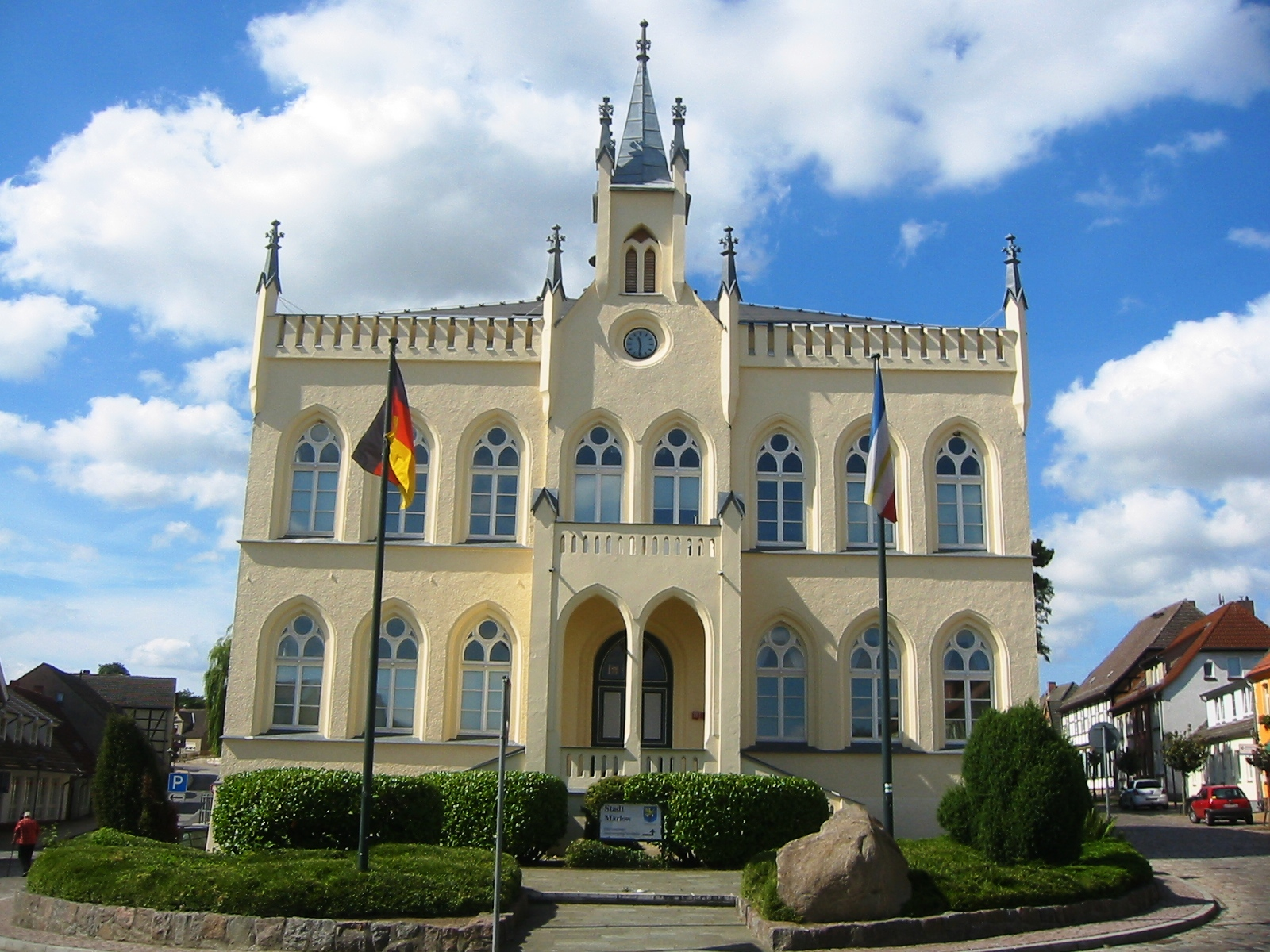

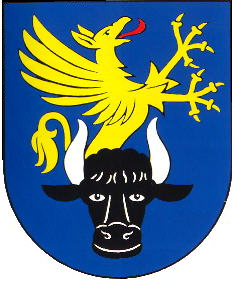
- Coat of arms

- Location of Marlow within Vorpommern-Rügen district
- Interactive map of Marlow
- Location within Germany Location within Mecklenburg-Vorpommern
- Coordinates: 54°08′N 12°34′E
- Country: Germany
- State: Mecklenburg-Vorpommern
- District: Vorpommern-Rügen
- Subdivisions: 26

Government
  - Mayor: Heino Schütt (CDU)

Area
  - Total: 140.52 km^{2} (54.26 sq mi)
- Elevation: 40 m (130 ft)

Population (2025-12-31)
  - Total: 4,449
  - Density: 31.66/km^{2} (82.00/sq mi)
- Time zone: UTC+01:00 (CET)
  - Summer (DST): UTC+02:00 (CEST)
- Postal codes: 18337
- Dialling codes: 038221
- Vehicle registration: NVP
- Website: www.stadt-marlow.de

Marlow (German pronunciation: [ˈmaʁloː]) is a municipality in the Vorpommern-Rügen district, in Mecklenburg-Western Pomerania, Germany. It is situated 14 km southeast of Ribnitz-Damgarten.

== Sights ==
Marlow is well known for the Vogelpark Marlow, a zoo with the focus on birds, in an area of 22 hectares (54 acres).
