= Oldenburg Hauptbahnhof =

Railway station in Oldenburg, Germany

Oldenburg (Oldb) Hbf
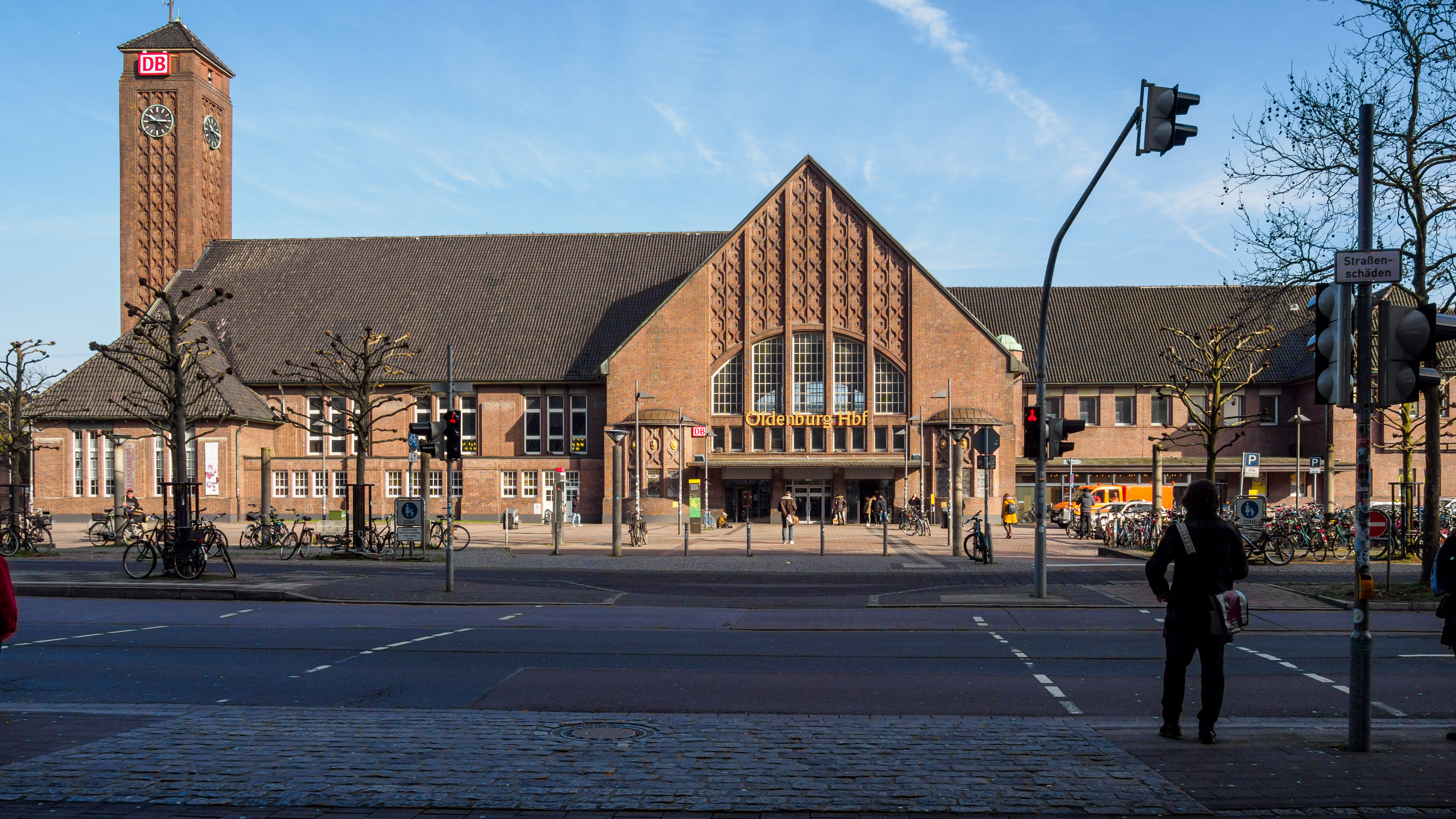
- Entrance of the station building

General information
- Location: Oldenburg (Oldenburg), Lower Saxony; Germany
- Coordinates: 53°08′37″N 08°13′21″E
- Owner: Deutsche Bahn
- Operator: DB Station&Service
- Lines: Bremen–Oldenburg (KBS 390); Oldenburg–Leer (KBS 390); Wilhelmshaven–Oldenburg (KBS 392); Oldenburg–Osnabrück (KBS 392)
- Platforms: 7

Construction
- Accessible: Yes
- Architectural style: Art Nouveau

Other information
- Station code: 4765
- DS100 code: HOLD
- IBNR: 8000291
- Category: 2
- Fare zone: VBN: 740
- Website: www.bahnhof.de

History
- Opened: 1915
Services
Preceding station	DB Fernverkehr	Following station
Terminus	ICE 16	Delmenhorst towards Berlin Südkreuz
Terminus	ICE 26	Delmenhorst towards Karlsruhe Hbf
Bad Zwischenahn towards Norddeich Mole	IC 56	Hude towards Leipzig Hbf or Cottbus Hbf
Preceding station	DB Regio Nord	Following station
Bad Zwischenahn towards Norddeich Mole	RE 1	Hude towards Hannover Hbf
Preceding station	NordWestBahn	Following station
Rastede towards Wilhelmshaven	RE 18	Sandkrug towards Osnabrück Hbf
Rastede towards Esens(Ostfriesl)	RB 59 Limited service	Sandkrug One-way operation
Preceding station	Bremen S-Bahn	Following station
Oldenburg-Wechloy towards Bad Zwischenahn	RS3	Wüsting towards Bremen Hbf
Rastede towards Wilhelmshaven	RS3	Terminus
Oldenburg-Wechloy towards Bad Zwischenahn	RS30	Hude towards Bremen Hbf
Location

Oldenburg Hauptbahnhof (originally Oldenburg Centralbahnhof) is the main passenger station in the city of Oldenburg in the German state of Lower Saxony. It is a through station, with seven platform tracks. Its large reception hall was built in the Art Nouveau style.

It is one of two stations in Oldenburg open to passengers, the other one being the newly-constructed Oldenburg-Wechloy suburban rail station opened in 2015 in the vicinity of the University of Oldenburg. Older stations, including Ofenerdiek and Osternburg, have had their passenger service gradually removed over the course of previous decades.

== History ==
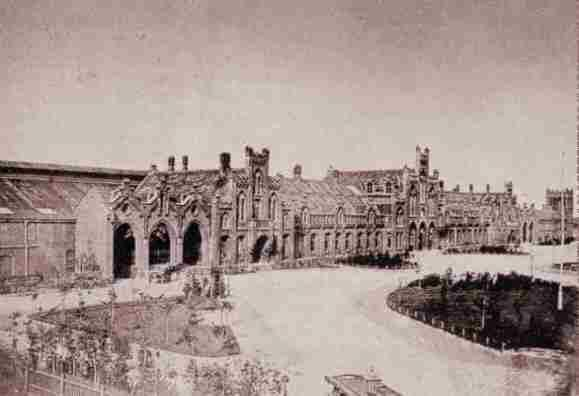
Original central station in 1885

The first railway in the capital of the Grand Duchy of Oldenburg was the line from Oldenburg to Bremen via Delmenhorst opened by the Grand Duchy of Oldenburg State Railways on 15 July 1867. On 3 September 1867, a line was opened from Oldenburg to Heppens (later renamed Wilhelmshaven), financed by the Prussian government. The line was operated by the Oldenburg State Railways, which in 1913 bought the line from Prussia, placing an enormous burden on the state's budget. On 15 June 1869, the Oldenburg–Leer line was opened. On 15 October 1875, the Oldenburg State Railways opened the Oldenburg–Osnabrück line.

The first Oldenburg station was planned to be built in today's Cäcilienplatz. In 1868, it became clear that the proposed building would be too small for the growing demand. Therefore, the project was never realized. Instead, a converted freight shed served as Oldenburg's station for twelve years.

On 21 May 1879, the Central Station was finally inaugurated as the first "real" station in Oldenburg at the site of the present station.

The station was inaugurated on 3 August 1915. The Art Nouveau building was designed by the architect, Friedrich Mettegang. A separate building was planned for the Grand Duke of Oldenburg to board trains, called Prince Hall. As part of the new building the tracks were raised by about 3.25 meters (10 ft 8 in). The building was placed at the edge of the tracks, so that the station could be rebuilt as a through station. Up to that time, travellers who wanted to continue past Oldenburg had to change trains. In 1992 the line was electrified from Oldenburg to Leer.

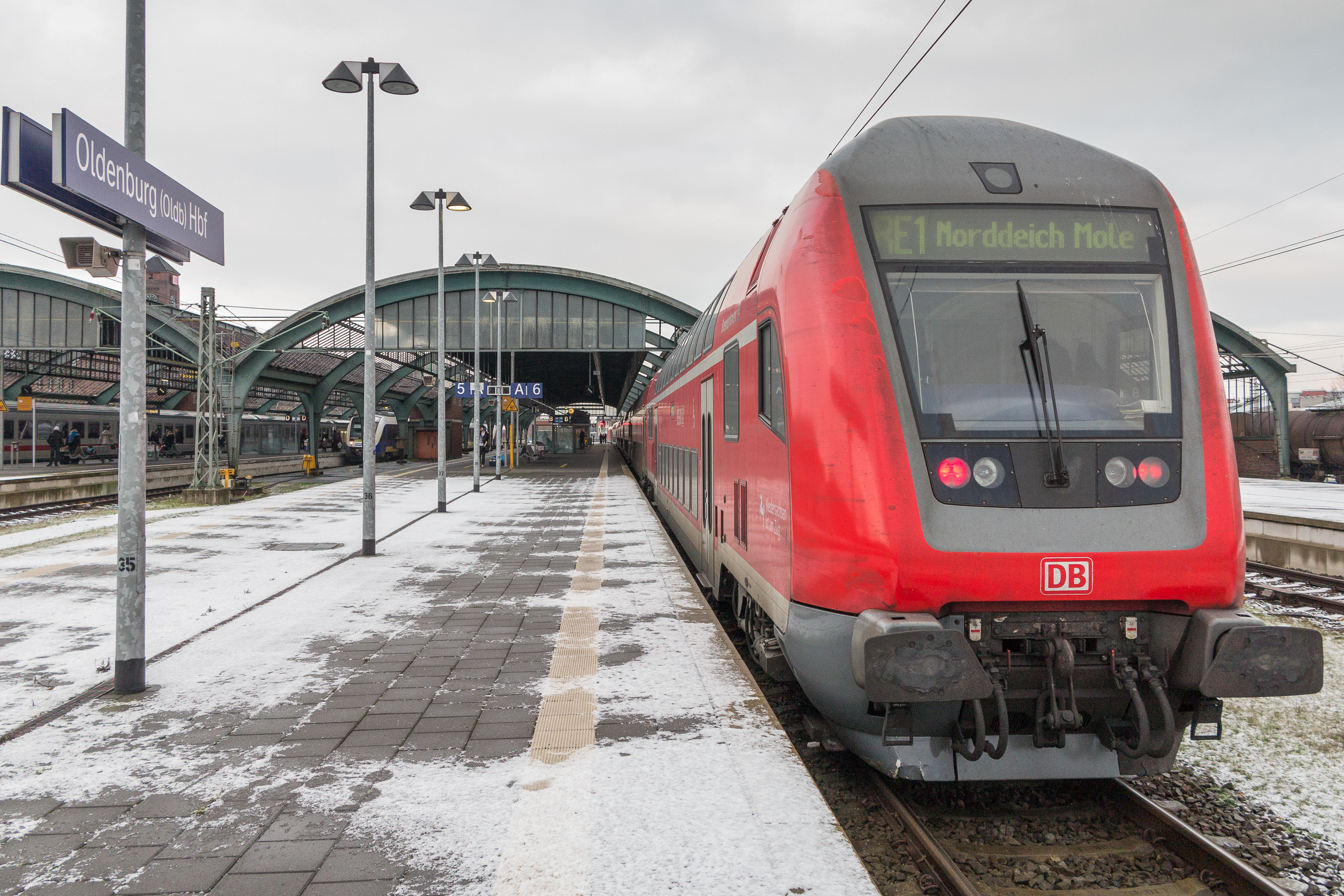
Platform

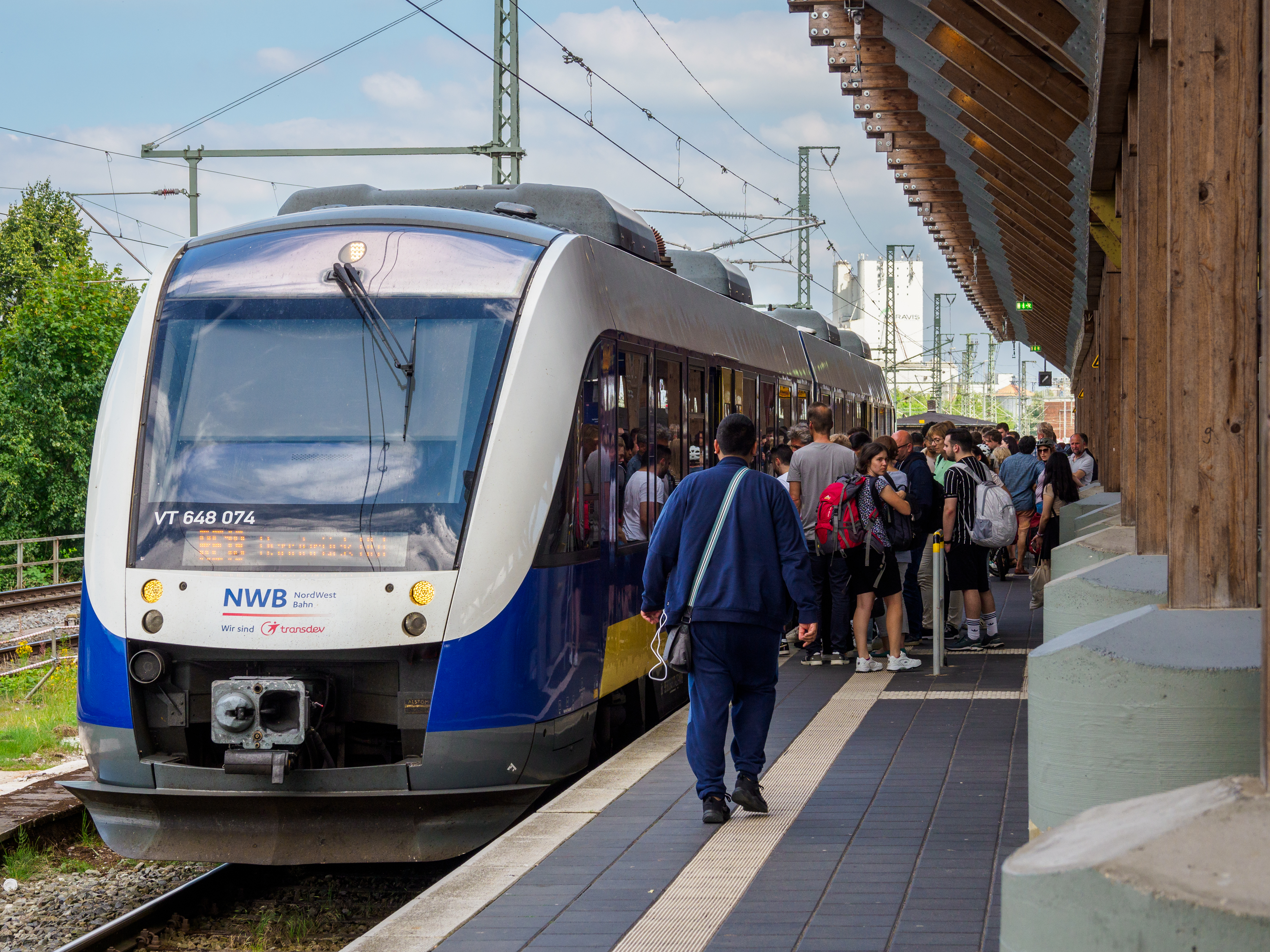
Local train

== Connections ==
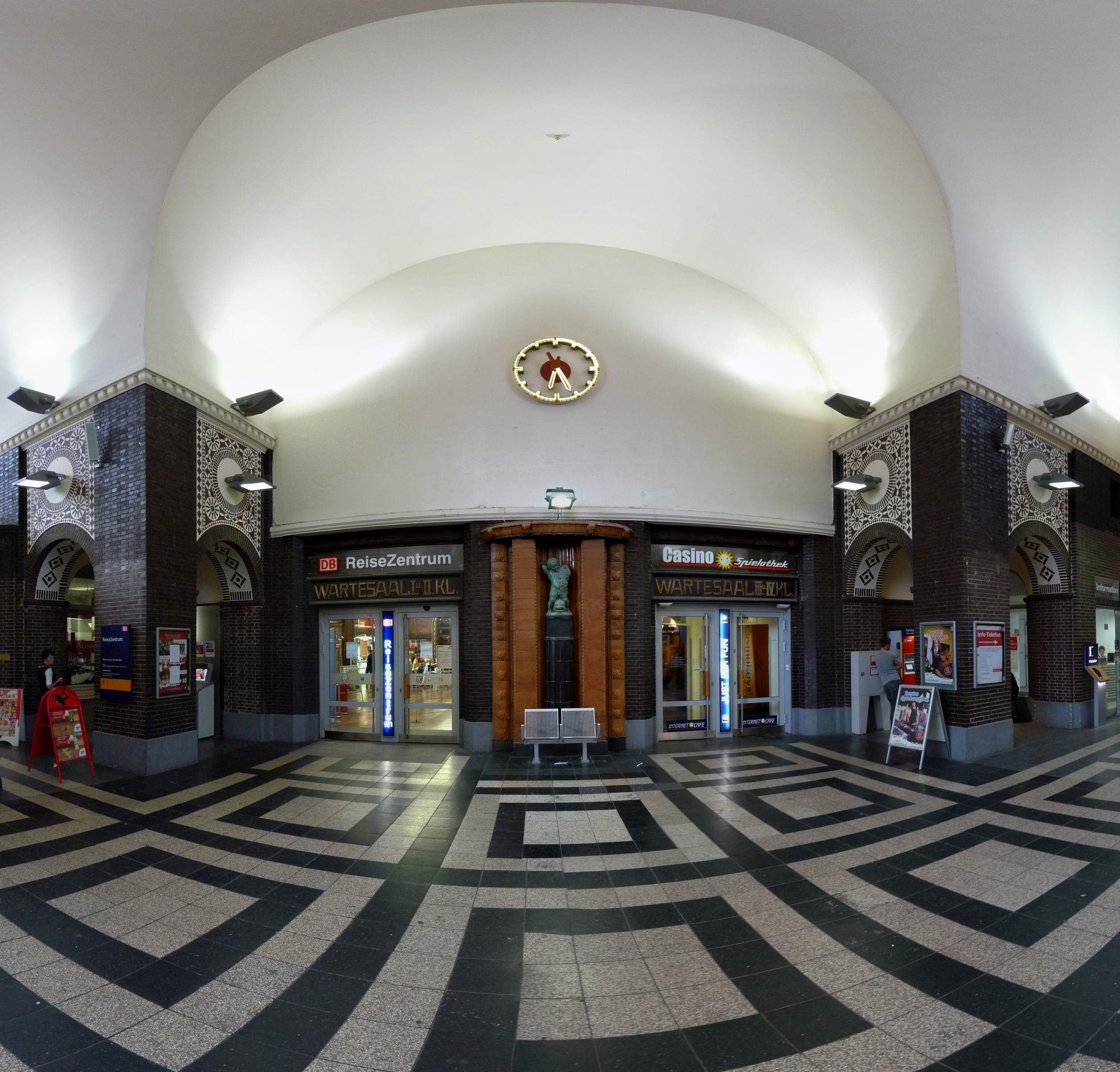
Main hall

The station's track 1 is next to the main building and it has three Island platforms, numbered as tracks 3/4, 5/6, and 7/8. Track 2 is a through track without a platform.

Platform	Route	Train category
1	Bremen – Hanover	Regional-Express
2 (no platform)	All routes	Freight trains
3	Hanover – Leipzig or Munich, Norddeich Mole	ICE, InterCity
4	Osnabrück, Bremen	NordWestBahn
5	Wilhelmshaven, Esens	NordWestBahn
6	Leer – Emden – Norddeich Mole	InterCity, Regional-Express
7	Bremen	Regionalbahn
8	Hude, Magdeburg and other stations	Regionalbahn, InterCity, special trains
9 (no platform)	Freight	Freight trains
10 (no platform)	Freight	Freight trains

== Train services ==
In the 2026 timetable, the following long-distance services stop at the station:

Line	Route			Frequency
ICE 16	Oldenburg – Bremen – Hanover – Berlin – Berlin Südkreuz			One train pair
ICE 26	Oldenburg – Bremen – Hanover – Göttingen – Kassel-Wilhelmshöhe – Marburg – Frankfurt – Heidelberg – Karlsruhe			One train pair
IC 56	Emden Außenhafen –	Emden – Oldenburg – Bremen – Hanover – Magdeburg Hauptbahnhof –	Berlin – Cottbus	60 min
IC 56	Norddeich Mole –	Emden – Oldenburg – Bremen – Hanover – Magdeburg Hauptbahnhof –	Leipzig – Dresden	60 min

The main long-distance service through Oldenburg is the IC 56 InterCity service operating at two-hour intervals to Leipzig via Hanover. In addition, Intercity-Express trains operate once a day on several routes.

In the 2026 timetable, the following regional services stop at the station:

Line	Route	Frequency
RE 1	Hannover Hbf – Wunstorf – Nienburg (Weser) – Verden (Aller) – Bremen Hbf – Delmenhorst – Hude – Oldenburg (Oldb) Hbf – Bad Zwischenahn – Leer – Emden Hbf – Norden – Norddeich Mole	120 mins
RE 18	Osnabrück Hbf – Bramsche – Cloppenburg – Oldenburg (Oldb) Hbf – Varel – Wilhelmshaven	60 mins
RB 59	Esens – Oldenburg – Cloppenburg – Quakenbrück – Bramsche – Osnabrück Altstadt – Osnabrück	1 train Sa
RS3	Bremen Hbf – Bremen Neustadt – Heidkrug – Delmenhorst – Hoykenkamp – Schierbrok – Bookholzberg – Hude – Wüsting – Oldenburg (Oldb) Hbf (– Oldenburg-Wechloy – Bad Zwischenahn)	60 mins
RS3	Oldenburg (Oldb) Hbf – Rastede – Jaderberg – Varel (Oldb) – Sande – Wilhelmshaven	120/180 mins (weekdays during the day)
RS30	Bremen Hbf – Delmenhorst – Hude – Oldenburg (Oldb) Hbf – Oldenburg-Wechloy – Bad Zwischenahn	60 mins
