= Hude station =

Railway station in Hude, Germany

Hude
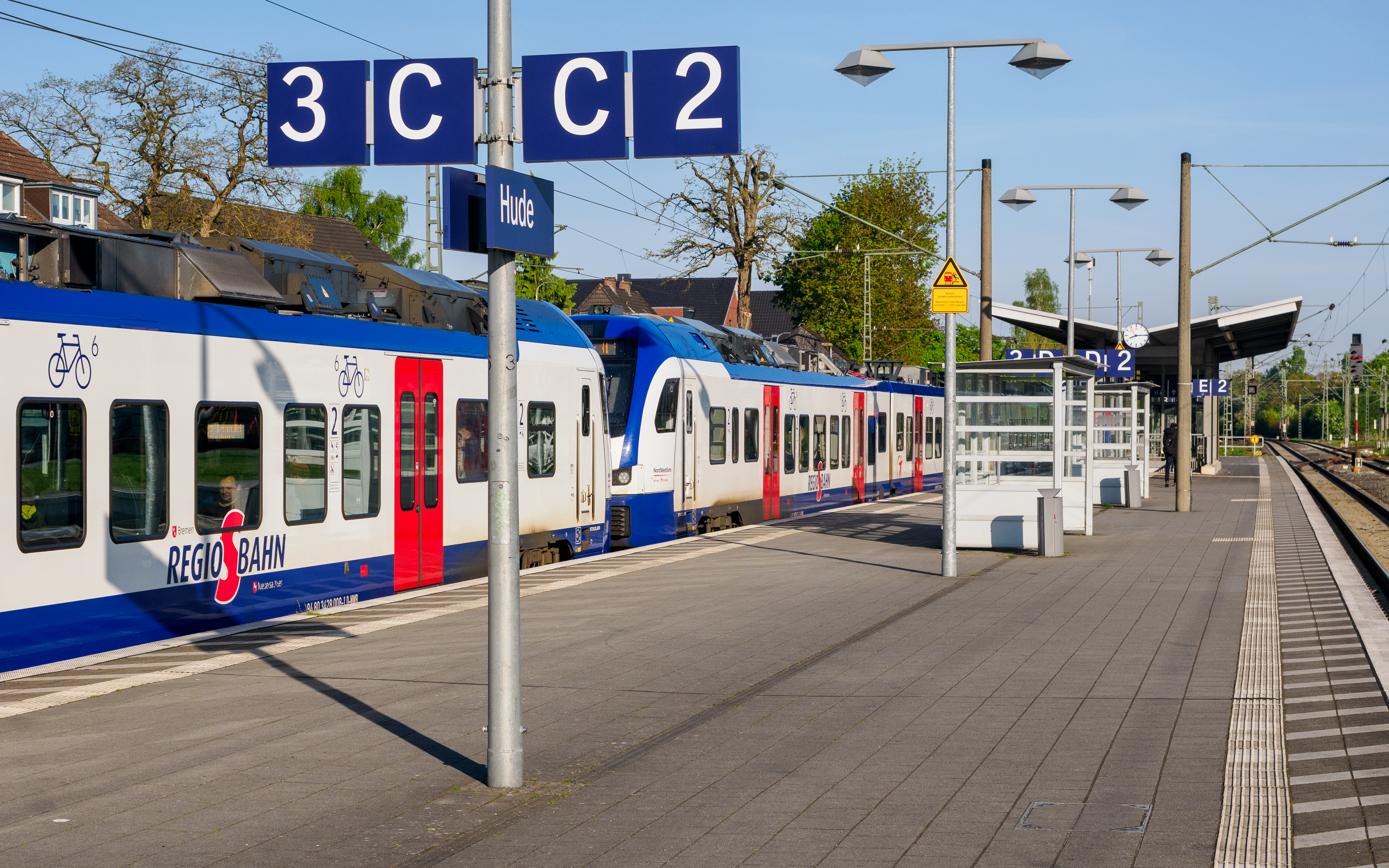
- Hude railway station

General information
- Location: Hude, Lower Saxony; Germany
- Coordinates: 53.1100°N 8.4607°E
- Platforms: 2

Construction
- Accessible: Yes

Other information
- Station code: 5
- DS100 code: HHUD
- Category: 2938
- Fare zone: VBN: 730
- Website: www.bahnhof.de

Services
Preceding station	DB Fernverkehr	Following station
Oldenburg Hbf towards Emden Außenhafen or Norddeich Mole	IC 56	Delmenhorst towards Leipzig Hbf or Cottbus Hbf
Preceding station	DB Regio Nord	Following station
Oldenburg Hbf towards Norddeich Mole	RE 1	Delmenhorst towards Hannover Hbf
Preceding station	Bremen S-Bahn	Following station
Wüsting towards Bad Zwischenahn	RS3	Bookholzberg towards Bremen Hbf
Wüsting towards Bad Zwischenahn	RS30	Delmenhorst towards Bremen Hbf
Berne towards Nordenham	RS4	Bookholzberg towards Bremen Hbf
Location

Hude (German: Bahnhof Hude) is a railway station located in Hude, Germany. The station is located on the Oldenburg–Bremen railway. The train services are operated by Deutsche Bahn and NordWestBahn. The station has been part of the Bremen S-Bahn since December 2010.

== Train services ==
The following services currently call at the station:

Line	Route	Frequency
IC 56	Emden Außenhafen – / Norddeich Mole – Emden – Leer – Bad Zwischenahn – Oldenburg – Hude – Delmenhorst – Bremen – Verden – Nienburg – Hannover – Braunschweig – Magdeburg – Halle – Leipzig	120 min
RE 1	Norddeich Mole – Emden Hbf – Leer – Bad Zwischenahn – Oldenburg – Hude – Delmenhorst – Bremen – Verden – Nienburg – Wunstorf – Hannover Hbf	120 min
RS3	Bremen Hbf – Hude – Oldenburg Hauptbahnhof (– Bad Zwischenahn)	60 min
RS30	Bremen Hbf – Hude – Oldenburg Hauptbahnhof – Bad Zwischenahn	60 min
RS4	Bremen Hbf – Hude – Oldenburg Hauptbahnhof – Brake – Nordenham	60 min
As of 10 December 2023
