= Wüsting station =

Railway station in Hude, Germany

Wüsting
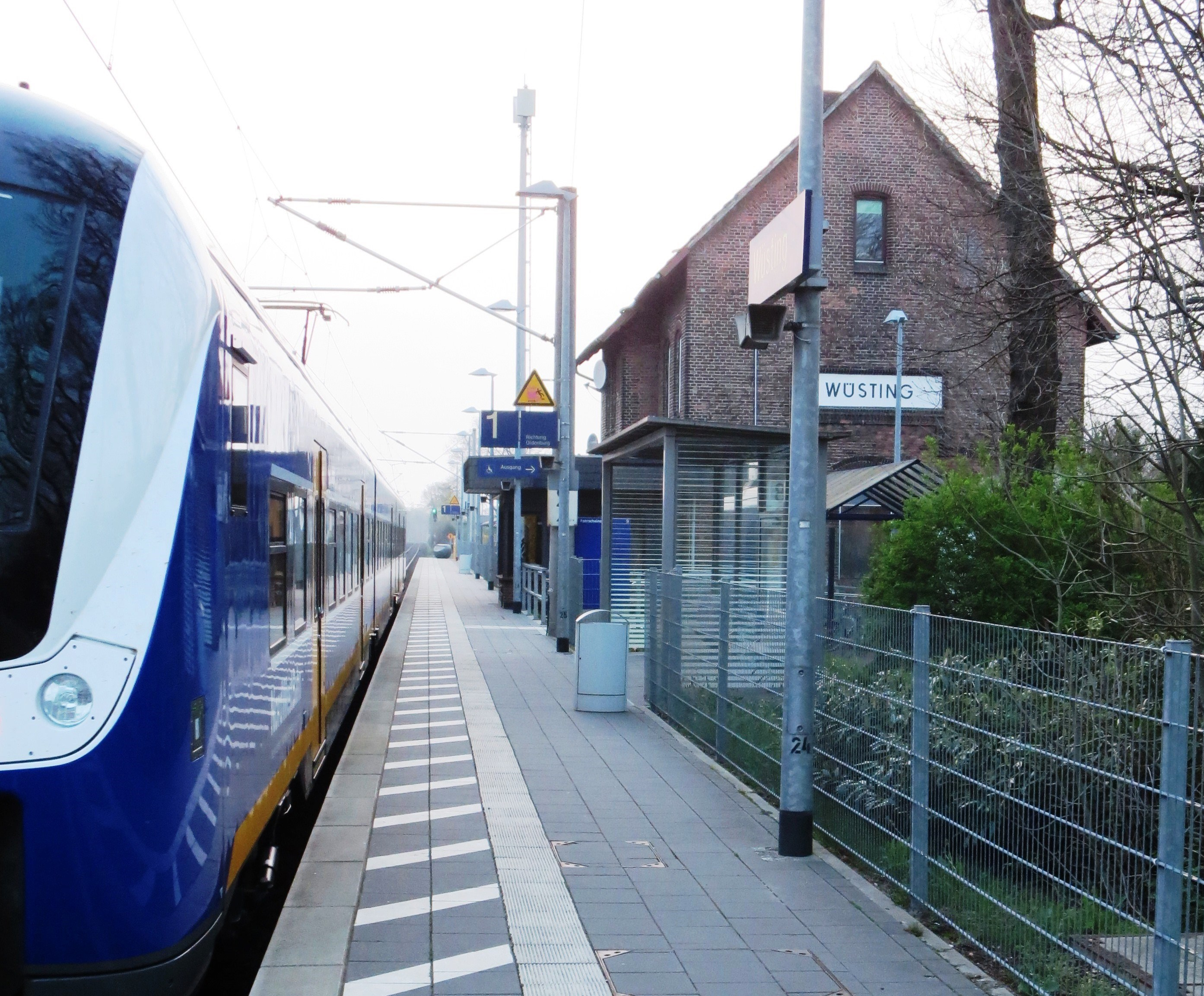
- Wüsting station in 2014

General information
- Location: Wüsting, Lower Saxony; Germany
- Coordinates: 53.11821°N 8.33694°E
- Platforms: 2

Other information
- Fare zone: VBN: 730

Services
Preceding station	Bremen S-Bahn	Following station
Oldenburg Hbf towards Bad Zwischenahn	RS3	Hude towards Bremen Hbf
Location

Wüsting (German: Bahnhof Wüsting) is a railway station located in Wüsting, Germany. The station was re-opened on 10 December 2006 and is located on the Oldenburg–Bremen railway. The train services are operated by NordWestBahn. The station has been part of the Bremen S-Bahn since December 2010.

== Train services ==
The following services currently call at the station:

- Bremen S-Bahn services S3 Bad Zwischenahn - Oldenburg - Delmenhorst - Bremen
