= Bookholzberg station =

Railway station in Ganderkesee, Germany

Bookholzberg
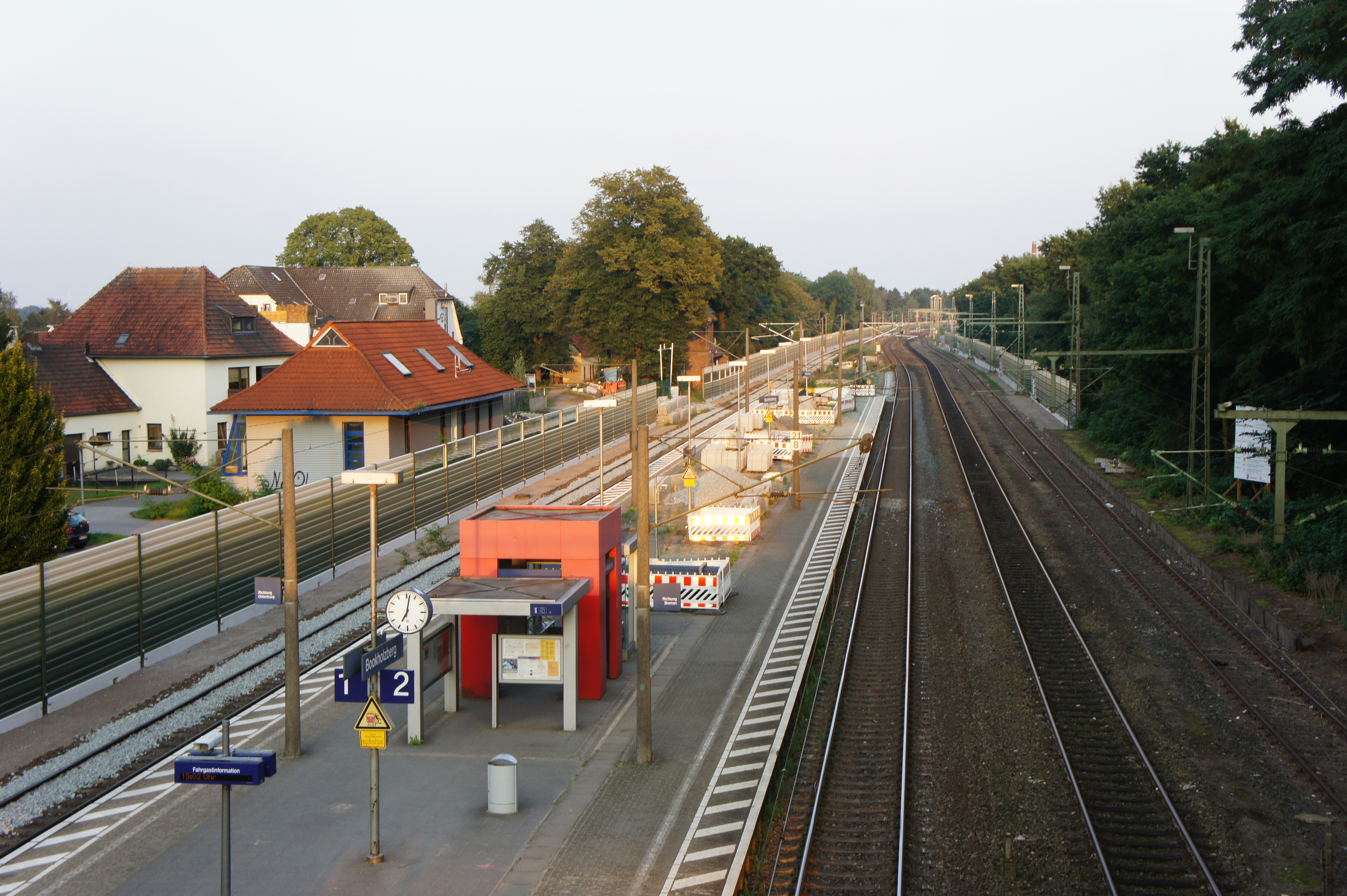
- Bookholzberg railway station in 2015

General information
- Location: Bookholzberg, Lower Saxony; Germany
- Coordinates: 53.09906°N 8.53297°E
- Platforms: 2

Other information
- Fare zone: VBN: 720

Services
Preceding station	Bremen S-Bahn	Following station
Hude towards Bad Zwischenahn	RS3	Schierbrok towards Bremen Hbf
Hude towards Nordenham	RS4	Schierbrok towards Bremen Hbf
Location

Bookholzberg (German: Bahnhof Bookholzberg) is a railway station located in Bookholzberg, Germany. The station is located on the Oldenburg–Bremen railway. The train services are operated by NordWestBahn. The station has been part of the Bremen S-Bahn since December 2010.

== Train services ==
The following services currently call at the station:

- Bremen S-Bahn services S3 Bad Zwischenahn - Oldenburg - Delmenhorst - Bremen
