= Delmenhorst station =

Railway station in Delmenhorst, Germany

Delmenhorst
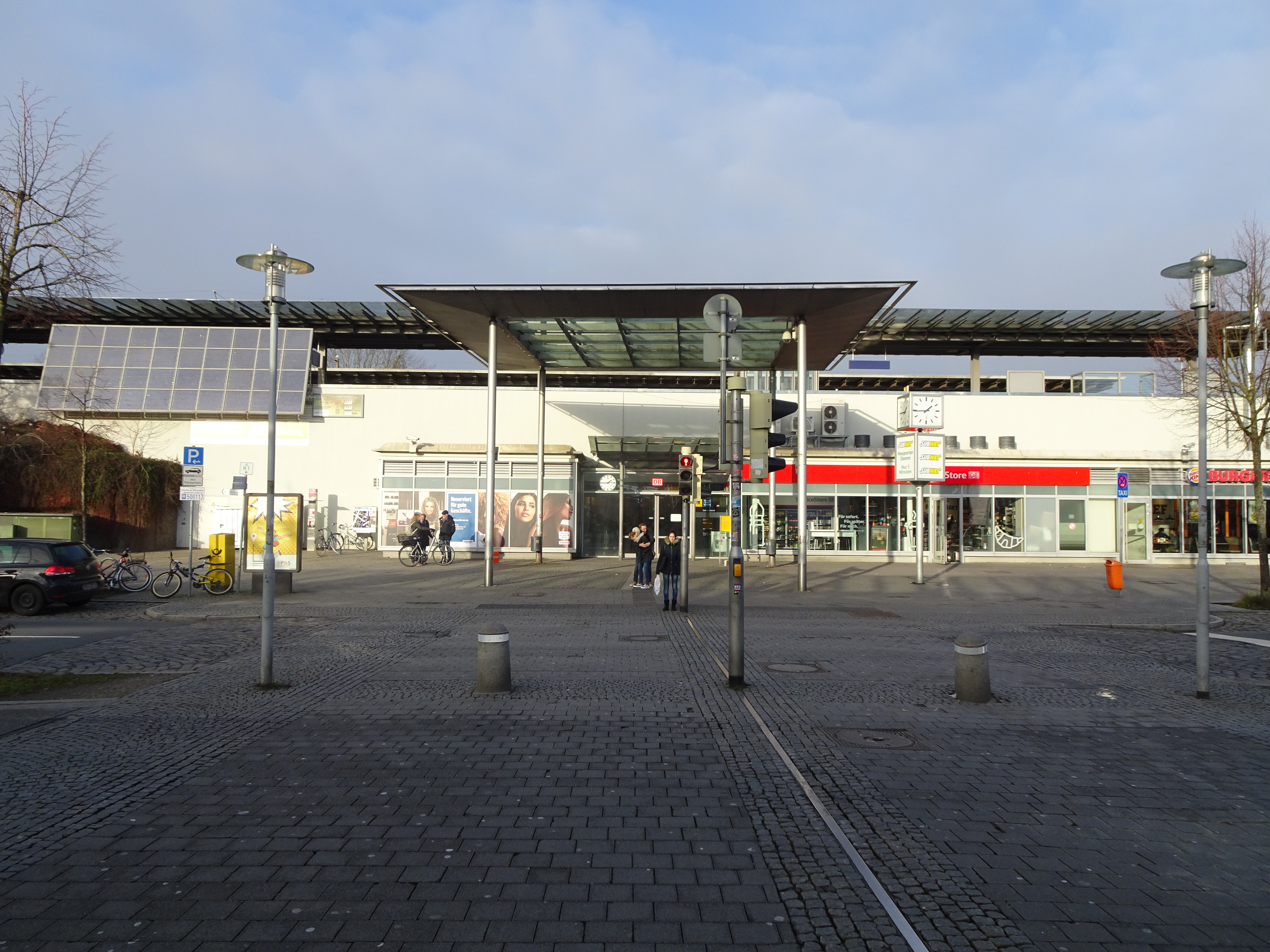
- South entrance (2018)

General information
- Location: Delmenhorst, Lower Saxony; Germany
- Coordinates: 53.0310°N 8.3744°E
- Lines: Oldenburg–Bremen railway Delmenhorst–Hesepe railway
- Platforms: 3

Other information
- Station code: 1159
- DS100 code: HD
- Category: 3
- Fare zone: VBN: 710
- Website: www.bahnhof.de

Services
Preceding station	DB Fernverkehr	Following station
Oldenburg Hbf One-way operation	ICE 16	Bremen Hbf towards Berlin Südkreuz
Oldenburg Hbf Terminus	ICE 26	Bremen Hbf towards Karlsruhe Hbf
Hude towards Norddeich Mole	IC 56	Bremen Hbf towards Leipzig Hbf or Cottbus Hbf
Preceding station	DB Regio Nord	Following station
Hude towards Norddeich Mole	RE 1	Bremen Hbf towards Hannover Hbf
Preceding station	NordWestBahn	Following station
Ganderkesee towards Osnabrück Hbf	RB 58	Bremen Neustadt towards Bremen Hbf
Preceding station	Bremen S-Bahn	Following station
Hoykenkamp towards Bad Zwischenahn	RS3	Heidkrug towards Bremen Hbf
Hude towards Bad Zwischenahn	RS30	Bremen Hbf Terminus
Hoykenkamp towards Nordenham	RS4	Heidkrug towards Bremen Hbf
Location

Delmenhorst (German: Bahnhof Delmenhorst) is a railway station located in Delmenhorst, Germany. The station is located on the Oldenburg–Bremen railway and Delmenhorst–Hesepe railway. The train services are operated by Deutsche Bahn and NordWestBahn. The station has been part of the Bremen S-Bahn since December 2010.

== Rail services ==
The following services currently call at the station:

- Intercity services IC 56 Norddeich Mole – Emden – Delmenhorst – Bremen – Hannover – Braunschweig – Magdeburg – Leipzig
- Regional services RE 1 Norddeich – Emden – Oldenburg – Delmenhorst – Bremen – Nienburg Hanover
- Local services RB 58 Osnabrück – Bramsche – Vechta – Delmenhorst – Bremen
- Bremen S-Bahn services RS3 Bad Zwischenahn - Oldenburg – Delmenhorst - Bremen
- Bremen S-Bahn services RS30 Bremen – Delmenhorst – Hude - Oldenburg - Oldenburg-Wechloy - Bad Zwischenahn
- Bremen S-Bahn services RS4 Nordenham – Hude – Delmenhorst – Bremen
