= Rastede station =

Railway station in Rastede, Germany

Rastede
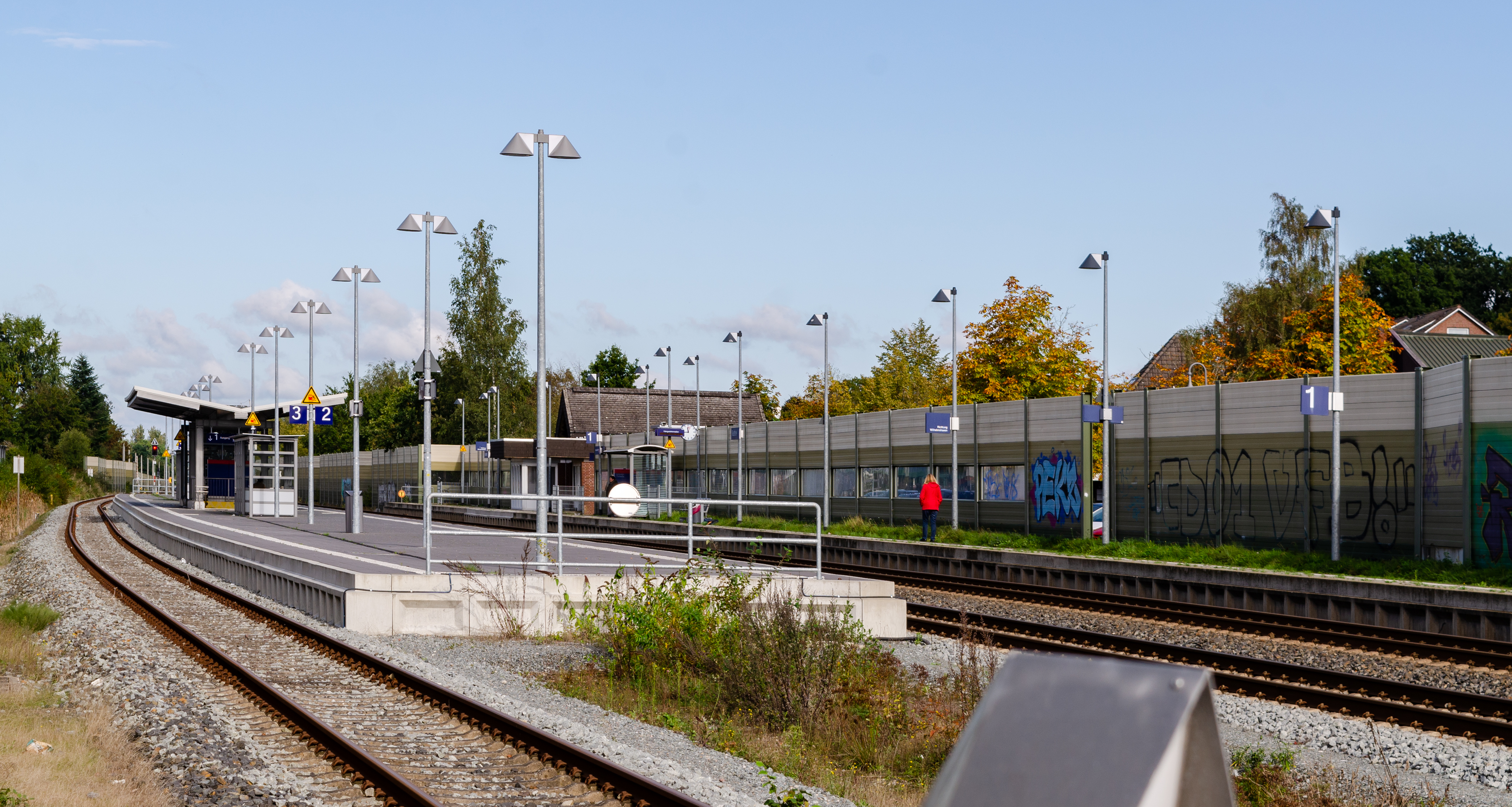
- Platforms of Rastede railway station (2019)

General information
- Location: Rastede, Lower Saxony; Germany
- Coordinates: 53.2444°N 8.1911°E
- Line: Oldenburg–Wilhelmshaven railway
- Platforms: 2
- Tracks: 3

Other information
- Fare zone: VBN: 910

Services
Preceding station	NordWestBahn	Following station
Jaderberg towards Wilhelmshaven	RE 18	Oldenburg Hbf towards Osnabrück Hbf
Jaderberg towards Esens(Ostfriesl)	RB 59 Limited service	Oldenburg Hbf One-way operation
Preceding station	Bremen S-Bahn	Following station
Jaderberg towards Wilhelmshaven	RS3	Oldenburg Hbf towards Bremen Hbf
Location

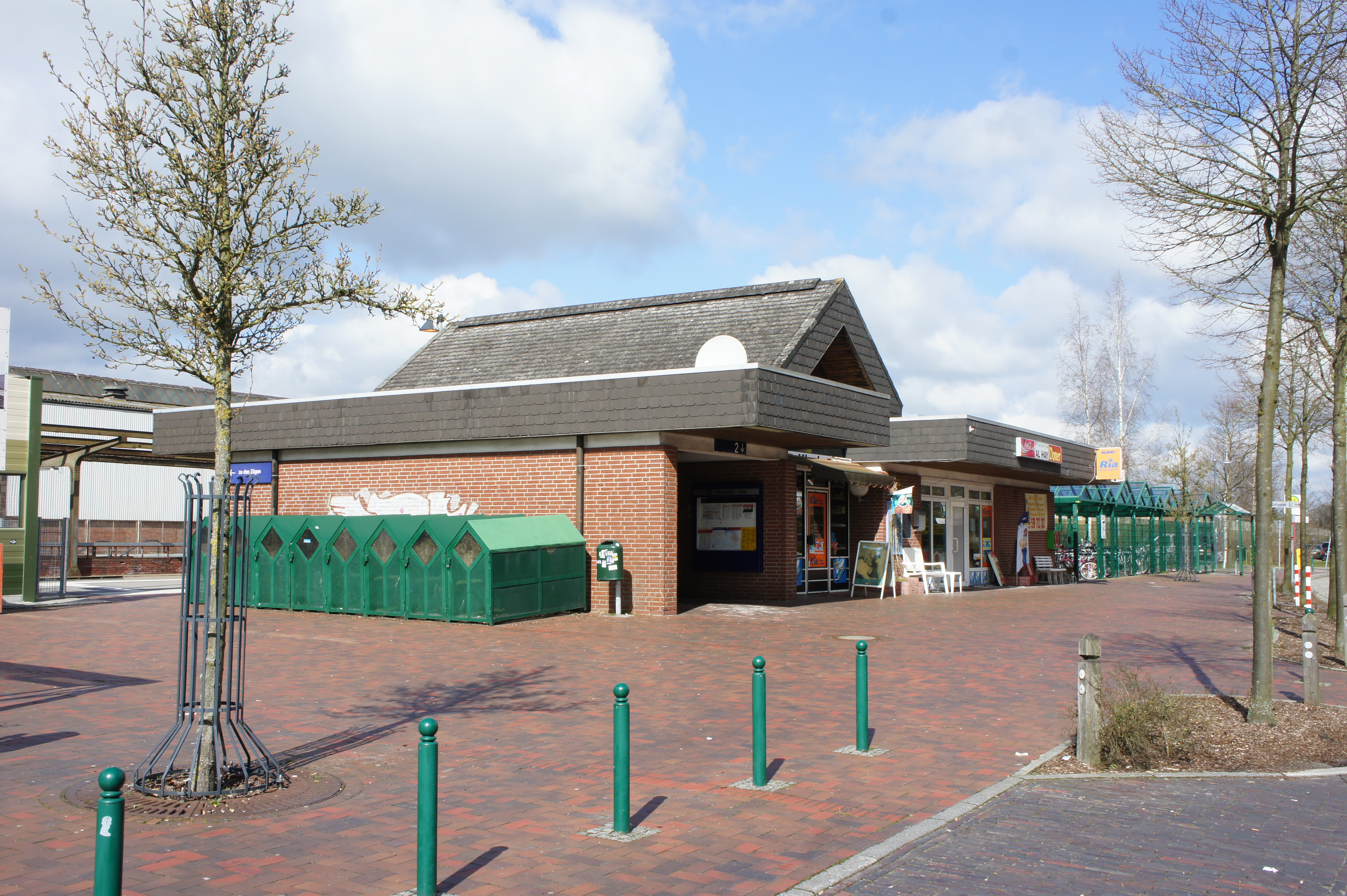
Station building (2015)

Rastede (German: Bahnhof Rastede) is a railway station located in Rastede, Germany. The station is located on the Oldenburg–Wilhelmshaven railway. The train services are operated by NordWestBahn.

== Train services ==
The station is served by the following services:

- Regional services RE 18 Wilhelmshaven - Varel - Oldenburg - Cloppenburg - Bramsche - Osnabrück
- S-Bahn service RS3 Oldenburg (Oldb) Hbf – Rastede – Jaderberg – Varel (Oldb) – Sande – Wilhelmshaven
