= Heidkrug station =

Railway station in Delmenhorst, Germany

Heidkrug
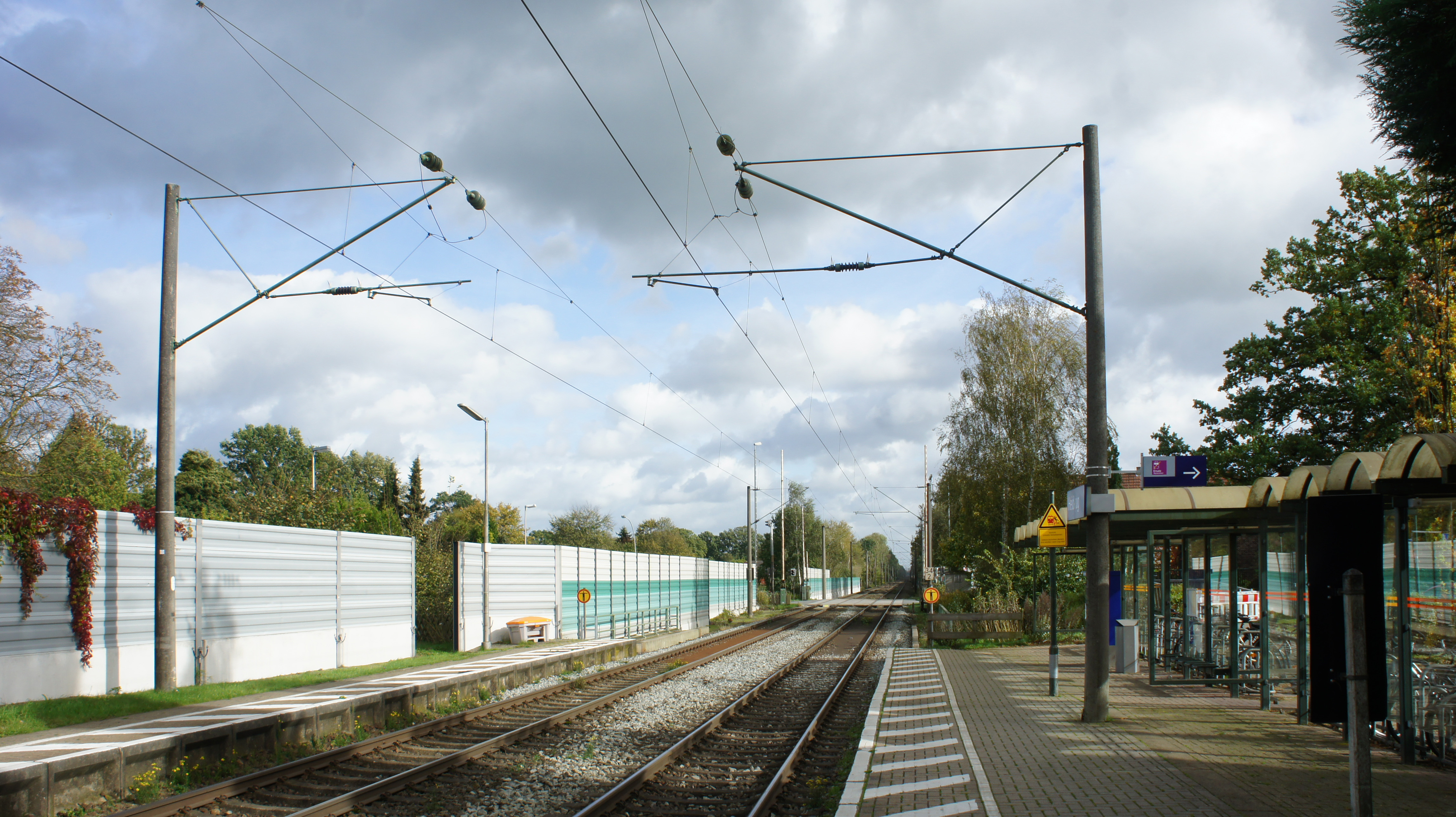
- Heidkrug railway station in 2017

General information
- Location: Delmenhorst, Lower Saxony; Germany
- Coordinates: 53.05706°N 8.67992°E
- Line: Oldenburg–Bremen railway
- Platforms: 2

Other information
- Fare zone: VBN: 709

Services
Preceding station	Bremen S-Bahn	Following station
Delmenhorst towards Bad Zwischenahn	RS3	Bremen Neustadt towards Bremen Hbf
Delmenhorst towards Nordenham	RS4	Bremen Neustadt towards Bremen Hbf
Location

Heidkrug (German: Bahnhof Heidkrug) is a railway station located in Delmenhorst, Germany. The station is located on the Oldenburg–Bremen railway. The train services are operated by NordWestBahn. The station has been part of the Bremen S-Bahn since December 2010.

== Train services ==
The following services currently call at the station:

- Bremen S-Bahn services RS3 Bad Zwischenahn - Oldenburg - Delmenhorst - Bremen
