= Bremen Neustadt station =

Railway station in Bremen, Germany

Bremen Neustadt
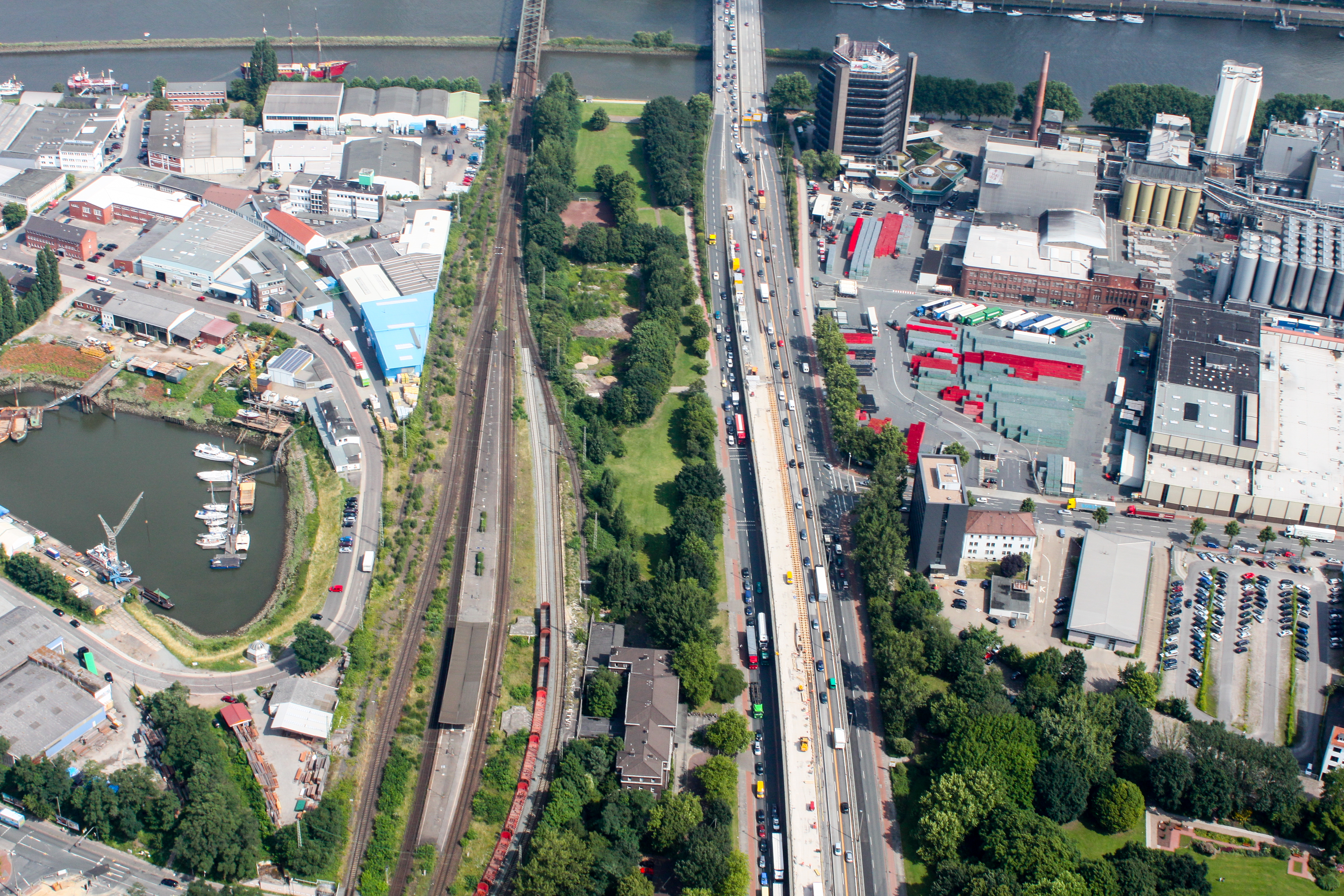
- 2012

General information
- Location: Bremen, Free Hanseatic City of Bremen; Germany
- Coordinates: 53.07588°N 8.7858°E
- Line: Oldenburg–Bremen railway
- Platforms: 2

Other information
- Fare zone: VBN: 100

Services
| Preceding station | NordWestBahn | Following station |
|---|---|---|
| Delmenhorst towards Osnabrück Hbf | RB 58 | Bremen Hbf Terminus |
| Preceding station | Bremen S-Bahn | Following station |
| Heidkrug towards Bad Zwischenahn | RS3 | Bremen Hbf Terminus |
| Heidkrug towards Nordenham | RS4 | Bremen Hbf Terminus |
Location

Bremen Neustadt (German: Bahnhof Bremen Neustadt) is a railway station located in Bremen, Germany. The station is located on the Oldenburg–Bremen railway. The train services are operated by NordWestBahn. The station has been part of the Bremen S-Bahn since December 2010.

== Train services ==
The following services currently call at the station:

- Local services RB 58 Osnabrück - Bramsche - Vechta - Delmenhorst - Bremen
- Bremen S-Bahn services RS3 Bad Zwischenahn - Oldenburg - Delmenhorst - Bremen
