= Hoykenkamp station =

Railway station in Hoykenkamp, German

Hoykenkamp
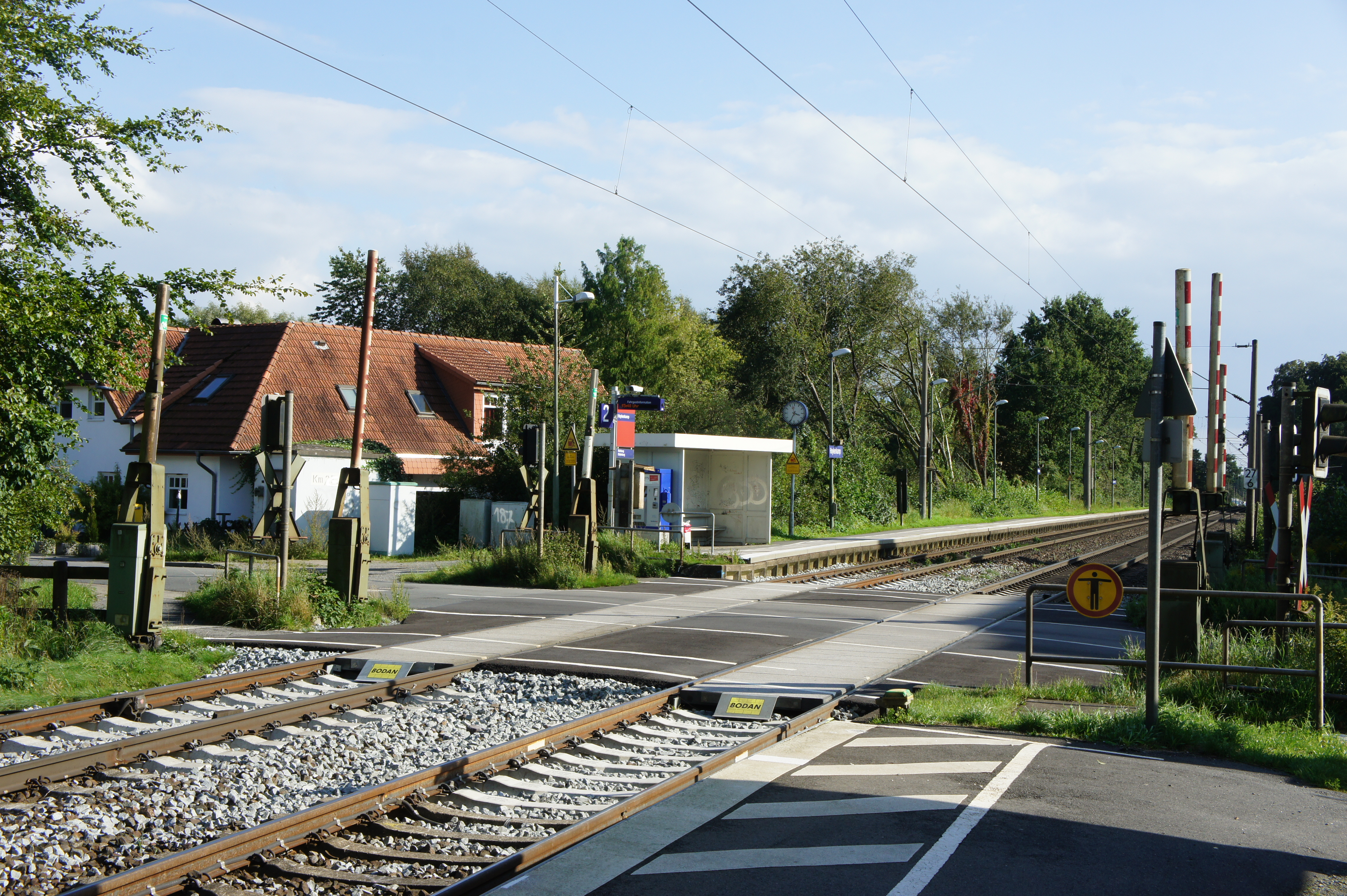
- Hoykenkamp railway station in 2015

General information
- Location: Hoykenkamp, Lower Saxony; Germany
- Coordinates: 53.06977°N 8.59873°E
- Line: Oldenburg–Bremen railway
- Platforms: 2

Other information
- Fare zone: VBN: 710 and 720

Services
Preceding station	Bremen S-Bahn	Following station
Schierbrok towards Bad Zwischenahn	RS3	Delmenhorst towards Bremen Hbf
Schierbrok towards Nordenham	RS4	Delmenhorst towards Bremen Hbf
Location

Hoykenkamp (German: Bahnhof Hoykenkamp) is a railway station located in Hoykenkamp, Germany. The station is located on the Oldenburg–Bremen railway. The train services are operated by NordWestBahn. The station has been part of the Bremen S-Bahn since December 2010.

== Train services ==
The following services currently call at the station:

- Bremen S-Bahn services RS3 Bad Zwischenahn - Oldenburg - Delmenhorst - Bremen
