= Sandkrug station =

Railway station in Hatten, Germany

Sandkrug
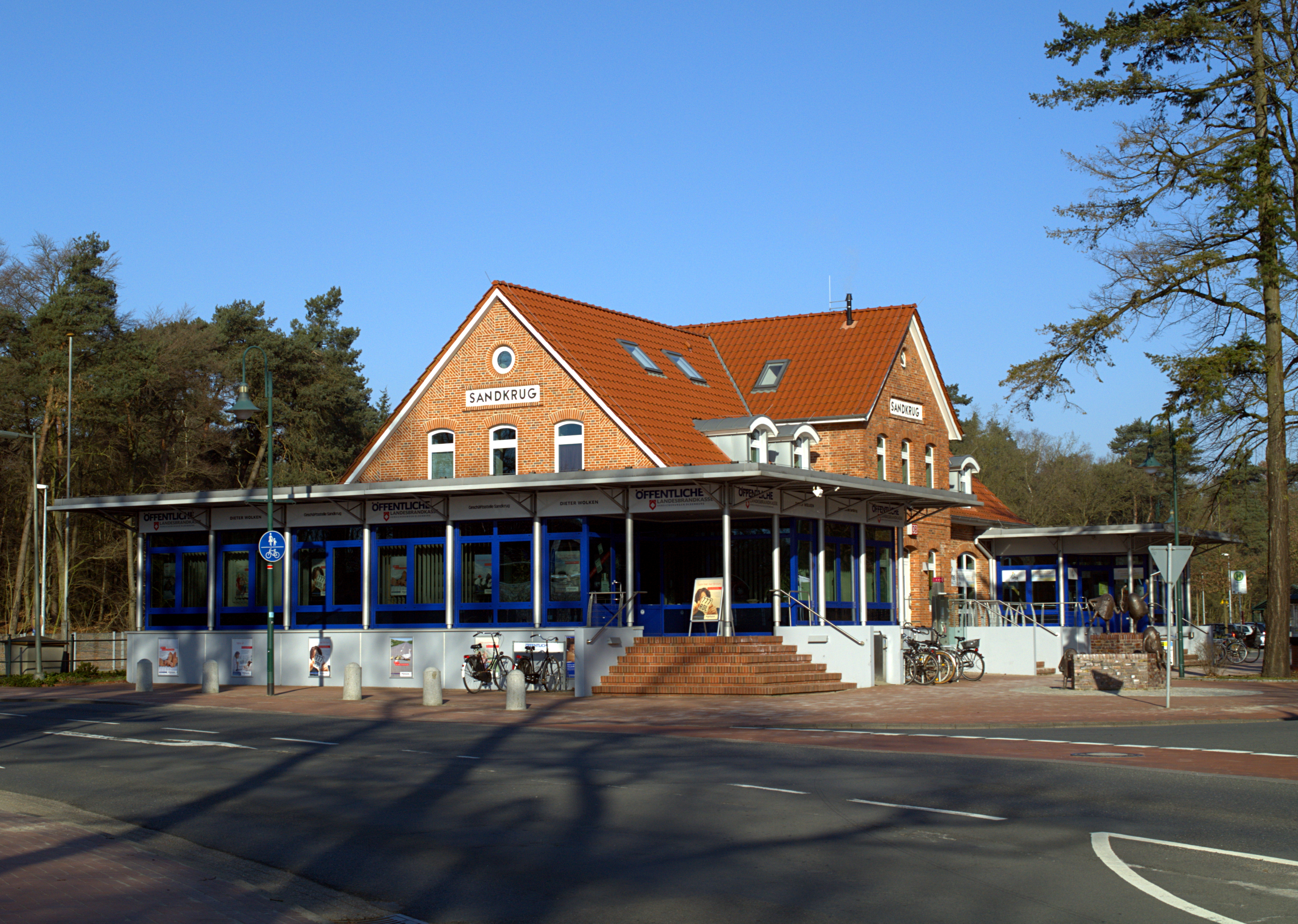
- 2011

General information
- Location: Bahnhofstraße 1; 26209 Sandkrug; Lower Saxony; Germany
- Coordinates: 53.055°N 8.255°E
- System: Bf
- Owner: Deutsche Bahn
- Operator: DB Station&Service
- Lines: Oldenburg–Osnabrück railway (KBS 392)
- Platforms: 2 side platforms
- Tracks: 2
- Train operators: NordWestBahn
- Connections: RE 18; 277 278 279 282 288 315 315E 325 N41

Construction
- Parking: yes
- Cycle facilities: yes

Other information
- Station code: 5502
- DS100 code: HSAK
- IBNR: 8005287
- Category: 6
- Fare zone: VBN: 920
- Website: www.bahnhof.de

Services
Preceding station	NordWestBahn	Following station
Oldenburg Hbf towards Wilhelmshaven	RE 18	Huntlosen towards Osnabrück Hbf
Oldenburg Hbf towards Esens	RB 59 Limited service	Huntlosen towards Osnabrück Hbf
Location
- Location within Lower Saxony Location within Germany Location within Europe

Sandkrug station (German: Bahnhof Sandkrug) is a railway station in the municipality of Sandkrug, located in the Oldenburg district in Lower Saxony, Germany.

== Services ==
Line	Route	Interval	Operator	Rolling stock
RE 18	Wilhelmshaven – Oldenburg – Cloppenburg – Quakenbrück – Sandkrug – Osnabrück Altstadt – Osnabrück	60 min	NordWestBahn	Lint 41
RB 59	Esens – Oldenburg – Cloppenburg – Quakenbrück – Sandkrug – Osnabrück Altstadt – Osnabrück	1 train Sa	NordWestBahn	Lint 41
