= Wilhelmshaven–Oldenburg railway =

Railway line in Germany

Oldenburg–Wilhelmshaven
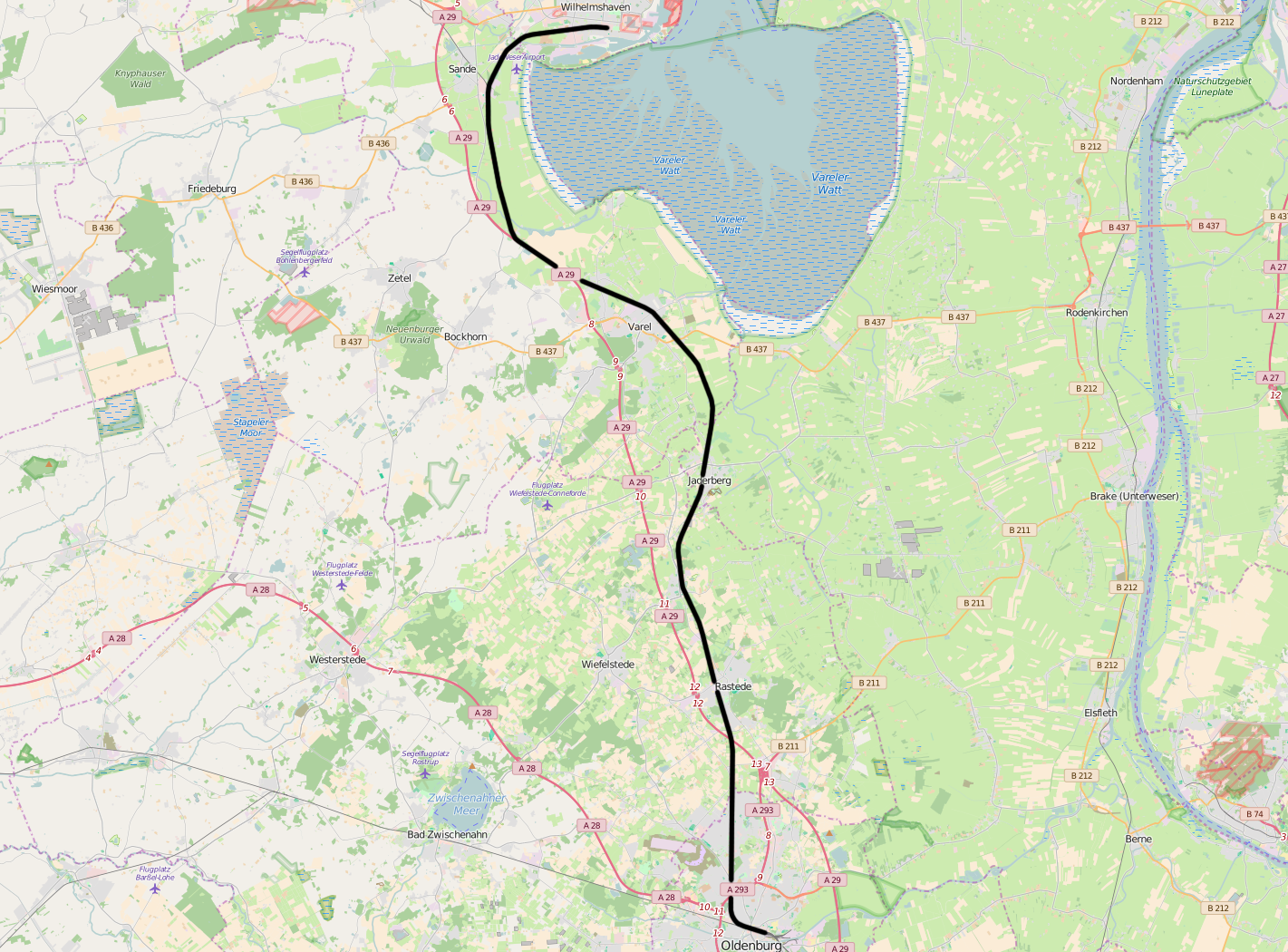

Overview
- Line number: 1522
- Locale: Lower Saxony

Service
- Route number: 392

Technical
- Line length: 52.4 km (32.6 mi)
- Number of tracks: 2
- Track gauge: 1,435 mm (4 ft 8 1/2 in) standard gauge
- Electrification: 15 kV/16.7 Hz AC overhead catenary
- Operating speed: 120 km/h (74.6 mph) (maximum)

The Wilhelmshaven–Oldenburg railway is a predominantly double-track, electrified main line in the northwest in the German state of Lower Saxony. It runs to the south from the port city of Wilhelmshaven to Oldenburg.

== History ==
The track was a joint project of the Grand Duchy of Oldenburg State Railways and the Prussian state railways and was built together with the Oldenburg–Bremen line. It linked the Prussian naval base in Wilhelmshaven (then called Heppens) and opened up the north of the Grand Duchy. It was officially opened on 18 July 1867, but scheduled services started on 3 September 1867.

The responsibility for the route was taken over in 1920 by the Reichsbahndirektion (Deutsche Reichsbahn railway division) of Oldenburg on 1 April 1920 when the Oldenburg State Railways were absorbed into Deutsche Reichsbahn.

=== Upgrade for the JadeWeserPort ===
The electrification and duplication of the whole route was classified in the 2003 Federal Transport Routes Plan (Bundesverkehrswegeplan 2003) in the "Priority Needs" category, the highest priority level. In August 2006 the Chairman of the Deutsche Bahn AG, Hartmut Mehdorn, gave a commitment to the then Prime Minister of Lower Saxony, Christian Wulff to electrify and duplicate the entire route by 2010. The estimated costs were estimated at €22m at the time.

In November 2008, the upgrade was included in the federal government's "Workplace Program for Construction and Transport" (Arbeitsplatzprogramm Bauen und Verkehr). The route between Rastede and Wilhelmshaven was closed to train traffic from the beginning of August 2011 until the timetable change in December 2012 due to work to build a second track as part of the construction of the JadeWeserPort. During this period, only rail replacement buses operated between Rastede and Wilhelmshaven, which were provided by the VWG Oldenburg (a company mostly only by the city of Oldenburg) as a partner of the NordWestBahn. Before the start of the implementation, the costs for the upgrade was estimated at €120m. In contrast to the original estimates from 2006, electrification was no longer included in this total.

While the duplication of the track and the upgrade for a maximum speed of 100 km/h was implemented by the end of 2012, the electrification of the line was initially postponed. Regardless of the long planning period and the fact that the route was already double-tracked before the Second World War, the ground conditions presented the railway with considerable problems. When the timetable changed in December 2014, the maximum speed on the Rastede – Varel (Oldb) section was increased to 120 km/h.

A 10.6-kilometer section of the line between Sande and Varel was renovated between April 2017 and March 2020, with line closures only taking place at weekends. The permissible axle load was increased from 22.5 to 23.5 t and the maximum speed to 120 km/h. The work was finished four weeks ahead of schedule and cost around €100m.

The consultation process for electrification ran until 22 December 2015, the costs of which are not included in the further increased construction budget. After the construction delays, the electrification of the line was completed by October 2022 and was expected to cost around €423m. The cost of the overall project between Oldenburg and Wilhelmshaven was estimated at the beginning of 2020 at €1.1 billion.

The start of operations at the JadeWeserPort in September 2012 was expected to significantly increase the volume of freight trains. The planning provided for an increase from eight to 44 to 60 trains. So far (as of 2019), traffic is much less than forecast due to the underutilisation of the port.

=== Further work ===
A station was restored in Jaderberg for passenger services. The plan to build two 55-centimetre-high platforms was approved by the Federal Railway Authority (Eisenbahn-Bundesamt) on 29 November 2018. Construction began in May 2019. After problems with the project design, the new stop was included in the timetable on 14 June 2020.

In addition, between August 2019 and June 2021, Sande station was converted for the new train operations and upgraded to modern standards. In the course of the construction work, the Deichstraße level crossing in Sande was eliminated. A foot and cycle path tunnel was under construction in 2022.

== Route ==
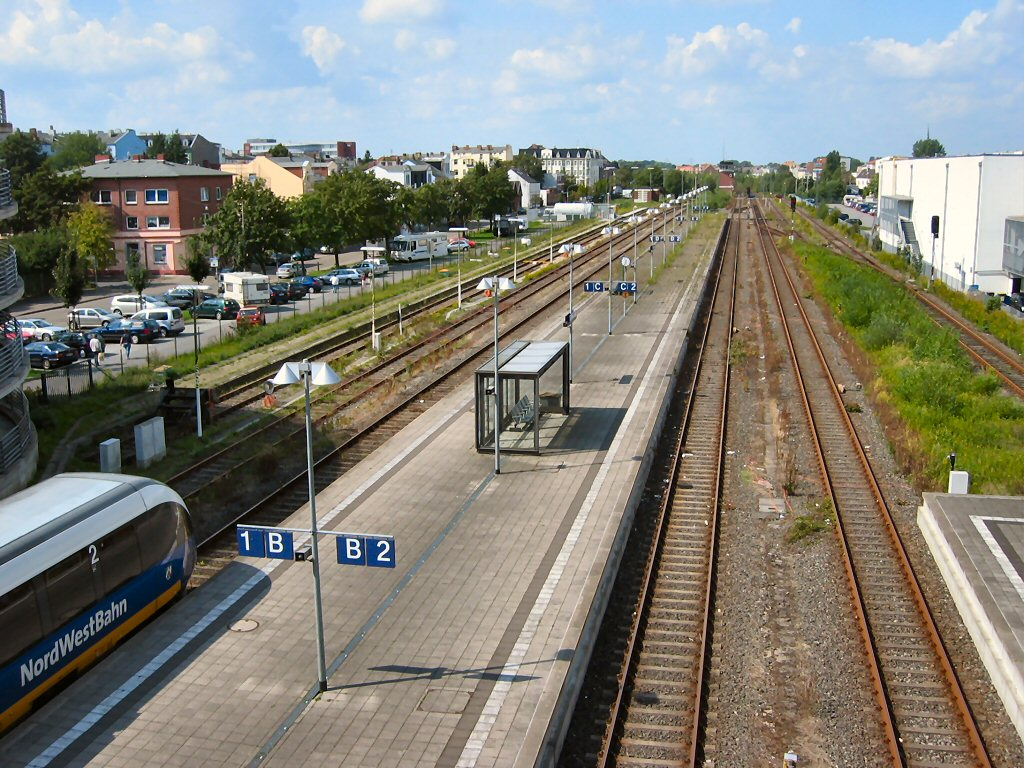
View over Wilhelmshaven station

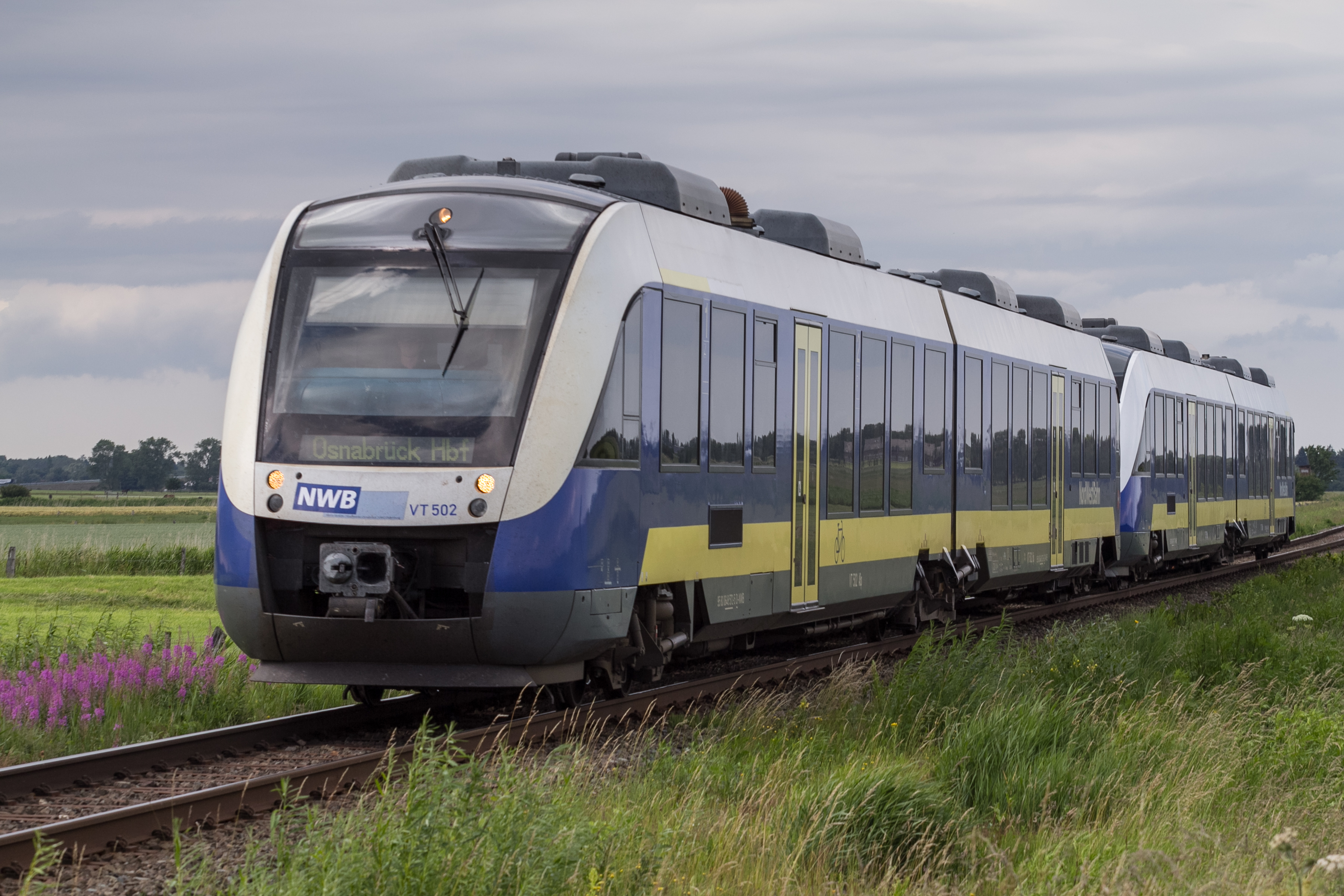
Local train in 2011

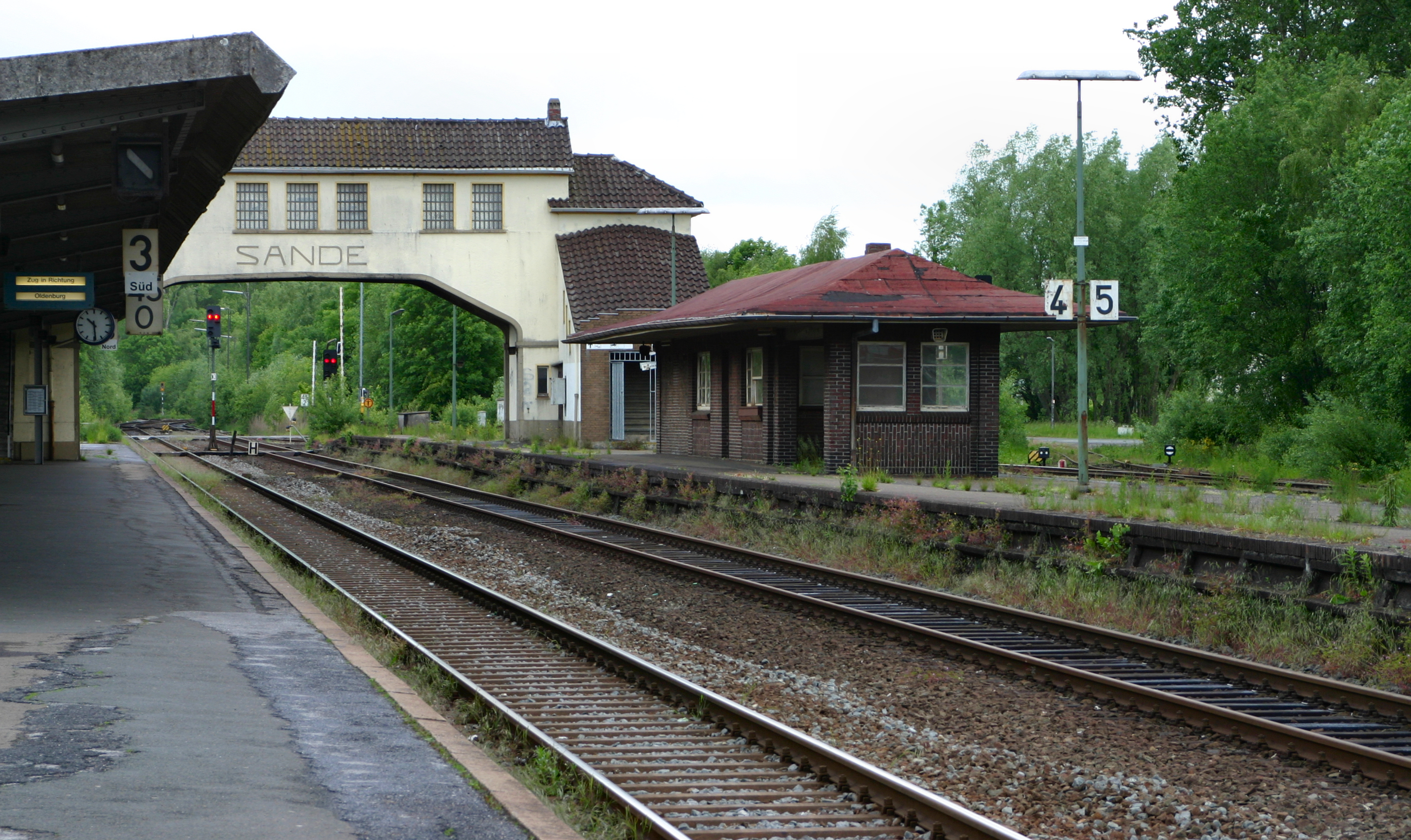
Sande station

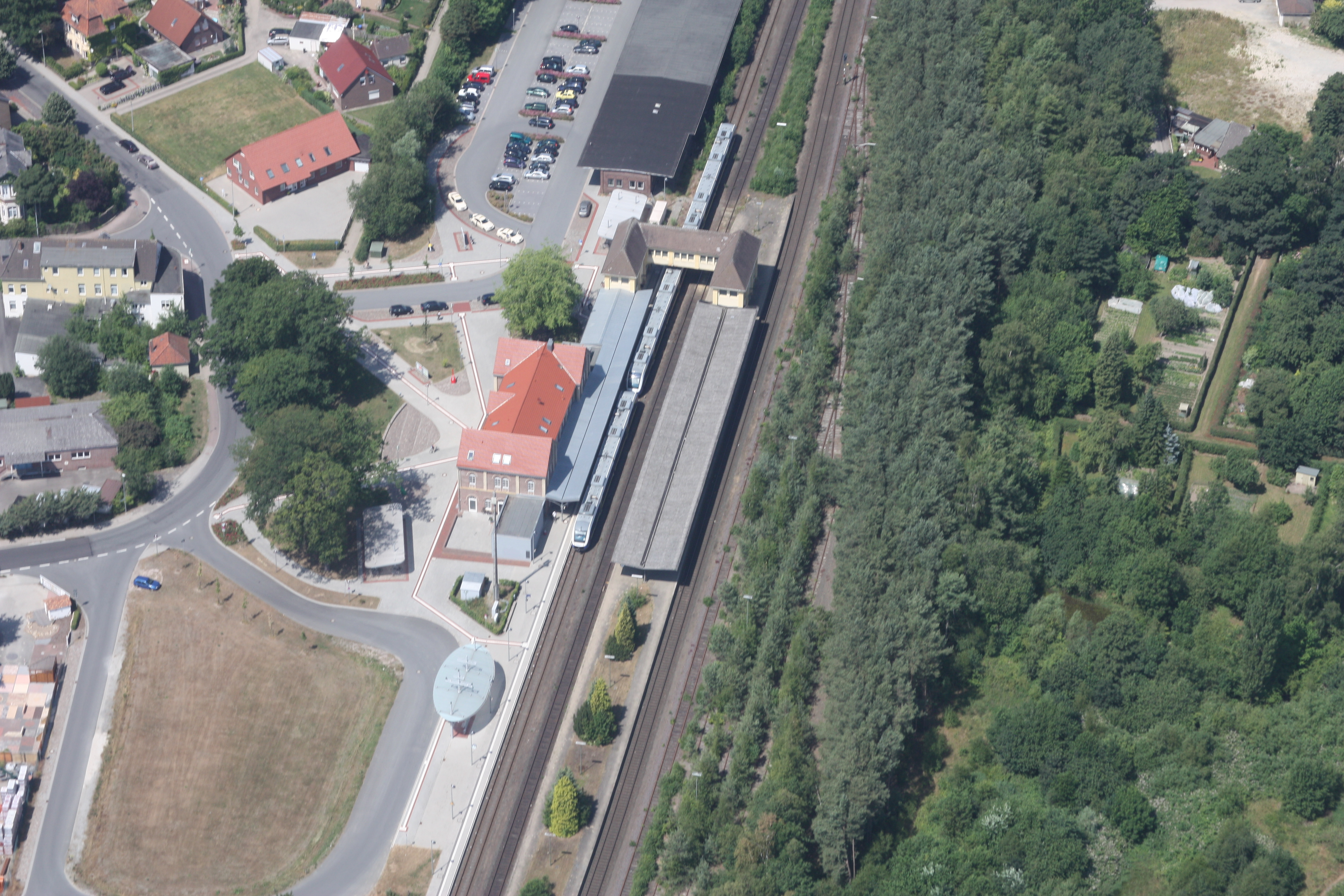
Varel station

The Oldenburg–Wilhelmshaven line (VzG 1522) has been fully double track since 2014 and has been designed for a maximum speed of up to 120 km/h since December 2014. The points and signals between Oldenburg and Wilhelmshaven are remotely controlled from Hanover electronic signalling control centre. Oldenburg station continues to be served by dispatchers on site.

== Operations ==
The line experienced its heyday during the time of Deutsche Reichsbahn. In 1938–1939, as a result of Wilhelmshaven's status as a navy base, the line was served, along with other services, by a high-speed diesel multiple unit (Schnellverkehrs-Triebwagen, abbreviated SVT) service called the SVT Hamburg, which ran each day from Wilhelmshaven to Berlin Lehrter Bahnhof and back via Oldenburg, Bremen, Langwedel, Uelzen, Salzwedel and Stendal. In the 1950s to the 1970s, there was a long-distance express train to Basel SBB and/or Zürich (sometimes continuing to Chur), as well as Frankfurt. There were also special long-distance trains at the weekend for conscripts returning home.

Individual coaches also ran through to the Berlin Stadtbahn, Munich and Stuttgart. There were also, seasonal, so-called guest worker trains from Yugoslavia and Greece to Wilhelmshaven and vice versa. During the annual Hanover Fair a service called the Messe-Kapitän ran daily on the line to Hannover-Messe station; it originally only had first class accommodation, but second class was added later. In the 1970s, the long-distance passenger traffic gradually lost its importance. The long-distance trains terminated at Lindau, Munich, Stuttgart and Frankfurt. Before the introduction of Interregio services, City-D-Zug (connecting trains to the main long-distance express network) services operated. So four pairs of trains ran daily between Wilhelmshaven and Bremen to connect to the long-distance network in Bremen. An apparent prosperity followed with the introduction of Interregio services. Berlin, Cottbus and Leipzig were connected directly to/from Wilhelmshaven, achieving modern levels of comfort. Until about the mid-1990s there was also a daily pair of express trains on the (Koblenz –) Cologne – Wilhelmshaven route and an express train (primarily for weekend visit by the family of military personnel) offered exclusively second class travel from Mönchengladbach to Wilhelmshaven.

Deutsche Bahn used class 624 diesel railcars until 2000 and class 218 diesel locomotives for the InterRegio until 2002.

=== Since 2000 ===
The operation of the regional traffic between Osnabrück and Wilhelmshaven was awarded together with two other lines as part of the "Weser-Ems" network, which was the first network that the Landesnahverkehrsgesellschaft Niedersachsen (LNVG, "regional transport company of Lower Saxony") put out to tender. The contract was awarded to NordWestBahn, which began operating LINT diesel multiple units from the LNVG vehicle pool on 5 November 2000. The journey time between Oldenburg and Wilhelmshaven was reduced from 55 to 65 minutes previously operated by Deutsche Bahn to the current 46 minutes. By shortening stops and upgrading the infrastructure further along the line, the travel time between Wilhelmshaven and Osnabrück could be reduced be reduced to 45 minutes. In Oldenburg there is an optimal hub with the RE/IC trains on the Bremen–Emden route. In Sande there is a short connection to the trains towards Esens on the opposite platform.

Deutsche Bahn's Interregio line was discontinued in December 2002. After that, a few pairs of local trains were introduced between Wilhelmshaven and Bremen.

At the beginning of 2005, the LNVG extended the transport contract for the Weser-Ems network by twelve years. Due to the improved supply, demand has doubled between 2000 and 2008. On average, 11,800 people used the train service on the Osnabrück–Wilhelmshaven route every day in 2009.

The route is served hourly by Lint 41 diesel multiple units, which run in coupled sets depending on the volume of traffic. They have a relatively high average speed of 73 km/h. Due to this and its function of connecting the three regional centres of Osnabrück, Oldenburg and Wilhelmshaven, the connection is managed by the LNVG as an express line with the designation of "RE 18".

There are connections to long-distance trains (ICE/IC) and regional trains in Oldenburg, Bremen and Osnabrück.

Since February 2003, the LNVG has contracted regional trains from NordWestBahn for these connections, the journey times of which are comparable to those of the former long-distance trains. The transfer times to the RE and IC between Hanover and Norddeich Mole or Emden are around 10 minutes, but over 40 minutes to the RS 3 of the Bremen S-Bahn.

Since 11 December 2022, line RS 3 has been operating instead of RE 19, which was also operated by NordWestBahn and ran every four hours on week days between Wilhelmshaven and Bremen. Its two train pairs on the weekend were cancelled without replacement.

In freight traffic, the line is mainly served by container trains to or from JadeWeserPort, but there are also coal shipments from the Wilhelmshaven Bulk Terminal and mineral oil shipments from the tank farms on the site of the former Wilhelmshaven refinery.

=== Future traffic ===
After completion of the electrification, the RE 1 line, which runs every two hours between Hanover and Norddeich Mole, was originally supposed to be split in Oldenburg from December 2022 with part of the train continuing to Wilhelmshaven. The RE 18 line from Osnabrück would then end in Oldenburg every two hours. Since there were delays in tendering the trains required for this, this change is now planned to start December 2024. Furthermore, there would be additional regional trains from/to Bremen as part of the Bremen S-Bahn running as RS3 during the peaks from December 2023; these have been running every two to three hours since December 2022.

== Fares ==
The trains can be used under an agreement between Deutsche Bahn and NordWestBahn with tickets available nationwide. Between Rastede and Oldenburg Central Station fares are set by the Verkehrsverbund Bremen/Niedersachsen (Transport Association of Bremen/Lower Saxony). Tickets for local transport can be purchased from machines at the train stations. The machines that used to be on the trains were initially switched off in 2018 and have since been expanded. The DB customer center in the Wilhelmshaven station area was taken over by NordWestBahn in 2016 and closed when the timetable changed in December 2021.
