= JadeWeserPort =

Container terminal in Wilhelmshaven, Germany

Coordinates: 53°35′40″N 8°08′36″E

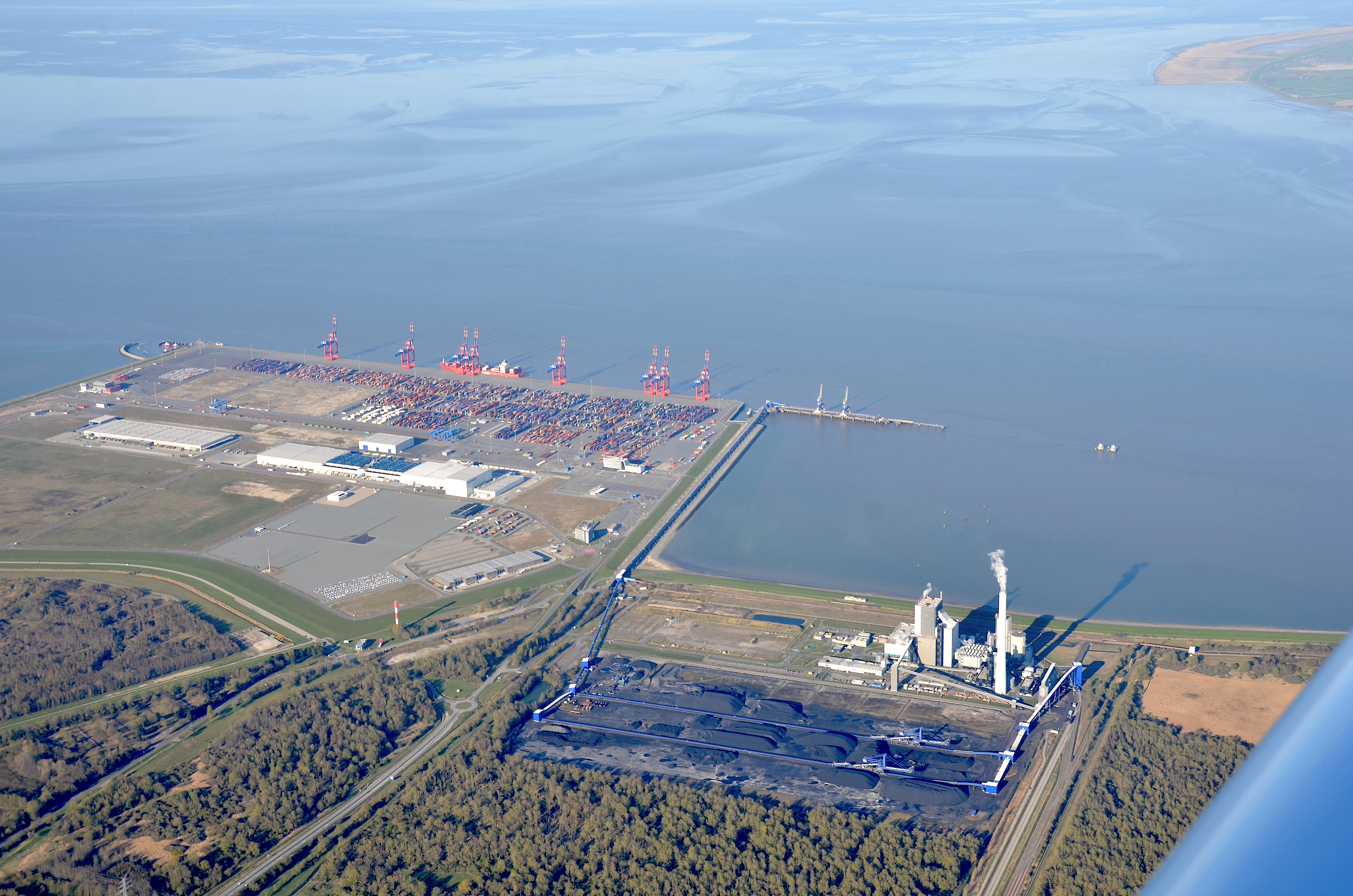
JadeWeserPort (2022) and Coal Power Station Wilhelmshaven (Onyx)

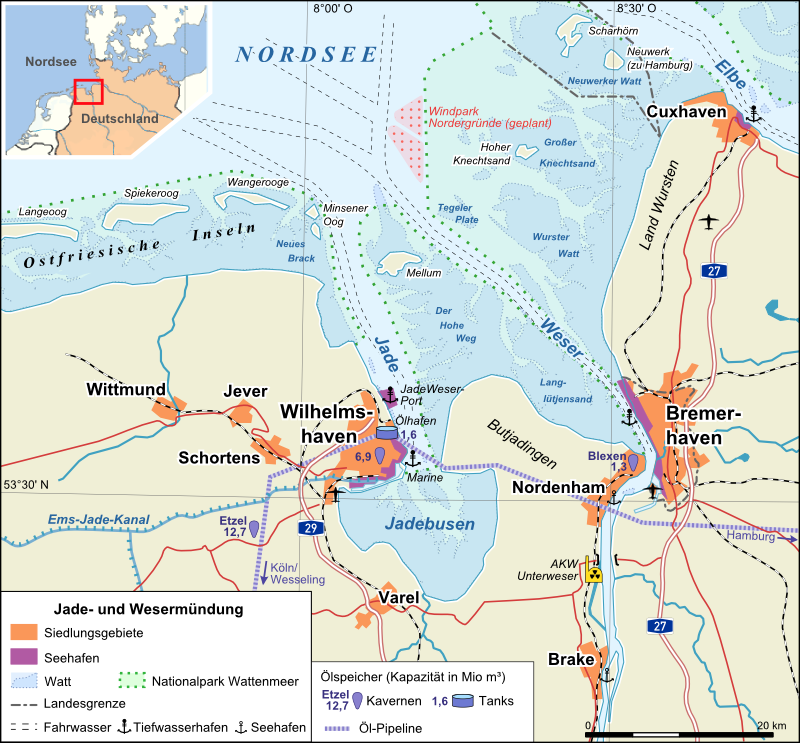
Location of the JadeWeserPort immediately north of Wilhelmshaven.

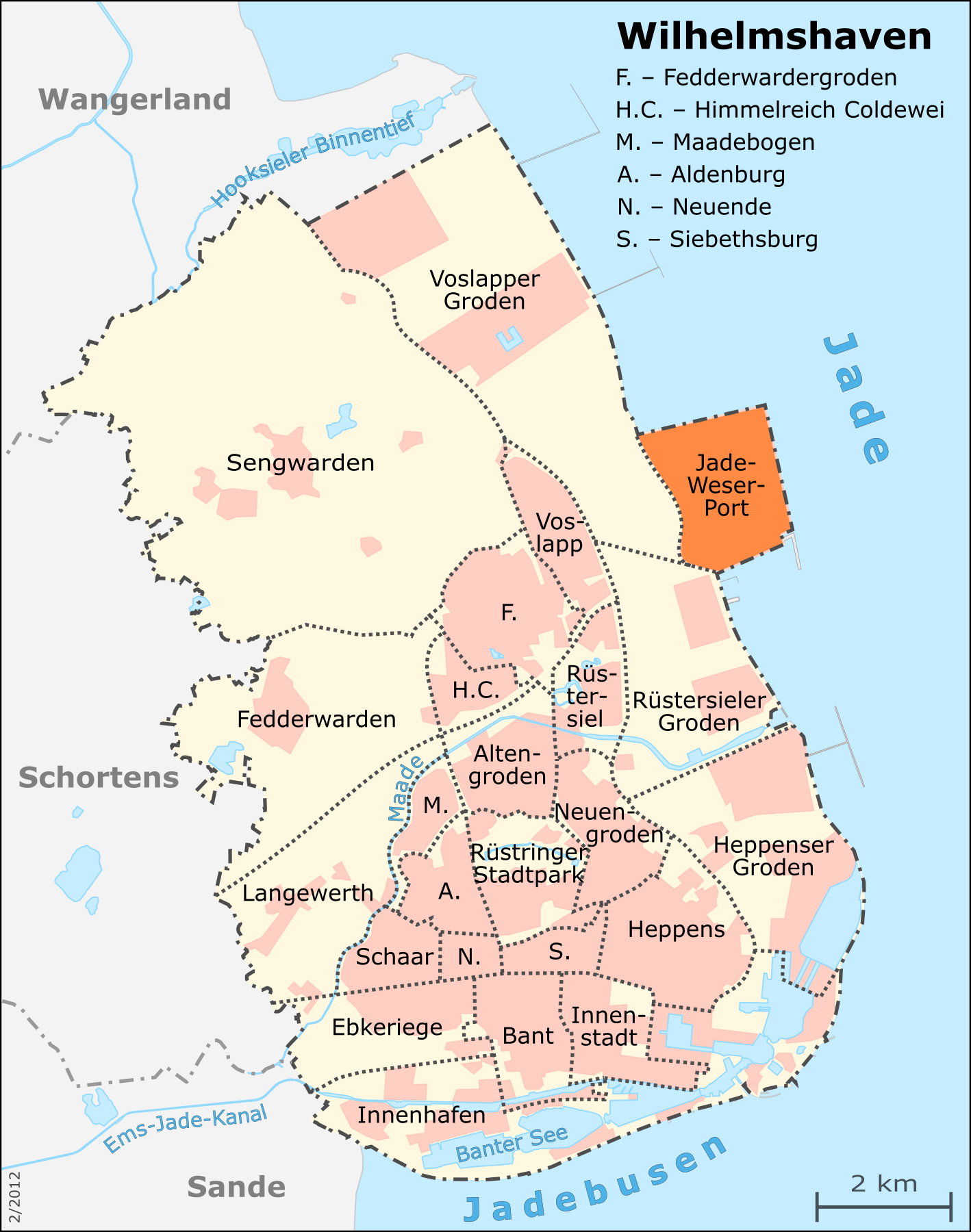
JadeWeserPort on a more detailed map.

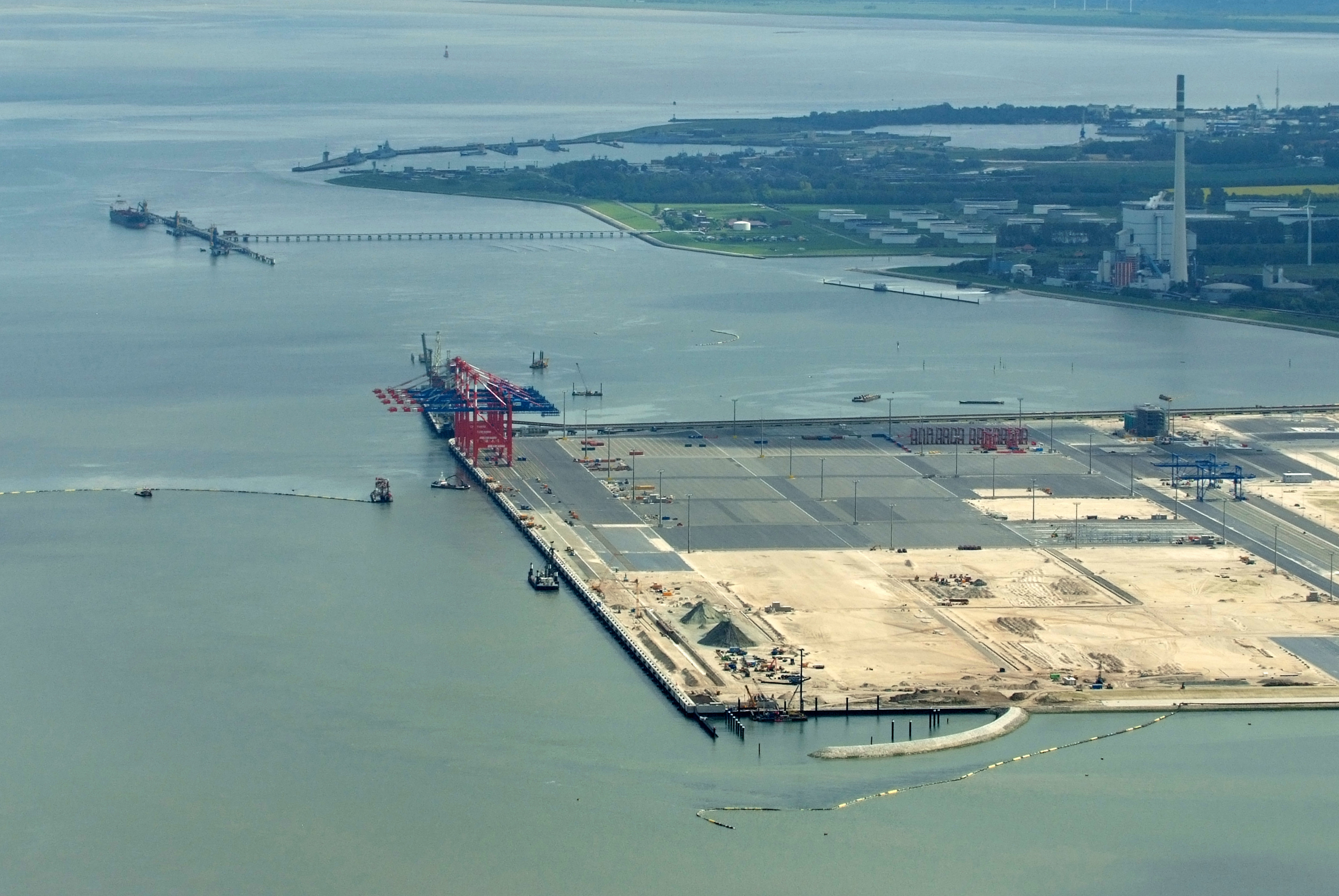
Aerial view of the JadeWeserPort construction site, May 2012

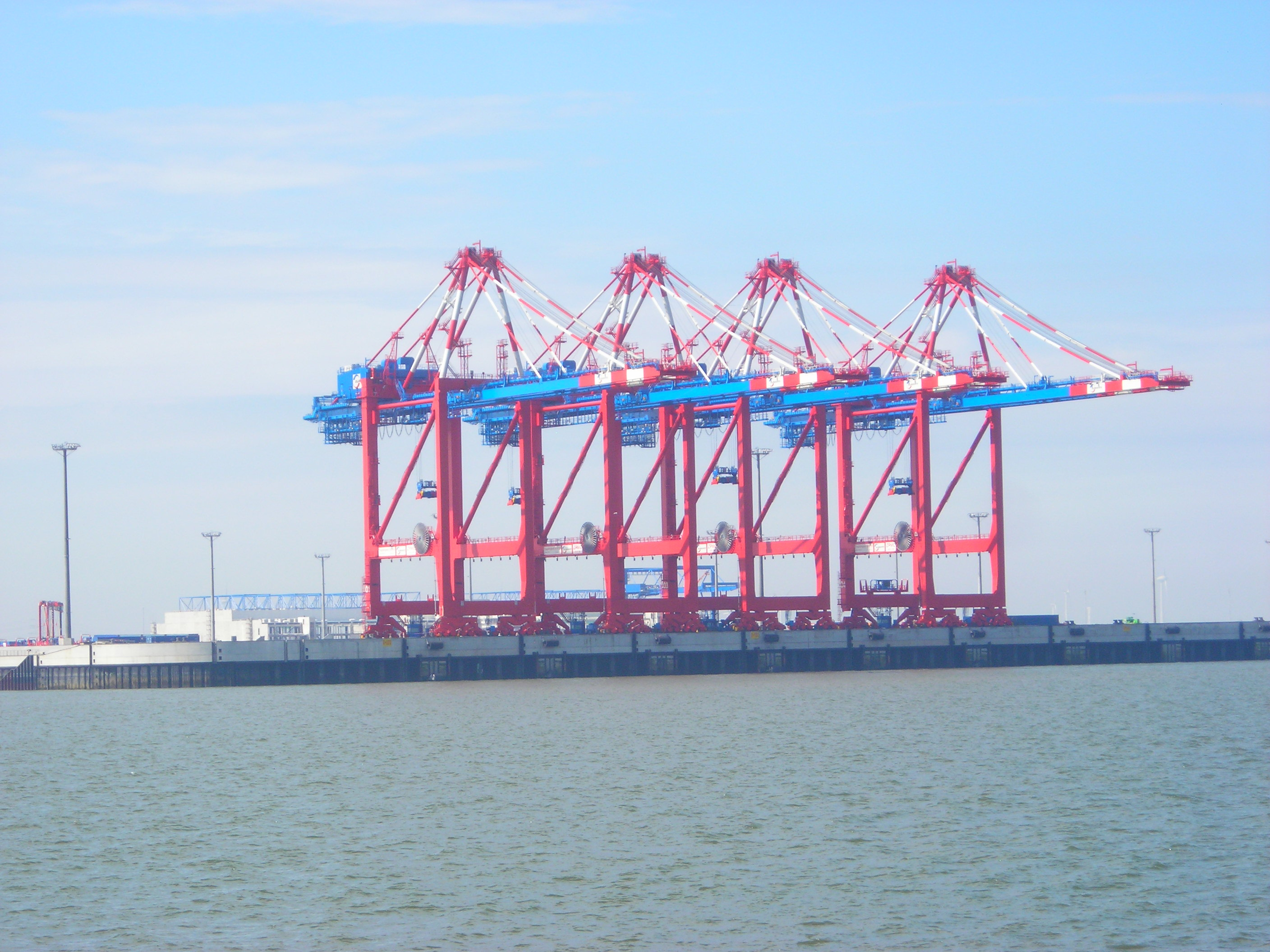
JWP container cranes

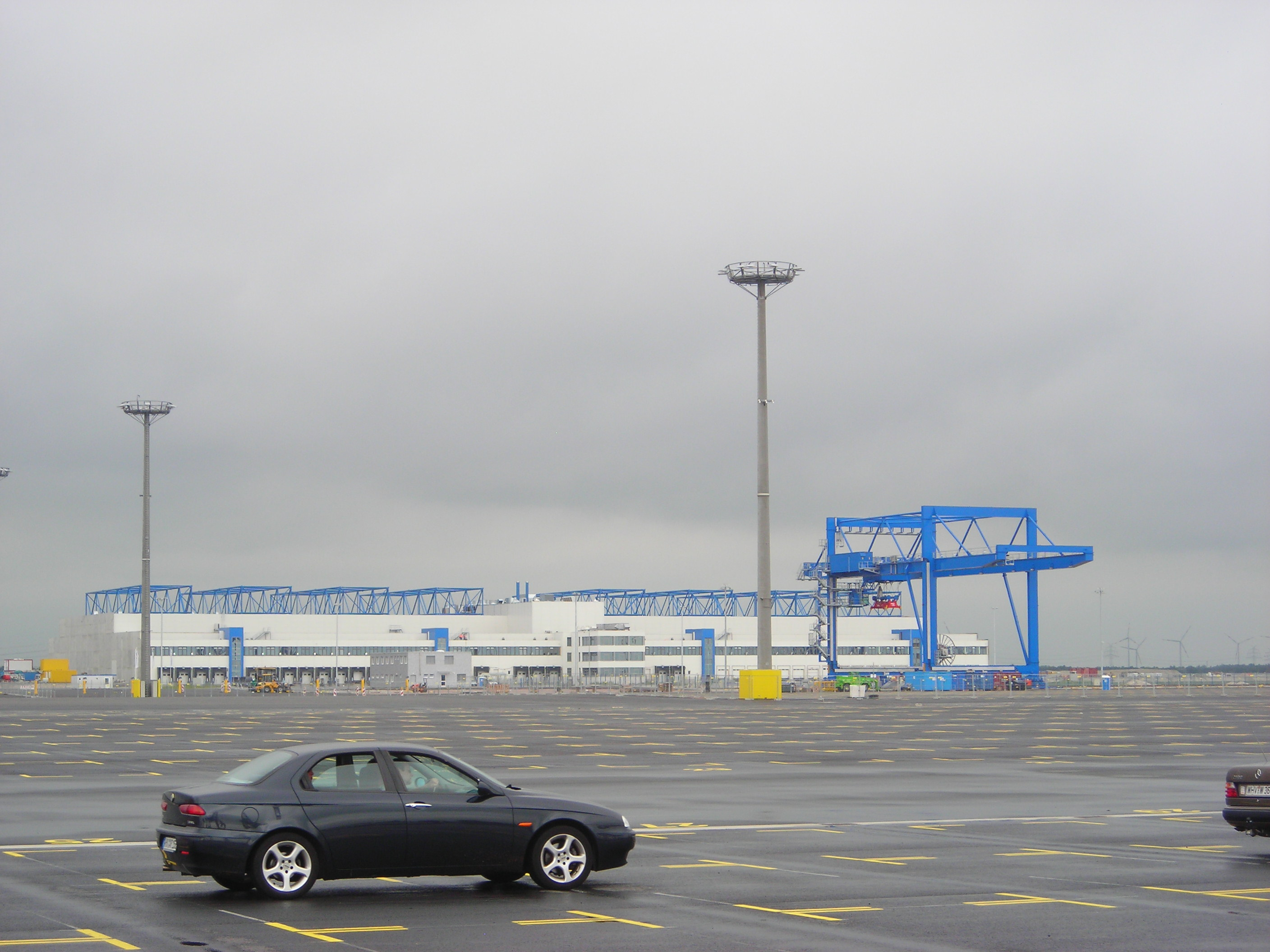
The Nordfrost terminal building. The crane in front of the building is one of five cranes of the goods station

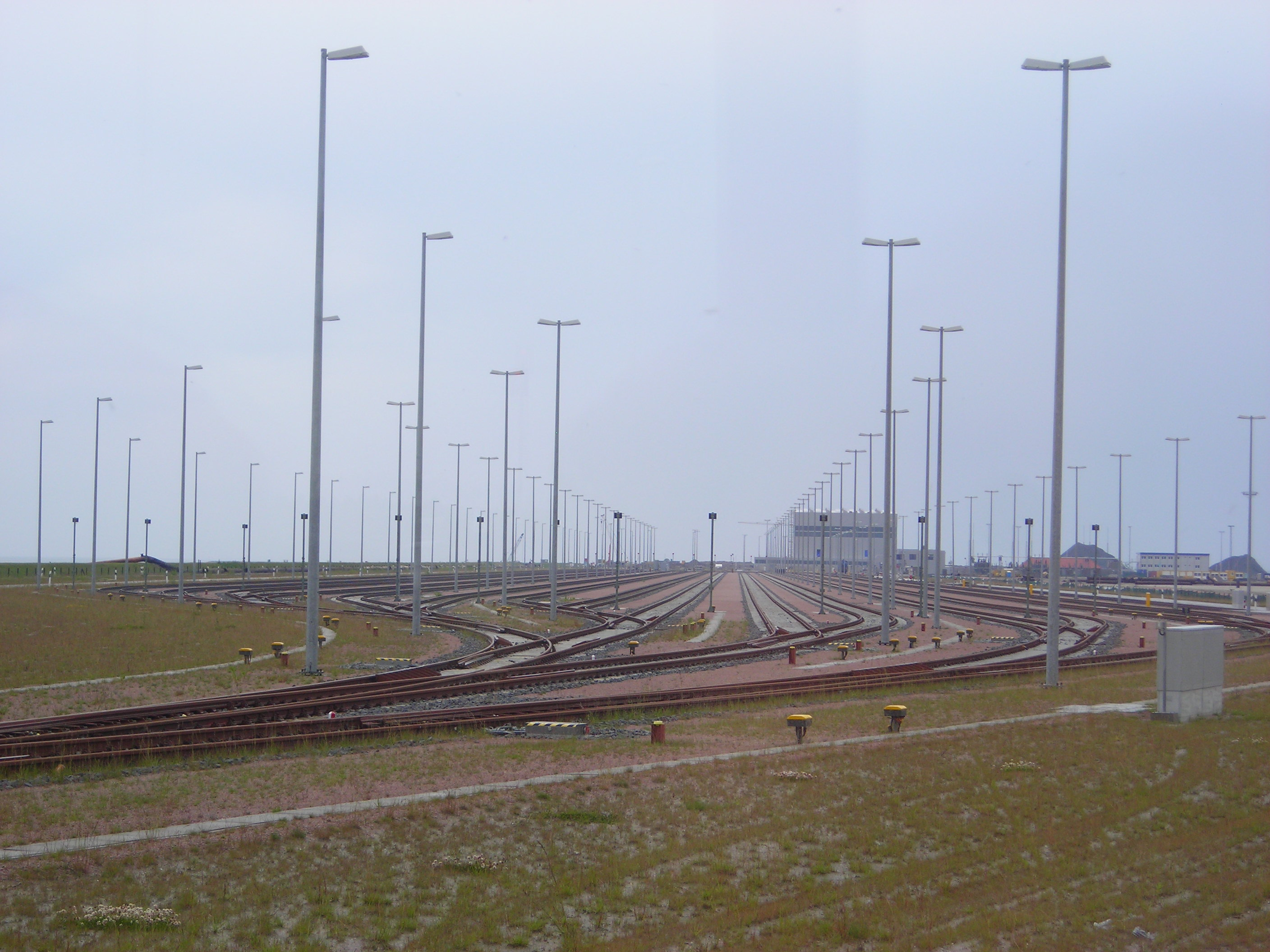
JWP marshalling yard

JadeWeserPort (German pronunciation: [jaːdə veːzɐ pɔɐ̯t]) is Germany's largest harbour project. It is supported by the states of Lower Saxony (50.1% stake) and Bremen (49.9% stake). This new container port is located at Wilhelmshaven at the Jade Bight, a bay on the North Sea coast. It has a natural water depth in excess of 18 m. Container ships with a length of 430 metres (1,410 ft) and 16.5 metres (54 ft) draught are able to call the JadeWeserPort at any tide. Construction work was begun in March 2008. The port was opened on 21 September 2012. However, due to the Great Recession, the port was not given the warmest of welcomes, and very little TEU traffic flowed through the brand-new harbour. But the container handling could be raised from 60,000 in 2014 to 712,953 twenty-foot equivalent unit in 2021. The yearly capacity of the port is 2,700,000 TEU.

== History and construction period ==
There have been plans for expanding the commercial operations of the harbours of Wilhelmshaven for many years. Originally a naval base, the deep water of the Jade estuary became more and more attractive for merchant shipping with the growth of ships in the 20th century. In 1958 the first pier for deep-draft tankers was built. In 1993, local commercial associations made first plans for a major container terminal with initially four, later six, berths for large container vessels.

After a number of delays caused by legal and administrative reasons a court ruling of 8 March 2008 allowed for the immediate commencement of construction work for the first four berths. Between then and January 2012 nearly 46 Mm^{3} of sand were flushed. Major parts of the superstructure have been finished so that administrative port authorities were able to assume their functions in August 2012.

== Characteristics ==
With only limited commercial activity in Wilhelmshaven's hinterland, most cargo will need further transportation by feeder vessels, railway, or on the road. Expectations rest with the fact that JadeWeserPort will be the easternmost deep-water port in Northern Europe able to berth the largest container vessels in present and future use up to a size of 18,000 twenty-foot equivalent units. Therefore, it is hoped that a major share of the overseas container traffic of Scandinavian and Baltic nations including the western part of Russia will be handled here (map of feeder routes). Growth rates in container shipping are expected to at least remain at the present 7% per year.

The German railway company DB is upgrading the Wilhelmshaven–Oldenburg railway, to provide extra capacity for freight trains. The electrification of the rail connection was completed in December 2022.

== Port facilities ==
The port area consists of the container handling zone, a logistics zone, and major railway installations. There will be sixteen major cranes for the loading and unloading of ships. These cranes were at the date of their construction the largest in the world, able to handle ships with 25 parallel rows of containers.

The logistics zone allows for the establishment of cargo-handling facilities. The first installation is the Nordfrost fruit and reefer terminal, which opened in July 2012. It also houses a number of authorities, such as customs and agricultural services.

A marshalling yard with 16 tracks is situated at the northern edge of the port area, whereas the goods station with six tracks for loading and unloading of trains, are located in the center of the port area between the handling and the logistics zone.
