= Bremen–Oldenburg railway =

Railway line in Germany

Bremen–Oldenburg
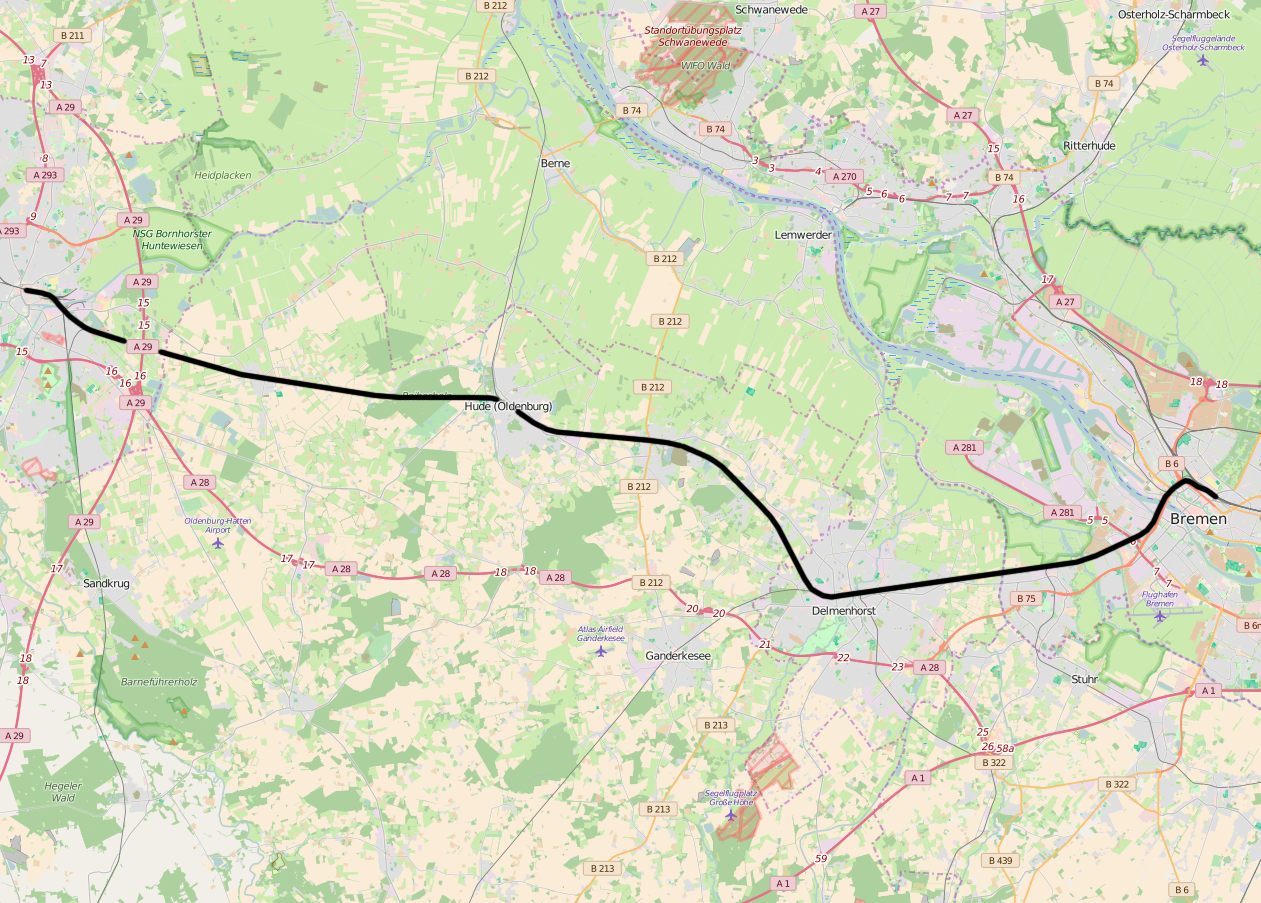

Overview
- Line number: 1500
- Locale: Lower Saxony and Bremen

Service
- Route number: 390

Technical
- Line length: 44.4 km (27.6 mi)
- Track gauge: 1,435 mm (4 ft 8 1/2 in) standard gauge
- Electrification: 15 kV/16.7 Hz AC overhead catenary
- Operating speed: 160 km/h (100 mph) (maximum)

The Bremen–Oldenburg railway is a 44.4 km (27.6 mi) long mainline railway that connects Oldenburg in the northwest of the German states of Lower Saxony and Bremen.

It is served by a daily Intercity Express service between Oldenburg and Munich, InterCity trains between Norddeich Mole, Oldenburg and Leipzig, as well as freight and regional trains. The Bremen S-Bahn also operates over the line.

== Route ==
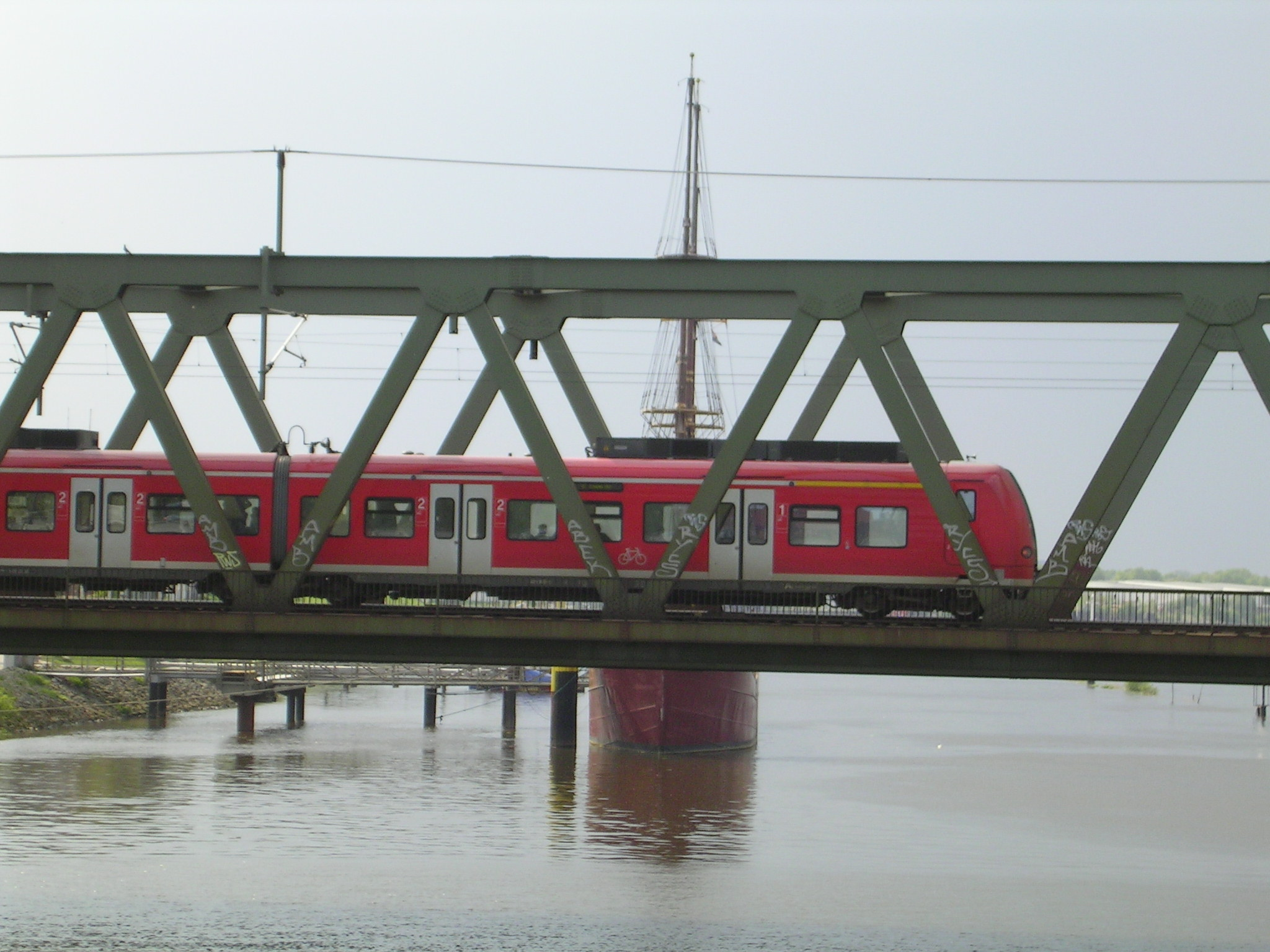
Weser bridge

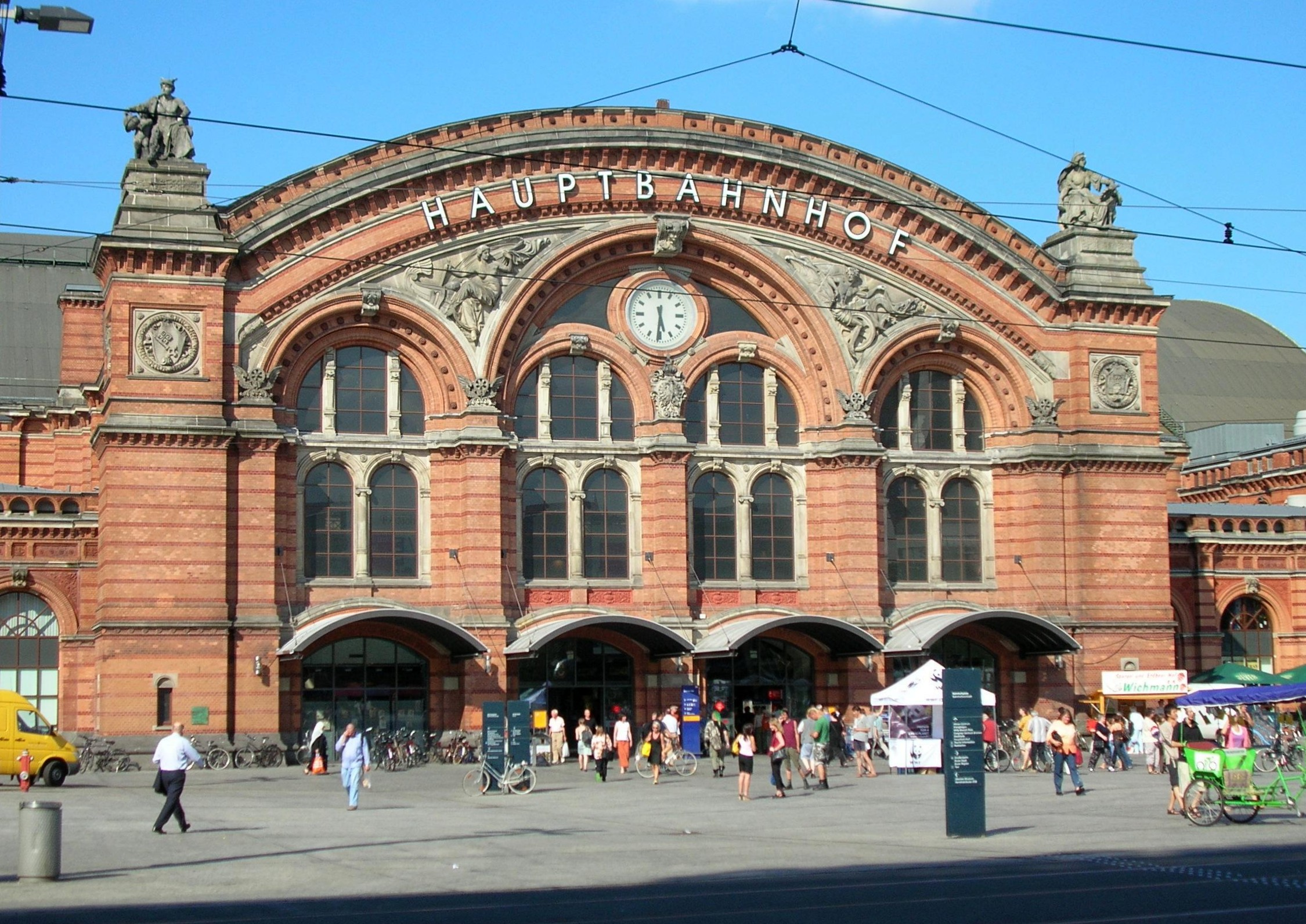
Bremen Hauptbahnhof

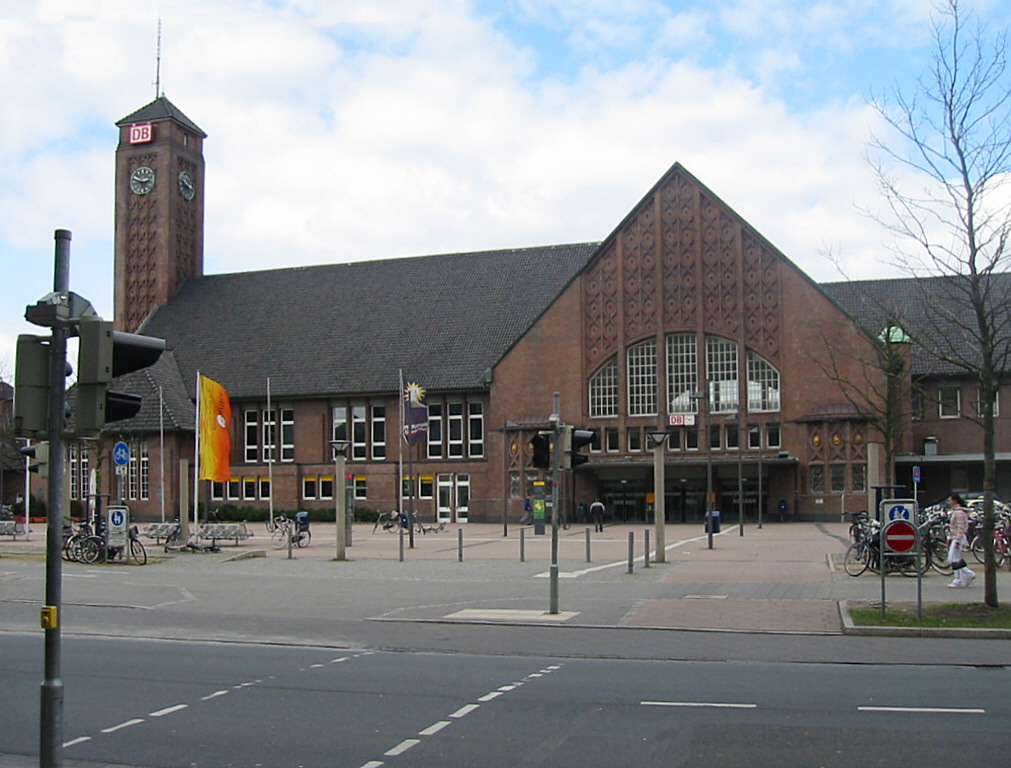
Oldenburg Hauptbahnhof

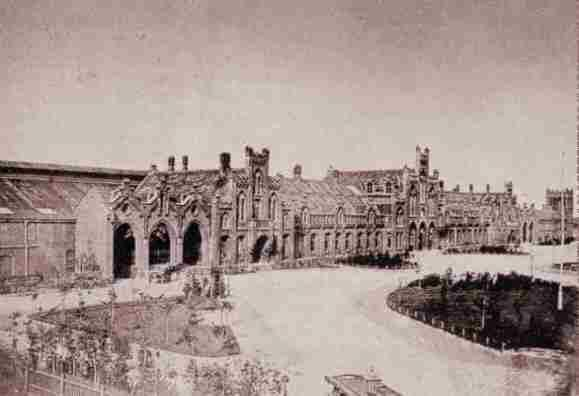
Old Oldenburg station 1885

The line leaves Bremen Hauptbahnhof at its western exit and snakes through several tight bends through the former main freight yard and the "northwest node" to highway 6 passing the junctions of many freight lines to the bridge over the Weser. Until the construction of the Weser tunnel, this was the northernmost permanent crossing of the river.

The line continues through Bremen-Neustadt in a westerly direction to Delmenhorst, where a busy line branches off to Vechta and Osnabrück (operated by NordWestBahn). From there it runs in a northwesterly direction towards Hude. There it connects with the line to Nordenham. In the Oldenburg district of Osternburg it joins the line from Osnabrück. The line crosses the Hunte on a bascule bridge to Oldenburg Hauptbahnhof.

== History ==
The track was a joint project of the states of Grand Duchy of Oldenburg State Railways and the Prussian state railways and together with the Oldenburg–Wilhelmshaven line was officially opened on 15 July 1867. Scheduled operation began to Oldenburg on the following day and to Wilhelmshaven in September. Two years later a connection was opened from Oldenburg to Leer on the Emsland Railway (Münster–Leer–Emden); in 1875 the line was opened to Nordenham. This connected all the ports between the Weser and the Ems to the south and east, in particular to Bremen, Hamburg and Hanover. From the beginning it was an important link in the northern German rail network.

In the Second World War, the Weser Bridge in Bremen was destroyed. A replacement structure was destroyed by ice in 1947, but was repaired within five weeks. The current bridge was completed in 1962.

== Current situation ==
Today the line is consistently double track, electrified and cleared for operations up to 160 km/h. Line 3 of the Bremen S-Bahn runs over line hourly from Bremen to Oldenburg and on to Bad Zwischenahn. The construction of the JadeWeserPort in Wilhelmshaven is expected to significantly increase freight traffic.
