= Bad Zwischenahn station =

Railway station in Bad Zwischenahn, Germany

Bad Zwischenahn
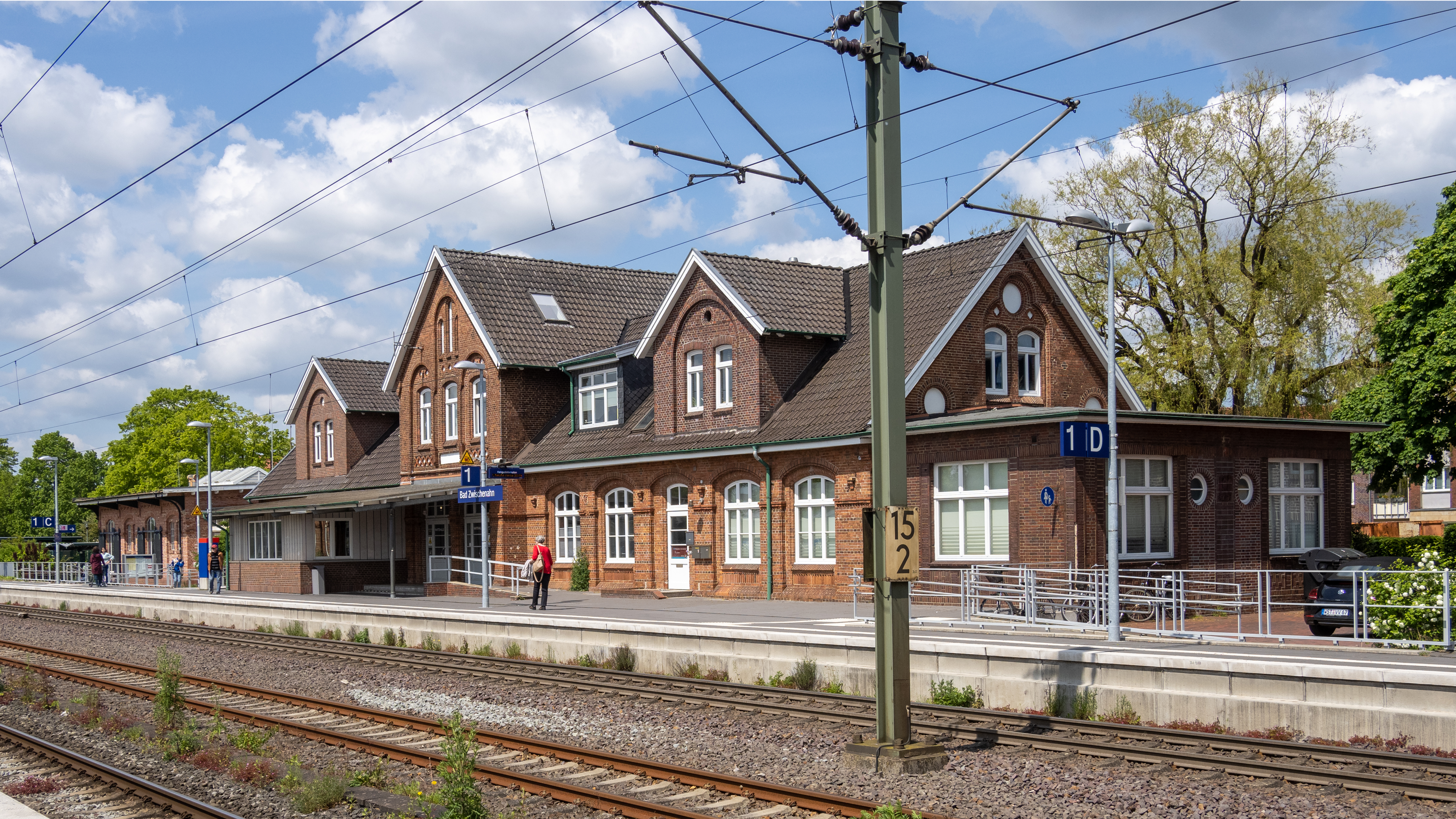
- Bad Zwischenahn railway station

General information
- Location: Bad Zwischenahn, Lower Saxony; Germany
- Coordinates: 53°10′57″N 8°00′12″E
- Line: Oldenburg–Leer railway
- Platforms: 2 side platforms
- Tracks: 2

Other information
- Fare zone: VBN: 750
- Website: www.bahnhof.de

Services
Preceding station	DB Fernverkehr	Following station
Westerstede-Ocholt towards Norddeich Mole	IC 56	Oldenburg Hbf towards Leipzig Hbf or Cottbus Hbf
Preceding station	DB Regio Nord	Following station
Westerstede-Ocholt towards Norddeich Mole	RE 1	Oldenburg Hbf towards Hannover Hbf
Preceding station	Bremen S-Bahn	Following station
Terminus	RS3	Oldenburg-Wechloy towards Bremen Hbf
Terminus	RS30	Oldenburg-Wechloy towards Bremen Hbf
Location

Bad Zwischenahn (German: Bahnhof Bad Zwischenahn) is a railway station located in Bad Zwischenahn, Germany. The station is located on the Oldenburg–Leer railway. The train services are operated by Deutsche Bahn and NordWestBahn.

== Train services ==
The following services currently call at the station:

- Intercity services IC 56 Norddeich - Emden - Leer - Bremen - Hannover - Braunschweig - Magdeburg - Leipzig / Berlin - Cottbus
- Regional services RE 1 Norddeich - Emden - Oldenburg - Bremen - Nienburg - Hanover
- Bremen S-Bahn services RS30 Bad Zwischenahn - Oldenburg - Delmerhorst - Bremen

== See also ==
- List of railway stations in Lower Saxony
