= Ina Korter =

German politician (born 1955)

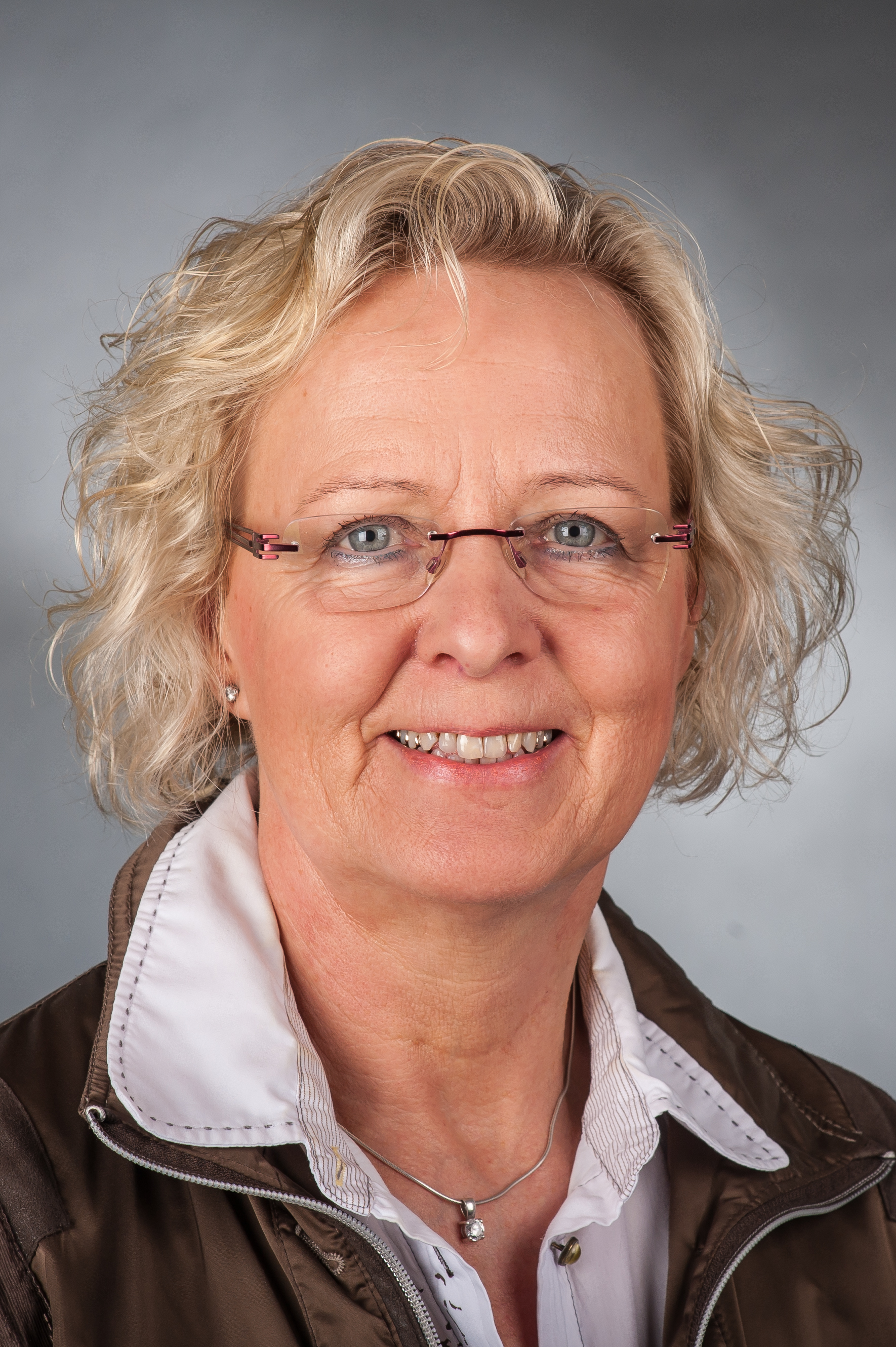
Korter in 2013

Ina Korter (born 8 January 1955, Nordenham, Lower Saxony) is a former German politician for the Alliance '90/The Greens.

== Political career ==
Korter became active with the Greens' antinuclear campaigns in 1982. She was a councillor in Wesermarsch from 1991 to 1996, and in Nordenham from 1996 to 1998. She studied teaching in Giessen and last taught at Paddstock School in Ovelgönne, before she was elected to the Lower Saxon Landtag in 2003 and remained until 2014.

== Personal life ==
Korter grew up with four siblings on the family farm near Nordenham. She has two adult children. As of 2011, she is in an all-woman band named Faltenrock.
