= Ludwig Münstermann =

German sculptor and master woodcarver

Ludwig Münstermann (c. 1560 or 1575 – 1638/39) was a German sculptor and master woodcarver from either Hamburg or Bremen. He worked in numerous churches and was a leading exponent of the North German Mannerist style in sculpture.

== Life and career ==
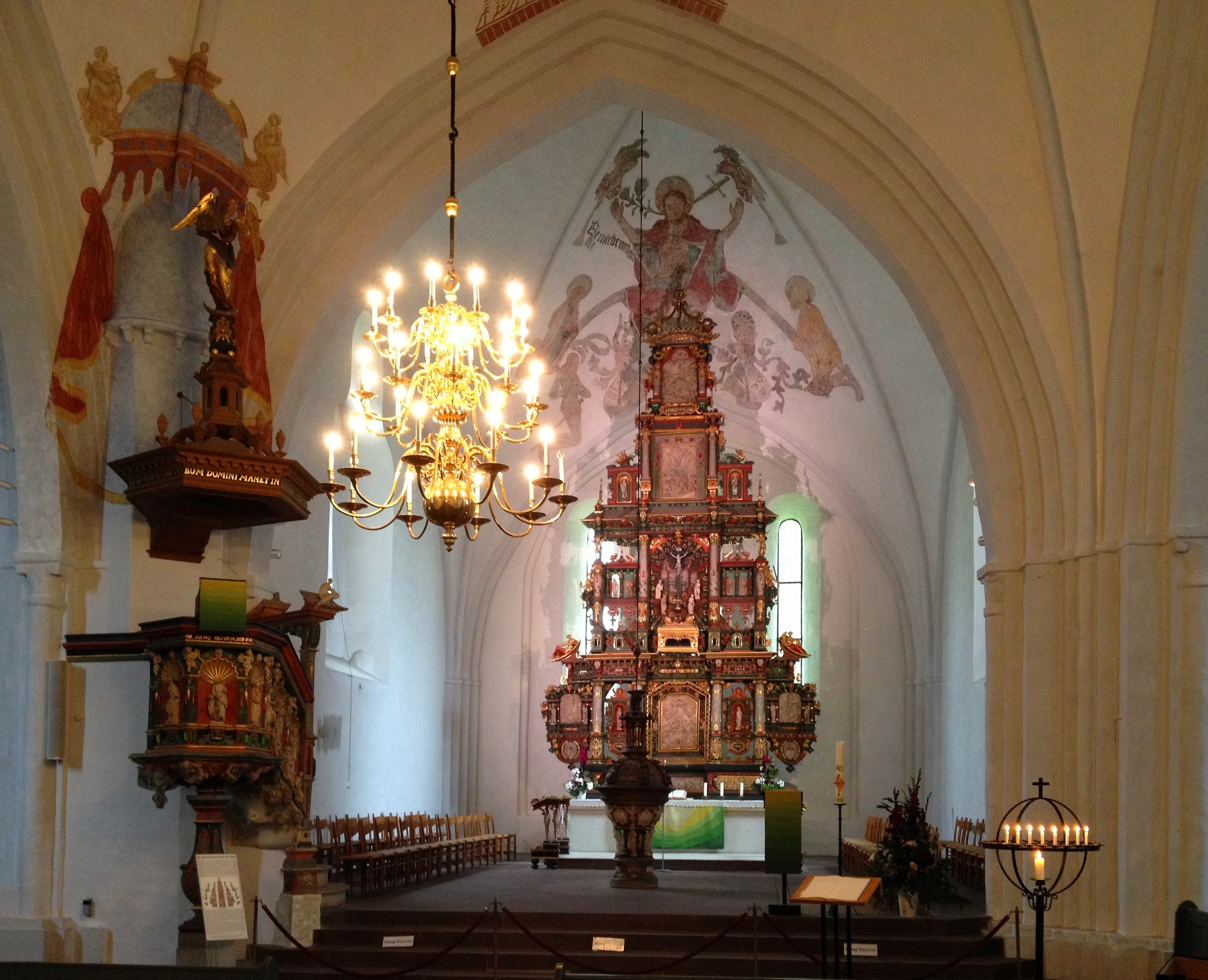
Altar, pulpit and baptismal font of Schlosskirche Varel

Münstermann is said to have been from either Hamburg or Bremen. He was active before 1599 in the workshop of the Bremen sculptor Hans Winter (1565–1603). Tonnies and Heinrich Münstermann were also woodworkers in Bremen at this period. Ludwig Münstermann became a master in the guild of turners in Hamburg in 1599. From 1607 to 1612, he worked on Schloss Oldenburg.

Münstermann carved many altars, pulpits and organ cases for churches, especially in the Duchy of Oldenburg. His largest surviving altar is in the castle church at Varel, where he worked on the altar, pulpit and font between 1613 and 1618. Around 1590 he worked in his winter studio on epitaphs for St Ansgar's church in Bremen. There are important altars, pulpits and font covers by Münstermann in two churches in Stadland, St Matthew's in Rodenkirchen (1629–31) and St Secundus' in Schwei (1618–38). The church in Hohenkirchen in Wangerland has an altar (1620) and pulpit (1628) by him, and St Hippolytus' church in Blexen in Nordenham has altar figures and a pulpit (1638). His organ case for the former castle chapel at Rotenburg an der Wümme (1608) and a stone statue of Hercules are in the Focke Museum in Bremen.

Münstermann is one of the most prominent representatives of North German Mannerist sculpture. His style is characterised by exaggerated figures in movement that may approach the grotesque and by dramatic expressivity. Depictions are framed by detailed mannerist ornamental and architectural settings. Ornate colouration in practically gaudy hues and shadings plays an important rôle in his aesthetic; however, this element has in part been effaced by unsympathetic 'restorations'. It is significant that Münstermann first attracted attention from art historians in the Expressionist era.

A street in Barmbek-Nord in the Hamburg-Nord district of Hamburg is named for him.
