= Rodenkirchen (Oldb) station =

Railway station in Germany

Rodenkirchen (Oldb)

General information
- Location: Rodenkirchen, Stadland, Lower Saxony; Germany
- Coordinates: 53.3996°N 8.4546°E
- Line: Hude-Blexen railway
- Platforms: 2
- Tracks: 2

Other information
- Station code: 5306
- DS100 code: HRDK
- Category: 6
- Fare zone: VBN: 840

Services
Preceding station	Bremen S-Bahn	Following station
Kleinensiel towards Nordenham	RS4	Brake (Unterweser) towards Bremen Hbf
Location

Rodenkirchen (Oldb) (German: Bahnhof Rodenkirchen (Oldb)) is a railway station located in Rodenkirchen, Germany. The station is located on the Hude-Blexen railway. The train services are operated by NordWestBahn. The station has been part of the Bremen S-Bahn since December 2010.

== Train services ==
The following services currently call at the station:

- Bremen S-Bahn services RS 4 Nordenham - Hude - Delmenhorst - Bremen
