= Brake (Unterweser) station =

Railway station in Brake, Germany

Brake (Unterw)
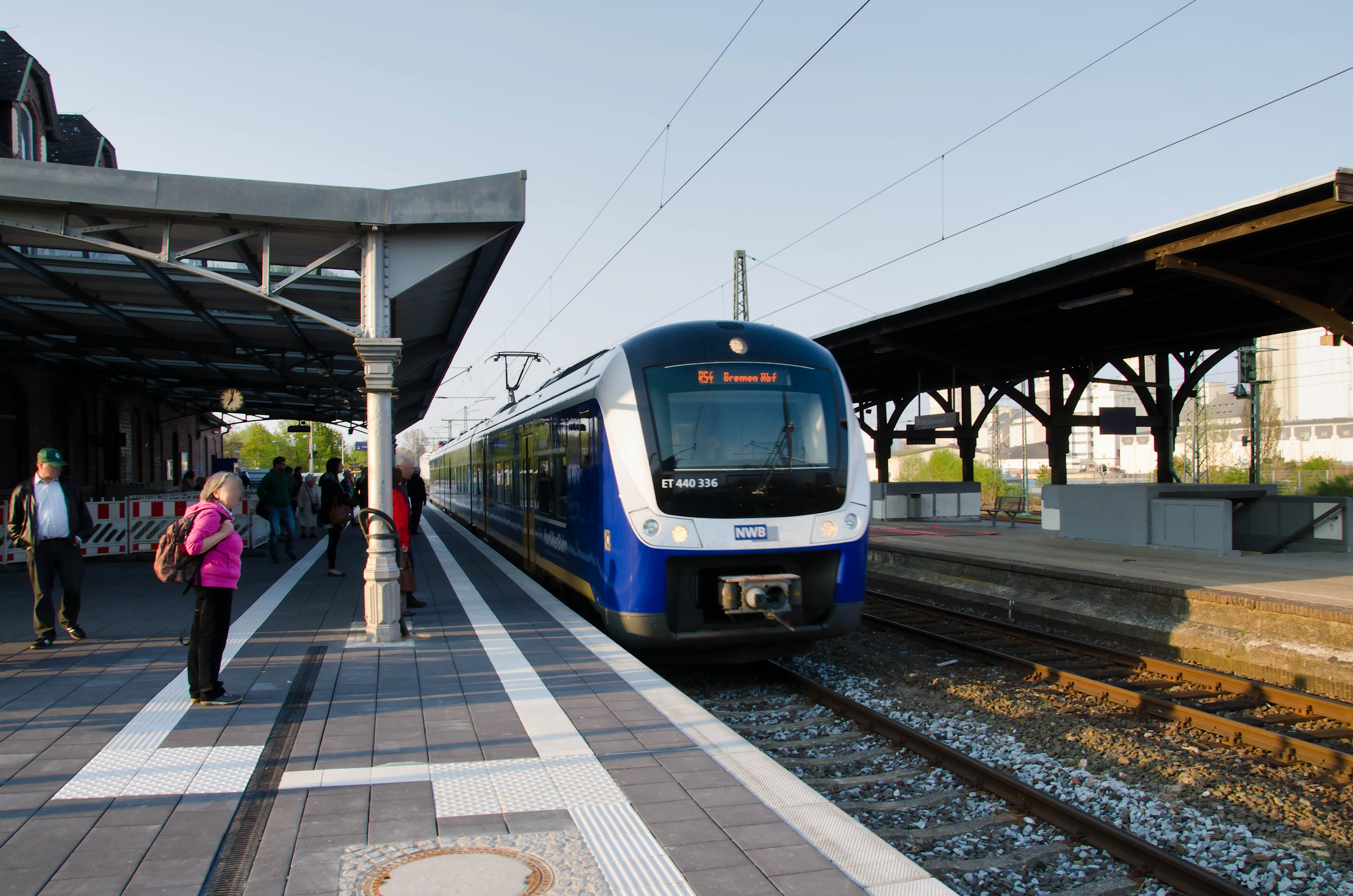

General information
- Location: Brake, Lower Saxony; Germany
- Coordinates: 53.3287°N 8.4813°E

Other information
- Station code: 0815
- DS100 code: HBKE
- Category: 6
- Fare zone: VBN: 830

Services
Preceding station	Bremen S-Bahn	Following station
Rodenkirchen (Oldb) towards Nordenham	RS4	Elsfleth towards Bremen Hbf
Location

Brake (Unterweser) (German: Bahnhof Brake (Unterweser)) is a railway station located in Brake, Germany. The station is located on the Hude-Blexen railway. The train services are operated by NordWestBahn. The station has been part of the Bremen S-Bahn since December 2010.

== Train services ==
The following services currently call at the station:

- Bremen S-Bahn services RS 4 Nordenham - Hude - Delmenhorst - Bremen
