= Jade River =

Jade River may refer to:

- Jade (river), a river in Lower Saxony
- Jade River (radar), a CW Radar used with the Bristol Bloodhound and English Electric Thunderbird surface to air missiles
