= Premium AEROTEC =

German aerospace manufacturing company

Premium AEROTEC GmbH
- Type: GmbH
- Industry: Aerospace; Defence
- Revenue: €1.5 billion in 2012
- Owner: Airbus
- Number of employees: Over 6000

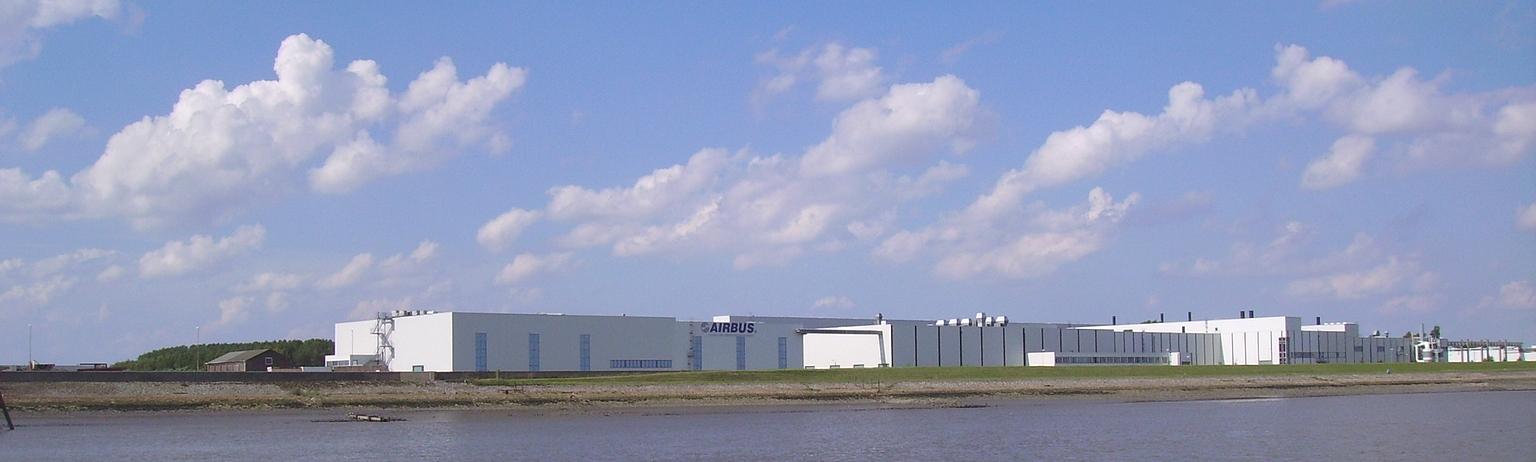
Premium AEROTEC factory in Nordenham

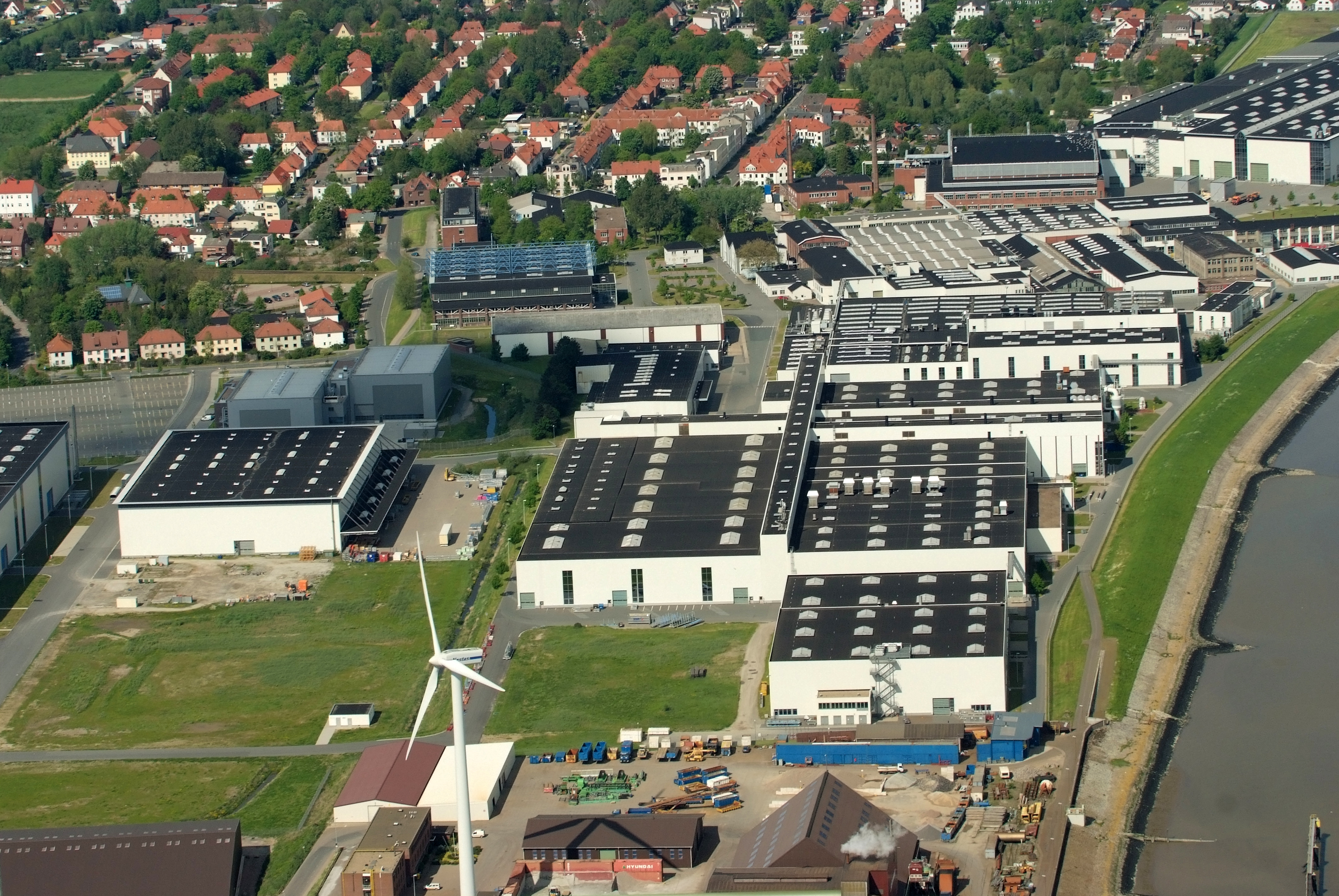
Aerial view of Premium Aerotec in Nordenham (May 2012)

Premium AEROTEC is a German aerospace manufacturing business, headquartered in Augsburg in Germany. It is a subsidiary of Airbus.

The company was created in September 2008 as a spin off from the multinational aerospace group EADS, which subsequently rebranded itself as Airbus Group. While a large portion of Premium AEROTEC's business has been derived from its parent company, it has also forged partnerships with other manufacturing groups, including Dassault Aviation, Vought and Latécoère. The company has positioned itself as a Tier One supplier of aerostructures, which it produces at its facilities in Germany and Romania.

== History ==
Prior to its establishment as an individual entity, the assets of Premium AEROTEC principally existed within the multinational aerospace group EADS. Its independence came as a consequence of several economic factors affecting the business; during 2007, EADS' management decided to respond to events, such a weakening US dollar and the high investment needed by both the Airbus A380 and A350 XWB airliners, by launching a restructuring initiative intended to streamline the group, divest several non-core activities, and cut costs. Accordingly, in September 2008, three factories were spun off from EADS to form Premium AEROTEC; from the onset, it operated as a wholly owned subsidiary of EADS, which has since been rebranded as Airbus Group. Aerospace periodical Flight International compared the move to Boeing's then-recent spin-off of Spirit AeroSystems.

The newly-formed Premium AEROTEC almost immediately committed to expansion in readiness for the production of forward fuselage sections for the A350 XWB airliner. Additional contracts for work on the A350 XWB programme were also received over the following years. In 2009, Airbus announced that, despite the impact of the Great Recession, it would maintain commitments to its suppliers at a steady rate to support them. In June 2010, Premium AEROTEC was reportedly on-schedule for its A350 XWB commitments.

In January 2009, Airbus stated its confidence that its recent spin-offs, including Premium AEROTEC, would be ready to seek out their own partners within three to five years. That same year, Premium AEROTEC was reportedly started to actively seek out additional customers for its products; having positioned itself as a Tier One supplier of aerostructures. During 2012, it was announced that the firm had developed a corrugated wing spar on behalf of the North American aerospace firm Boeing. While the company also performs work for a variety of other aerospace manufacturers, Premium AEROTEC remains closely aligned with the needs of Airbus, which is a leading customer as well as the owner of the firm. During 2014, it was announced that the company planned to employ 3D printing technologies in its regular component manufacturing process within two years.

In April 2018, Premium Aerotec chose to adopt Skywise, Airbus's digital services platform, with the goal of improving its supply chain processes. During early 2020, Airbus recorded a €100m restructuring charge in relation to Premium Aerotec.

== Locations ==
Aerotec operates factories in:

- Augsburg, Germany, founded in 1916 by Bayerische Rumpler Werke
- Bremen, Germany, founded in 1905 by Deutsche Schiffs- und Maschinenbau AG
- Nordenham, Germany
- Varel, Germany, founded in 1936 as Motorenwerk Varel; this site includes a close partnership with ThyssenKrupp who provide metal machining and logistics facilities
- Ghimbav, Romania, founded in 2011 as Premium AEROTEC's first factory outside of Germany

The Varel and Nordenham sites were former Airbus factories; the Augsburg site belonged to EADS Military Air Systems.

== Products ==
Premium AEROTEC is a tier-one supplier to Airbus; it produces metal components for all Airbus airliners and also award-winning titanium parts for the Airbus A400M

A range of large composite parts are also made:

- Fuselage sections for the Eurofighter Typhoon are made at Varel, and then assembled in Augsburg.
- Fuselage sections for the Airbus A400M;
- Several composite sections of the Airbus A350 are being produced, including the aft pressure bulkhead and a 93 square metre panel for the fuselage
- On behalf of Vought and Latécoère, elements are being made for the Boeing 737 and Dassault Falcon.
