= Varel =

- Town
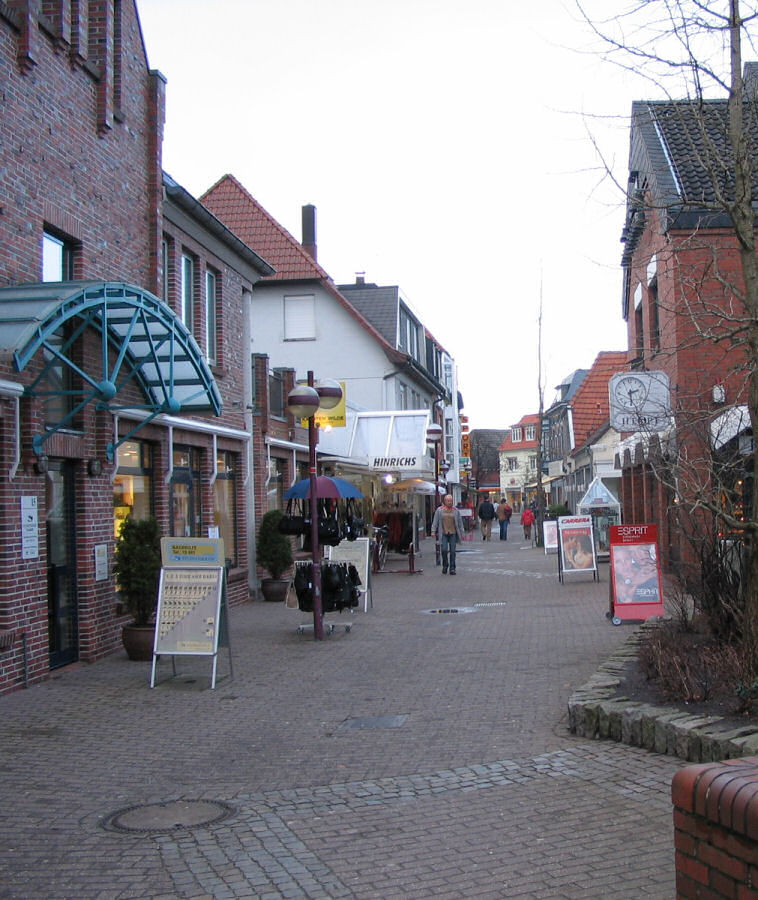
- Pedestrian area in Varel

- Flag Coat of arms

- Location of Varel within Friesland district
- Interactive map of Varel
- Location within Germany Location within Lower Saxony
- Coordinates: 53°23′49″N 08°08′10″E
- Country: Germany
- State: Lower Saxony
- District: Friesland
- Subdivisions: 32 districts

Government
  - Mayor (2021–26): Gerd-Christian Wagner (SPD)

Area
  - Total: 113.75 km^{2} (43.92 sq mi)
- Elevation: 0–12 m (0–39 ft)

Population (2025-12-31)
  - Total: 24,635
  - Density: 216.57/km^{2} (560.92/sq mi)
- Time zone: UTC+01:00 (CET)
  - Summer (DST): UTC+02:00 (CEST)
- Postal codes: 26316
- Dialling codes: 04451
- Vehicle registration: FRI
- Website: www.varel.de

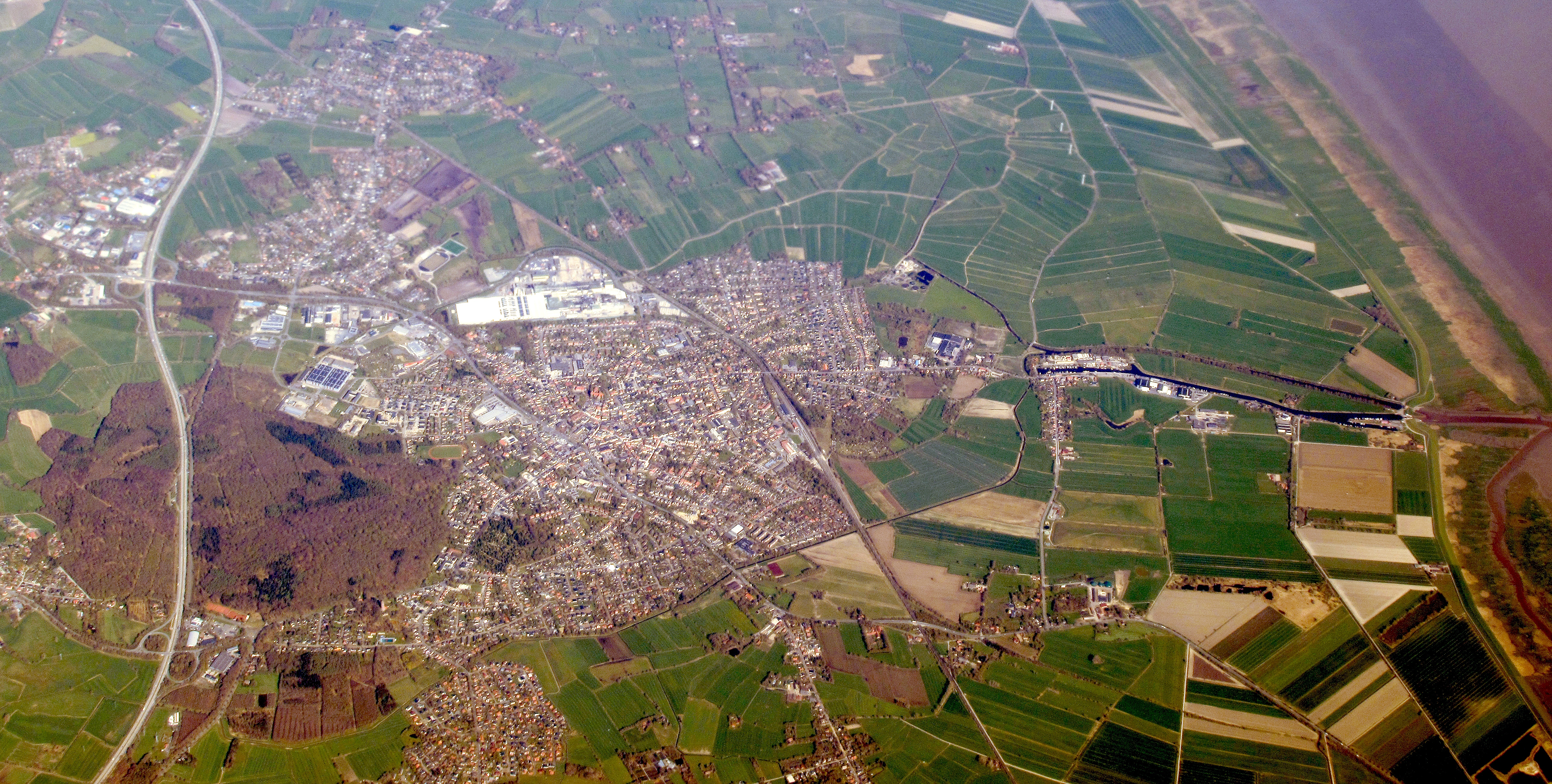
Aerial view of Varel

Varel (German pronunciation: [ˈfaːʁəl]) is a town in the district of Friesland, in Lower Saxony, Germany. It is situated near the Jade River and the Jade Bight, approximately 15 kilometres (9.3 mi) south of Wilhelmshaven and 30 kilometres (19 mi) north of Oldenburg. With a population of 23,984 (2020) it is the biggest town in the district of Friesland.

== Geography ==
Varel is located south of the Jade Bight at the North Sea on the Geest. Over time, the city expanded into lower areas as the construction of dykes helped to secure these areas from floods.

The environment of Varel is shaped by agriculture, forests and the sea.

=== Neighbour municipalities ===
Jade in the district of Wesermarsch is the Eastern neighbour municipality of Varel. In the South of Varel one will find the municipalities Rastede and Wiefelstede which are part of the district of Ammerland. The municipality of Bockhorn is located in the West of Varel. Bockhorn is also part of the district of Friesland.

=== Segmentation of the city ===
Varel is segmented into 21 localities. Besides the downtown area these are Altjührden, Borgstede, Büppel, Dangast, Dangastermoor, Grünenkamp, Hohelucht, Hohenberge, Jeringhave, Jethausen, Langendamm, Moorhausen, Neudorf, Neuenwege, Obenstrohe, Rallenbüschen, Rosenberg, Seghorn, Streek and Winkelsheide. Further villages in the municipality are Almsee, Bramloge, Brunne, Jethausermoor, Logemoor, Plaggenkrug, Rahling, Rotenhahn, Schwarzenberg, Tange, Vareler Schleuse and Wilkenhausen.

=== Usage of areas ===
A little more than three fourths of the area of Varel is agricultural land. The size of the forest – around ten percent of the total size – is remarkably high for a city at the North Sea coast.

== Castle church ==
The castle church is the oldest building in Varel. The first part of the church is believed to have been built in 1144. The tower was added between 1200 and 1250, originally as twin towers, which were rebuilt in today's form first in 1651 and then in 1737. The altar, font and pulpit were carved in 1613 – 1618 by Ludwig Münstermann. The altar is nearly 10 metres (33 ft) high and is one of the main works of Northern German Mannerism.

Before the Protestant Reformation, the patron saint was Saint Peter. Today, the castle church is a Lutheran church, with no patron saint. The church was formerly one of the buildings of the castle, which was demolished in the 19th century soon after a fire destroyed most parts of it.

== Notable people ==
- Charlotte Sophie of Aldenburg (1715–1800), ruling Countess of Varel and confidante of Voltaire and Frederick the Great
- Johann Gerhard Oncken (1800–1884), founder of the German and continental European Baptist churches
- Lothar Meyer (1830–1895), developed modern periodic table of the elements independently of Dmitri Mendeleev.
- Oskar Emil Meyer (1834–1909), physicist, studied the viscosity of gases.
- Frederick Ludwig Hoffman (1865–1946), statistician.
- Wilhelm Hegeler (1870–1943), writer and novelist.
- Friedrich Wegener (1907–1990), Nazi pathologist, studied granulomatosis with polyangiitis
- Hildegard Behrens (1937–2009), singer (dramatic soprano)
- Hans-Paul Bürkner (born 1951), CEO of the Boston Consulting Group
- Heiko Daxl (1957–2012), media artist, exhibition curator, art gallery owner and design / art collector; grew up locally
- Massiv in Mensch (founded in 1996), Industrial music duo

=== Sport ===
- Carl Carls (1880–1958), chess champion
- Ines Varenkamp (born 1963), cyclist
- Markus Eichler (born 1982), cyclist
- Deniz Undav (born 1996), footballer who has played over 260 games
- Esther Henseleit (born 1999), professional golfer

== International relations ==
Varel is twinned with:

- Jackson, Michigan (United States)

== See also ==
- Melitta
- Friesland Porzellan
