= Berne station =

Bern or Berne is the name of several railway stations in Central Europe:

- Bern railway station in Bern, Switzerland
- Berne station (Bremen S-Bahn) in Berne, Germany
- Berne station (Hamburg U-Bahn) in Hamburg, Germany
