= Jade, Germany =

Jade
- Municipality
- Coat of arms

- Location of Jade within Wesermarsch district
- Interactive map of Jade
- Location within Germany Location within Lower Saxony
- Coordinates: 53°20′40″N 08°14′25″E
- Country: Germany
- State: Lower Saxony
- District: Wesermarsch

Government
  - Mayor (2021–26): Henning Kaars

Area
  - Total: 94.05 km^{2} (36.31 sq mi)
- Elevation: 5 m (16 ft)

Population (2025-12-31)
  - Total: 5,955
  - Density: 63.32/km^{2} (164.0/sq mi)
- Time zone: UTC+01:00 (CET)
  - Summer (DST): UTC+02:00 (CEST)
- Postal codes: 26349
- Dialling codes: 04454, 04455
- Vehicle registration: BRA
- Website: gemeinde-jade.de

Jade (German pronunciation: [ˈjaːdə]) is a municipality in the district of Wesermarsch, in Lower Saxony, Germany. It is situated on the river Jade, approx. 23 km (14 mi) north of Oldenburg, and 50 km (31 mi) northwest of Bremen.
