= Kleinensiel station =

Railway station in Germany

Kleinensiel
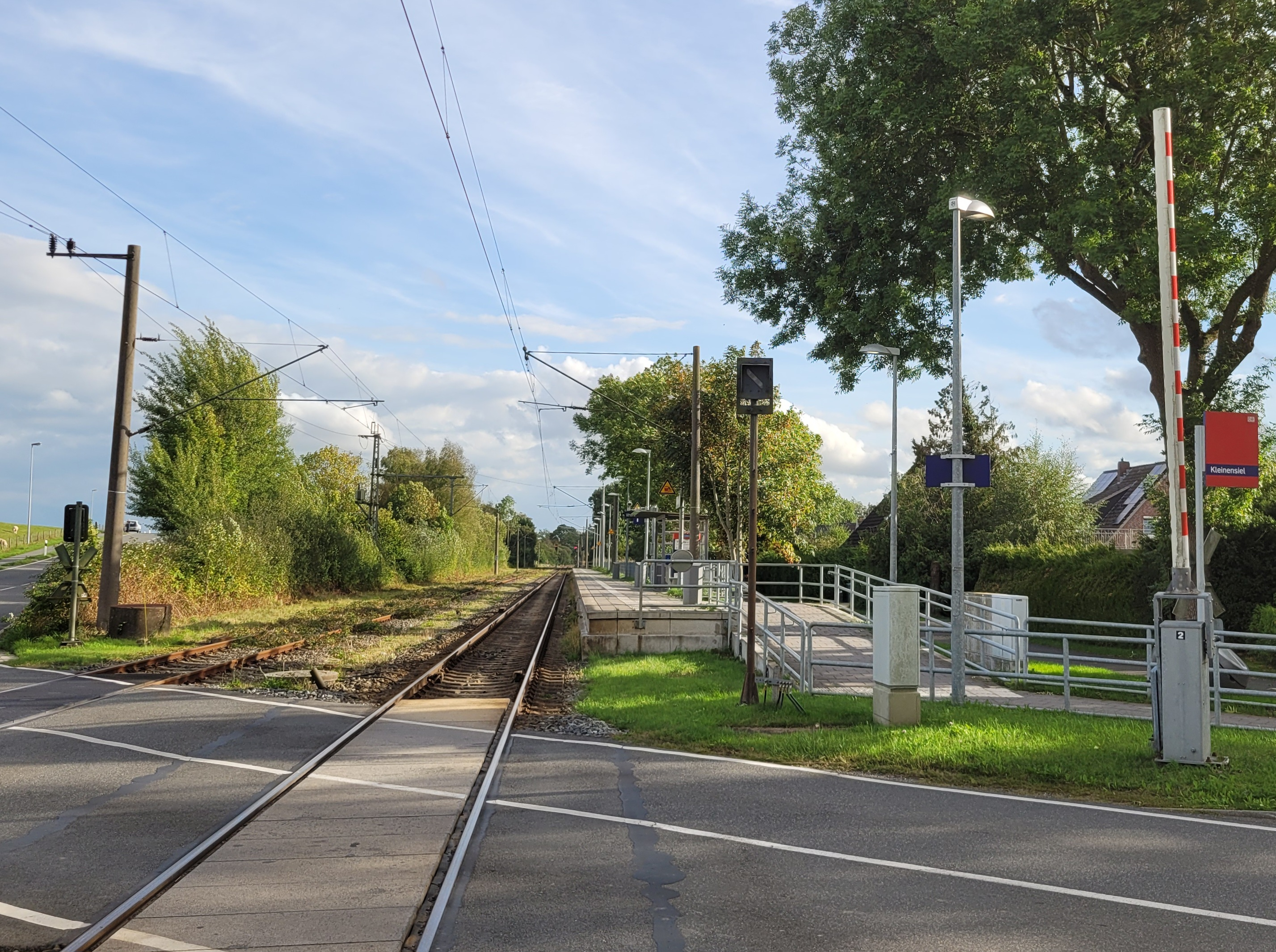
- Bahnhof Kleinensiel

General information
- Location: Kleinensiel, Stadland, Lower Saxony; Germany
- Coordinates: 53.4430°N 8.4765°E
- Line: Hude-Blexen railway
- Platforms: 2
- Tracks: 2

Other information
- Station code: 3248
- DS100 code: HKSI
- Category: 6
- Fare zone: VBN: 840 and 850
- Website: www.bahnhof.de

Services
Preceding station	Bremen S-Bahn	Following station
Nordenham Terminus	RS4	Rodenkirchen (Oldb) towards Bremen Hbf
Location

Kleinensiel (German: Bahnhof Kleinensiel) is a railway station located in Kleinensiel, Germany. The station is located on the Hude-Blexen railway. The train services are operated by NordWestBahn. The station has been part of the Bremen S-Bahn since December 2010.

Before the Weser tunnel was opened, the railway crossing adjacent to the station was part of one of the main ferry approaches to cross the Weser river, often resulting in delays for motorists when closed. A bit south of the station, a freight track branches off the line to serve the KKU nuclear power plant.

== Train services ==
The following services currently call at the station:

- Bremen S-Bahn services RS 4 Nordenham - Hude - Delmenhorst - Bremen
