= Elsfleth station =

Railway station in Elsfleth, Germany

Elsfleth

General information
- Location: Elsfleth, Lower Saxony; Germany
- Coordinates: 53.2344°N 8.4639°E
- Line: Hude-Blexen railway
- Platforms: 2
- Tracks: 2

Other information
- Station code: 1561
- DS100 code: HELS
- Category: 6
- Fare zone: VBN: 830

Services
Preceding station	Bremen S-Bahn	Following station
Brake (Unterweser) towards Nordenham	RS4	Berne towards Bremen Hbf
Location

Elsfleth (German: Bahnhof Elsfleth) is a railway station located in Elsfleth, Germany. The station is located on the Hude-Blexen railway. The train services are operated by NordWestBahn. The station has been part of the Bremen S-Bahn since December 2010.

== Train services ==
The following services currently call at the station:

- Bremen S-Bahn services RS 4 Nordenham - Hude - Delmenhorst - Bremen
