= J. Müller =

- Type: Private
- Industry: Maritime logistics
- Founded: 1821
- Founders: Johann Müller
- Headquarters: Brake (Unterweser), Germany
- Key people: Jan Müller (CEO)
- Products: Port terminal operations, freight transportation, logistics services

J. Müller is a German group of companies with its registered office in Brake (Unterweser). The company was established in 1821 and has been family-owned ever since. J. Müller has its own seaport terminals in Brake and Bremen and operates these terminals for the handling and seaport logistics of bulk goods and packaged goods. In addition, the group is active in various other fields of the economy, including in the trade of steel, wood and animal proteins (fish meal). J. Müller AG is the parent company of J. Müller Weser GmbH & Co. KG.

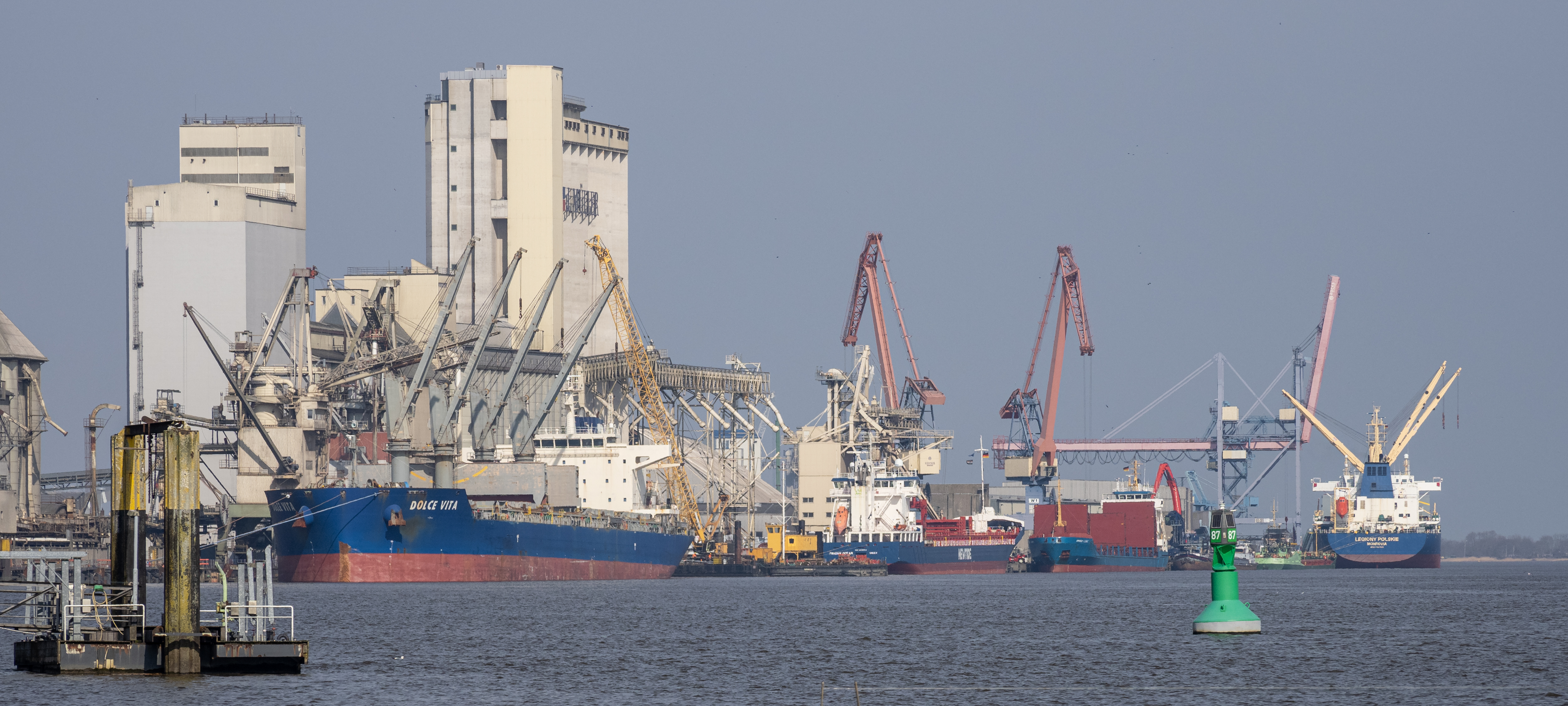
Brake Seaport with silos of J. Müller

== Company Structure ==
The J. Müller group includes four more companies in addition to the public limited company, which acts as the group's holding company. Parts of the operational business of J. Müller Weser are outsourced to specialised subsidiaries.

=== J. MÜLLER AG ===
J. Müller Aktiengesellschaft carries out all of the key tasks of the group. This primarily includes the strategic and organisational development of the company and the management of the investment assets.

=== J. MÜLLER Weser ===
In 2018, the group's operational business was streamlined to J. MÜLLER Weser GmbH & Co. KG as a result of the merger of several subsidiaries. Since this point in time, this company has been implementing the product-oriented and market-oriented alignment of the group.

=== LogServ ===
The subsidiary LogServ Logistik Services operates Europe's largest plant for goods handling and the storage of solid and liquid sulphur at its location in Brake.

=== B-LOG ===
In the form of a joint venture company, J. MÜLLER Weser carries out lorry transportation of GMP+ compliant agricultural products and breakbulk via B-LOG Bulk Logistic.

=== MÜLLER & OORBURG Logistics ===
MÜLLER & OORBURG Logistics GmbH also operates as a joint venture company. The company focuses on the Europe-wide chartering of barges at the terminals in Brake and Bremen.

== Business divisions ==
J. Müller has a trimodal terminal at the port in Brake, which enables the onwards transportation of goods by ship, rail or lorry. In accordance with the requirements for the processing of goods, which sometimes vary significantly, products can be handled on-site or stored at a location that is separate from the transshipment location.

=== Agricultural products ===
One of the company's primary fields of activity is the shipping and storage of agricultural products. Around 4 million tonnes of agricultural goods are handled each year at the Brake site. The goods primarily include feed, feed additives, grain and eco products, as well as fertiliser.

=== Forestry products ===
One of J. Müller's fields of activity has been the transshipment of paper pulp since 1968. These goods include paper, round timber, sawn timber and various derived timber products. These goods are predominantly exported for the construction industry in the US, North Africa and Great Britain. With more than a million transshipment tonnes a year, Brake seaport is the largest import port for paper pulp in Germany.

=== Maritime proteins ===
The port terminal in Bremen, which specialises in the transshipment of fish meal and krill meal, has silo capacities of 65,000 tonnes. With an unloading capacity of 20,000 tonnes a day, J. Müller also has the largest connected silo installation in Europe.

=== Freight and shipping services ===
In addition to the transshipment of goods at the company's port terminals, the provision of ship services is an area of activity in which J. Müller operates. These services include the provision and chartering of ships and the handling of administrative matters typical to the field of shipping.

=== Further business divisions ===
The Brake port facilities have been modernised and expanded thanks to high investment levels. The Niedersachsenkai, which opened in 2009, offers the corresponding special vehicles and heavy goods areas, which also enable the transshipment of packaged goods, heavy machinery and wind energy plants. The 450-metre-long quay with a total of 500,000 m^{2} of potential space is also a significant transshipment location for the European iron and steel market. The processing of these goods is summarised under the breakbulk business division.

== History ==
In 1821 Johann Müller founded a Freight forwarder business on the Lower Weser. In the following years he specialized in the direct handling of goods and transport. In 1862, the railway line between Bremerhaven and Geestemünde was built, which led to losses in maritime trade and thus also in J. Müller. During the time of National Socialism, the business of the company continued. In 1937, Hans Müller founded an inland shipping company and expanded crane operations in Brake.

1953 Müller bought the Bremer-Besigheimer Ölfabriken at Bremer Holzhafen (one of Bremen harbours). Today this place is the headquarter of J. Müller Weser GmbH. The company Bremer-Besigheimer Ölfabriken was founded in Besigheim in 1895 and opened a branch in Bremer Holzhafen. From 1920, only the branch was operated on the Weser. In 2008 the legal form of the management holding was changed from a GmbH & Co. KG to a stock corporation. Until 2015, the group structure was retained with the connection of the most important business areas as independent companies below the management holding. From the end of 2015 to the end of 2018, the main operating companies and thus the entire operational business were combined in several steps through mergers and acquisitions to form J. Müller Weser GmbH & Co. KG, based in Brake.

== Seaport Brake ==
The seaport Brake (seehafen Brake) is today dominated by the facilities and extensive areas by J. Müller. The company also sells space for port-related industrial settlements at the Brake Logistics Center (BLC), in the Niedersachsen Port (Boitwarder Groden) and development areas in the Niedersachsenkai area.

The company and its CEO Jan Müller is committed to the controversial and court-contested Weservertiefung. Jan Müller said, this would be important, so that ships with grain bulk could run his plant in Brake.
