= Butjadingen =

- Municipality
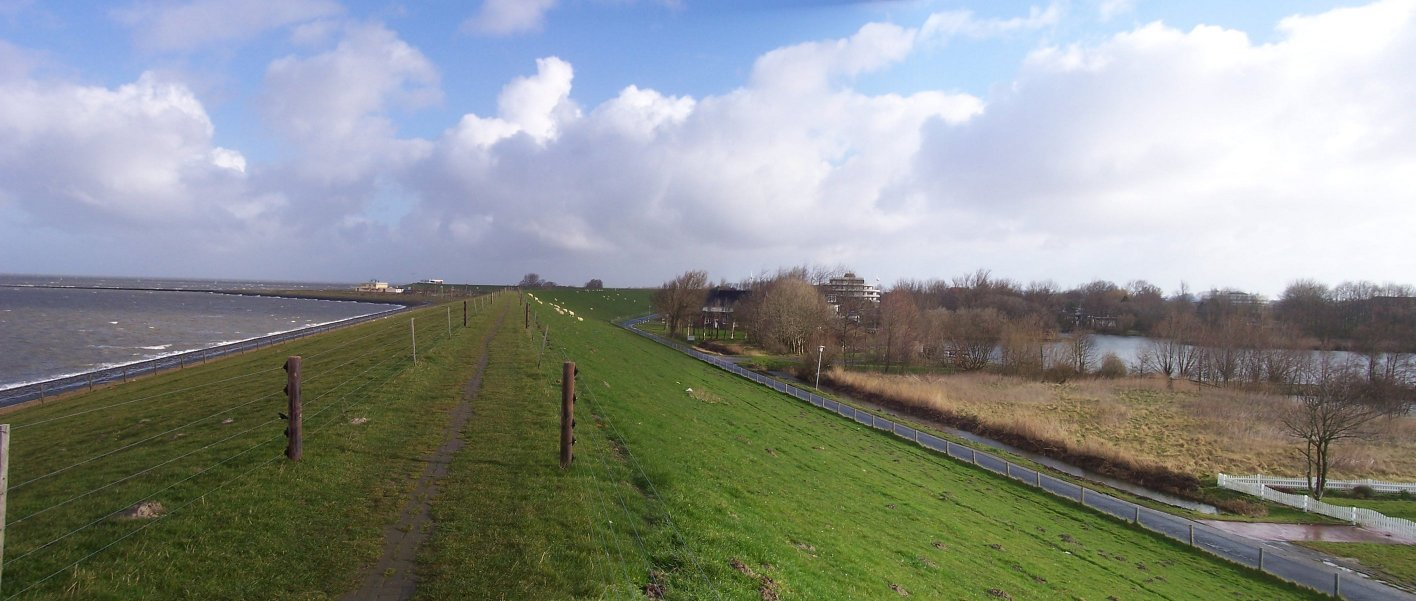

- Coat of arms

- Location of Butjadingen within Wesermarsch district
- Interactive map of Butjadingen
- Location within Germany Location within Lower Saxony
- Coordinates: 53°33′N 8°20′E
- Country: Germany
- State: Lower Saxony
- District: Wesermarsch

Government
  - Mayor (2020–25): Axel Linneweber

Area
  - Total: 129.55 km^{2} (50.02 sq mi)
- Elevation: 2 m (6.6 ft)

Population (2025-12-31)
  - Total: 6,048
  - Density: 46.68/km^{2} (120.9/sq mi)
- Time zone: UTC+01:00 (CET)
  - Summer (DST): UTC+02:00 (CEST)
- Postal codes: 26969
- Dialling codes: 04733, 04735, 04736
- Vehicle registration: BRA
- Website: www.gemeinde-butjadingen.de

Butjadingen (German pronunciation: [bʊtˈjaːdɪŋən]) is a peninsula and municipality in the Wesermarsch district, in Lower Saxony, Germany.

== Geography ==
Butjadingen is situated on the German North Sea coast. It is bordered on the west and southwest by the Jade River and the east by the Weser River. It forms the northern part of the Wesermarsch district and has a rather low population. The political borough of Butjadingen adjoins Nordenham which geographically is also part of the peninsula Butjadingen.

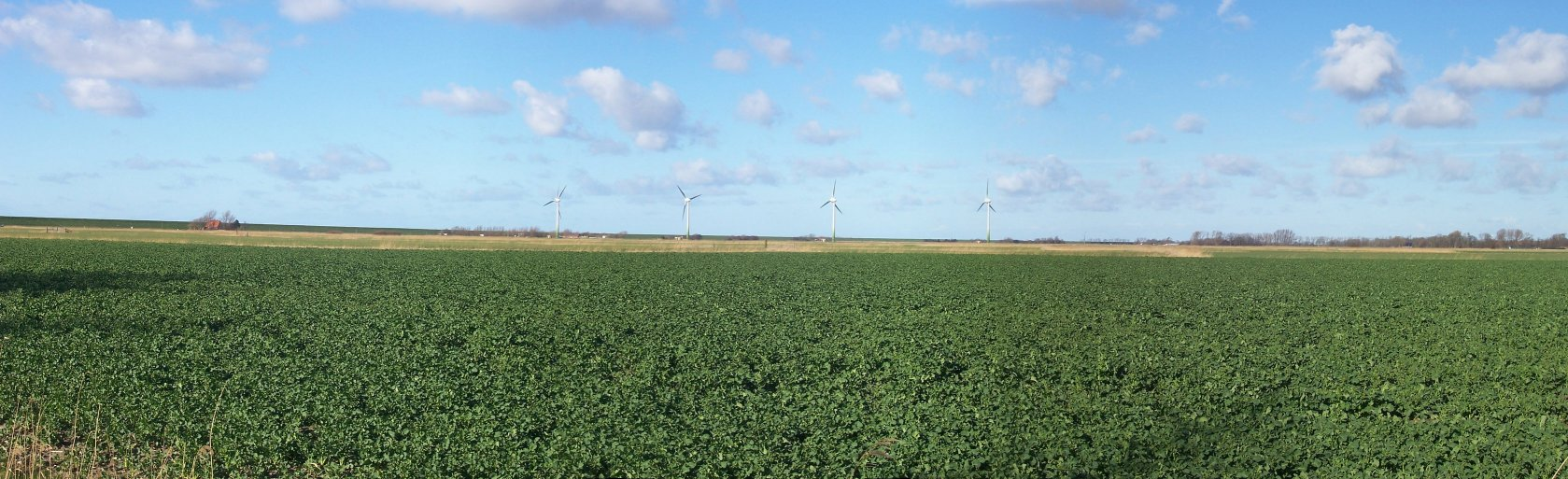
Typical view of Butjadingen

The peninsula was formed during the Middle Ages when huge floods created today's North Sea coastlines. After the Second Marcellus Flood on January 13, 1362 (which occurred around the day of Marcelli Pontificis) Butjadingen temporarily became an island.

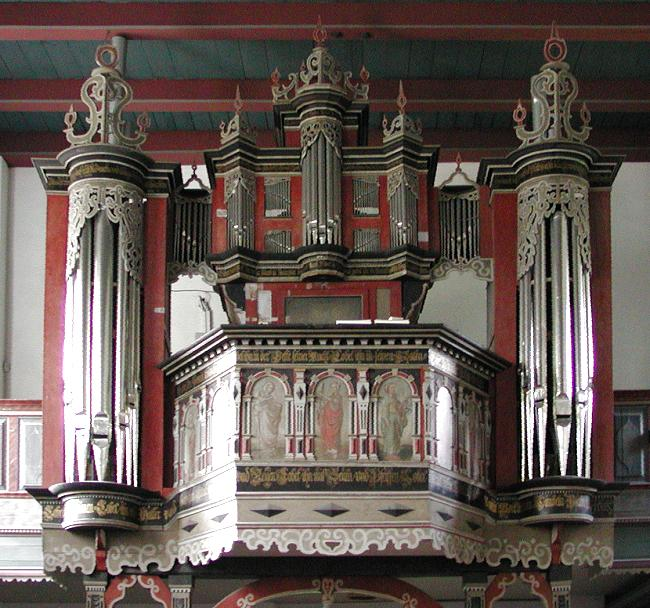
Pipe organ at the St. Laurentius Church, Langwarden (Butjadingen)

Its name is derived from Frisian "Buten" (=outside) and "Jade" and thus means the lands on the other side of the Jade River.

In front of the peninsula is the Wadden Sea which stretches between the Jade's and the Weser's mouths about 23 kilometers to the northwest beyond the Mellum island. It is part of the Nationalpark Niedersächsisches Wattenmeer (Lower Saxony Wadden Sea National Park), one of three German Wadden Sea National Parks.

== Economy ==
Agriculture and tourism constitute the bulk of its economic activity. The main tourist sites are the villages of Tossens, Burhave, and Eckwarden. There are ferries across the Weser from Nordenham to Bremerhaven and (during summer months) across the Jade from Eckwarderhörne to Wilhelmshaven. In Nordenham there is a train station with several connections per day to Bremen.

== See also ==
- List of peninsulas

== Literature ==
- Klaus Dede: Butjadingen - Portrait einer Landschaft. (1975)
