= Oskar Emil Meyer =

German physicist (1834–1909)

Meyer, 1870–1884

Oskar Emil Meyer (15 October 1834, Varel – 21 April 1909, Breslau) was a German physicist best known for his studies on the viscosity of gases. He was a younger brother to chemist Lothar von Meyer.

== Biography ==
From 1854 he studied sciences at the universities of Heidelberg, Zurich and Königsberg, where he was a student of Franz Ernst Neumann. In 1860 he received his doctorate with a dissertation on the friction between two liquids, titled De mutua duorum fluidorum frictione. In 1864 he succeeded Rudolf Lipschitz as an associate professor at the University of Breslau — teaching classes in mathematics and mathematical physics. During the following year he became a full professor at Breslau, and in 1867 succeeded Moritz Ludwig Frankenheim as director of the Physics Cabinet.

== Published works ==
In 1899 his influential Die kinetische Theorie der Gase. In elementarer Darstellung mit mathematischen Zusätzen was translated into English and published with the title "The kinetic theory of gases; elementary treatise with mathematical appendices". His other noteworthy written efforts are:

- Ueber die Reibung der Flüssigkeiten. Nachtrag, 1863 – On the friction of liquids.
- Vorlesungen über die Theorie der Elasticität der festen Körper und des Lichtäthers, 1885 (by Franz Ernst Neumann, edited by Meyer) – Lectures on the theory of elasticity of solid bodies and luminiferous aether.
- Die Bestimmung der inneren Reibung nach Coulomb's Verfahren, 1887 – On the definition of internal friction according to Coulomb's method.
- Gebirgsmagnetismus, 1889 – Geomagnetism.
