= Jade Bight =

Bay on Germany's North Sea coast

- Jade Bay
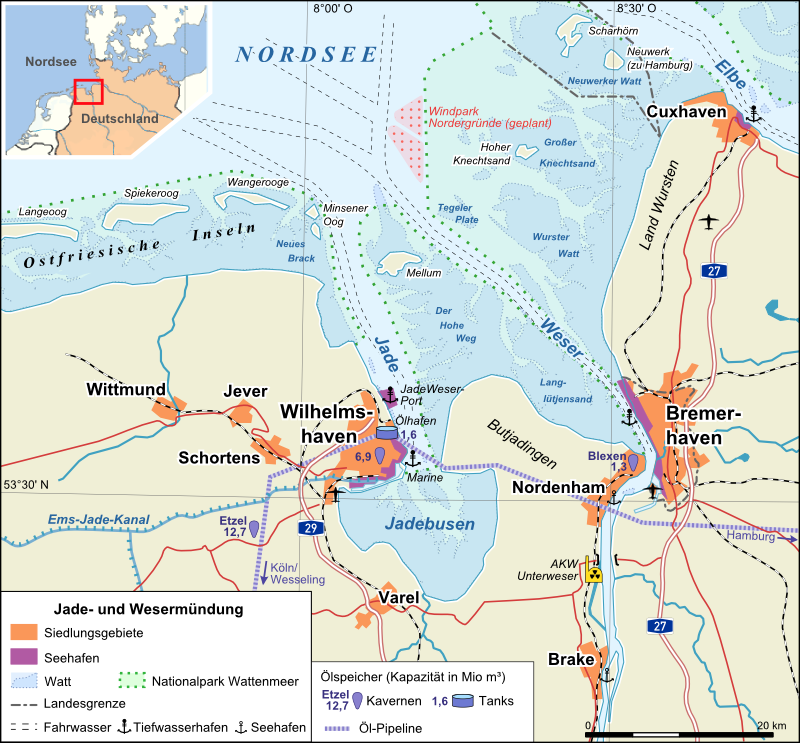
- Map showing Jade Bay (Jadebusen) at lower center
- Interactive map of Jade Bight
- Location: North Sea
- Coordinates: 53°28′N 8°14′E
- River sources: Maade, Jade
- Ocean/sea sources: Atlantic Ocean
- Basin countries: Germany
- Max. width: 16 km (9.9 mi)
- Surface area: 190 km^{2} (73 mi^{2})
- Average depth: 18.5 m (61 ft)

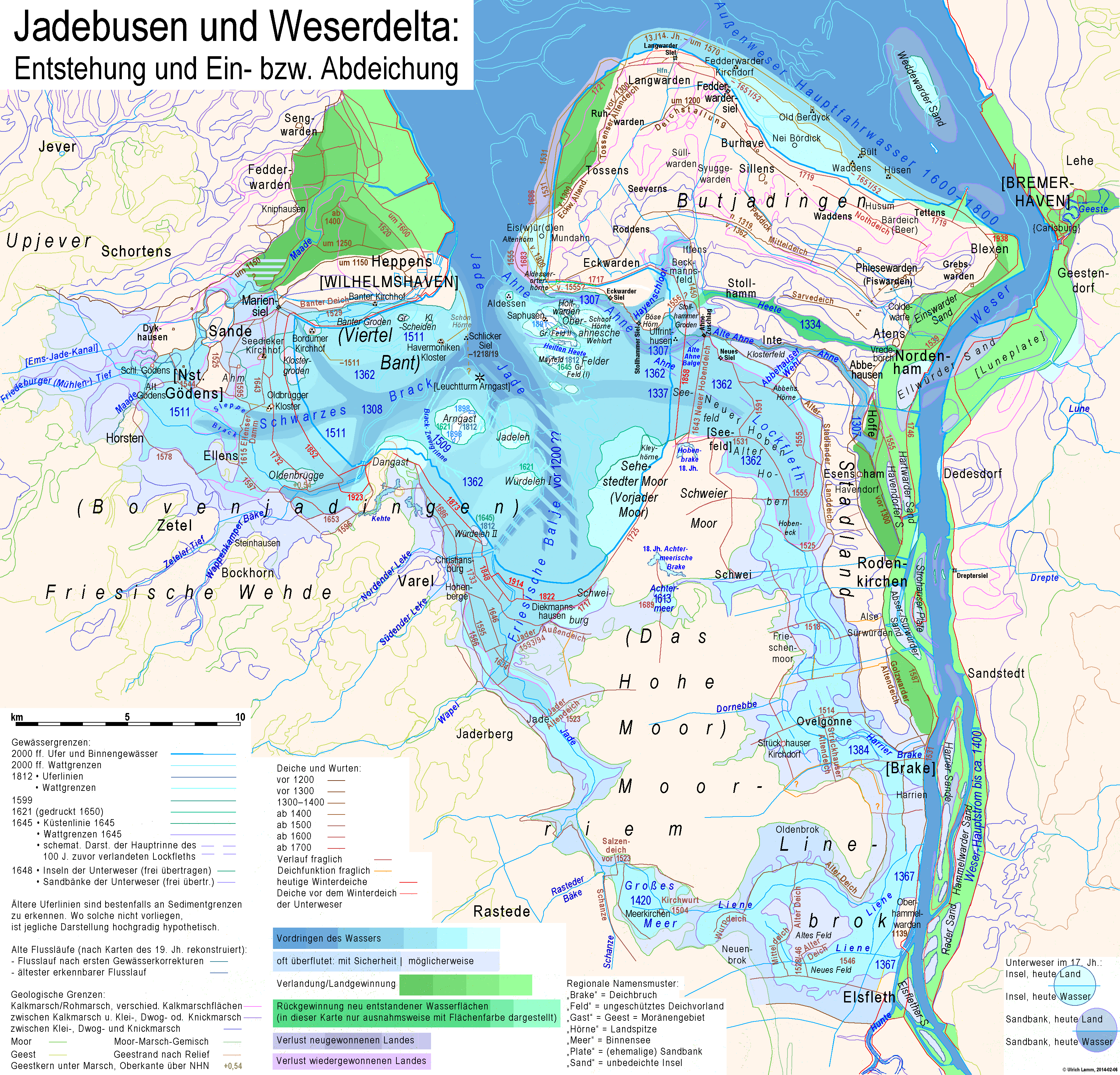
Development of the Jade Bight and the interim Weser delta: • blue areas = advancement of waterbodies • green areas = growth of land • grayish pale blue areas = sometimes flooded • grayish lilac areas = newly gained land lost again • grayish pink areas = regained land lost again • brown to red lines = dikes • bold intensive light blue line = today's coastline • light blue lines = today's limit of mudflats • bold pale blue lines = limit of mudflats c. 1810 • dirty lilac lines = limit of mudflats c. 1645 • light pink to light lilac, ocre and light green lines = geological soil borders. Greenish coloured areas (except the few bluish green ones) represent new won land. Regaining of losses mostly is marked only by the dikes. → This map for reading: • 33 % (216 dpi), • 50 % (144 dpi)

The Jade Bight (also known as Jade Bay; German: Jadebusen, pronounced [ˈjaːdəˌbuːzn̩]) is a bight or bay on the North Sea coast of Germany. It was formerly known simply as (the) Jade or Jahde. Because of the very low input of freshwater, it is classified as a bay rather than an estuary.

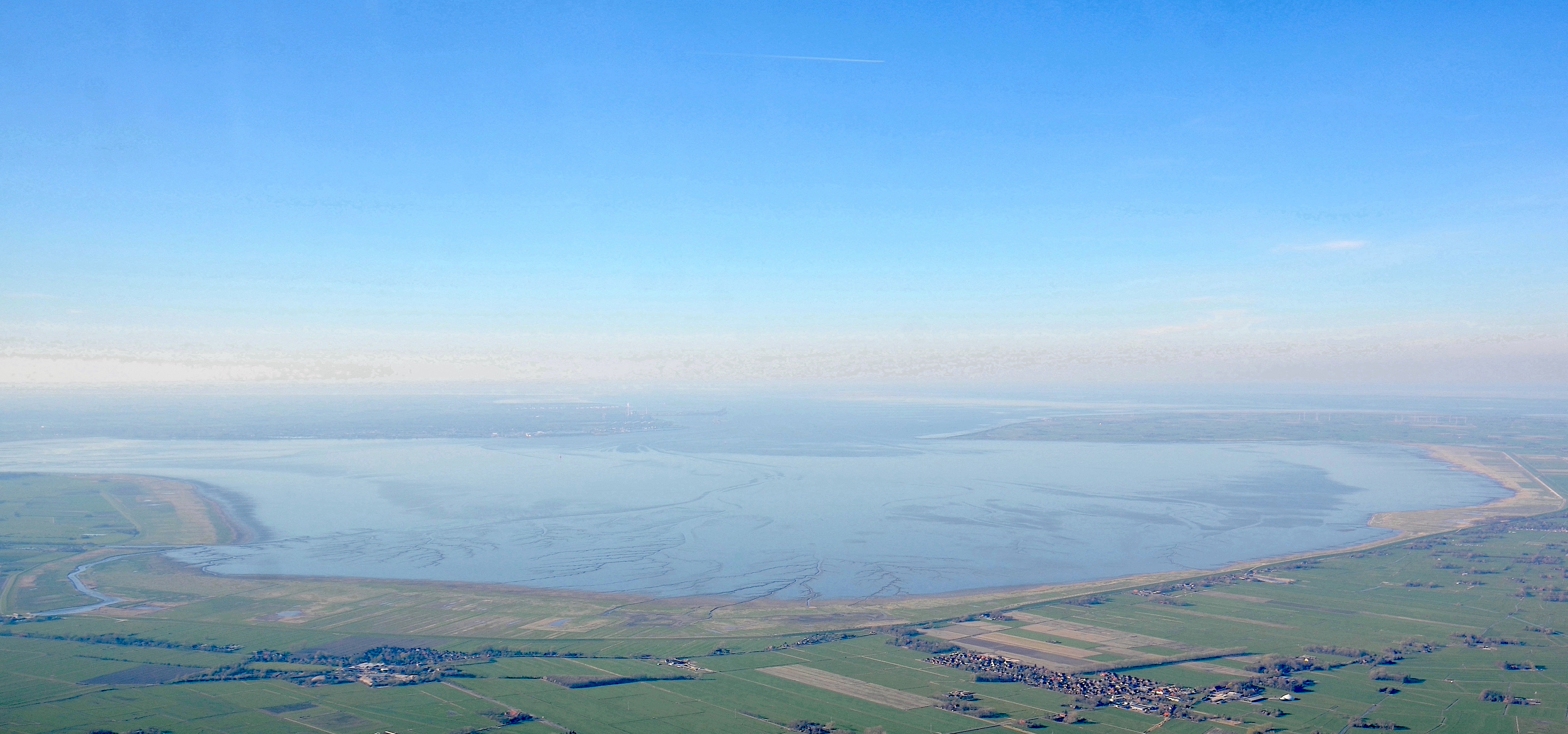
Aerial view of Jade Bight

== Intrusion of the sea ==
About 180 km² (70 mi²) in area, the Jade was largely created by storm floods during the 13th and 16th centuries. Since the early 14th century, it has joined eastward to the estuary of the river Weser. For some time, there were three permanent connecting branches and one flood bed between the river and the bight, forming an estuarine delta. The first of these junctions was closed in 1450 by dikes and the last one in 1515. However, about a century passed before most of the area flooded by these connections was regained for pasture and arable land.

In the west, the Jade extended far into the Frisian peninsula. From the early 16th century, a number of dikes were built against the storm floods and to gain arable land. The main dike, Ellenser Damm, was built between 1596 and 1615 by the County of Oldenburg before the agreement with the objecting County of East Frisia was finished successfully.

== Decay of the Frisian community ==
The extension of Jade Bight and its branches fragmented the free Frisian territory of Rüstringen in Bant in the northwest, most of which has disappeared in the waves, Bovenjadingen ('above the Jade') with the low moraine hills of Friesische Wehde in the southwest, Butjadingen ('outside the Jade') in the northeast, which was an island for almost two centuries, and Stadland ('bank-land'), which became a narrow island along the left bank of the Weser in 1384. The devastation by floods and the losses of land weakened the Frisian community. In the years about 1400, the Free City of Bremen tried to rule Stadland and Butjadingen. At the beginning of the 16th century, all countries around Jade Bight were conquered by the Counts of Oldenburg.

== Organized construction of dikes ==
Together with the conquest of the island of Stadland, the Lockfleth, the largest branch of the Weser delta, was interrupted by a dike at Ovelgönne in 1515. In the next years the water course was cut off at more sites. The most important projects prior to 1650 were the Ellenser Damm across the Schwarzes Brack in the west of the bay in 1596 to 1615 and the New Hoben-Dike in the east in 1643. South of this dike, the coast became a mossy bog. The bog was affected by high floods, and dikes built on the bog proved to be very fragile.

== Harbour ==
Tidal flows make the neck of Jade Bight the deepest natural channel near Germany's North Sea coast. In 1853, the Kingdom of Prussia bought a part of the western shore of the bay from Oldenburg, in order to use the harbour as a Prussian naval base, later called Wilhelmshaven. During World War I, the German High Seas Fleet (Hochseeflotte), the main battle fleet of the Imperial German Navy (Kaiserliche Marine), was based at Wilhelmshaven in the Jade Bight. After World War II, Wilhelmshaven became the main German port for the import of petroleum.

== Nature ==
The foreshore areas of Jade Bight form a part of the German Wadden Sea National Parks.

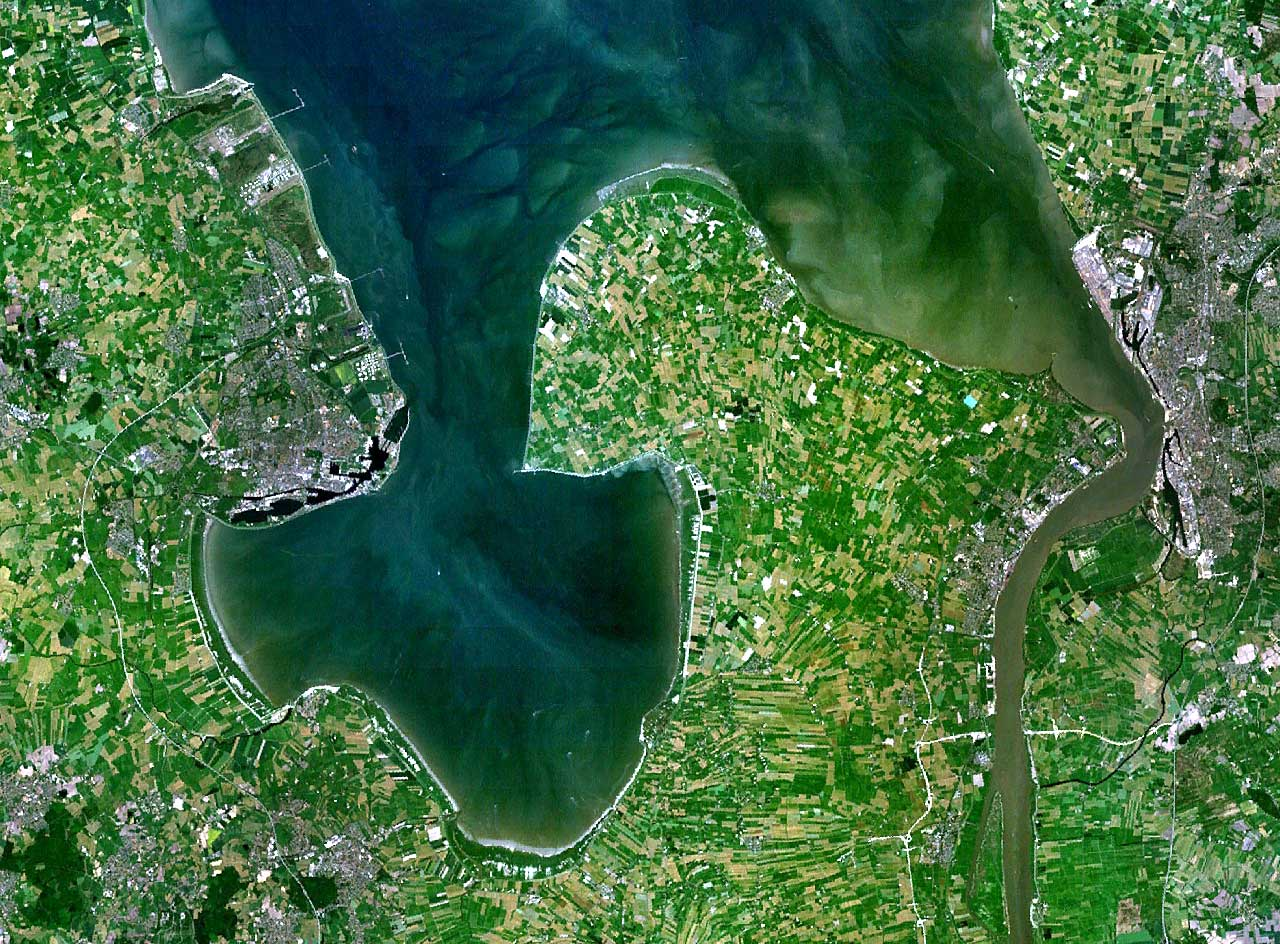
Jadebusen and river Weser estuary

== Sources ==
- Karl-Ernst Behre: Die Geschichte der Landschaft um den Jadebusen, Brune-Mettker GmbH, Wilhelmshaven 2012, ISBN 978-3-941929-02-9
- Karl-Ernst Behre: Das Moor von Sehestedt − Landschaftsgeschichte am östlichen Jadebusen. Vol. 21 of the Reihe Oldenburger Forschungen
- David Blackbourn: The Conquest of Nature: Water, Landscape, and the Making of Modern Germany (2006)
- Eilert Schimmelpenning: Der Jadebusen und das Schwarze Brack, Schortens, 2004, ISBN 3-936691-21-5
- More texts and linked historical maps, see list of sources of the map "Jadebusen und Weserdelta"
