= Klaus Dede =

German journalist and writer (1935–2018)

- Born: 1 June 1935; Nordenham, Free State of Oldenburg
- Died: 5 May 2018 (aged 82); Oldenburg, Lower Saxony, Germany
- Occupations: Writer; journalist

Klaus Dede (1 June 1935 in Nordenham, Oldenburg – 5 May 2018, Oldenburg) was a German writer and journalist.

== Life ==
Dede was born 1935 in Nordenham-Blexen. His father was a Lutheran priest. After school Dede studied during the 1950s. Later Dede worked as a newspaper reporter in Papenburg, Gütersloh and Nordenham. Dede wrote several books over local history in northern part of Lower-Saxony (Butjadingen, Oldenburg, Bremerhaven, Stedingen, Jade, Wesermarsch) and a book about Jesus Jesus – schwul?, Die Kirchen, die Christen und die Liebe (translated "Was Jesus gay?"). Dede lived in Oldenburg.

== Works by Dede ==
- 1975: Butjadingen – Portrait einer Landschaft. Fischerhude
- 1975: Oldenburg und Ammerland
- 1976: Bremerhaven und Wursten
- 1976: Stedingen Ein Land, das nicht sein durfte. Fischerhude
- 1978: An der Jade
- 1979: Hermann Tempel. Leer
- 1980: Der kleine Oldenburger
- 1981: Fritz Mackensen. Der Entdecker Worpswedes
- 1981: Vom Moppenmann und anderen Leuten. Anekdoten aus dem Oldenburgischen
- 1982: Wesermarsch. Ein Heimatbuch
- 1986: Helene Brauer: Am Staugraben
- 1987: "... mein Oldenburg
- 1987: Antisemitismus in Oldenburg
- 1989: Die missbrauchte Hymne
- 1989: Helene Brauer-Dede: Frau Pastor
- 1990: Kategorie V: unbelastet. August Hinrichs und die Oldenburgische Landschaft
- 1990: Jesus war schwul. Die Kirche, die Christen und die Liebe
- 1992: Alkoholabstinenz als Ziel schulischer Prävention. Ein Disput zwischen Klaus Dede und Rüdiger Meyenberg
- 1993: Vom Rausch. Bibliographische Hinweise auf die Literatur der Abstinenz- und Temperenzbewegung in der Epoche des deutschen Nationalismus
- 1999: Butjadingen. Landschaft, Kultur, Informationen. Fischerhude
- 2005: Gegen den Konsens. Oldenburg
- 2006: Jesus - schwul?, Die Kirchen, die Christen und die Liebe
- 2009: Von böser Lust und rechter Freudigkeit
