= Berne station (Bremen S-Bahn) =

Railway station in Berne, Germany

Berne
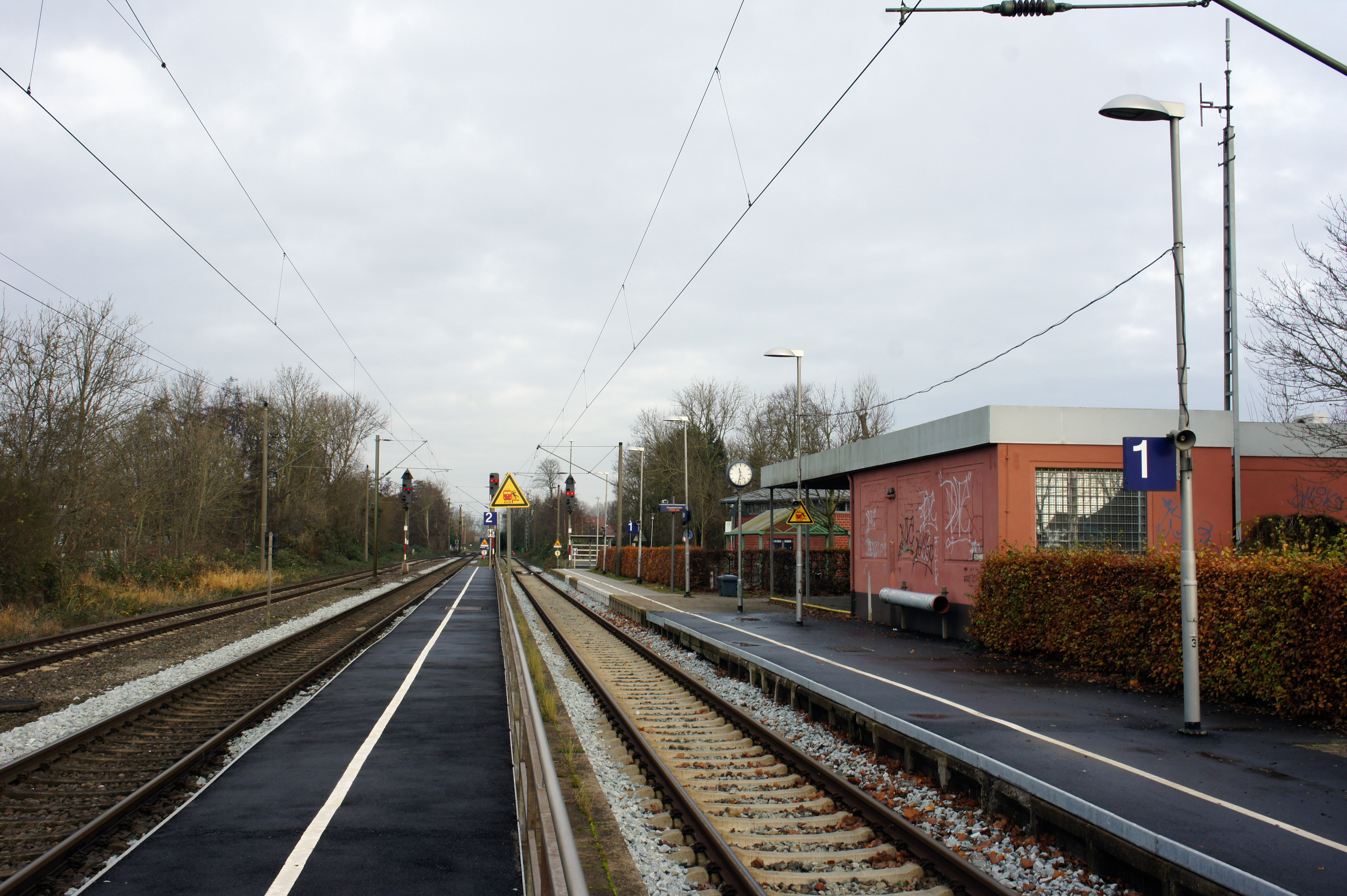
- Berne railway station

General information
- Location: Berne, Lower Saxony; Germany
- Coordinates: 53.1838°N 8.4754°E
- Line: Hude-Blexen railway
- Platforms: 2
- Tracks: 2

Other information
- Station code: 0577
- DS100 code: HBER
- Category: 6
- Fare zone: VBN: 820

Services
Preceding station	Bremen S-Bahn	Following station
Elsfleth towards Nordenham	RS4	Hude towards Bremen Hbf
Location

Berne (German: Bahnhof Berne) is a railway station located in Berne, Germany. The station is located on the Hude-Blexen railway. The train services are operated by NordWestBahn. The station has been part of the Bremen S-Bahn since December 2010.

== Train services ==
The following services currently call at the station:

- Bremen S-Bahn services RS 4 Nordenham - Hude - Delmenhorst - Bremen
