= Brake, Lower Saxony =

Brake
- Town
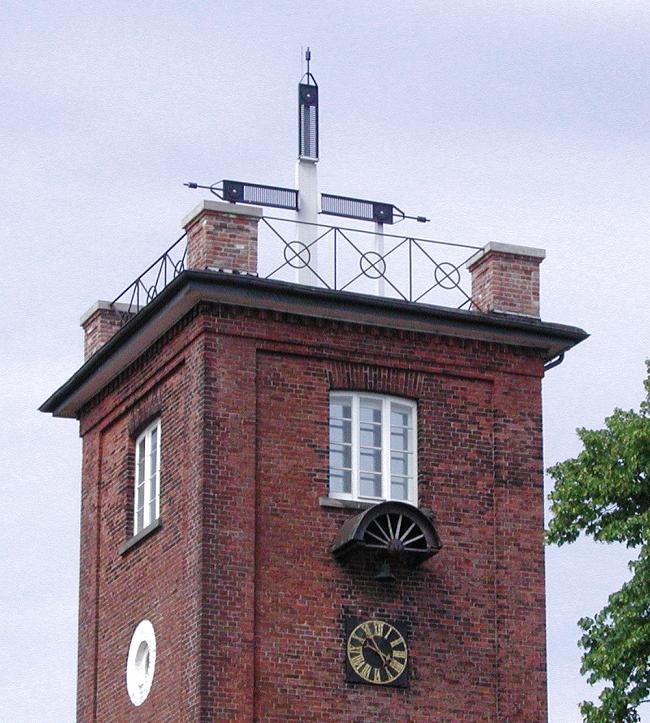
- "Telegraph" in Brake

- Coat of arms

- Location of Brake within Wesermarsch district
- Interactive map of Brake
- Location within Germany Location within Lower Saxony
- Coordinates: 53°20′N 8°29′E
- Country: Germany
- State: Lower Saxony
- District: Wesermarsch

Government
  - Mayor (2026–31): Jaqueline Günther (Greens)

Area
  - Total: 38.3 km^{2} (14.8 sq mi)
- Elevation: 3 m (9.8 ft)

Population (2025-12-31)
  - Total: 15,144
  - Density: 395/km^{2} (1,020/sq mi)
- Time zone: UTC+01:00 (CET)
  - Summer (DST): UTC+02:00 (CEST)
- Postal codes: 26919
- Dialling codes: 04401
- Vehicle registration: BRA
- Website: www.brake.de

Brake (German pronunciation: [ˈbʁaːkə]; Low German: Broak) is the district seat of Wesermarsch district in northern Germany.

== Geography ==
Brake lies in the centre of the square formed by Bremerhaven, Bremen, Oldenburg and Wilhelmshaven. With its position up from the North Sea on the lower Weser, which can accommodate ocean-going ships, its proximity to Autobahnen A29 and A27 as well as to Bremen Airport, this port city has a favourable infrastructure supporting land, sea, and air travel. Moreover, railway lines leading to Nordenham and Oldenburg/Bremen fill out the city's transport connections.

With the Weser tunnel to the north, which was opened to road traffic in January 2004, Brake was given even better connections to the region's Autobahn network. However, since cyclists and pedestrians may not use the tunnel, and since the ferry service across the river Weser was cut back after the tunnel's opening, those on bicycles or on foot suffer a distinct disadvantage to their mobility in the region.

== History ==
The term "Brake" first cropped up in the 14th century when an unsealed break in a dike led to flooding in the Harrier area. The actual documentary mention, dating from 25 to 30 May 1384, says "brake to Harghen (Harrien)". By the 17th century, "Brake" was ever more often being used not simply as the word for the old dikeburst, but as the community's name. From that time come the names Braksiel and Harrierbrake.

In 1731, the old Fischerhaus, Brake's oldest maintained house, was built. In 1756 came Brake's first documentary mention as a port city. During the 19th century, Brake became an important industrial centre for shipping, and the port facilities along the Weser were further expanded. In 1814, Brake set up its first council, Amt Brake. In 1835, Brake was declared a free port. In 1846, the telegraph was set up to relay shipping news between Bremen and Bremerhaven. In 1848–52 Brake was the first base of the German Imperial Fleet under Admiral Karl Rudolf Brommy, the first ever commander of a unified German fleet.

On 1 May 1856, Brake was raised to city, and furthermore Golzwarden and Hammelwarden were becoming established as communities (from 1913 onwards becoming parts of the City of Brake). In 1861, the river port was brought into operation. In 1873 came Brake's connection to the railway network. In 1892, the pier was built. In 1936 – the National Socialists had taken power in Germany by this time – the Admiral Brommy Barracks were built for the German Navy. The barracks were not destroyed in World War II, so the buildings could be used as home for refugees from the former Eastern provinces of Germany.

In 1960, the Shipping Museum was dedicated. In 1972 the Culture and Sport Centre with its city swimming pool and great sports hall came into service. In 1974, building began on the District Professional School Centre (Kreisberufsschulzentrum), and the communities of Golzwarden and Schmalenfleth were amalgamated into Brake.

In 1996, the Admiral Brommy Barracks were closed and most buildings were broke down to get a new area for the harbour expansion.

In 2006, Brake celebrated 150 years as a city.

== Politics ==
Three groupings are represented on Brake City Council, the Social Democratic Party of Germany/Unabhängige Wählergemeinschaft (non-aligned citizens' coalition) or SDP/UWG, the Christian Democratic Union/Free Democratic Party or CDU/FDP, and a WGB (Wählergemeinschaft Brake or Brake Voters' Community) faction. The SDP/UWG grouping currently holds the majority of seats. Mayor Uta Maron, herself an independent, became Brake's first woman mayor in May 2000.

Seat distribution

- SPD: 17 – Factional chairman Dieter Lohstroh
- CDU: 9 – Factional chairman Claus Plachetka
- FDP: 2 – Factional chairman Gustav Hellmers
- WGB: 3 – Factional chairman Walter Erfmann
- UWG: 1 – Tede Tedsen
- Mayor: 1

== Sightseeing ==
Brake's landmark is the "Telegraph", built in 1846 under the Oldenburg Grand Duke Paul Friedrich August as an integral part of an optical telegraph line between Bremen and Bremerhaven.

Since 1960, the headquarters of the Shipping Museum of the Oldenburg Weser ports has housed exhibition pieces of the "Telegraph" on seven floors in all, which stand as a valuable document in the shipping history of Oldenburg's Lower Weser area.

Ship portraits, ship models, figureheads, sea charts, nautical instruments, and souvenirs brought from overseas are interesting witnesses to a long bygone time, and bring the epoch of the windjammer captains back to life. Bits of the Pamir shipwreck recall the time when that ship capsized and sank in a hurricane.

In an old salesman's and shipowner's house built in 1808, right near the "Telegraph", the second part of the Shipping Museum's collection has been housed. Here the visitor will find a complete shipping supply shop from the turn of the 20th century, a sailmaker's workshop, an old shipping company branch office, and Admiral Rudolf Brommy's livingroom. Those interested in shipping and nautical history will find in these two buildings a collection such as is seldom brought together.

== Navy ==
Brake was for a long time an important centre for training the Navy's sailors. At the Admiral Brommy Barracks built in 1936, seamen and junior officers were readied for duty on board ship. After the war, it was primarily here that conscripts in the so-called "Heizerberufen" ("fireman conscripts") underwent basic training. This applied to Verwendungsreihen (≈ occupational specialities) 42 (drive system technicians), 43 (electrical technicians), and 44 (ship's operation technicians).

In 1996, the whole training operation moved to the newly built Navy Technical School in Parow, which since then has come to include all the Navy's technical units up to ship's safety technicians (Neustadt) and the Navy Operations School (Bremerhaven). The Admiral Brommy Barracks were torn down in 2000.

== Economy ==
Brake's location on a deepwater waterway such as the Weser was the deciding factor in the town's development and its harbour's competitiveness.

The harbour was shaped by its function as a trade centre for traditional bulk cargoes such as cereals, feed and manure, sulphur, as well as general goods such as wood, paper, iron and steel. Furthermore, trade was further bolstered by project loading, packaged goods and heavy cargo as well as containerized freight, giving the port a further focus of activity.

Today, Brake Harbour can handle ships with an 11.90 m draught and up to 45,000 tonnes deadweight (DWT). In the tideless inner harbour, LASH barges, coasters and inland-going barges are readied for European traffic. Barges regularly undertake extensive cargo runs on all Europe's waterways, to and from Brake. it is mainly used by J. Müller.

In 2003, roughly 5.27 million tonnes of goods were handled. When barge traffic is counted, this reaches 6.28 million tonnes.

In 2004, the harbour, which up to this time had been freely accessible, was completely fenced in owing to international agreements. The north strait was closed to public traffic, and together with the old Navy school lands, added to the harbour area, which may now be entered only by authorized persons.

The district seat of Brake, with its roughly 16,300 inhabitants is a lively regional centre and the seat of many authorities.

For about 50,000 inhabitants in the commuter area (of 90,000 all together in Wesermarsch district) Brake moreover fulfils all service functions. These include a broad array of healthcare services, many public institutions and manifold cultural offerings.

As the Wesermarsch education hub, Brake has at its disposal all schools of higher learning. These opportunities are fulfilled by the nearby universities and technical colleges in Bremerhaven, Bremen, Oldenburg and Wilhelmshaven.

For those interested in sports, there are indoor and outdoor swimming pools and tennis courts.

== Notable people ==
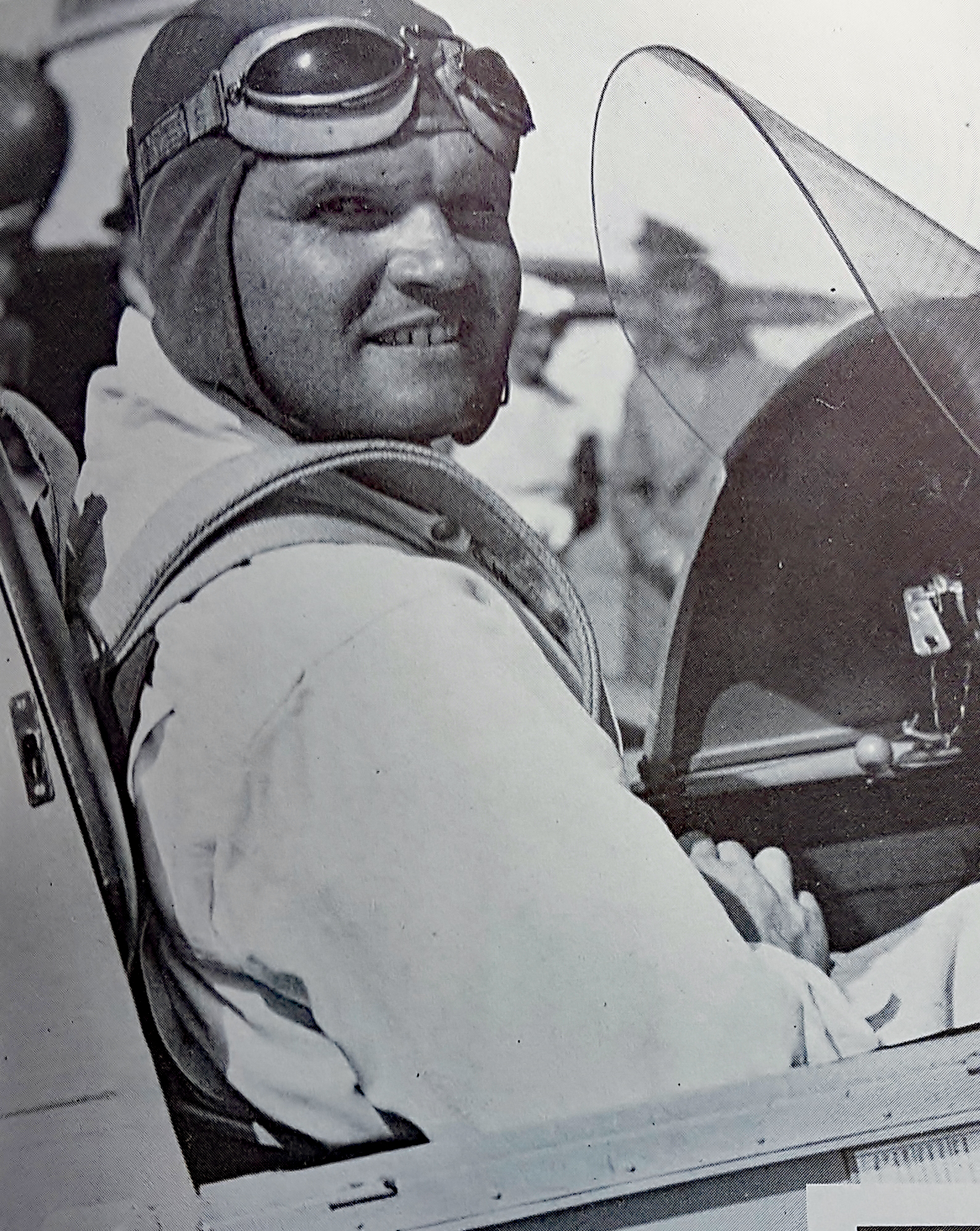
Gerd Achgelis

- Arp Schnitger: (1648–1719), well known organ builders; received a patent as royally privileged organ builder.
- Karl Rudolf Brommy, (1804–1860), Admiral of the first German fleet (Reichsflotte in Brake, 1848–1852).
- Eduard Scheve, (DE Wiki), (1836–1909), founder of Evangelical Free Church Deaconry and Foreign
- Georg von der Vring, (DE Wiki) (1889–1968), painter and drawing teacher; wrote poems and tales; honorary citizen of Brake and buried locally.
- Wilhelm Meendsen-Bohlken (1897–1985), naval officer, Vice-Admiral in WWII, ship commander
- Gerd Achgelis (1908–1991), aviator, test pilot, helicopter pioneer
- Lutz Ackermann, (DE Wiki) (born 1945), journalist, moderator at Norddeutscher Rundfunk.
- Helmut Debus, (DE Wiki) (born 1949), Low German songwriter; grew up locally
- Björn Thümler (born 1970), politician (CDU)
- Dimo Wache (born 1973), footballer, played 374 games
