= Wesermarsch =

District in Lower Saxony, Germany

Coordinates: 53°20′N 8°20′E

- District
- Flag Coat of arms
- Country: Germany
- State: Lower Saxony
- Capital: Brake

Government
  - District admin.: Stephan Siefken

Area
  - Total: 821.87 km^{2} (317.33 sq mi)

Population (31 December 2022)
  - Total: 89,568
  - Density: 110/km^{2} (280/sq mi)
- Time zone: UTC+01:00 (CET)
  - Summer (DST): UTC+02:00 (CEST)
- Vehicle registration: BRA
- Website: landkreis-wesermarsch.de

Wesermarsch is a Kreis (district) in the northwestern part of Lower Saxony, Germany. Neighboring are (from the east clockwise) the districts of Cuxhaven and Osterholz, the city of Bremen in the state Free Hanseatic City of Bremen, the urban district of Delmenhorst, the district of Oldenburg and the urban district of Oldenburg, and the districts of Ammerland and Friesland.

== Geography ==
The district is located on the western banks of the River Weser between Bremen and the river's mouth. Several rivers cross the district from west to east, the largest being the Hunte, which runs through Oldenburg before entering Wesermarsch. In the north, the Weser mouth and the Jade Bight (a bay off the North Sea) enclose the Butjadingen peninsula. The district's largest town is located here: Nordenham, which lies opposite Bremerhaven at the Weser mouth.

== History ==
The district was created in 1933 by merging the Ämter of Butjadingen, Brake and Elsfleth, and parts of the Ämter of Delmenhorst and Varel.

== Partnerships ==
Since February 1991, the district has partnered with the German districts of Borken (North Rhine-Westphalia) and Ludwigslust (Mecklenburg-Vorpommern). A partnership with the English Borough of Havant has existed for several decades already, and in 1989 a partnership with the Russian city of Voronezh was established.

== Coat of arms ==
The coat of arms shows the red and yellow bars of the state of Oldenburg in its left half. In the bottom right a warrior is depicted, symbolizing the Frisian tribes which originally settled in the area. The ship in the top right is a cog, the typical trading ship of the area in medieval times. It symbolizes the long trading tradition at the mouth of the River Weser.

== Towns and municipalities ==
Clickable map of municipalities in the district

Cities
1. Brake
2. Elsfleth
3. Nordenham
Municipalities
1. Berne
2. Butjadingen
3. Lemwerder
4. Jade
5. Ovelgönne
6. Stadland

== Literature ==
- Klaus Dede: Wesermarsch. Ein Heimatbuch. (1982)
