= Ovelgönne =

- Municipality
- Location of Ovelgönne within Wesermarsch district
- Interactive map of Ovelgönne
- Location within Germany Location within Lower Saxony
- Coordinates: 53°21′N 8°24′E
- Country: Germany
- State: Lower Saxony
- District: Wesermarsch
- Subdivisions: 4 districts

Government
  - Mayor (2021–26): Sascha Stolorz (CDU)

Area
  - Total: 124.27 km^{2} (47.98 sq mi)
- Elevation: 4 m (13 ft)

Population (2025-12-31)
  - Total: 5,446
  - Density: 43.82/km^{2} (113.5/sq mi)
- Time zone: UTC+01:00 (CET)
  - Summer (DST): UTC+02:00 (CEST)
- Postal codes: 26939
- Dialling codes: 04480
- Vehicle registration: BRA
- Website: www.ovelgoenne.de

Ovelgönne (German pronunciation: [ˈoːfl̩ˌɡœnə]) is a municipality in the district of Wesermarsch, in Lower Saxony, Germany. It is situated approximately 27 km northeast of Oldenburg, and 40 km northwest of Bremen. The municipality of Ovelgönne has its administration in the village of Oldenbrok and not in the homonymous village of Ovelgönne.

== History ==
Ovelgönne has its origins in the "Oevelgünne" fortress which was constructed by Count Johann V of Oldenburg (1482–1526) at the end of June 1514 in order to enforce his rule over the surrounding area.

In 1583, Ovelgönne was given additional fortifications. From 1628 to 1631, Imperial Troops were quartered at Ovelgönne during the Thirty Years' War.
