= Stadland =

- Municipality
- Coat of arms

- Location of Stadland within Wesermarsch district
- Interactive map of Stadland
- Location within Germany Location within Lower Saxony
- Coordinates: 53°23′N 8°23′E
- Country: Germany
- State: Lower Saxony
- District: Wesermarsch

Government
  - Mayor (2021–26): Harald Stindt (Ind.)

Area
  - Total: 114.14 km^{2} (44.07 sq mi)
- Elevation: 1 m (3.3 ft)

Population (2025-12-31)
  - Total: 7,524
  - Density: 65.92/km^{2} (170.7/sq mi)
- Time zone: UTC+01:00 (CET)
  - Summer (DST): UTC+02:00 (CEST)
- Postal codes: 26935, 26936, 26937
- Dialling codes: 04732 (Rodenkirchen), 04737 (Schwei), 04734 (Seefeld), 04731 (Kleinensiel)
- Vehicle registration: BRA
- Website: www.stadland.de

Stadland (German pronunciation: [ˈʃtatlant]) is a municipality in the district of Wesermarsch, in Lower Saxony, Germany. It is situated on the left bank of the Weser, approx. 32 km northeast of Oldenburg, and 42 km northwest of Bremen. On the west side Stadland bordered to the Jade Bight. Its seat is in the village Rodenkirchen, which is also part of this municipality as the villages Schwei, Seefeld and Kleinensiel. There are also many little Bauernschaften (hamlets) in Stadland.

In 1974 Stadland was built in cause of the Niedersächsische Gemeindereform. The former municipalities Rodenkirchen, Schwei and Seefeld and also Kleinensiel, a part of the former municipality Esenshamm (now: Nordenham) were built up to the new municipality Stadland.

== Division of the municipality ==
- Rodenkirchen is with approx. 4,000 inhabitants the largest place of the municipality as well as training and sports center and seat of the local administration. Each year at the end of September the Roonkarker Mart, a funfair take place and attract many visitors.
- Schwei has got round about 1,500 inhabitants. Among the former municipality Schwei rank the Bauernschaften Norderschwei, Kötermoor, Süderschwei, Schweieraußendeich, Schweieraltendeich, Schweierfeld and Schwei-West.
- Seefeld was built in 1643 in cause of building dikes and land reclamation. The place is particularly coined by the agriculture. The cultural center forms the Seefelder Mühle, a windmill, the landmark of the place, where over 50 meetings take place annually.
- Kleinensiel with approx. 800 inhabitants is the smallest village of the municipality. In the media is the place admits by the close convenient nuclear power station Unterweser. In 2004 the Wesertunnel was finished. The next firm land traversing across the Weser is not before Bremen.

== Partnership ==
Stadland has a Partnership with the District du Petit Caux (Normandy, France). This partnership is affirmed by mutual attendance of grades and private people in each year.

== Personalities ==
- Alma Rogge, German writer
- Amanda Jürgens, German writer
- Franz Radziwill, German painter
- Jakob Schipper, German-Austrian philologist

== Gallery ==
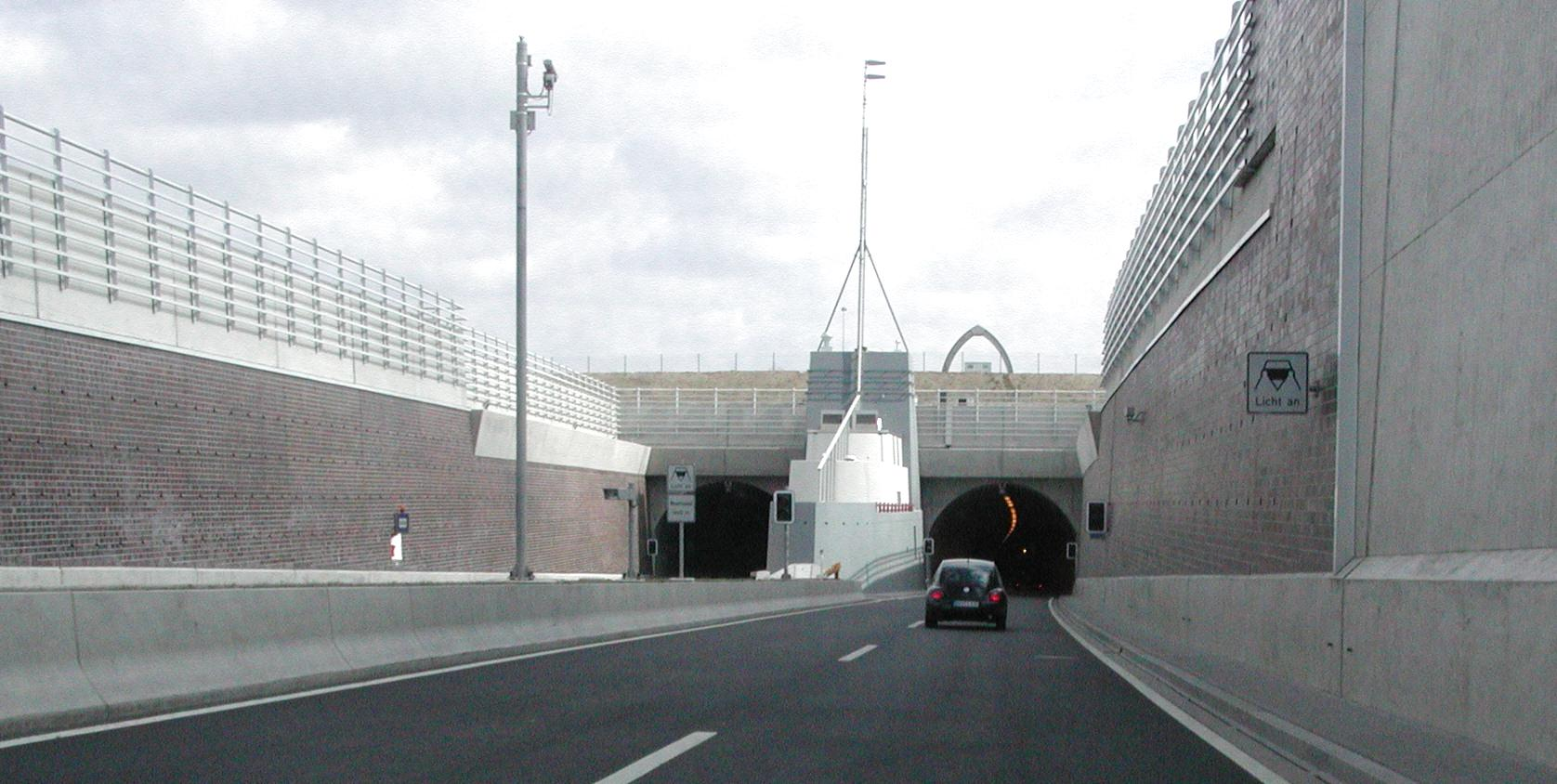
Tunnel of the Weser River (Kleinensiel)

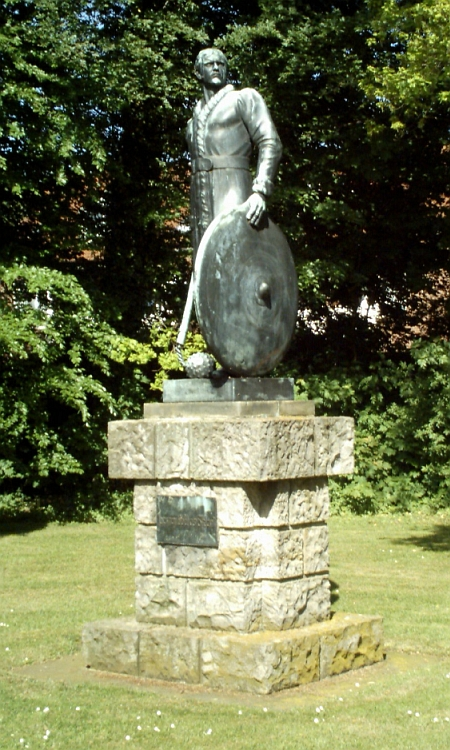
Friesendenkmal - Monument in Rodenkirchen

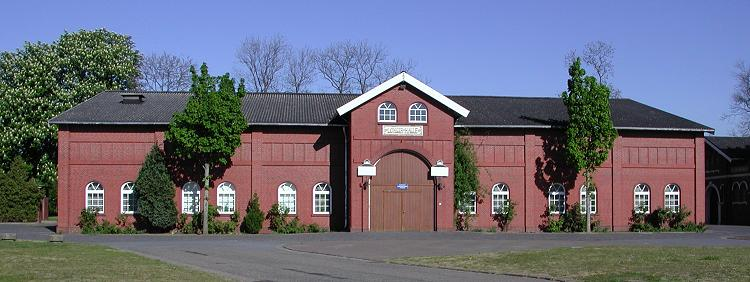
Markthalle in Rodenkirchen

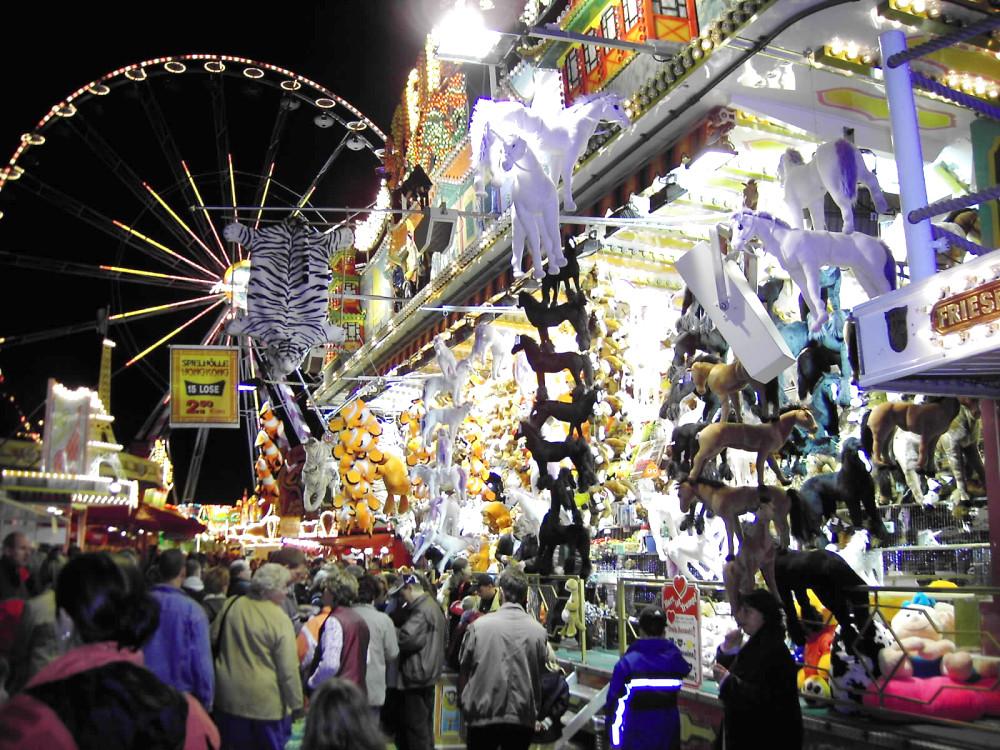
Roonkarker Mart, a yearly funfair in Rodenkirchen at the end of September
