= Jade (river) =

River in Germany

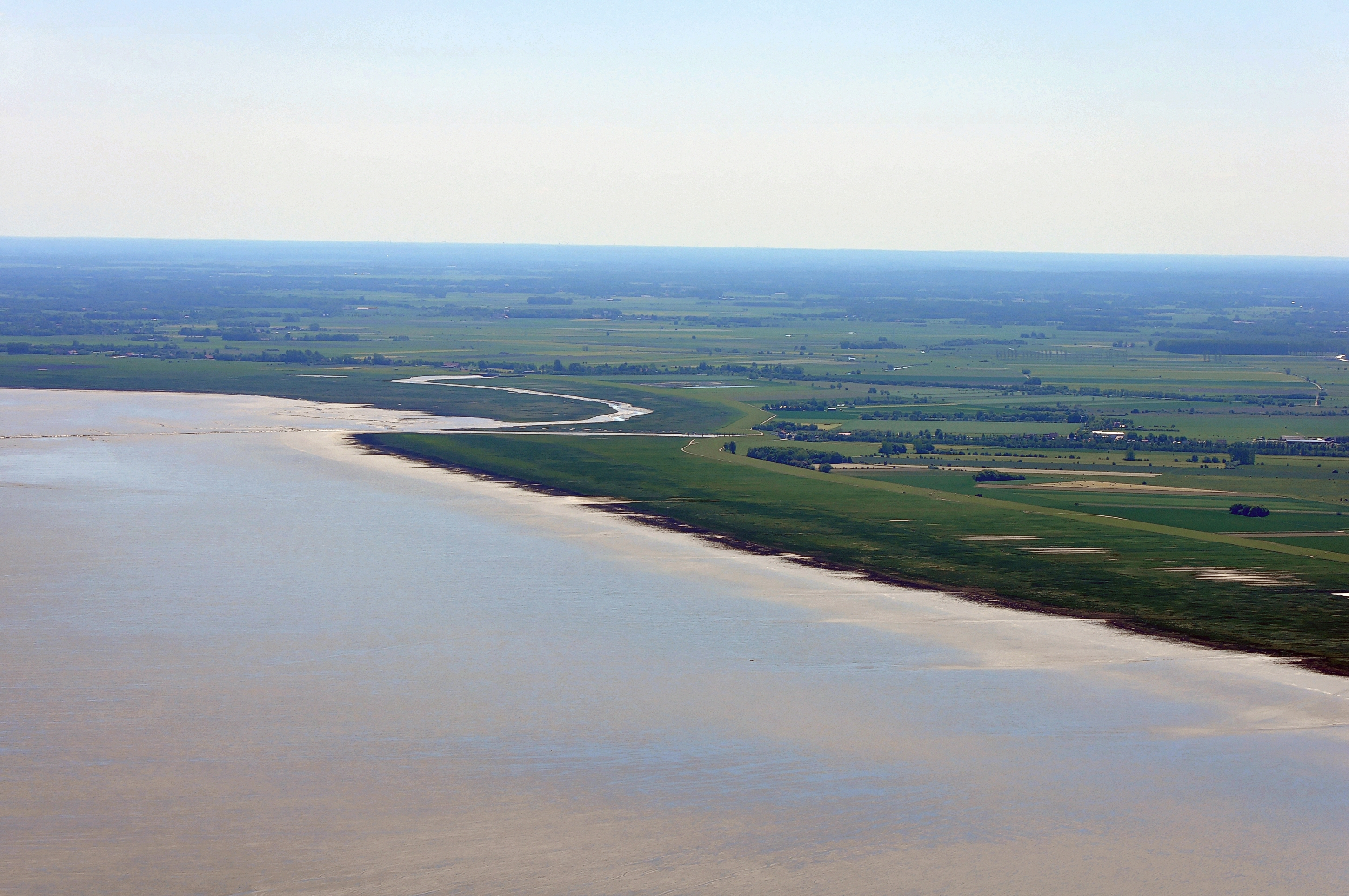
- Jade flowing into the North sea

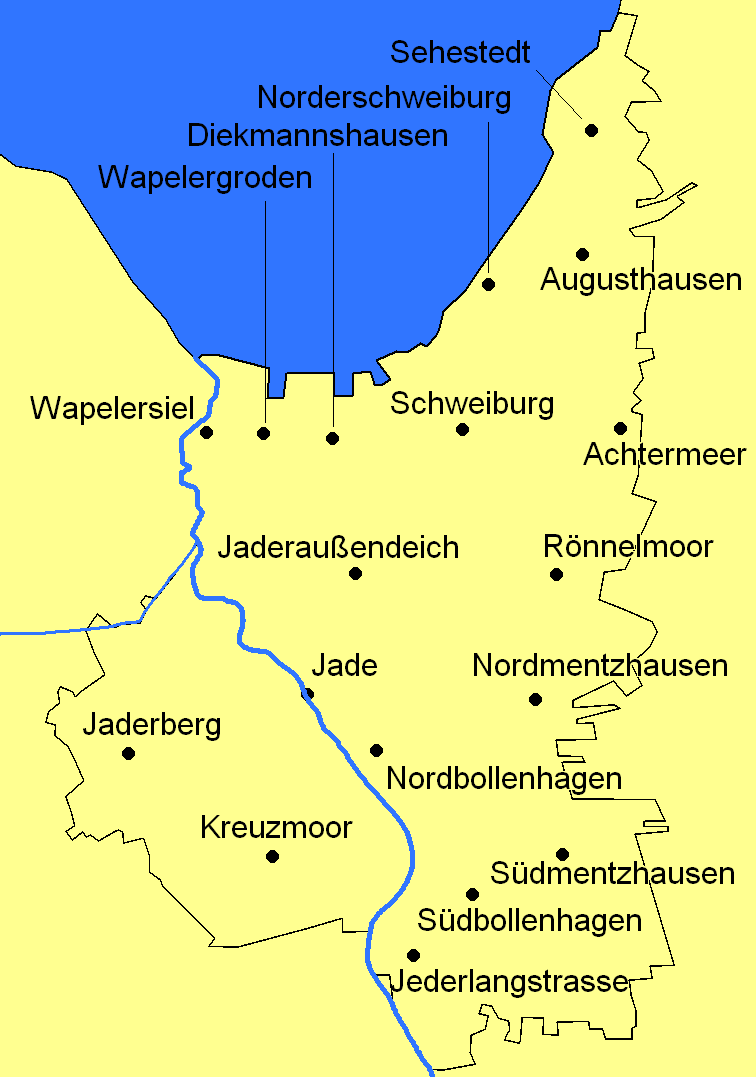

Location
- Country: Germany
- State: Lower Saxony

Physical characteristics
- Mouth
  - location: North Sea
  - coordinates: 53°20′07″N 8°14′35″E
- Length: 29.7 km (18.5 mi)
- Basin size: 215 km^{2} (83 sq mi)

The Jade (German pronunciation: [ˈjaːdə]; in its upper course: Geestrandtief) is a 30 km (19 mi) long river in Lower Saxony, northwestern Germany. Rising near Oldenburg, it flows into the Jade Bight, a bay of the North Sea, near Varel.

== Literature ==
- Klaus Dede: An der Jade (1978) (in German)

== See also ==
- Jade Bight
- List of rivers of Lower Saxony
