= Nordenham =

Town in Lower Saxony, Germany

- Town
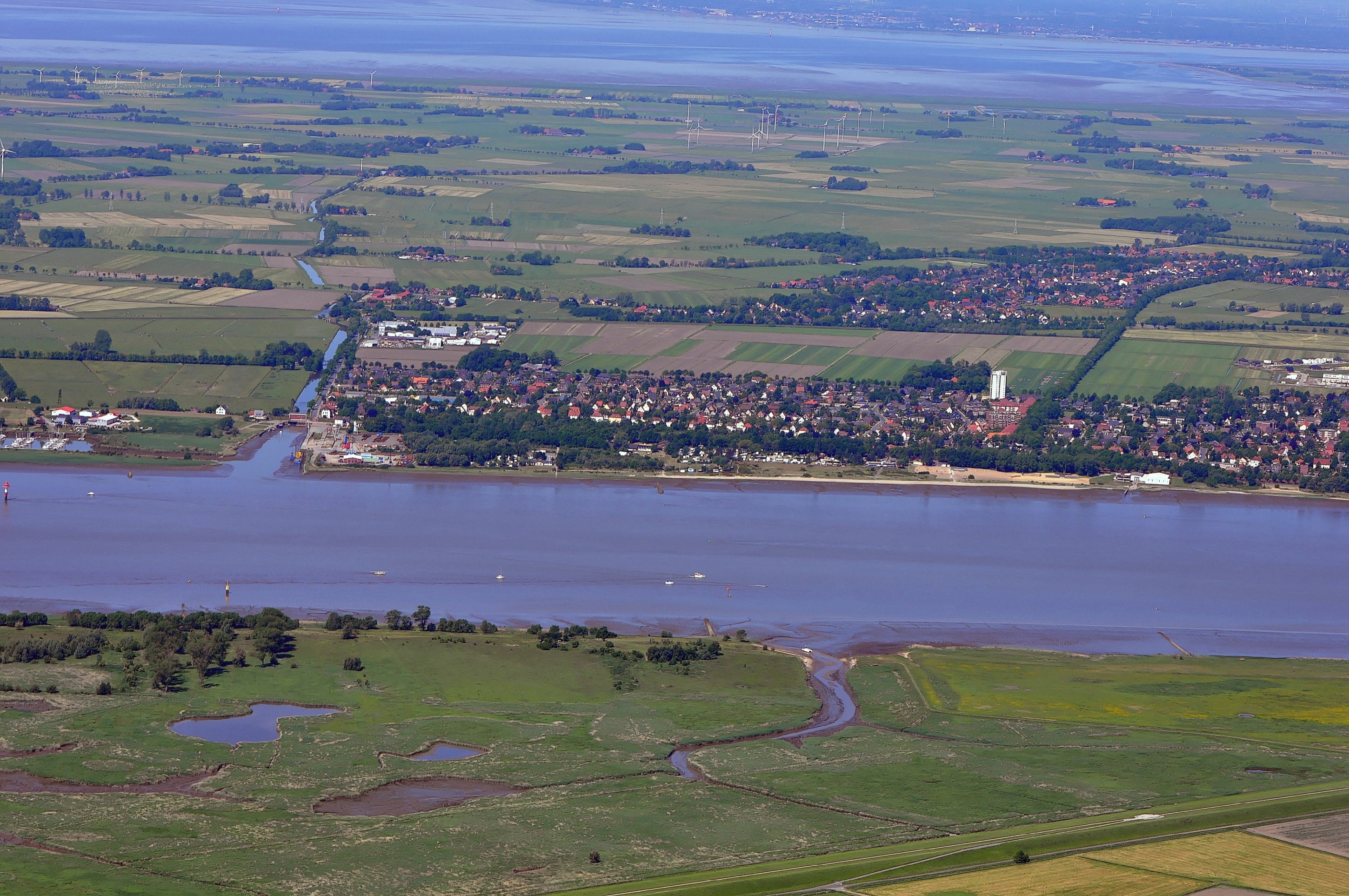
- Aerial view of Nordenham and the Weser river

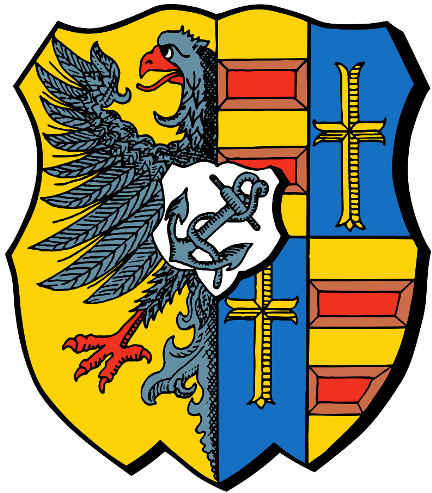
- Coat of arms

- Location of Nordenham within Wesermarsch district
- Interactive map of Nordenham
- Location within Germany Location within Lower Saxony
- Coordinates: 53°30′N 8°28′E
- Country: Germany
- State: Lower Saxony
- District: Wesermarsch
- Subdivisions: 35 districts (Dorfs)

Government
  - Mayor (2021–26): Nils Siemen (SPD)

Area
  - Total: 87.77 km^{2} (33.89 sq mi)
- Elevation: 2 m (6.6 ft)

Population (2025-12-31)
  - Total: 25,759
  - Density: 293.5/km^{2} (760.1/sq mi)
- Time zone: UTC+01:00 (CET)
  - Summer (DST): UTC+02:00 (CEST)
- Postal codes: 26954
- Dialling codes: 04731
- Vehicle registration: BRA
- Website: www.nordenham.de

Nordenham (German pronunciation: [nɔʁdn̩ˈham]) is a town in the Wesermarsch district, in Lower Saxony, Germany. It is located at the mouth (on the west bank) of the Weser river on the Butjadingen peninsula on the coast of the North Sea. The seaport city of Bremerhaven is located on the other side (east bank) of the river. The Midgard-seaport in Nordenham is the largest private-owned harbor in Germany.

== Geography ==
=== Geographical location ===
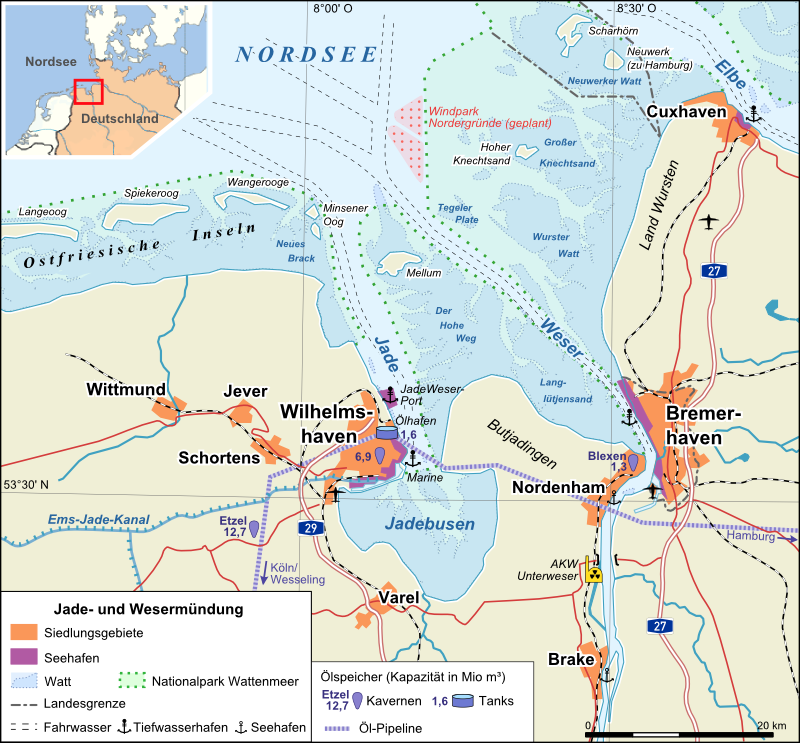
Nordenham on the banks of the Weser

Nordenham is located on the West Bank of the Weser River across from Bremerhaven along the river's mouth at the North Sea, north of the cities of Bremen and Oldenburg. The local environment is mainly marshland, specifically Marsch oder Schwemmland.

=== Boroughs ===
Nordenham is composed of 35 dorfs, each of which with a history as a separate community: Abbehausen, Abbehauser Groden, Abbehauser Hörne, Abbehauserwisch, Atens, Atenserfeld, Blexen, Blexersande, Blexerwurp, Bulterweg, Butterburg, Einswarden, Ellwürden, Enjebuhr, Esenshamm, Esenshammer Altendeich, Esenshammer Oberdeich, Esenshammergroden, Friedrich-August-Hütte, Grebswarden, Großensiel, Havendorf, Heering, Hoffe, Kloster, Moorseersand, Oberdeich, Phiesewarden, Rahden, Sarve, Schockumerdeich, Schweewarden, Schütting, Tettens, Treuenfeld, and Volkers. Two nearby islands are also part of the town: Langlütjen I und Langlütjen II.

== History ==
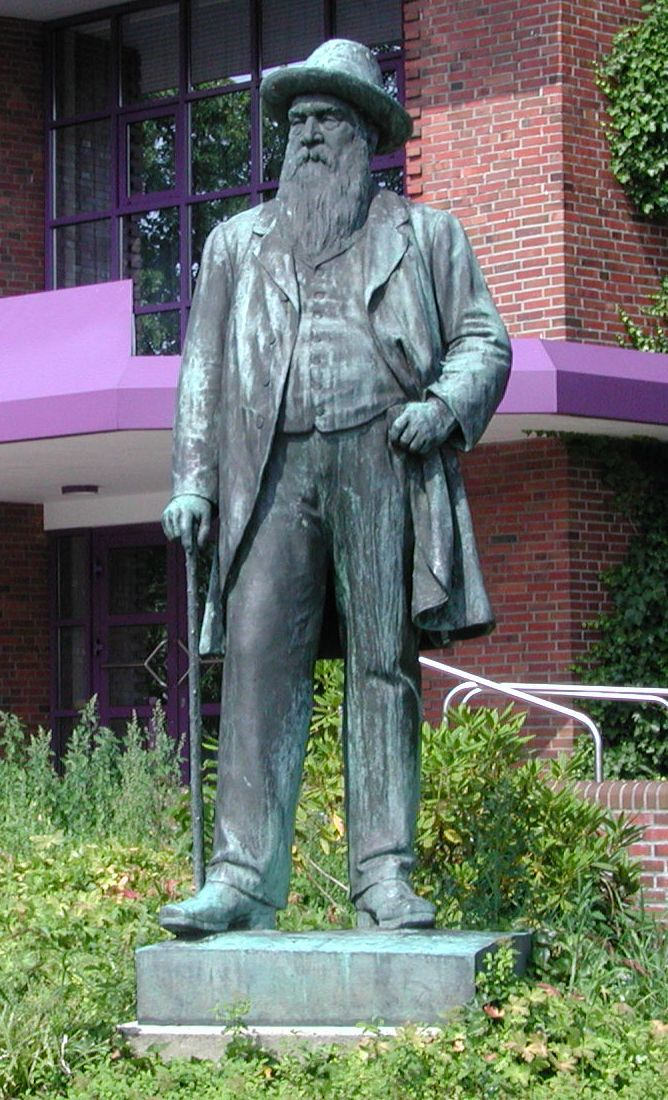
Nordenham's founder Wilhelm Müller

Nordenham evolved from the town of Atens due to the efforts by merchant Wilhelm Müller who traded cattle and sheep to England in the late 19th century. Some of the oldest parts of the modern town area are the old villages or Wurtendörfer (roughly translated as 'terp villages') Blexen, Einswarden and Atens. Bishop Willehad, the Northumbrian-born missionary of the Frisians, died in Blexen in the year 789, which is also commonly accepted to be Blexen's year of foundation. In 1407, the Vredeborch or Friedeburg (to be translated as "peace castle") was erected by the Hanseatic city of Bremen, a castle (although it was probably more a kind of large fortified house) to protect interests against the rebellious inhabitants, the Rüstringer Frisians. The stronghold was destroyed in 1425 and it is possible that the site was later used by a monastery. Nordenham's town founder Wilhelm Müller later built his farm house and a restaurant on the same site. In 1959 those were demolished and the still existing community hall was built there. The town hall was built in 1953 and moved into by the local authority in January 1954.

Between 1499 and 1514, the area was conquered by the County of Oldenburg and in 1813 by the French emperor Napoleon, whose army shot ten local inhabitants at the church in Blexen.

On May 1, 1908 Nordenham was granted 2nd class town rights and since 1955 Nordenham is an independent town in the Wesermarsch district.

Due to government industrialisation programs in the 1960s and 1970s, various industries opened plants in Nordenham. Among others, the main industries are a nuclear power plant near Esenshamm, which politically belongs to the neighbouring borough of Stadland, airplane construction (Premium AEROTEC) and chemical industry. On the Butjadingen peninsula outside Nordenham people do dairy farming or work in the tourism industry.

== Twin towns – sister cities ==
Nordenham is twinned with:

- Peterlee, England, United Kingdom (1981)
- Świnoujście, Poland (1992)
- Saint-Étienne-du-Rouvray, France (2011)

== Transport ==
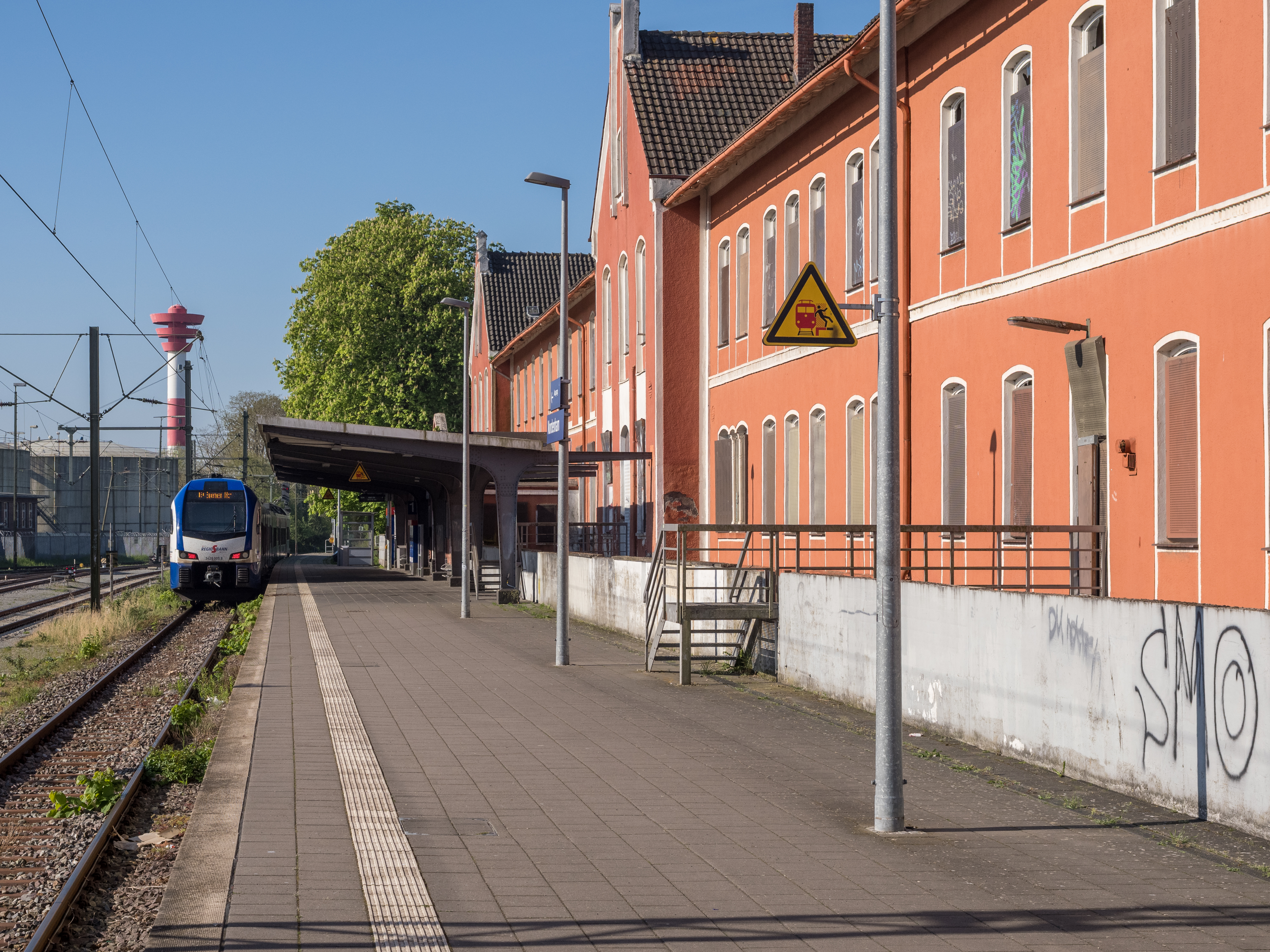
Nordenham station

Due to the town's location, transport connections are below par. There is a ferry to Bremerhaven at Blexen, though it has suffered from steady declines in passenger numbers ever since the Weser tunnel some 10 km south of Nordenham opened. The town is connected to the regional road network by Bundesstraße 212 which intersects with Bundesstraße 437 near the Weser tunnel, offering connections to the A 27 and A 28 motorways.

Nordenham can be reached by RegionalExpress trains; Nordenham railway station sees hourly trains to Bremen. Nordenham has been integrated into the Bremen S-Bahn network since its opening in 2010.

== Economy ==
A large part of the population of the town - approximately 4,500 persons - is employed in industrial companies including Prysmian, Norddeutsche Seekabelwerke (NSW), Premium Aerotec, Rhenus Midgard, Kronos Titan, Xstrata and NKT Cables

== Notable people ==
- Klaus Dede (1935–2018), journalist and writer
- Roy Horn (1944–2020), German-American magician and entertainer, member of Siegfried & Roy
- Jürgen Rieger (1946–2009), lawyer and politician (NPD)
- Ina Korter (born 1955), politician (Greens) and member of the Landtag
- Tolga Ciğerci (born 1992), footballer, played over 230 games
- Tolcay Ciğerci (born 1995), footballer, played over 180 games
