= Nordenham station =

Railway station in Nordenham, Lower Saxony, Germany

Nordenham

General information
- Location: Nordenham, Lower Saxony; Germany
- Coordinates: 53.4839°N 8.4873°E
- Line: Hude-Blexen railway
- Platforms: 1

Other information
- Station code: 4573
- DS100 code: HNO
- Category: 6
- Fare zone: VBN: 850

Services
Preceding station	Bremen S-Bahn	Following station
Terminus	RS4	Kleinensiel towards Bremen Hbf
Location

Nordenham (German: Bahnhof Nordenham) is a railway station located in Nordenham, Germany. The station is located on the Hude-Blexen railway. The train services are operated by NordWestBahn. The station has been part of the Bremen S-Bahn since December 2010.

The station is situated close to the Weser estuary, being the terminus for passenger traffic on the Nordenham to Bremen railway line. The line sees moderately dense through freight traffic to Nordenham-Blexen, where heavy industry is located.

== Train services ==
The following services currently call at the station:

- Bremen S-Bahn services RS4 Nordenham - Hude - Delmenhorst - Bremen
