= Bundesstraße 202 =

Federal highway in Germany

B 202
- Bundesstraße 202

Route information
- Length: 135 km (84 mi)

Major junctions
- West end: Sankt Peter Ording
- East end: Oldenburg in Holstein

Location
- Country: Germany
- States: Schleswig-Holstein

Highway system
- Roads in Germany; Autobahns; List; Federal; List; State; E-roads

The Bundesstraße 202 is a German federal road or Bundesstraße and the west–east link between Sankt Peter Ording, Tönning, Friedrichstadt, Rendsburg, Kiel, Lütjenburg and Oldenburg in Holstein in the central part of the state of Schleswig-Holstein.

== Route ==
The B 202 begins in Sankt Peter Ording at the west coast of Schleswig-Holstein. It then continues eastwoards towards Tönning. Here it runs together with the B 5 for a while until it reaches Friedrichstadt. The route continues near the Eider river towards Rendsburg where it meets the B 77 and the B 203. The road between Rendsburg and Kiel was downgraded due to the construchtion of the A 210 motorway. In Kiel it runs together with the B 76 with connections with the B 404 and the B 502. In Schwentinental it leaves the B 76 and runs towards Lütjenburg where it has a connection with the B 430. The route ends at Oldenburg in Holstein at the A 1 motorway.

== Major junctions ==
State	District	Location	km	mi	Exit	Name	Destinations	Notes
Schleswig-Holstein	Nordfriesland	Sankt Peter Ording				Sankt Peter Ording	Wesselburen	cross-level intersection with local roads
Schleswig-Holstein	Nordfriesland	No junctions along Tating, Garding, Katharinenheerd and Kotzenbüll						
Schleswig-Holstein	Nordfriesland	Tönning				Tönning-Friedrichstädter Chaussee	Tönning	
Schleswig-Holstein	Nordfriesland	Tönning				Tönning	B 5 – Heide, Hamburg ( A 23)	Western end of concurrency with the B 5
Schleswig-Holstein	Nordfriesland	Oldenswort				Rothenspieker	Oldenswort	Exit under construction
Schleswig-Holstein	Nordfriesland	Witzwort				Reimersbude	Witzwort	Exit planned
Schleswig-Holstein	Nordfriesland	Witzwort				Witzwort	B 5 – Husum	Eastern end of concurrency with the B 5 trumpet interchange interchange rebuild planned
Schleswig-Holstein	Nordfriesland	Friedrichstadt				Friedrichstadt	B 5 – Heide, Hamburg	cross-level intersection former intersection with the B 5 B 5 was relocated in 1972
Schleswig-Holstein	No junctions along Seeth, Stapel, Erfde, Christiansholm and Hohn							
Schleswig-Holstein	Rendsburg-Eckernförde	Fockbek				Fockbek	B 203 – Heide	Western End of concurrency with the B 203 cross-level intersection
Schleswig-Holstein	Rendsburg-Eckernförde	Rendsburg				Rendsburg-West	B 77 – Schleswig, Flensburg ( A 7); B 203 – Eckernförde, Büdelsdorf	Western End of concurrency with the B 77 Eastern End of concurrency with the B 203
Schleswig-Holstein	Rendsburg-Eckernförde	Rendsburg				Rendsburg-Mitte	Rendsburg-Mitte	
Schleswig-Holstein	Rendsburg-Eckernförde	Kiel Canal				Rendsburg Tunnel	Kiel Canal	
Schleswig-Holstein	Rendsburg-Eckernförde	Westerrönfeld				Rendsburg-Süd	B 77 – Itzehoe	Eastern End of concurrency with the B 77
Schleswig-Holstein	Rendsburg-Eckernförde	Rendsburg				Rendsburg-Itzehoer Chaussee	Rendsburg-Süd	
Schleswig-Holstein	Rendsburg-Eckernförde	Rendsburg				Rendsburg-Zum Hafen	Emkendorf, Osterrönfeld	
Schleswig-Holstein	Rendsburg-Eckernförde	Osterrönfeld				Osterrönfeld	Osterrönfeld	former exit was demolished in 2018
Schleswig-Holstein	Rendsburg-Eckernförde	Osterrönfeld			2	Schacht-Audorf	Schacht-Audorf, Schülldorf	
Schleswig-Holstein	Rendsburg-Eckernförde	Osterrönfeld			—	—	A 210 – Hamburg/Flensburg ( A 7), Kiel	Transition to the A 210 motorway
Schleswig-Holstein	Road interruption Route used to run along Schacht-Audorf, Bovenau, Bredenbek and Achterwehr							
Schleswig-Holstein	Kiel	Südfriedhof			2	Kiel-Mitte	A 215 – Hamburg, Flensburg ( A 7), Rendsburg ( A 210), Kiel-Zentrum	Western endpoint of concurrency with the B 76
Schleswig-Holstein	Kiel	Südfriedhof				Kiel-Saarbrückenstraße	Kiel-IKEA, Kiel-CITTI PARK, Kiel-Westring	
Schleswig-Holstein	Kiel	Südfriedhof				Kiel-Winterbeker Weg	Kiel-REWE Center, Kiel-Hassee	
Schleswig-Holstein	Kiel	Hassee				Kiel-Hamburger Chaussee	Kiel-Rondeel, Schulensee	
Schleswig-Holstein	Kiel	Gaarden-Süd/Kronsburg				Kiel-Barkauer Kreuz	B 404 – Kiel-Wellsee, Bad Segeberg, Hamburg	
Schleswig-Holstein	Kiel	Gaarden-Süd/Kronsburg				Kiel-Barkauer Kreuz	A 21 – Hamburg, Berlin, Lüneburg	proposed motorway will end here
Schleswig-Holstein	Kiel	Gaarden-Süd/Kronsburg				Kiel-Joachimsplatz	Kiel-Zentrum, Kiel-HDW	Incomplete Junction: na ramps between Lübeck and Joachimsplatz Access through next junction
Schleswig-Holstein	Kiel	Gaarden-Süd/Kronsburg				Kiel-Ostring	B 502 – Schönkirchen, Heikendorf, Schönberg	
Schleswig-Holstein	Kiel	Gaarden-Süd/Kronsburg				Kiel-Wellsee	Kiel-Wellsee	Incomplete junction:no exit ramp Eckernförde → Wellsee Access through previous junction
Schleswig-Holstein	Kiel	Elmschenhagen				Kiel-Wellseedamm	Kiel-Wellsee, Kiel-Elmschenhagen	
Schleswig-Holstein	Kiel	Elmschenhagen				Kiel-Elmschenhagen-Mitte	Kiel-Elmschenhagen	
Schleswig-Holstein	Plön	Schwentinental				Schwentinental-Nord	Schwentinental-Klausdorf, Kiel-Wellingdorf	
Schleswig-Holstein	Plön	Schwentinental				Schwentinental	Schwentinental	
Schleswig-Holstein	Plön	Schwentinental				Schwentinental-Fernsichtweg	Schwentinental-Raisdorf	Incomplete junction: only ramps westbound
Schleswig-Holstein	Plön	Schwentinental				Schwentinental-Süd	B 76 – Lübeck, Preetz	Eastern endpoint of concurrency with the B 76
Schleswig-Holstein	Plön	Rastorf				Lilienthal	Laboe, Schönberg, Preetz, Dobersdorf	Dobersdorf is only signed eastbound
Schleswig-Holstein	Plön	No junctions along Rastorfer Passau, Wittenberger Passau, Selent and Bellin						
Schleswig-Holstein	Plön	Lütjenburg				Lütjenburg	B 430 – Neumünster, Plön	one-quadrant interchange
Schleswig-Holstein	No junctions along Kaköhl and Döhnsdorf							
Schleswig-Holstein	Ostholstein	Oldenburg in Holstein			11	Oldenburg/Holstein-Süd	A 1 / E47 – Lübeck, Puttgarden	
Schleswig-Holstein	Ostholstein	Oldenburg in Holstein				Oldenburg in Holstein-Neustädter Straße	B 207 – Lübeck, Puttgarden	Former route in Oldenburg cross-level intersection
1.000 mi = 1.609 km; 1.000 km = 0.621 mi: Concurrency terminus; Closed/former; Incomplete access; Proposed; Route transition

== See also ==
- List of federal roads in Germany
