= Bundesautobahn 210 =

Federal motorway in Germany

A 210
- Bundesautobahn 210
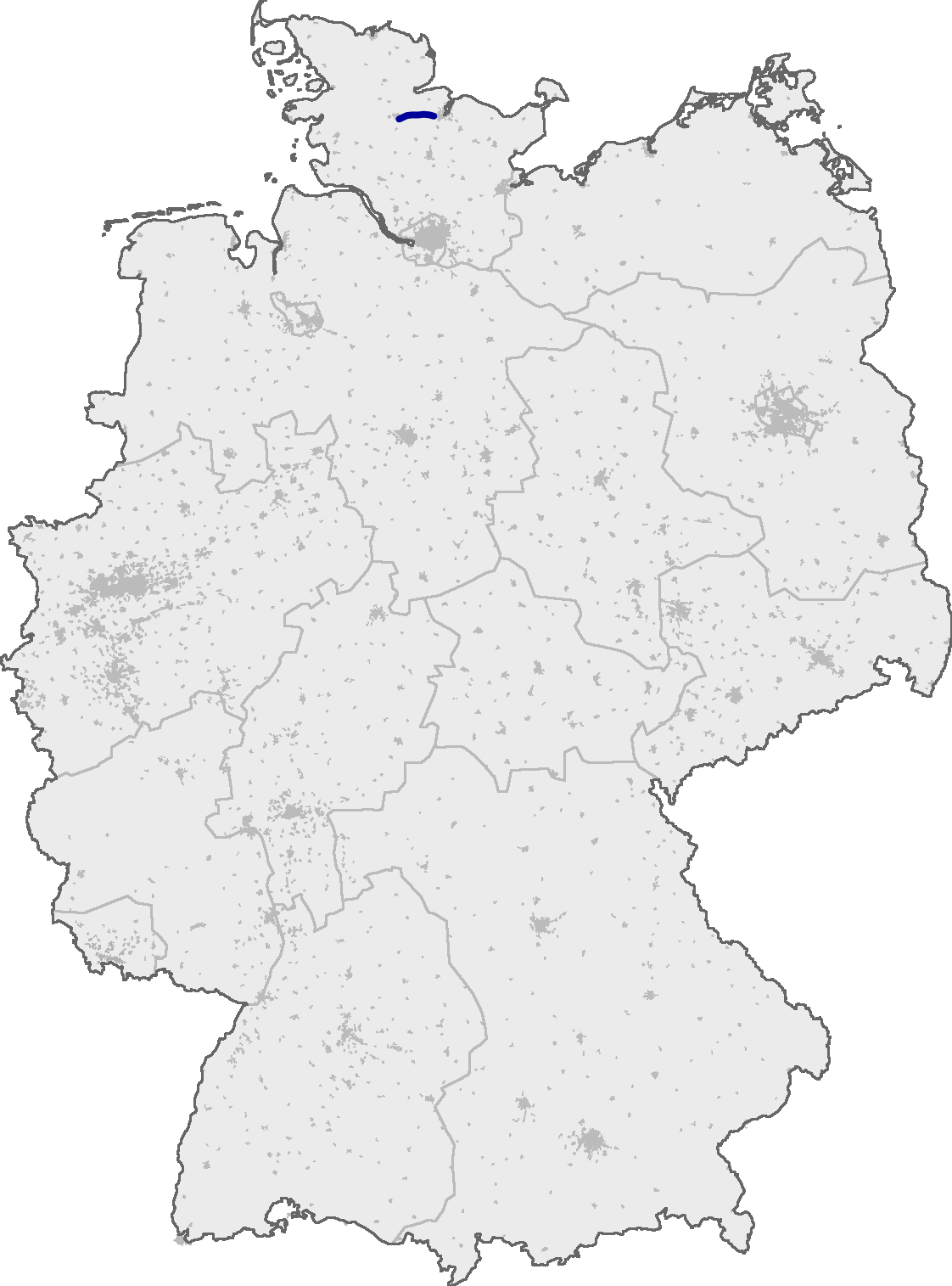

Route information
- Length: 25 km (16 mi)

Major junctions
- West end: B 202 in Schacht-Audorf
- East end: A 215 in Kiel

Location
- Country: Germany
- States: Schleswig-Holstein

Highway system
- Roads in Germany; Autobahns; List; Federal; List; State; E-roads
← A 143	→ A 215

Bundesautobahn 210 (translates from German as Federal Motorway 210, short form Autobahn 210, abbreviated as BAB 210 or A 210) is a route that connects the federal state capital of Kiel to Rendsburg. This route serves to further ease the ground transportation route from Kiel to Schleswig and into Scandinavia.

== Exit list ==
State	District	Location	km	mi	Exit	Name	Destinations	Notes
Schleswig-Holstein	Rendsburg-Eckernförde	Osterrönfeld	0.0	0.0	—	—	B 202 – Sankt Peter-Ording, Rendsburg, Heide( B 203), Itzehoe ( B 77)	Western endpoint of motorway
Schleswig-Holstein	Rendsburg-Eckernförde	Osterrönfeld	0.8	0.50	2	Schacht-Audorf	Schacht-Audorf, Schülldorf, Osterrönfeld	
Schleswig-Holstein	Rendsburg-Eckernförde	Schülldorf	3.7	2.3	3	Rendsburg interchange	A 7 / E45 – Flensburg, Hamburg	cloverleaf interchange
Schleswig-Holstein	Rendsburg-Eckernförde	Bredenbek	10.4	6.5	4	Bredenbek	Bredenbek, Bovenau	
Schleswig-Holstein	Rendsburg-Eckernförde	Felde	14.3	8.9	Rest area	Hasenmoor (eastbound); Neunordsee (westbound)	Hasenmoor rest area Neunordsee rest area	
Schleswig-Holstein	Rendsburg-Eckernförde	Felde	16.6	10.3	5	Achterwehr	Achterwehr, Westensee, Felde	
Schleswig-Holstein	Rendsburg-Eckernförde	Achterwehr	17.8	11.1	Bridge	Ringkanlbrücke	Eider river	length: 80 m
Schleswig-Holstein	Rendsburg-Eckernförde	Quarnbek	18.3	11.4	Bridge	Straße- und Bahnbrücke	Kiel-Hassee–Osterrönfeld railway	length: 100 m
Schleswig-Holstein	Rendsburg-Eckernförde	Melsdorf	22.4	13.9	6	Melsdorf	Melsdorf, Kiel-Russee	
Schleswig-Holstein	Kiel	Russee	24.7	15.3	7	Kiel-West interchange	A 215 – Kiel-Mitte, Hamburg, Blumenthal, Kiel-Mettenhof	modified cloverleaf interchange Eastern endpoint of motorway
1.000 mi = 1.609 km; 1.000 km = 0.621 mi: Route transition
