= Bundesstraße 77 =

Federal highway in Germany

B 77
- Bundesstraße 77

Route information
- Length: 71 km (44 mi)

Major junctions
- North end: Schleswig
- South end: Itzehoe

Location
- Country: Germany
- States: Schleswig-Holstein

Highway system
- Roads in Germany; Autobahns; List; Federal; List; State; E-roads

The Bundesstraße 77 is a German federal road or Bundesstraße and the north–south link between Schleswig, Rendsburg, Hohenwestedt and Itzehoe in the central part of the state of Schleswig-Holstein.

== Route ==
The B 77 begins in the city of Schleswig where the route continues as B 76. South of Schleswig at Busdorf the B 77 is connected via a local road to the A 7 motorway. Then it bypasses Kropp and continues towards Rendsburg. In Rendsburg it has a connection with the B 203 as well as the B 202 with runs with the B 77 through the Rendsburg Tunnel under the Kiel canal. Then the B 77 bypasses Jevenstedt and meets the B 430 in Hohenwestedt. Then it ends in Itzehoe where it meets the B 206

== Major junctions ==
State	District	Location	km	mi	Exit	Name	Destinations	Notes
Schleswig-Holstein	Schleswig-Flensburg	Busdorf	0.0	0.0		Schleswig-Busdorf	B 76 – Flensburg, Schleswig, Kiel, Eckernförde	
Schleswig-Holstein	Schleswig-Flensburg	Busdorf	2.2	1.4		Schleswig-Dannewerkk	Dannewerk ( A 7 / E45)	
Schleswig-Holstein	No junctions along Jagel and Kropp							
Schleswig-Holstein	Rendsburg-Eckernförde	Alt Duvenstedt	18.4	11.4		Duvenstedt	Sankt Peter Ording, Heide, Krummenort	St. Peter Ording is only signed southbound
Schleswig-Holstein	Rendsburg-Eckernförde	Rendsburg	21.7	13.5		Rendsburg-Nord	Alt Duvenstedt, Rendsburg-Nord	
Schleswig-Holstein	Rendsburg-Eckernförde	Rendsburg	23.2	14.4		Rendsburg-Nordwest	Sankt Peter Ording, Heide, Fockbek, Rendsburg-Nordwest	Sankt Peter Ording and Heide are only signed northbound
Schleswig-Holstein	Rendsburg-Eckernförde	Rendsburg	24.2	15.0		Rendsburg-West	B 202 / B 203 – Fockbek, Sankt Peter Ording, Heide, Eckernförde, Rendsburg-West	Northern Endpoint of concurrency with the B 202 Northern Endpoint of dual carriageway
Schleswig-Holstein	Rendsburg-Eckernförde	Rendsburg	26.4	16.4		Rendsburg-Mitte	Rendsburg-Mitte	
Schleswig-Holstein	Rendsburg-Eckernförde	Kiel Canal	27.2	16.9		Rendsburg Tunnel	Kiel Canal	
Schleswig-Holstein	Rendsburg-Eckernförde	Westerrönfeld	28.4	17.6		Rendsburg-Süd	B 202 – Kiel, Westerrönfeld, Osterrönfeld, Eckernförde, Schülp, ( A 7 / A 210)	Southern Endpoint of concurrency with the B 202 Schülp is only signed southbound Eckernförde is only signed northbound
Schleswig-Holstein	Rendsburg-Eckernförde	Jevenstedt	34.3	21.3		Jevenstedt	Lübeck, Neumünster, Jevenstedt ( A 7)	Southern Endpoint of dual carriageway
Schleswig-Holstein	Rendsburg-Eckernförde	No junctions along Brinjahe and Remmels						
Schleswig-Holstein	Rendsburg-Eckernförde	Hohenwestedt	52.3	32.5		Hohenwestedt	B 430 – Neumünster, Heide, ( A 7 / A 23)	one-quadrant interchange
Schleswig-Holstein	No junctions along Jahrsdorf and western Hohenlockstedt							
Schleswig-Holstein	Steinburg	Itzehoe	71.3	44.3		Itzehoe	B 206 – Heide, Glückstadt, Lübeck, Bad Bramstedt, ( A 23 – Hamburg, Husum)	cross-level intersection
1.000 mi = 1.609 km; 1.000 km = 0.621 mi: Concurrency terminus

== See also ==
- List of federal roads in Germany
