= Hohn, Schleswig-Holstein =

Hohn
- Municipality
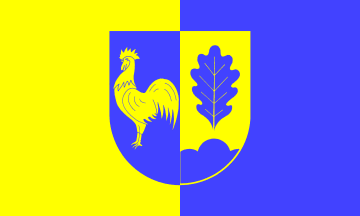
- Flag Coat of arms

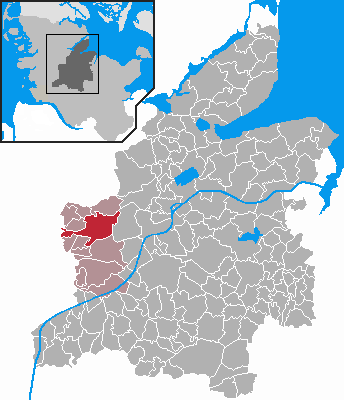
- Location of Hohn within Rendsburg-Eckernförde district
- Interactive map of Hohn
- Location within Germany Location within Schleswig-Holstein
- Coordinates: 54°17′N 9°30′E
- Country: Germany
- State: Schleswig-Holstein
- District: Rendsburg-Eckernförde
- Municipal assoc.: Hohner Harde

Government
  - Mayor: Bernd Müller

Area
  - Total: 31.95 km^{2} (12.34 sq mi)
- Elevation: 18 m (59 ft)

Population (2025-12-31)
  - Total: 2,763
  - Density: 86.48/km^{2} (224.0/sq mi)
- Time zone: UTC+01:00 (CET)
  - Summer (DST): UTC+02:00 (CEST)
- Postal codes: 24806
- Dialling codes: 04335
- Vehicle registration: RD
- Website: www.amt-hohner- harde.de

Hohn (German pronunciation: [hoːn]) is a municipality in the district of Rendsburg-Eckernförde, in Schleswig-Holstein, Germany. Hohn is located to the south of the Königshügel and Lohe-Föhrden municipalities, but north of Friedrichsgraben, Sophienhamm and Elsdorf-Westermühlen, and west of the municipality of Fockbek.
