= Bundesstraße 430 =

Federal highway in Germany

B 430
- Bundesstraße 430
- B430 in red

Major junctions
- From: Agethorst (bei Schenefeld)
- To: Lütjenburg

Location
- Country: Germany
- States: Schleswig-Holstein

Highway system
- Roads in Germany; Autobahns; List; Federal; List; State; E-roads

The Bundesstraße 430 is a German federal road or Bundesstraße and the east-west link between Dithmarschen and Holstein in the southern part of the state of Schleswig-Holstein.

== Route ==
The B 430 begins at the A 23 motorway near Schenefeld and runs via Aukrug to the A 7, which it crosses near Neumünster-Mitte. Further east of Neumünster it crosses the A 21 near Bornhöved and continues through the Holstein Switzerland Nature Park via Ascheberg and Plön (crossing the B 76) to Lütjenburg (joining the B 202) on Hohwacht Bay on the Baltic Sea.

== Junction lists ==
Legend:

- I/C - Interchange, I/S - Intersection, RSA - Rest and service area, OBR - Overhead bridge restaurant, R/R - Restaurant and rest plaza, L/B - Layby, V/P - Vista point, TN - tunnel, T/P - Toll plaza, BR - Bridge
- C - Cloverleaf, S - Stack, T-A - Trumpet-A, T-B - Trumpet-B, DT - Directional-T/Y, SDT - Semi-Directional-T/Y, P-Y - Partial-Y, D - Diamond, P-C - Partial cloverleaf, D-D - Diverging diamond, D-R - Direct ramp

(7)	Schenefeld A 23
	Schenefeld
	Hohenwestedt B 77
	Aukrug
(14)	Neumünster-Mitte A 7
	Neumünster
	Bönebüttel
(8)	Bornhöved A 21
	Bornhöved
	Ascheberg (Holstein)
	Plön B 76
	Lütjenburg B 202

== Scenic sections ==
- Ascheberg to Lütjenburg

== See also ==
- List of federal roads in Germany
