= Krummwisch =

- Municipality
- Coat of arms

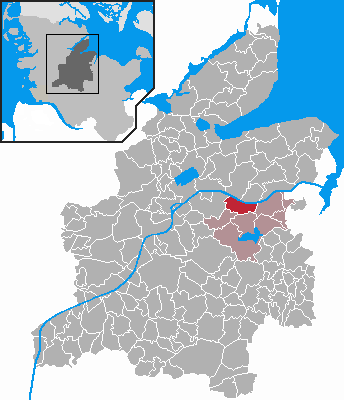
- Location of Krummwisch within Rendsburg-Eckernförde district
- Interactive map of Krummwisch
- Location within Germany Location within Schleswig-Holstein
- Coordinates: 54°20′N 9°54′E
- Country: Germany
- State: Schleswig-Holstein
- District: Rendsburg-Eckernförde
- Municipal assoc.: Achterwehr

Government
  - Mayor: Marko Schiefelbein

Area
  - Total: 13.91 km^{2} (5.37 sq mi)
- Elevation: 29 m (95 ft)

Population (2025-12-31)
  - Total: 722
  - Density: 51.9/km^{2} (134/sq mi)
- Time zone: UTC+01:00 (CET)
  - Summer (DST): UTC+02:00 (CEST)
- Postal codes: 24796
- Dialling codes: 04334
- Vehicle registration: RD
- Website: www.krummwisch.de

Krummwisch is a municipality in the district of Rendsburg-Eckernförde, in Schleswig-Holstein, Germany.

The location of Krummwisch is south of the municipality of Lindau or Schinkel, but north of Bredenbek or Felde, and east of Bovenau.
