= Westerrönfeld =

- Municipality
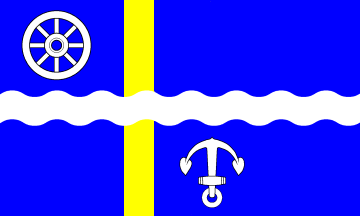
- Flag Coat of arms

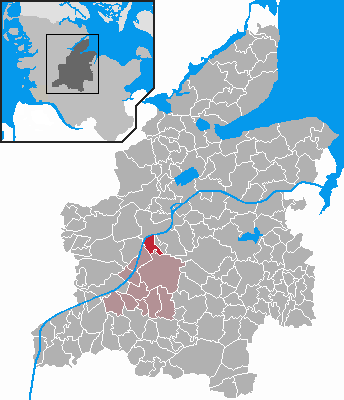
- Location of Westerrönfeld within Rendsburg-Eckernförde district
- Interactive map of Westerrönfeld
- Location within Germany Location within Schleswig-Holstein
- Coordinates: 54°17′N 9°39′E
- Country: Germany
- State: Schleswig-Holstein
- District: Rendsburg-Eckernförde
- Municipal assoc.: Jevenstedt

Government
  - Mayor: Dr. Norbert Klause (SPD)

Area
  - Total: 7.78 km^{2} (3.00 sq mi)
- Elevation: 8 m (26 ft)

Population (2025-12-31)
  - Total: 4,934
  - Density: 634/km^{2} (1,640/sq mi)
- Time zone: UTC+01:00 (CET)
  - Summer (DST): UTC+02:00 (CEST)
- Postal codes: 24784
- Dialling codes: 04331
- Vehicle registration: RD
- Website: www.amt- jevenstedt.de

Westerrönfeld is a municipality in the district of Rendsburg-Eckernförde, in Schleswig-Holstein, Germany. The name literally means "The field west of the Rön", the Rön being a little tributary of the river Eider. Westerrönfeld is located on the southern bank of the Kiel Canal.

== Geography and Traffic ==
The town is located directly at the Kiel Canal. Neighboring municipalities are (clockwise, starting in the north): Rendsburg, Jevenstedt and Schülp. In former times there were some heath areas and inland dunes in the area of the municipality, of which only a few are still preserved.

From 1901 on the village was a stop of the Rendsburger Kreisbahn, which went from Rendsburg to Hohenwestedt. In 1957 this line was closed down.

Westerrönfeld is located on the Bundesstraße 77 (national road) from Rendsburg to Itzehoe and the Bundesstraße 202 (national road), which leads from St. Peter-Ording via Rendsburg in the direction of Kiel and joins the A 210 (national highway) in Osterrönfeld (junction Schacht-Audorf). Thus the community is indirectly connected to the A 7 motorway.

== History ==
The place, which was located at a ford (crossing) of the eider river at the Ochsenweg, was first mentioned in the Kieler Erbebuch in 1437. During the Thirty Years' War, the Swedish troops besieging Rendsburg were stationed in Westerrönfeld, with looting taking place in Westerrönfeld.

Since 1695 there has been a Jewish cemetery in the village where Jewish citizens from Rendsburg were buried.

In the 18th century more than 100 inhabitants died of the plague. For them a cemetery was created especially outside the village.

The community originally belonged to the administrative district (later Amt) Jevenstedt. By refugees, who found a new home in Westerrönfeld, the number of inhabitants grew after the Second World War from 1500 to 2500. In 1948 the municipality left the office. On 1 January 2001 Westerrönfeld gave up self-administration and rejoined the Jevenstedt office.

On 12 December 1991 there was an assassination attempt on two employees of the Abwasserzweckverband in Westerrönfeld. A farmer from Fockbek, who had shot the two officers, drove his car loaded with explosives against the town hall in Fockbek. He then shot himself.

== Government ==
=== Municipal Council ===
Party	Seats
Christian Democratic Union (CDU)	10
Social Democratic Party (SPD)	5
Voting Group (KWG)	5
Alliance 90/The Greens (Grüne)	4
Source: Statistical office for Hamburg and Schleswig-Holstein

2003 municipal elections: Of the 19 seats in the municipal council, the CDU has had ten seats since the 2003 municipal elections, the SPD six and the KWG voter group three.

2008 municipal elections: Of the 19 seats in the local council, the CDU has had nine seats since the 2008 local elections, the SPD six and the KWG four.

2013 municipal elections: Of the 17 seats in the municipal council, the CDU has had eight seats since the 2013 municipal elections, the SPD six and the KWG voters' association three.

2018 municipal elections: Of the 17 seats in the municipal council, the CDU has had eight seats since the 2018 municipal elections, the SPD five and the KWG voters' association four.

2023 municipal elections: Of the 24 seats in the local council, the CDU has had ten seats, the SPD five, the KWG five and The Greens 4.

=== Coat of arms ===
The crest and flag were approved on 23 March. It was described as "In blue a golden pole, crossed and covered at the crossing point with a silver waved beam; in the first quarter a silver wagon wheel with eight spokes, in the fourth quarter a fallen silver anchor".

In the past, Westerrönfled used to be a village at the Eider river, which was mainly agricultural. Today it lies in the structure-changing access area of Rendsburg. The wavebars in the crest, marks not only the Eider river but also the Kiel canal, which borders at the municipality to the north. The anchor in the coat of arms indicates that canal and, before that, eider navigation meant participation in waterway traffic for the town. At the same time, the wavebars can be understood as a "talking" translation of the village name "Feld bei der Rinne" (in Low German: "Rönn"). What is meant is the Wehrau, which flows through the neighboring community of Osterrönfeld into the Kiel Canal. The tunnel under the canal, represented by the pole, leads from Westerrönfeld to Rendsburg. It is part of the Bundesstraße 77, which leads through the village. The wagon wheel documents the volume of traffic. The shield color blue symbolizes once again the importance of the waterways for the village.

=== Flag ===
The base is blue, two continuous stripes form a Latin cross, the horizontal strip is white and wavy, the vertical is yellow and is covert by the white strip on the crossing point. In the top, left corner is a white wagon wheel and the bottom white corner shows a white, toppled anchor.

=== Partner Communities ===
The places Tingleff in Danemark and Züssow in Mecklenburg-Vorpommern are the partner communities of Westerrönfeld.

== Economy ==
The town was originally characterized by agriculture, fishing, shipping and shipbuilding. Today the village is an industrial area through the proximity of Rendsburg as well as the traffic connection to Kiel and the connection to the Bundesautobahn 7.
