= Lohe =

Lohe or Löhe may refer to:

- Johann Konrad Wilhelm Löhe (1808–1872), Lutheran leader
- Frederic Löhe (born 1988), German football player
- Lohe-Föhrden, Rendsburg-Eckernförde, Germany
- Lohe-Rickelshof, Dithmarschen, Germany
- Lohe, a district in Bad Oeynhausen, Germany
- Lohe, a district in Barßel, Germany
- Lohe, a district in Lippstadt, Germany
- Lohe, a district in Stöckse, Germany
- Löhe Memorial Library, part of Australian Lutheran College, named after Johannes Paul Löhe

== See also ==
- Luohe, a city in Henan Province, China
