= Hohner Harde =

- Amt
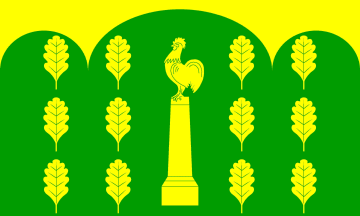
- Flag Coat of arms

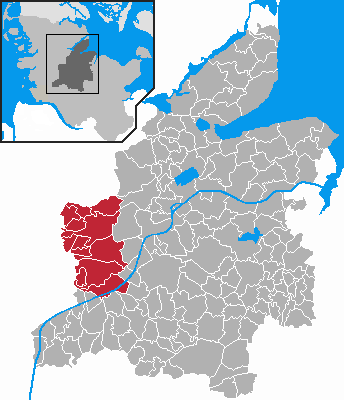
- Map of Rendsburg-Eckernförde highlighting Hohner Harde
- Interactive map of Hohner Harde
- Location within Germany Location within Schleswig-Holstein
- Coordinates: 54°16′N 9°31′E
- Country: Germany
- State: Schleswig-Holstein
- District: Rendsburg-Eckernförde
- Seat: Fockbek
- Subdivisions: 12 municipalities

Government
  - Mayor: Udo Wessolowski

Area
  - Total: 167.89 km^{2} (64.82 sq mi)

Population (2025-12-31)
  - Total: 8,996
  - Density: 53.58/km^{2} (138.8/sq mi)
- Time zone: UTC+01:00 (CET)
  - Summer (DST): UTC+02:00 (CEST)
- Website: www.amt-hohner-harde.de

Hohner Harde is an Amt ("collective municipality") in the district of Rendsburg-Eckernförde, in Schleswig-Holstein, Germany. It is situated approximately 10 km west of Rendsburg. The seat of the Amt is in Fockbek, itself not part of the Amt. The Amt Hohner Harde was formed in 1970 by the merger of the former Ämter Hamdorf and Hohn with the formerly independent municipality Breiholz.

Hohner Harde consists of the following municipalities:

1. Bargstall
2. Breiholz
3. Christiansholm
4. Elsdorf-Westermühlen
5. Friedrichsgraben
6. Friedrichsholm
7. Hamdorf
8. Hohn
9. Königshügel
10. Lohe-Föhrden
11. Prinzenmoor
12. Sophienhamm
