= Behrensdorf =

- Municipality
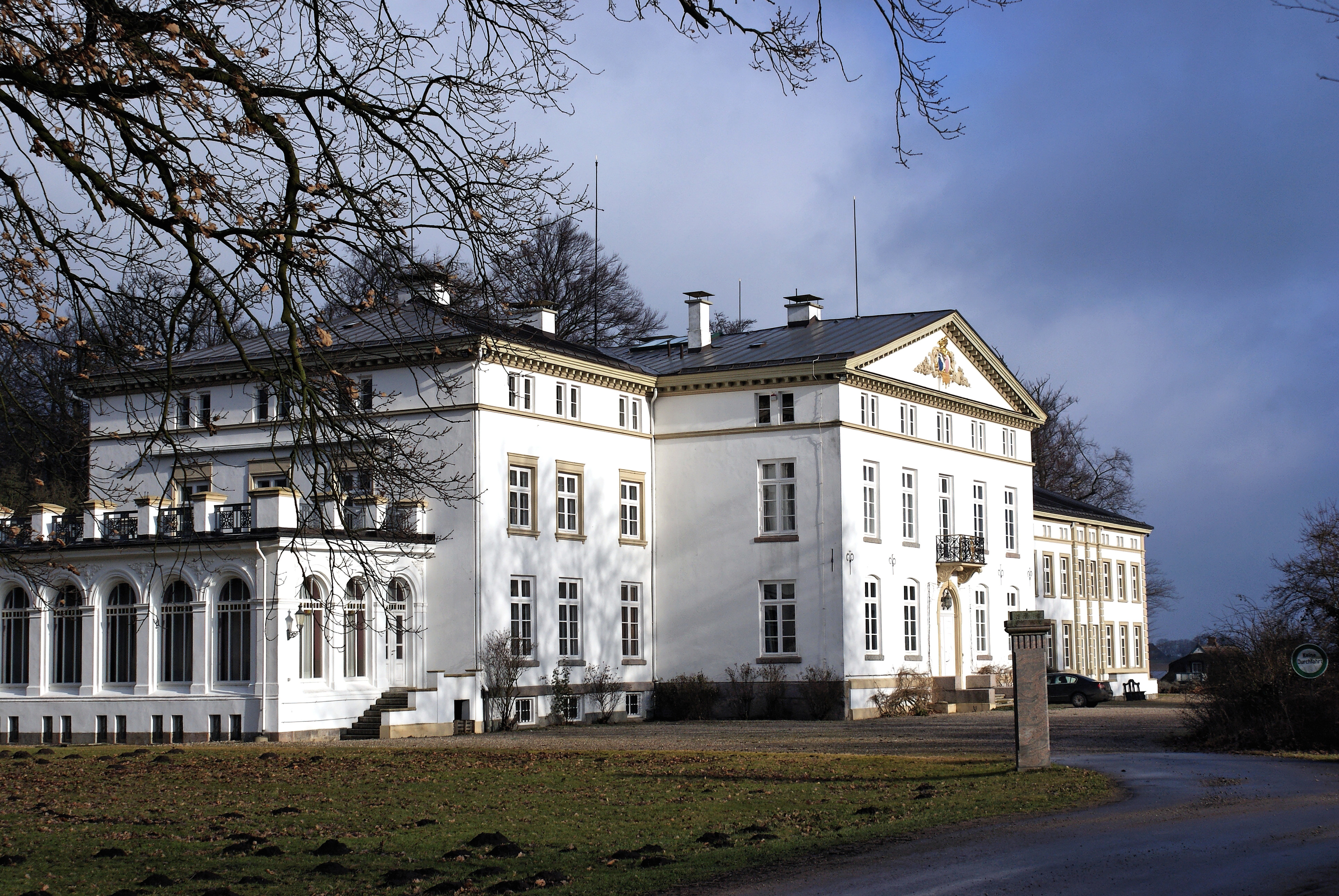
- Gut Waterneverstorf in Behrensdorf

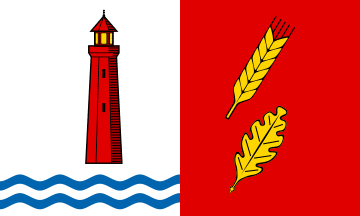
- Flag Coat of arms

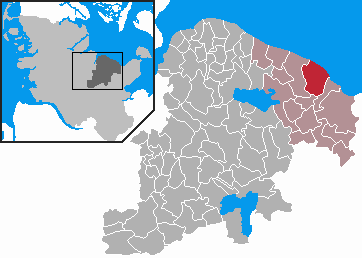
- Location of Behrensdorf within Plön district
- Interactive map of Behrensdorf
- Location within Germany Location within Schleswig-Holstein
- Coordinates: 54°21′N 10°35′E
- Country: Germany
- State: Schleswig-Holstein
- District: Plön
- Municipal assoc.: Lütjenburg

Government
  - Mayor: Manfred Krumbeck (SPD)

Area
  - Total: 20.85 km^{2} (8.05 sq mi)
- Elevation: 3 m (9.8 ft)

Population (2025-12-31)
  - Total: 633
  - Density: 30.4/km^{2} (78.6/sq mi)
- Time zone: UTC+01:00 (CET)
  - Summer (DST): UTC+02:00 (CEST)
- Postal codes: 24321
- Dialling codes: 04381
- Vehicle registration: PLÖ

Behrensdorf is a municipality in the district of Plön, in Schleswig-Holstein, Germany. It lies on the western shore of Hohwacht Bay on the Baltic Sea coast. About one kilometre to the north is the eighty-year-old Neuland Lighthouse.
