= Breiholz =

- Municipality
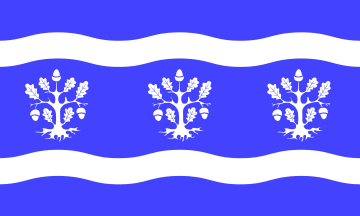
- Flag Coat of arms

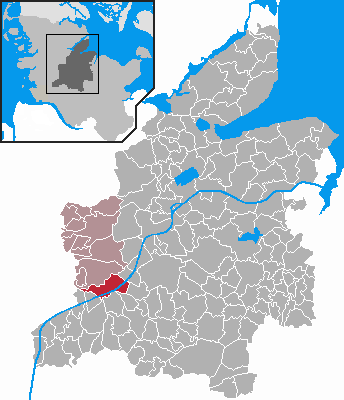
- Location of Breiholz within Rendsburg-Eckernförde district
- Interactive map of Breiholz
- Location within Germany Location within Schleswig-Holstein
- Coordinates: 54°12′52″N 9°32′12″E
- Country: Germany
- State: Schleswig-Holstein
- District: Rendsburg-Eckernförde
- Municipal assoc.: Hohner Harde

Government
  - Mayor: Otto Struwe

Area
  - Total: 18.49 km^{2} (7.14 sq mi)
- Elevation: 13 m (43 ft)

Population (2025-12-31)
  - Total: 1,312
  - Density: 70.96/km^{2} (183.8/sq mi)
- Time zone: UTC+01:00 (CET)
  - Summer (DST): UTC+02:00 (CEST)
- Postal codes: 24797
- Dialling codes: 04332
- Vehicle registration: RD
- Website: www.amt-hohner- harde.de

Breiholz is a municipality in the district of Rendsburg-Eckernförde, in Schleswig-Holstein, Germany.
