= Prinzenmoor =

- Municipality
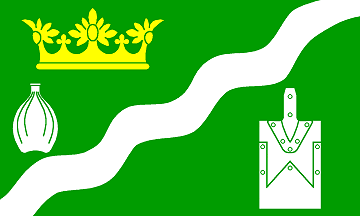
- Flag Coat of arms

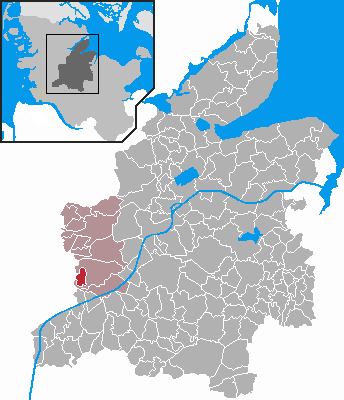
- Location of Prinzenmoor within Rendsburg-Eckernförde district
- Interactive map of Prinzenmoor
- Location within Germany Location within Schleswig-Holstein
- Coordinates: 54°13′N 9°26′E
- Country: Germany
- State: Schleswig-Holstein
- District: Rendsburg-Eckernförde
- Municipal assoc.: Hohner Harde

Government
  - Mayor: Hans August Ammon

Area
  - Total: 5.59 km^{2} (2.16 sq mi)
- Elevation: 3 m (9.8 ft)

Population (2025-12-31)
  - Total: 174
  - Density: 31.1/km^{2} (80.6/sq mi)
- Time zone: UTC+01:00 (CET)
  - Summer (DST): UTC+02:00 (CEST)
- Postal codes: 24805
- Dialling codes: 04332
- Vehicle registration: RD
- Website: www.amt-hohner- harde.de

Prinzenmoor is a municipality in the district of Rendsburg-Eckernförde, in Schleswig-Holstein, Germany.
