= Hamdorf =

- Municipality
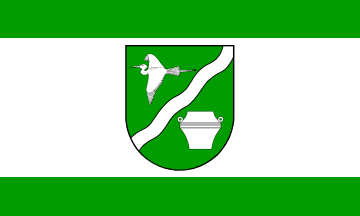
- Flag Coat of arms

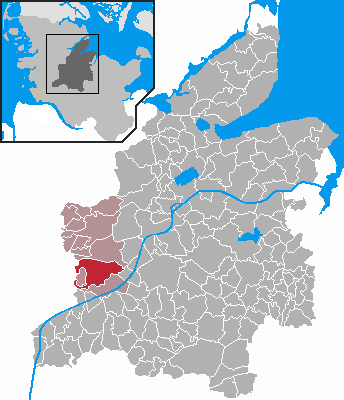
- Location of Hamdorf within Rendsburg-Eckernförde district
- Interactive map of Hamdorf
- Location within Germany Location within Schleswig-Holstein
- Coordinates: 54°14′N 9°32′E
- Country: Germany
- State: Schleswig-Holstein
- District: Rendsburg-Eckernförde
- Municipal assoc.: Hohner Harde

Government
  - Mayor: Jörg Thomsen (CDU)

Area
  - Total: 30.6 km^{2} (11.8 sq mi)
- Elevation: 6 m (20 ft)

Population (2025-12-31)
  - Total: 1,416
  - Density: 46.3/km^{2} (120/sq mi)
- Time zone: UTC+01:00 (CET)
  - Summer (DST): UTC+02:00 (CEST)
- Postal codes: 24805
- Dialling codes: 04332
- Vehicle registration: RD
- Website: www.gemeinde-hamdorf.de

Hamdorf (Danish: Hammeltorp) is a municipality in the district of Rendsburg-Eckernförde, in Schleswig-Holstein, Germany. Hamdorf is situated in Eiderknie in the southern part of the collective municipality of Hohner Harde. The municipal area covers 3,074 hectares.

== History ==
Many prehistoric finds and excavations near the Eider show that Hamdorf has been inhabited since the stone ages. Hamdorf is first mentioned in a deed dated May 28, 1285.
