= Haale, Germany =

Haale
- Municipality
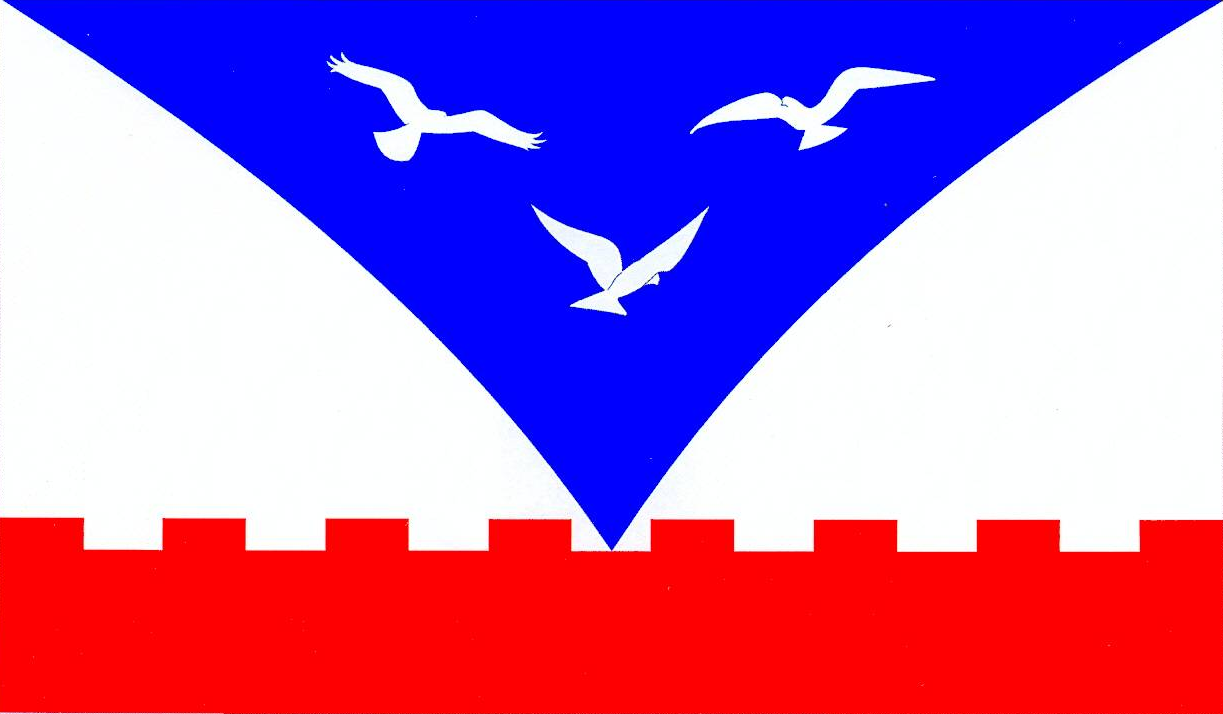
- Flag Coat of arms

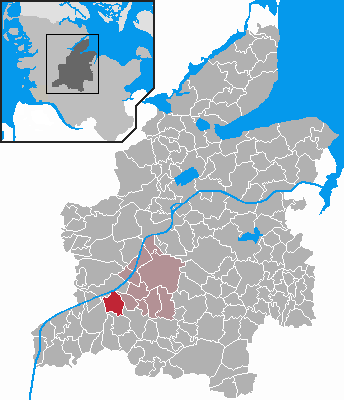
- Location of Haale within Rendsburg-Eckernförde district
- Interactive map of Haale
- Location within Germany Location within Schleswig-Holstein
- Coordinates: 54°11′N 9°33′E
- Country: Germany
- State: Schleswig-Holstein
- District: Rendsburg-Eckernförde
- Municipal assoc.: Jevenstedt

Government
  - Mayor: Bernd Holm

Area
  - Total: 13.03 km^{2} (5.03 sq mi)
- Elevation: 8 m (26 ft)

Population (2025-12-31)
  - Total: 501
  - Density: 38.4/km^{2} (99.6/sq mi)
- Time zone: UTC+01:00 (CET)
  - Summer (DST): UTC+02:00 (CEST)
- Postal codes: 24819
- Dialling codes: 04874
- Vehicle registration: RD
- Website: www.amt-jevenstedt.de

Haale (German pronunciation: [ˈhaːlə]) is a municipality in the district of Rendsburg-Eckernförde, in Schleswig-Holstein, Germany.
