= Jevenstedt (Amt) =

- Amt
- Coat of arms

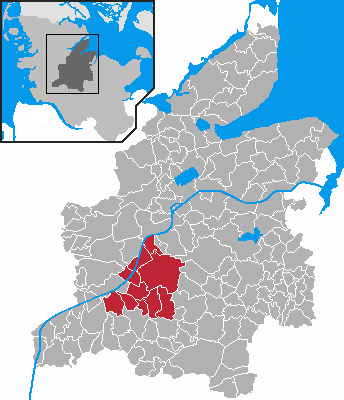
- Map of Rendsburg-Eckernförde highlighting Jevenstedt
- Interactive map of Jevenstedt
- Location within Germany Location within Schleswig-Holstein
- Coordinates: 54°13′N 9°40′E
- Country: Germany
- State: Schleswig-Holstein
- District: Rendsburg-Eckernförde
- Seat: Jevenstedt
- Subdivisions: 10 municipalities

Government
  - Mayor: Hans Hinrich Neve

Area
  - Total: 134.86 km^{2} (52.07 sq mi)

Population (2025-12-31)
  - Total: 11,332
  - Density: 84.028/km^{2} (217.63/sq mi)
- Time zone: UTC+01:00 (CET)
  - Summer (DST): UTC+02:00 (CEST)
- Website: www.amt-jevenstedt.de

Jevenstedt is an Amt ("collective municipality") in the district of Rendsburg-Eckernförde, in Schleswig-Holstein, Germany. The seat of the Amt is in Jevenstedt.

The Amt Jevenstedt consists of the following municipalities:

1. Brinjahe
2. Embühren
3. Haale
4. Hamweddel
5. Hörsten
6. Jevenstedt
7. Luhnstedt
8. Schülp bei Rendsburg
9. Stafstedt
10. Westerrönfeld
