= Achterwehr (Amt) =

- Amt
- Coat of arms

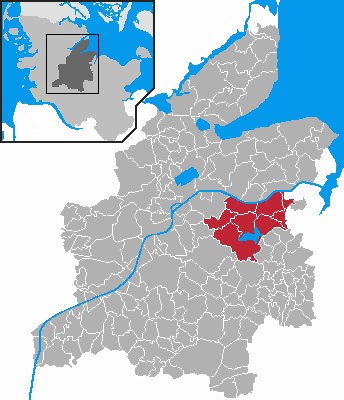
- Map of Rendsburg-Eckernförde highlighting Achterwehr
- Interactive map of Achterwehr
- Location within Germany Location within Schleswig-Holstein
- Coordinates: 54°15′N 10°04′E
- Country: Germany
- State: Schleswig-Holstein
- District: Rendsburg-Eckernförde
- Subdivisions: 8 municipalities

Government
  - Mayor: Anne Katrin Kittmann (SPD)

Area
  - Total: 118.42 km^{2} (45.72 sq mi)

Population (2025-12-31)
  - Total: 11,636
  - Density: 98.260/km^{2} (254.49/sq mi)
- Time zone: UTC+01:00 (CET)
  - Summer (DST): UTC+02:00 (CEST)
- Website: www.amt-achterwehr.de

Achterwehr is an Amt ("collective municipality") in the district of Rendsburg-Eckernförde, in Schleswig-Holstein, Germany. The seat of the Amt is in Achterwehr.

== Subdivision ==
The Amt Achterwehr consists of the following municipalities:

1. Achterwehr
2. Bredenbek
3. Felde
4. Krummwisch
5. Melsdorf
6. Ottendorf
7. Quarnbek
8. Westensee
