= Westensee =

- Municipality
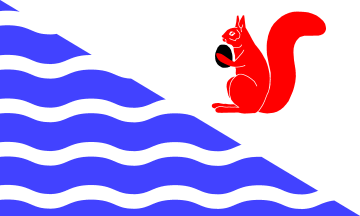
- Flag Coat of arms

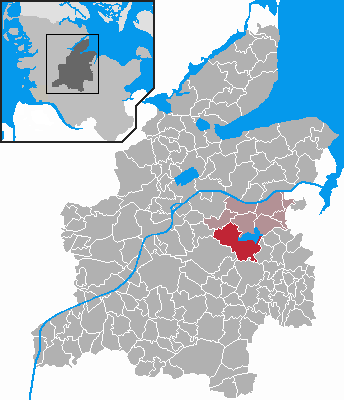
- Location of Westensee within Rendsburg-Eckernförde district
- Interactive map of Westensee
- Location within Germany Location within Schleswig-Holstein
- Coordinates: 54°16′N 9°54′E
- Country: Germany
- State: Schleswig-Holstein
- District: Rendsburg-Eckernförde
- Municipal assoc.: Achterwehr

Government
  - Mayor: Adolf Dibbern

Area
  - Total: 36.92 km^{2} (14.25 sq mi)
- Elevation: 19 m (62 ft)

Population (2025-12-31)
  - Total: 1,500
  - Density: 41/km^{2} (110/sq mi)
- Time zone: UTC+01:00 (CET)
  - Summer (DST): UTC+02:00 (CEST)
- Postal codes: 24259
- Dialling codes: 04305
- Vehicle registration: RD
- Website: www.amtachterwehr.de

Westensee (German pronunciation: [ˈvɛstn̩ˌzeː]) is a municipality in the district of Rendsburg-Eckernförde, in Schleswig-Holstein, Germany.

The location of Westensee is south of the municipality of Bredenbek or Felde, but north of Emkendorf or Langwedel, and west of Schierensee.
