= Ottendorf, Schleswig-Holstein =

Ottendorf
- Municipality
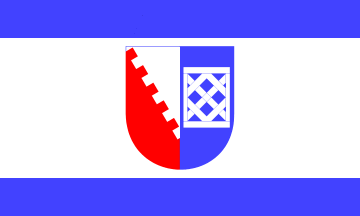
- Flag Coat of arms

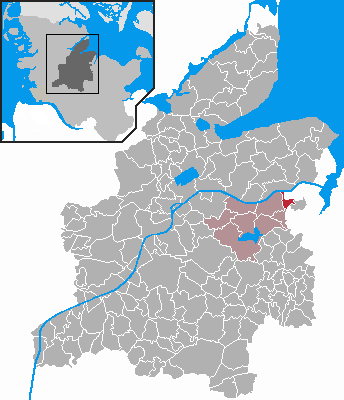
- Location of Ottendorf within Rendsburg-Eckernförde district
- Interactive map of Ottendorf
- Location within Germany Location within Schleswig-Holstein
- Coordinates: 54°21′N 10°3′E
- Country: Germany
- State: Schleswig-Holstein
- District: Rendsburg-Eckernförde
- Municipal assoc.: Achterwehr

Government
  - Mayor: Sabine Sager (CDU)

Area
  - Total: 3.55 km^{2} (1.37 sq mi)
- Elevation: 10 m (33 ft)

Population (2025-12-31)
  - Total: 966
  - Density: 272/km^{2} (705/sq mi)
- Time zone: UTC+01:00 (CET)
  - Summer (DST): UTC+02:00 (CEST)
- Postal codes: 24107
- Dialling codes: 0431
- Vehicle registration: RD
- Website: www.amt-achterwehr.de

Ottendorf (German pronunciation: [ˈɔtn̩dɔʁf]) is a municipality in the district of Rendsburg-Eckernförde, in Schleswig-Holstein, Germany.
