= Bargstall =

- Municipality
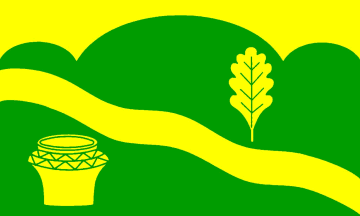
- Flag Coat of arms

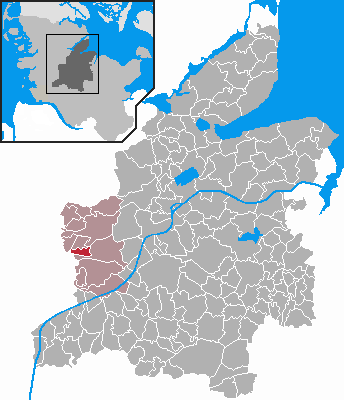
- Location of Bargstall within Rendsburg-Eckernförde district
- Interactive map of Bargstall
- Location within Germany Location within Schleswig-Holstein
- Coordinates: 54°15′45″N 9°27′0″E
- Country: Germany
- State: Schleswig-Holstein
- District: Rendsburg-Eckernförde
- Municipal assoc.: Hohner Harde

Government
  - Mayor: Erich Harder

Area
  - Total: 4.62 km^{2} (1.78 sq mi)
- Elevation: 5 m (16 ft)

Population (2025-12-31)
  - Total: 165
  - Density: 35.7/km^{2} (92.5/sq mi)
- Time zone: UTC+01:00 (CET)
  - Summer (DST): UTC+02:00 (CEST)
- Postal codes: 24806
- Dialling codes: 04335
- Vehicle registration: RD
- Website: www.amt-hohner- harde.de

Bargstall is a municipality in the district of Rendsburg-Eckernförde, in Schleswig-Holstein, Germany.
