= Friedrichsholm =

- Municipality
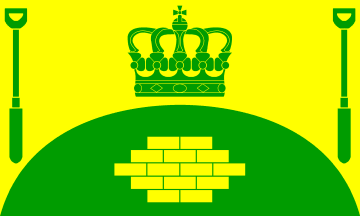
- Flag Coat of arms

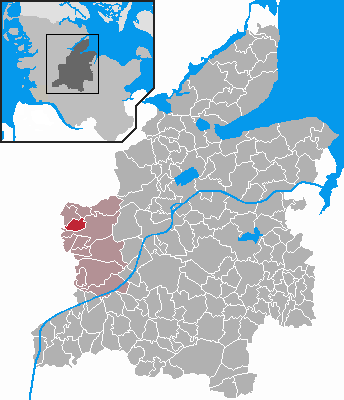
- Location of Friedrichsholm within Rendsburg-Eckernförde district
- Interactive map of Friedrichsholm
- Location within Germany Location within Schleswig-Holstein
- Coordinates: 54°18′20″N 9°25′43″E
- Country: Germany
- State: Schleswig-Holstein
- District: Rendsburg-Eckernförde
- Municipal assoc.: Hohner Harde

Government
  - Mayor: Jörg Rathje

Area
  - Total: 7.13 km^{2} (2.75 sq mi)
- Elevation: 10 m (33 ft)

Population (2025-12-31)
  - Total: 398
  - Density: 55.8/km^{2} (145/sq mi)
- Time zone: UTC+01:00 (CET)
  - Summer (DST): UTC+02:00 (CEST)
- Postal codes: 24799
- Dialling codes: 04339
- Vehicle registration: RD
- Website: www.amt-hohner- harde.de

Friedrichsholm is a municipality in the district of Rendsburg-Eckernförde, in Schleswig-Holstein, Germany.
