= Neuland Lighthouse =

Lighthouse in Schleswig-Holstein, Germany

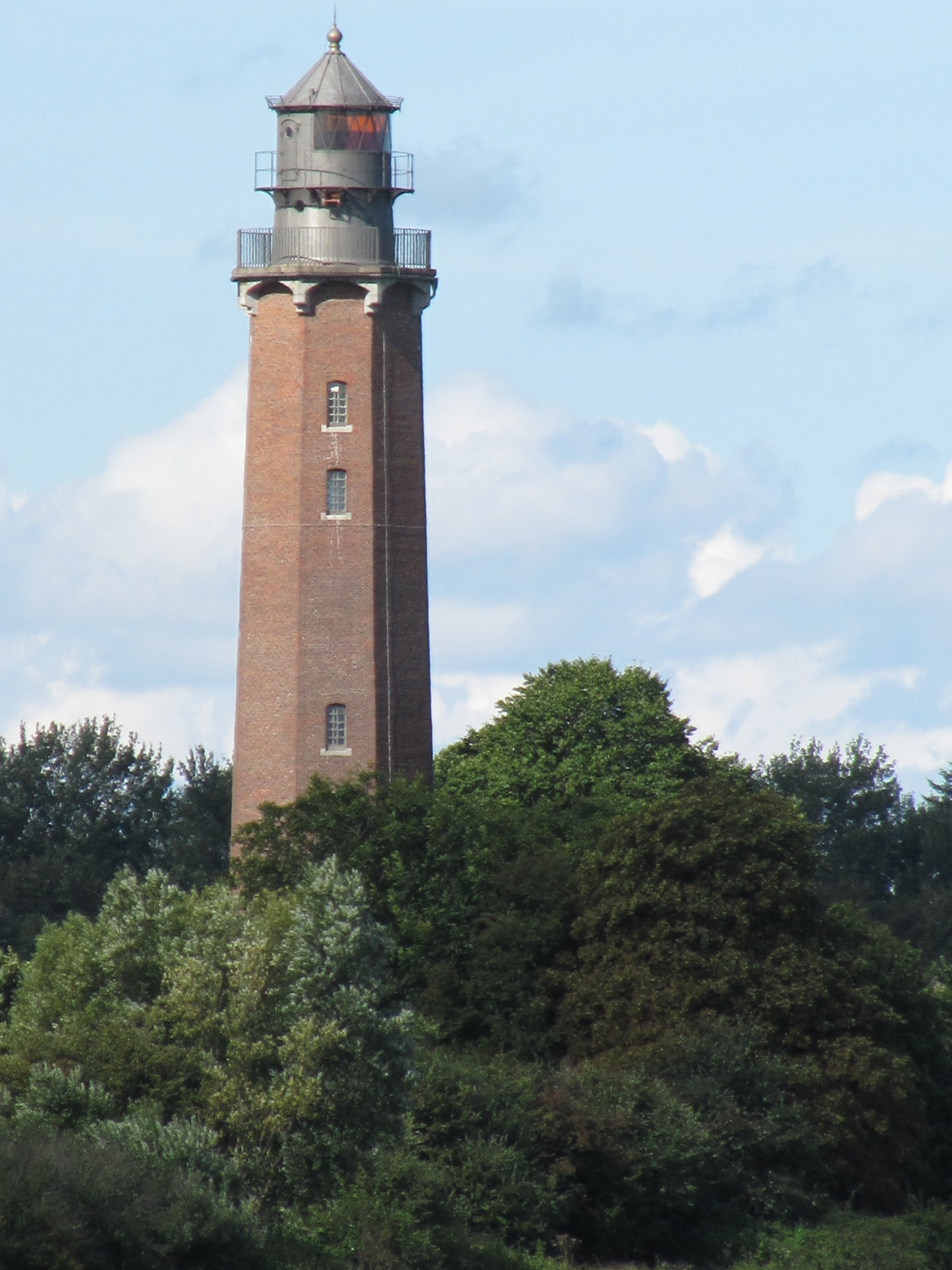
- Neuland Lighthouse from the southeast near Behrensdorf
- Location: Hohwacht Bay, Baltic Sea
- Coordinates: 54°21.639′N 10°36.056′E

Tower
- Constructed: 1916
- Construction: brick tower
- Height: 40 metres (131 ft)
- Shape: octagonal tower with balcony and lantern
- Markings: unpainted brick tower with grey lantern
- Heritage: Heritage monument in Schleswig-Holstein

Light
- First lit: 1918
- Deactivated: 1996
- Focal height: 40 metres (131 ft)
- Lens: Fresnel lens (original), rotating mirror (current)
- Characteristic: F YR 5s

Neuland Lighthouse (German: Leuchtturm Neuland) is a lighthouse in the north German state of Schleswig-Holstein on the Baltic Sea coast that was in service from 1918 to 1996. It stands on the western shore of Hohwacht Bay about 1 kilometre north of the village of Behrensdorf.

== History ==
The lighthouse was built in 1915/16 and taken into service in 1918. It is built of brick and is 40 metres high. The light is 40 metres above sea level. The original red and white exterior paint was removed in 1985 when the tower underwent a modernisation.

The original lens was a Fresnel lens with a focus of 400 m. It was replaced by a rotating mirror optic in 1996 when the regular light was deactivated and the tower was transferred to the German Navy. The tower has since been used as a warning light displaying red and yellow signals when live firing is conducted in the military training grounds at Hohwacht Bay.

The lighthouse is displayed in the arms of Behrensdorf and was featured on a German stamp in 2006.

Coat of arms of Behrensdorf

== See also ==
- List of lighthouses and lightvessels in Germany
