= Hohwacht =

- Municipality
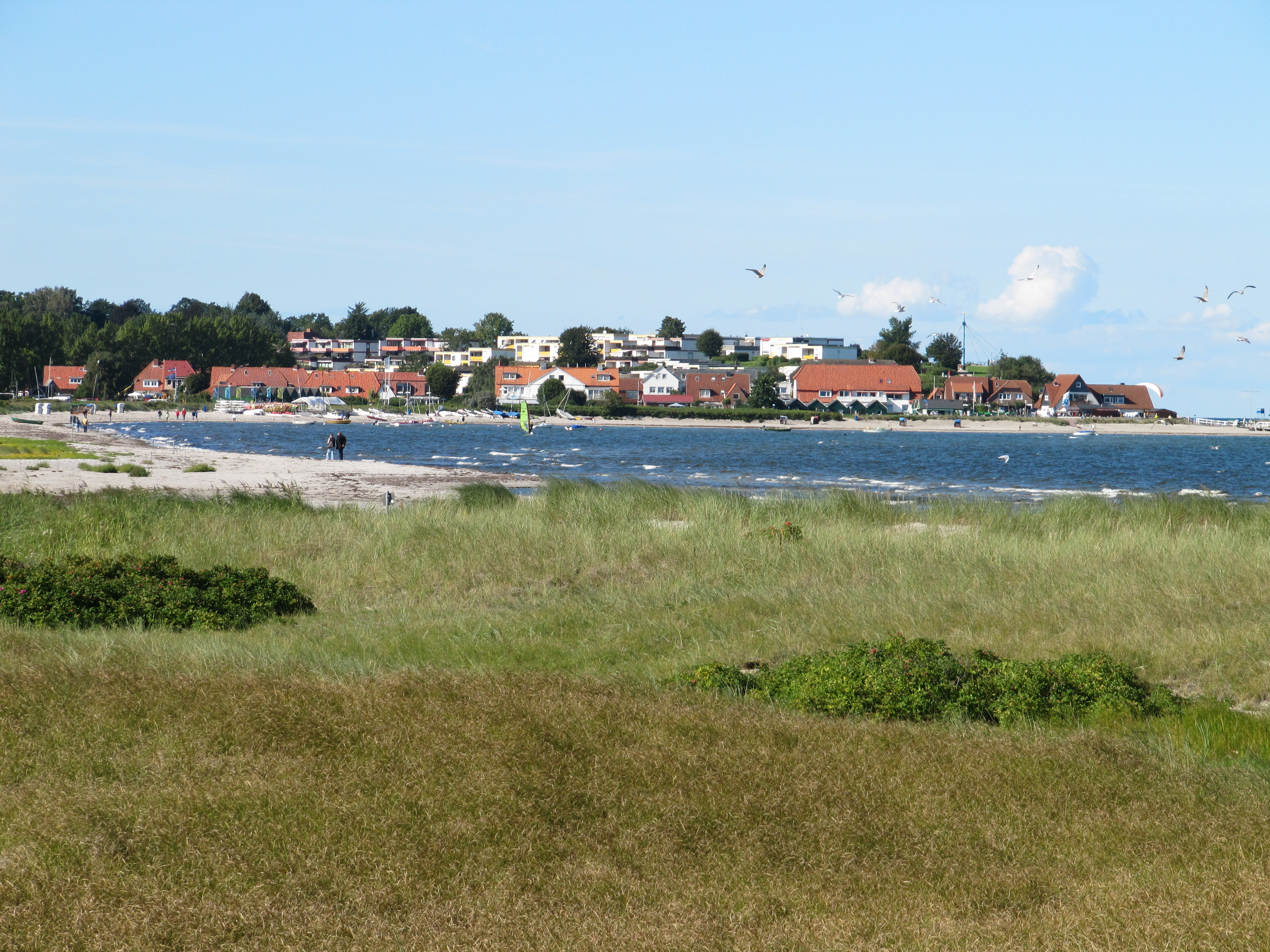

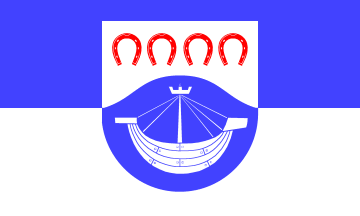
- Flag Coat of arms

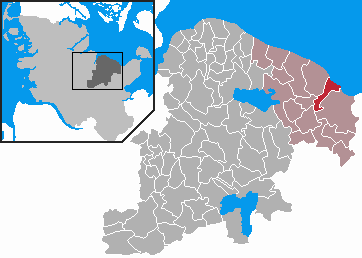
- Location of Hohwacht within Plön district
- Interactive map of Hohwacht
- Location within Germany Location within Schleswig-Holstein
- Coordinates: 54°19′1″N 10°40′3″E
- Country: Germany
- State: Schleswig-Holstein
- District: Plön
- Municipal assoc.: Lütjenburg

Government
  - Mayor: Matthias Potrafky

Area
  - Total: 8.77 km^{2} (3.39 sq mi)
- Elevation: 19 m (62 ft)

Population (2025-12-31)
  - Total: 792
  - Density: 90.3/km^{2} (234/sq mi)
- Time zone: UTC+01:00 (CET)
  - Summer (DST): UTC+02:00 (CEST)
- Postal codes: 24321
- Dialling codes: 04381
- Vehicle registration: PLÖ

Hohwacht (German pronunciation: [hoː'vaxt]) is a municipality in the district of Plön, in Schleswig-Holstein, Germany. It lies within the region of Wagria and its subordinate parishes are Hohwacht, Haßberg, Neudorf, Niedermühle and Schmiedendorf. The village was first mentioned in 1557 as Hohenwacht.

== Location ==
Hohwacht lies on the western shore of the Hohwacht Bay. The nearest large town is Oldenburg in Holstein.

== History ==
Hohwacht lost its original importance as a port at the end of the 19th century as a result of the newly built railway from Malente to Lütjenburg. But the railway also brought the first holidaymakers from the cities, especially to Haßberg, where the first resort was built, although it was closed again at the behest of the Neudorf estate.

Immediately after the First World War Hohwacht became a destination for artists around the painter, Karl Schmidt-Rottluff, and his biographer, Rosa Schapire, as well as Bernhard Hoetger, Curt Stoermer and Heinrich Vogeler. Schmidt-Rottluff used Hohwacht as his holiday home, mainly out of loyalty; Hohwacht was not an artist's village.

Towards the end of World War II a satellite concentration camp was located in the village centre. Here, 200 concentration camp prisoners and 300 forced labourers from 12 countries manufactured control parts for the V-2 rocket under SS supervision.

In 1976, passenger trains were withdrawn on the railway.

In 1986 Hohwacht was awarded the status of a Baltic health resort.

One attraction is the beach huts in the village, amongst the dunes, which have been preserved in their original state unlike anywhere else in Germany.

== Coat of arms ==
Emblazonment: "In silver beneath a row of four red horseshoes with their points downwards, a blue hill, raised in the centre and gently flattened on each sides, on which is a single-masted, sail-less silver vessel in the form of a historic seal."

== Neudorf Estate ==
The Neudorf Estate used to ship its grain from Alt-Hohwacht ("Old Hohwacht"). The manor house and several buildings of the estate are owned by the Buchwaldt family and have been preserved and classified as cultural monuments.

== Economy ==
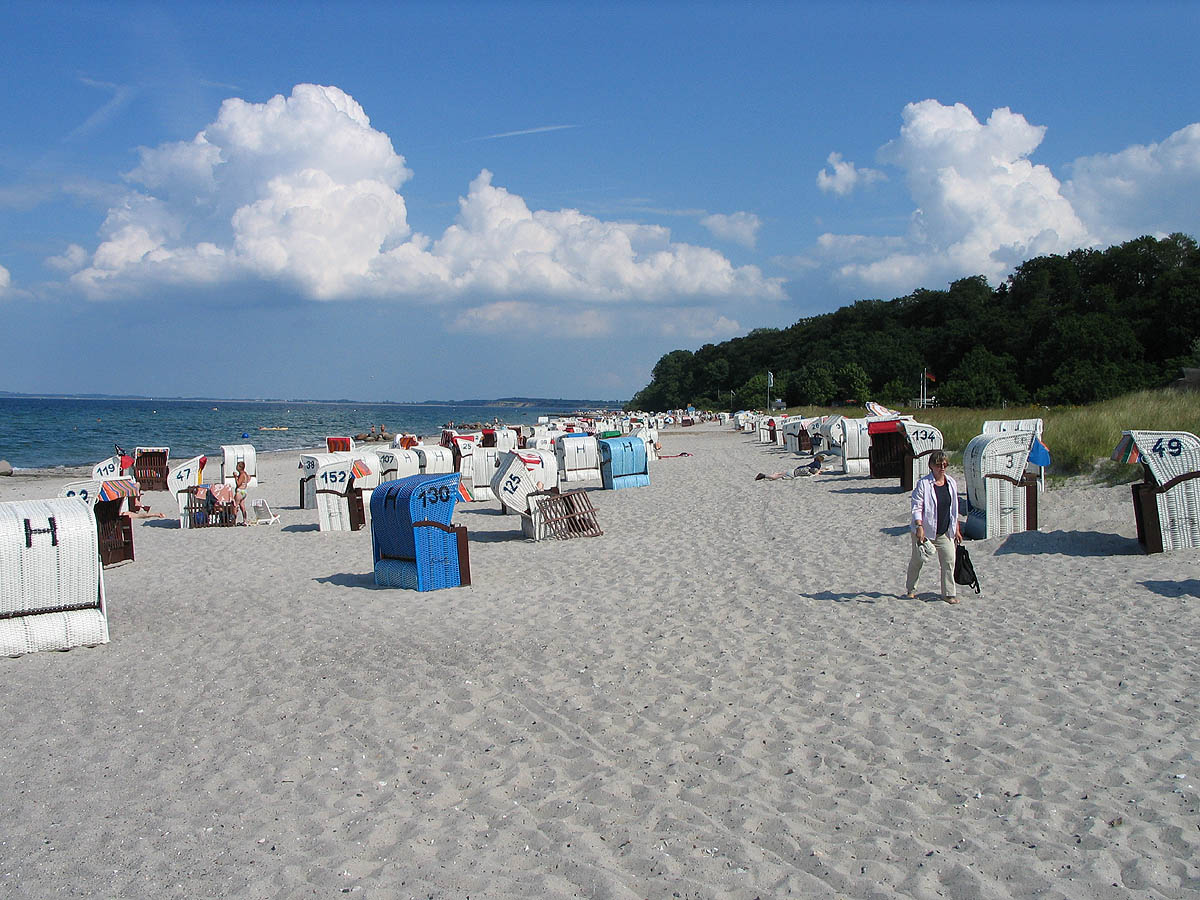
Baltic Sea beach in Hohwacht

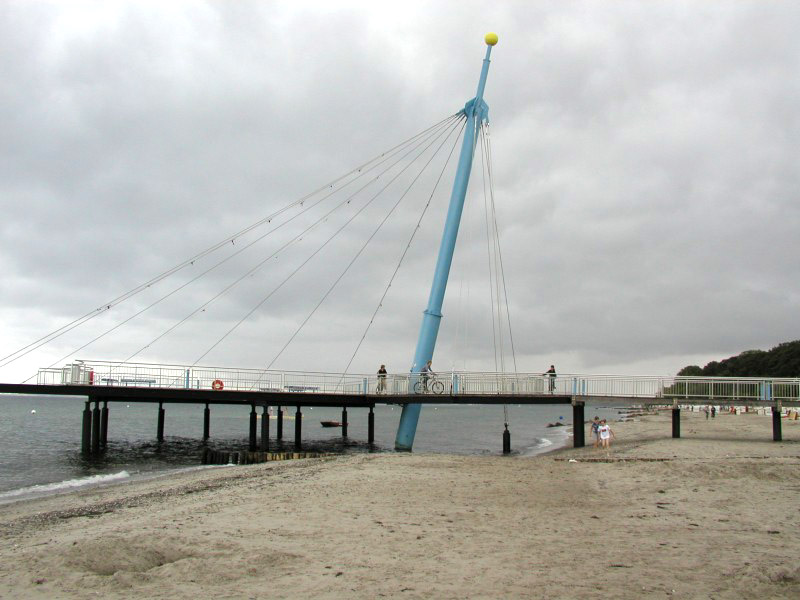
Hohwachter Flunder events stage

Originally Hohwacht was dominated by agriculture and fishing, now with its qualification as a seaside health resort, tourism is the main source of income.
