= Melsdorf =

- Municipality
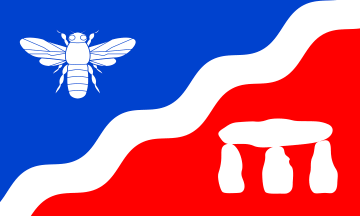
- Flag Coat of arms

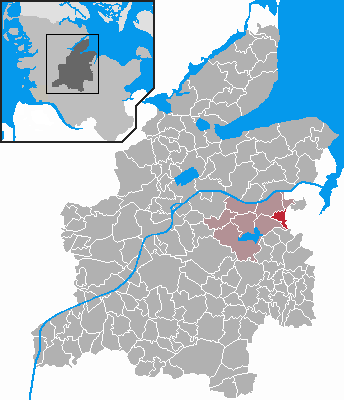
- Location of Melsdorf within Rendsburg-Eckernförde district
- Interactive map of Melsdorf
- Location within Germany Location within Schleswig-Holstein
- Coordinates: 54°19′2″N 10°1′52″E
- Country: Germany
- State: Schleswig-Holstein
- District: Rendsburg-Eckernförde
- Municipal assoc.: Achterwehr

Government
  - Mayor: Detlef Ufert

Area
  - Total: 5.86 km^{2} (2.26 sq mi)
- Elevation: 20 m (66 ft)

Population (2025-12-31)
  - Total: 2,071
  - Density: 353/km^{2} (915/sq mi)
- Time zone: UTC+01:00 (CET)
  - Summer (DST): UTC+02:00 (CEST)
- Postal codes: 24109
- Dialling codes: 04340
- Vehicle registration: RD
- Website: www.amtachterwehr.de

Melsdorf is a municipality in the district of Rendsburg-Eckernförde, in Schleswig-Holstein, Germany.
