= Sophienhamm =

- Municipality
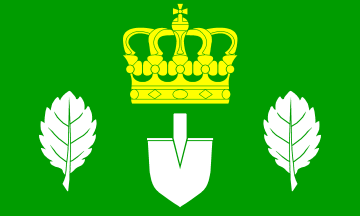
- Flag Coat of arms

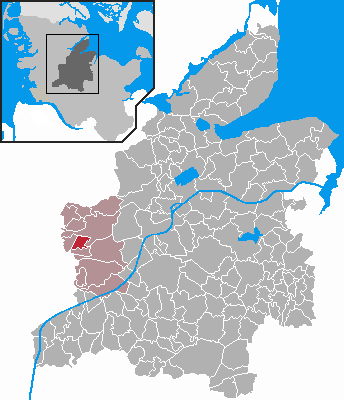
- Location of Sophienhamm within Rendsburg-Eckernförde district
- Interactive map of Sophienhamm
- Location within Germany Location within Schleswig-Holstein
- Coordinates: 54°16′N 9°28′E
- Country: Germany
- State: Schleswig-Holstein
- District: Rendsburg-Eckernförde
- Municipal assoc.: Hohner Harde

Government
  - Mayor: Jörg Butenschön

Area
  - Total: 5.91 km^{2} (2.28 sq mi)
- Elevation: 10 m (33 ft)

Population (2025-12-31)
  - Total: 305
  - Density: 51.6/km^{2} (134/sq mi)
- Time zone: UTC+01:00 (CET)
  - Summer (DST): UTC+02:00 (CEST)
- Postal codes: 24806
- Dialling codes: 04335
- Vehicle registration: RD
- Website: www.amt-hohner- harde.de

Sophienhamm is a municipality in the district of Rendsburg-Eckernförde, in Schleswig-Holstein, Germany.
