= Quarnbek =

- Municipality
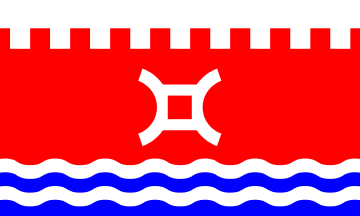
- Flag Coat of arms

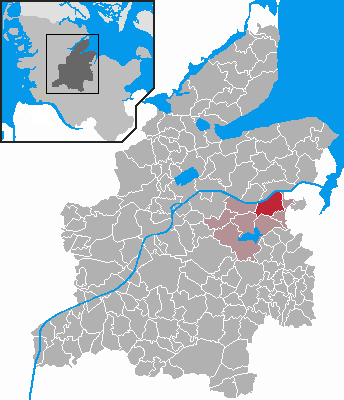
- Location of Quarnbek within Rendsburg-Eckernförde district
- Interactive map of Quarnbek
- Location within Germany Location within Schleswig-Holstein
- Coordinates: 54°19′N 9°58′E
- Country: Germany
- State: Schleswig-Holstein
- District: Rendsburg-Eckernförde
- Municipal assoc.: Achterwehr

Government
  - Mayor: Herbert-Klaus Langer (Greens)

Area
  - Total: 16.18 km^{2} (6.25 sq mi)
- Elevation: 15 m (49 ft)

Population (2025-12-31)
  - Total: 1,721
  - Density: 106.4/km^{2} (275.5/sq mi)
- Time zone: UTC+01:00 (CET)
  - Summer (DST): UTC+02:00 (CEST)
- Postal codes: 24107
- Dialling codes: 04340
- Vehicle registration: RD

Quarnbek (German pronunciation: [ˈkvaʁnbeːk]) is a municipality in the district of Rendsburg-Eckernförde, in Schleswig-Holstein, Germany.
