= Brinjahe =

Municipality in Schleswig-Holstein, Germany

- Municipality
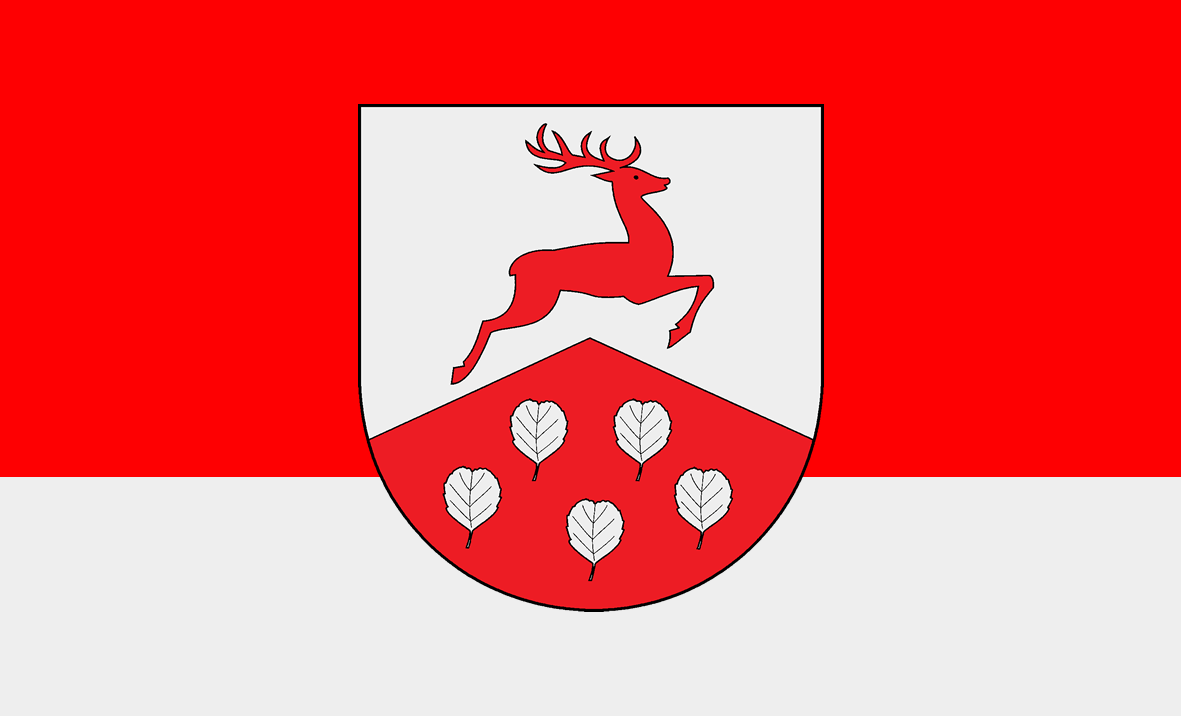
- Flag Coat of arms

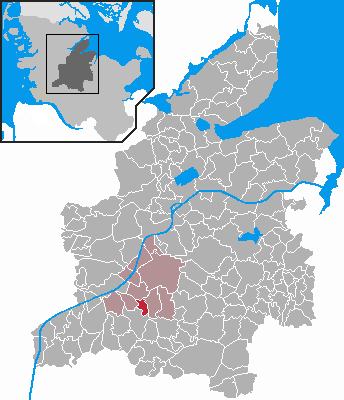
- Location of Brinjahe within Rendsburg-Eckernförde district
- Interactive map of Brinjahe
- Location within Germany Location within Schleswig-Holstein
- Coordinates: 54°10′N 9°38′E
- Country: Germany
- State: Schleswig-Holstein
- District: Rendsburg-Eckernförde
- Municipal assoc.: Jevenstedt

Government
  - Mayor: Edlef Backsen

Area
  - Total: 4.66 km^{2} (1.80 sq mi)
- Elevation: 10 m (33 ft)

Population (2025-12-31)
  - Total: 111
  - Density: 23.8/km^{2} (61.7/sq mi)
- Time zone: UTC+01:00 (CET)
  - Summer (DST): UTC+02:00 (CEST)
- Postal codes: 24816
- Dialling codes: 04875
- Vehicle registration: RD
- Website: www.amt-jevenstedt.de

Brinjahe is a municipality in the district of Rendsburg-Eckernförde, in Schleswig-Holstein, Germany.
