= Hohwacht Bay =

Bay in Schleswig-Holstein, Germany

Coordinates: 54°20′33″N 10°44′21″E

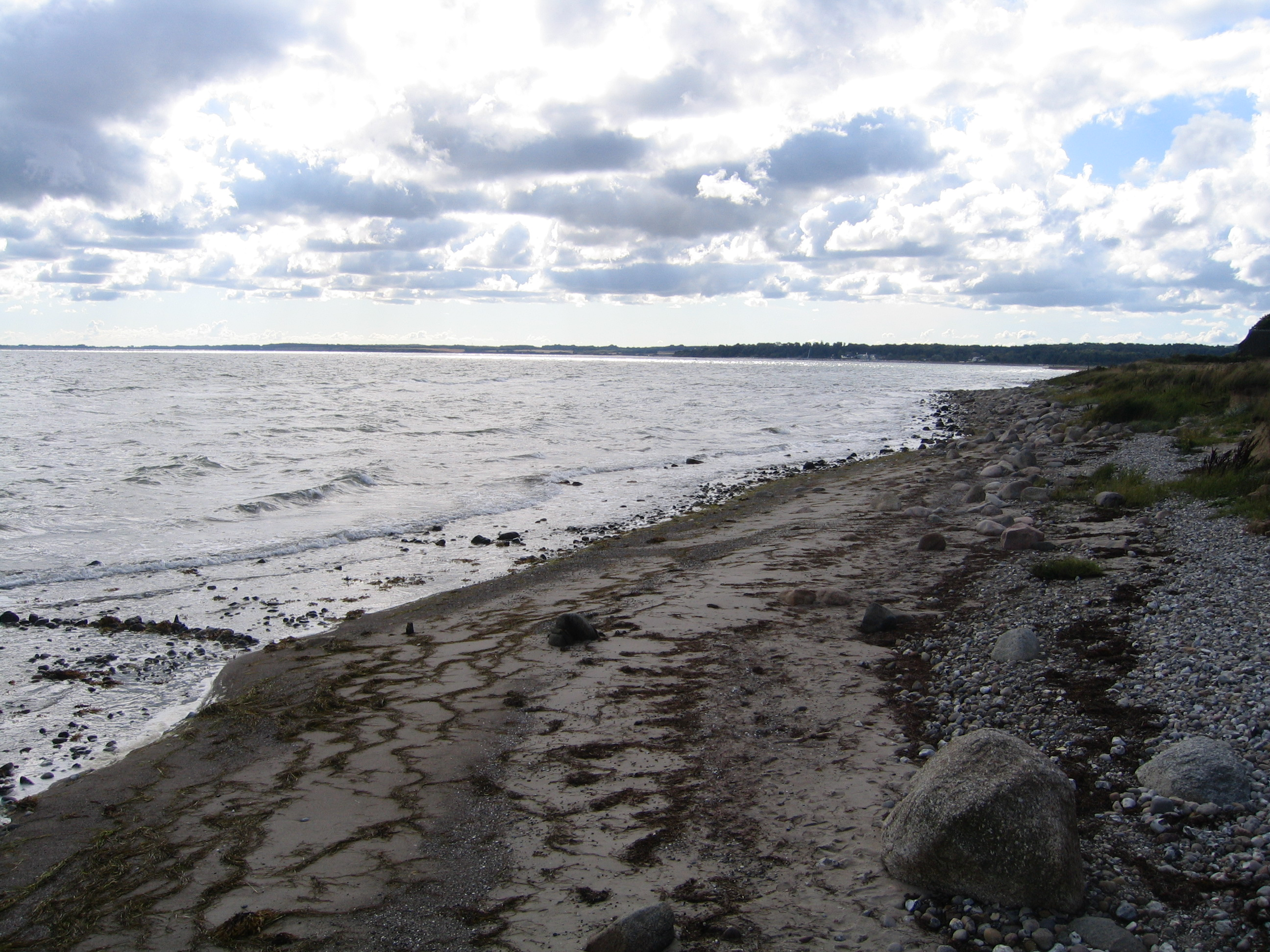
Hohwacht Bay from the west near the Kleiner Binnensee

Hohwacht Bay (German: Hohwachter Bucht) is a wide bay in the state of Schleswig-Holstein on Germany's Baltic Sea coastline. It is named after the village and seaside resort of Hohwacht. The nearest large town is Oldenburg in Holstein, about 5 kilometres inland. A number of nature reserves fringe the bay and there is a military training area along its eastern shore.

On the western shore, about 1 kilometre north of Behrensdorf, stands the ninety-year-old Neuland Lighthouse which is used as a warning light by the military training facilities.
