= Elsdorf-Westermühlen =

- Municipality
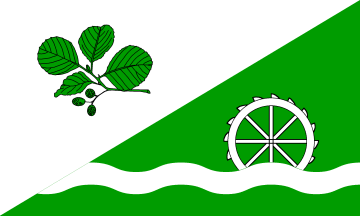
- Flag Coat of arms

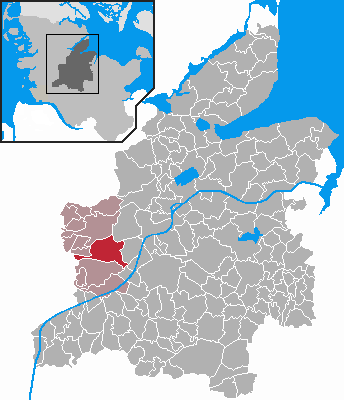
- Location of Elsdorf-Westermühlen within Rendsburg-Eckernförde district
- Interactive map of Elsdorf-Westermühlen
- Location within Germany Location within Schleswig-Holstein
- Coordinates: 54°16′N 9°31′E
- Country: Germany
- State: Schleswig-Holstein
- District: Rendsburg-Eckernförde
- Municipal assoc.: Hohner Harde

Government
  - Mayor: Petra Lorenzen

Area
  - Total: 27.48 km^{2} (10.61 sq mi)
- Elevation: 11 m (36 ft)

Population (2025-12-31)
  - Total: 1,587
  - Density: 57.75/km^{2} (149.6/sq mi)
- Time zone: UTC+01:00 (CET)
  - Summer (DST): UTC+02:00 (CEST)
- Postal codes: 24800
- Dialling codes: 04332
- Vehicle registration: RD, ECK
- Website: www.amt-hohner- harde.de

Elsdorf-Westermühlen is a municipality in the district of Rendsburg-Eckernförde, in Schleswig-Holstein, Germany.
