= Friedrichsgraben =

- Municipality
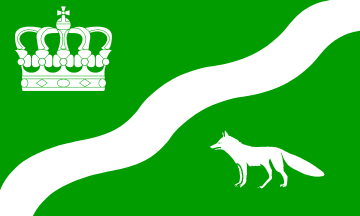
- Flag Coat of arms

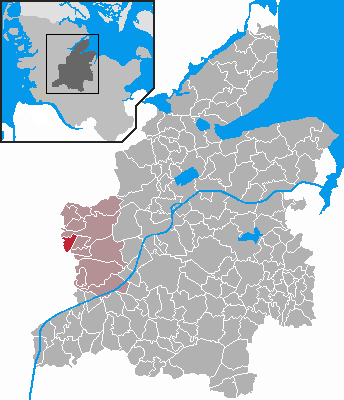
- Location of Friedrichsgraben within Rendsburg-Eckernförde district
- Interactive map of Friedrichsgraben
- Location within Germany Location within Schleswig-Holstein
- Coordinates: 54°16′N 9°25′E
- Country: Germany
- State: Schleswig-Holstein
- District: Rendsburg-Eckernförde
- Municipal assoc.: Hohner Harde

Government
  - Mayor: Helmuth Kuhrt

Area
  - Total: 5.39 km^{2} (2.08 sq mi)
- Elevation: 3 m (9.8 ft)

Population (2025-12-31)
  - Total: 47
  - Density: 8.7/km^{2} (23/sq mi)
- Time zone: UTC+01:00 (CET)
  - Summer (DST): UTC+02:00 (CEST)
- Postal codes: 24799
- Dialling codes: 04339
- Vehicle registration: RD
- Website: www.amt-hohner- harde.de

Friedrichsgraben is a municipality in the district of Rendsburg-Eckernförde, in Schleswig-Holstein, Germany.
