= Königshügel =

- Municipality
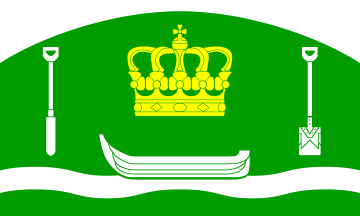
- Flag Coat of arms

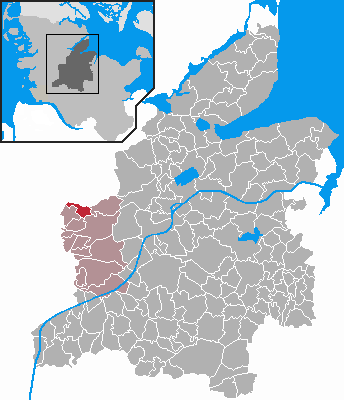
- Location of Königshügel within Rendsburg-Eckernförde district
- Interactive map of Königshügel
- Location within Germany Location within Schleswig-Holstein
- Coordinates: 54°19′N 9°28′E
- Country: Germany
- State: Schleswig-Holstein
- District: Rendsburg-Eckernförde
- Municipal assoc.: Hohner Harde

Government
  - Mayor: Günther Bethke

Area
  - Total: 6.26 km^{2} (2.42 sq mi)
- Elevation: 2 m (6.6 ft)

Population (2025-12-31)
  - Total: 165
  - Density: 26.4/km^{2} (68.3/sq mi)
- Time zone: UTC+01:00 (CET)
  - Summer (DST): UTC+02:00 (CEST)
- Postal codes: 24799
- Dialling codes: 04339
- Vehicle registration: RD
- Website: www.amt-hohner- harde.de

Königshügel is a municipality in the district of Rendsburg-Eckernförde, in Schleswig-Holstein, Germany.
