= Achterwehr =

- Municipality
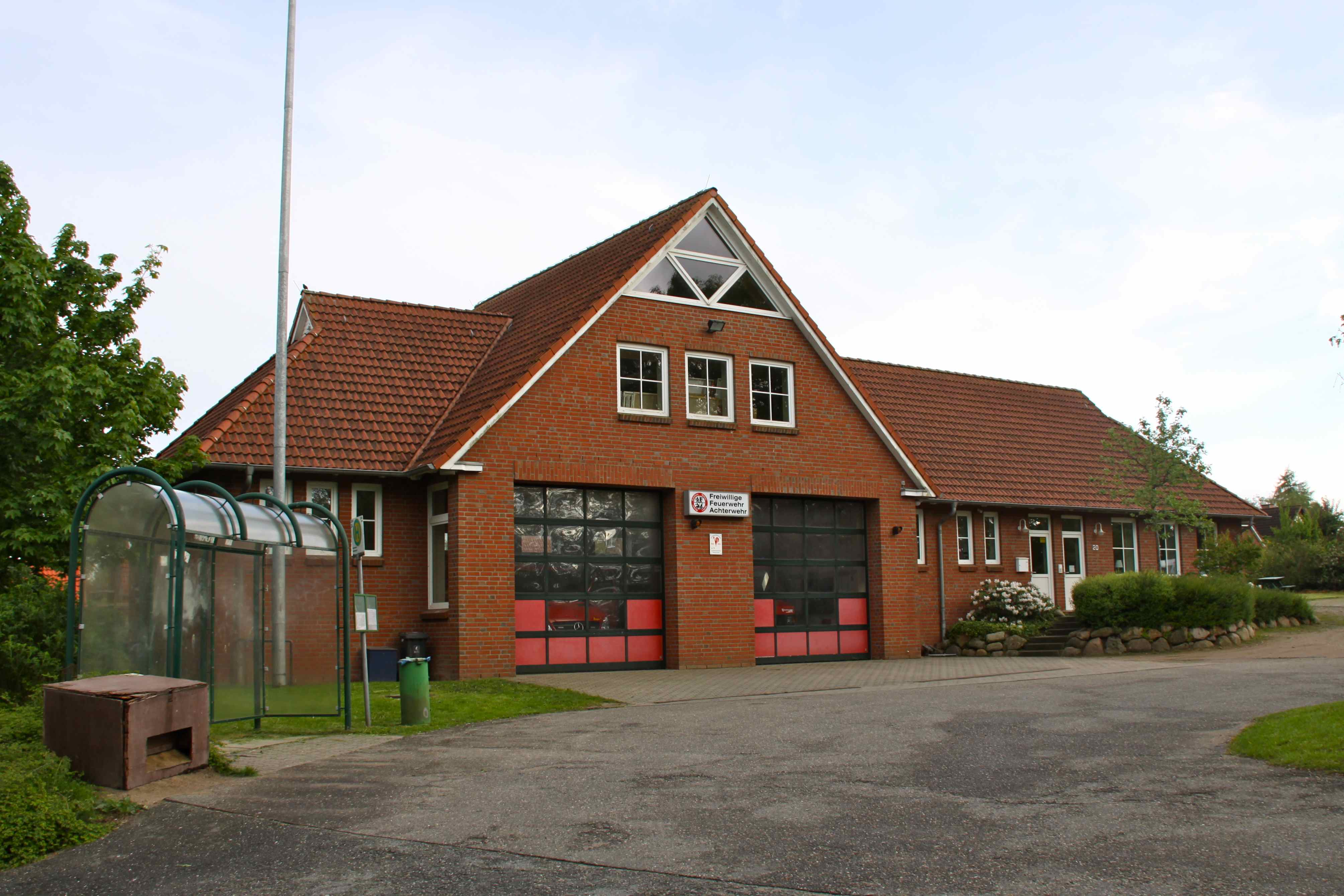
- Fire station in Achterwehr

- Coat of arms

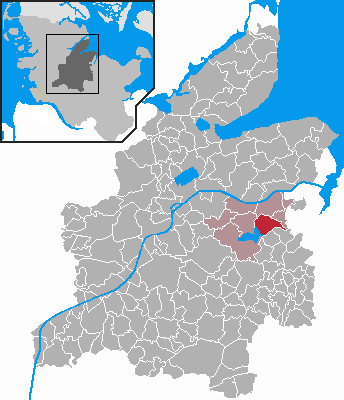
- Location of Achterwehr within Rendsburg-Eckernförde district
- Interactive map of Achterwehr
- Location within Germany Location within Schleswig-Holstein
- Coordinates: 54°19′N 9°58′E
- Country: Germany
- State: Schleswig-Holstein
- District: Rendsburg-Eckernförde
- Municipal assoc.: Achterwehr

Government
  - Mayor: Anne Katrin Kittmann (SPD)

Area
  - Total: 15.65 km^{2} (6.04 sq mi)
- Elevation: 29 m (95 ft)

Population (2025-12-31)
  - Total: 1,037
  - Density: 66.26/km^{2} (171.6/sq mi)
- Time zone: UTC+01:00 (CET)
  - Summer (DST): UTC+02:00 (CEST)
- Postal codes: 24239
- Dialling codes: 04340
- Vehicle registration: RD
- Website: www.amtachterwehr.de

Achterwehr is a municipality, located in the district of Rendsburg-Eckernförde in the German Bundesland of Schleswig-Holstein.

Achterwehr is situated 12 km west of Kiel and about 5 km south of the Kiel Canal (German: Nord-Ostsee-Kanal). The Autobahn 210 from Kiel to Rendsburg passes to the north of Achterwehr, and the river Eider crosses it.

Achterwehr is the seat of the Amt ("collective municipality") Achterwehr.
