= Schülp bei Rendsburg =

- Municipality
- Flag Coat of arms

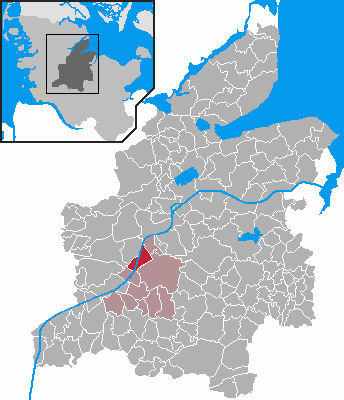
- Location of Schülp bei Rendsburg within Rendsburg-Eckernförde district
- Interactive map of Schülp bei Rendsburg
- Location within Germany Location within Schleswig-Holstein
- Coordinates: 54°15′36″N 9°37′47″E
- Country: Germany
- State: Schleswig-Holstein
- District: Rendsburg-Eckernförde
- Municipal assoc.: Jevenstedt

Government
  - Mayor: Otto Schneider (CDU)

Area
  - Total: 10.72 km^{2} (4.14 sq mi)
- Elevation: 7 m (23 ft)

Population (2025-12-31)
  - Total: 1,046
  - Density: 97.57/km^{2} (252.7/sq mi)
- Time zone: UTC+01:00 (CET)
  - Summer (DST): UTC+02:00 (CEST)
- Postal codes: 24813
- Dialling codes: 04331
- Vehicle registration: RD
- Website: www.amt- jevenstedt.de

Schülp bei Rendsburg (German pronunciation: [ˈʃʏlp baɪ ˈʁɛntsbʊʁk], lit. 'Schülp near Rendsburg') is a municipality in the district of Rendsburg-Eckernförde, in Schleswig-Holstein, Germany.

The village lies on a sandy elevation directly south-west of Rendsburg on both sides of the Kiel Canal, the water way that connects the North Sea with the Baltic Sea. Schülp is roughly at the half-way mark of the Kiel Canal and there is a pilot station in Schülp where the pilots that accompany ships on their journey through the canal change.

== History ==
Some flint artifacts (scrapers, hatchets) from the Neolithic period (around 4300–2300 BC) are the oldest traces in today's municipal area.

It is unknown when exactly the settlement from which today's Schülp originated was founded. In any case, it was located on a ford of the Eider, which was important for north–south traffic across the Jutian peninsula (Bernsteinweg / Ochsenweg). The chronicler Helmold von Bosau (before 1120 to after 1177) reports in his Slavic Chronicle that around 1149 the Holstein Count Adolf II fought a battle with Danes and Dithmarschers near Schülp. The battlefield was located around the northern municipal boundary, where an Eider ferry ran until the Kiel Canal was built. From the north, the Heerweg met an easily passable ford coming from the direction of Nübbel.

The next written records about Schülp only come back from the 15th century: In a complaint in 1447, Count Adolf VIII mentioned the attacks by the Dithmarschers in the Holstein area. Schülp would fall victim to the looting. The place was mentioned in German writing for the first time on that occasion and was called "Schulpe".

The village was subordinate to the Rendsburg district in 1580, which at that time belonged to the royal Danish part of the duchies of Schleswig and Holstein. For example, the inhabitants of Schülpe had to contribute to the construction of the Rendsburg fortress since the 16th century, which was expanded to the strongest Danish fortress but for Copenhagen in the 17th century.

In 1712, a plague epidemic swept away all but two families. The plague cemetery created at that time is still used today.

The first reliable number of inhabitants, 110, was documented in 1803. The place benefited from the Schleswig-Holstein Canal (Eider Canal), built in 1777 to 1784, which among other things led to the development of a small shipyard industry on the Eider.

In 1867, The Prussian rural community ordinance transformed the village community of Schülp into a community with an elected community leader.

The time from 1887 to 1895 saw the construction of the Kiel Canal, which divided the municipal area from then on. Until 1973, a chain ferry operated between the districts of Rüsterbergen.

The Rendsburg circular railway connected Schülp with Rendsburg between 1901 and 1957.

== Sights ==
- Museum of local history with "Prussian registrar's office"
- Pestilence cemetery
- Moltkestein
- Maritime pilot station Nübbel
- Maritime pilot station Rüsterbergen (until November 1973 docking place for the ferry to the Moltkestein on the north bank of the canal)
- Rüsterberg
