= Lütjenburg =

- Town
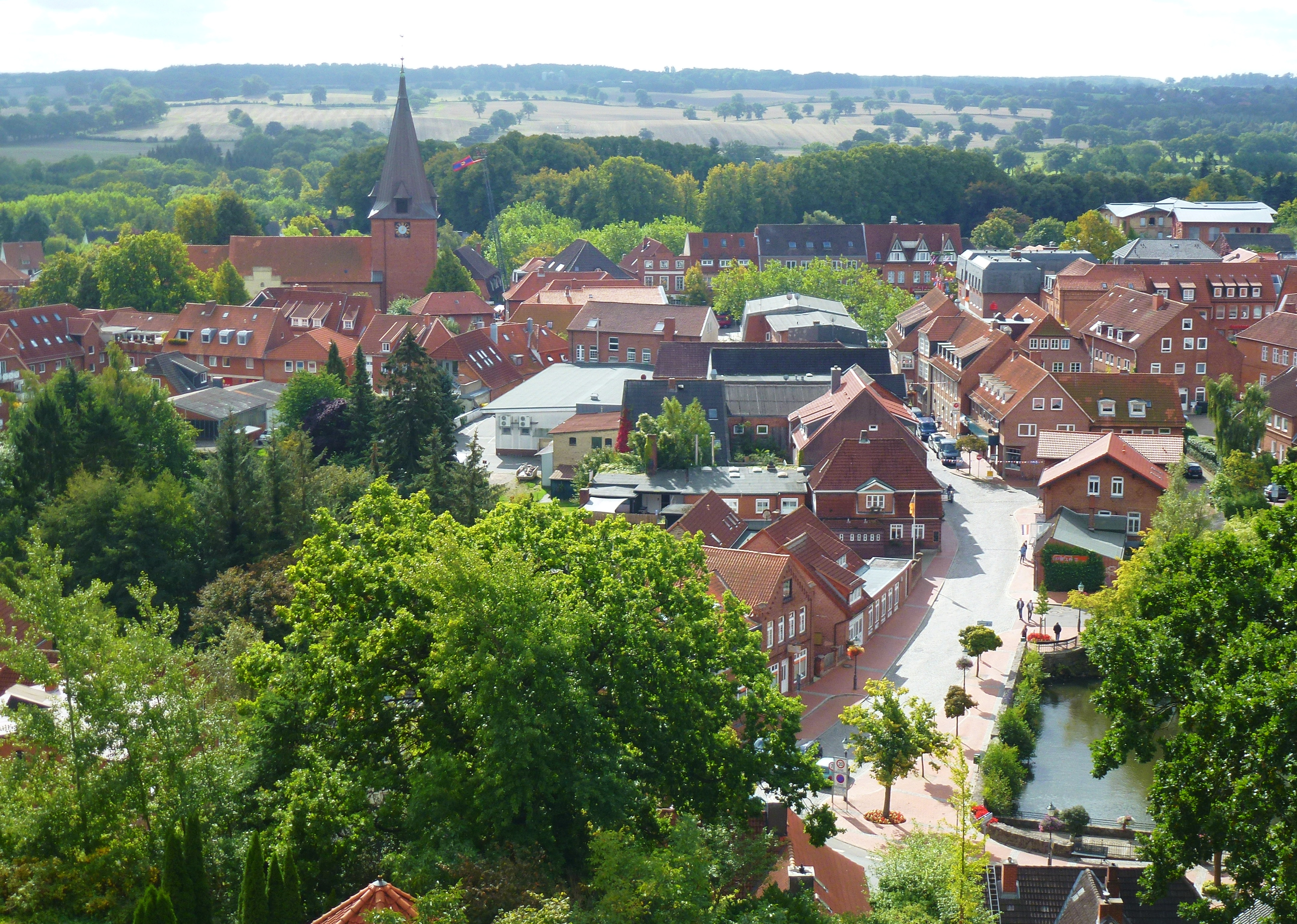
- Aerial view of Lütjenburg

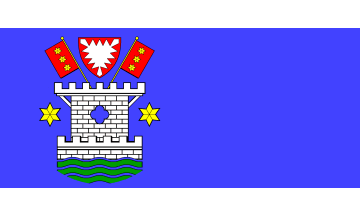
- Flag Coat of arms

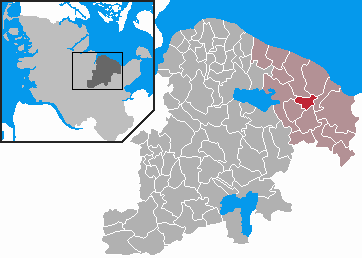
- Location of Lütjenburg within Plön district
- Interactive map of Lütjenburg
- Location within Germany Location within Schleswig-Holstein
- Coordinates: 54°17′41″N 10°35′29″E
- Country: Germany
- State: Schleswig-Holstein
- District: Plön
- Municipal assoc.: Lütjenburg

Government
  - Mayor: Dirk Sohn (CDU)

Area
  - Total: 6.15 km^{2} (2.37 sq mi)
- Elevation: 33 m (108 ft)

Population (2025-12-31)
  - Total: 5,396
  - Density: 877/km^{2} (2,270/sq mi)
- Time zone: UTC+01:00 (CET)
  - Summer (DST): UTC+02:00 (CEST)
- Postal codes: 24321
- Dialling codes: 04381
- Vehicle registration: PLÖ
- Website: www.stadt- luetjenburg.de

Lütjenburg (German pronunciation: [ˈlʏtjənˌbʊʁk]; Low German: Lüttenborg) is a town of the district of Plön, Schleswig-Holstein, Germany. It is located approximately 18 km (11 mi) northeast of Plön, and 30 km (19 mi) east of Kiel.

== History ==
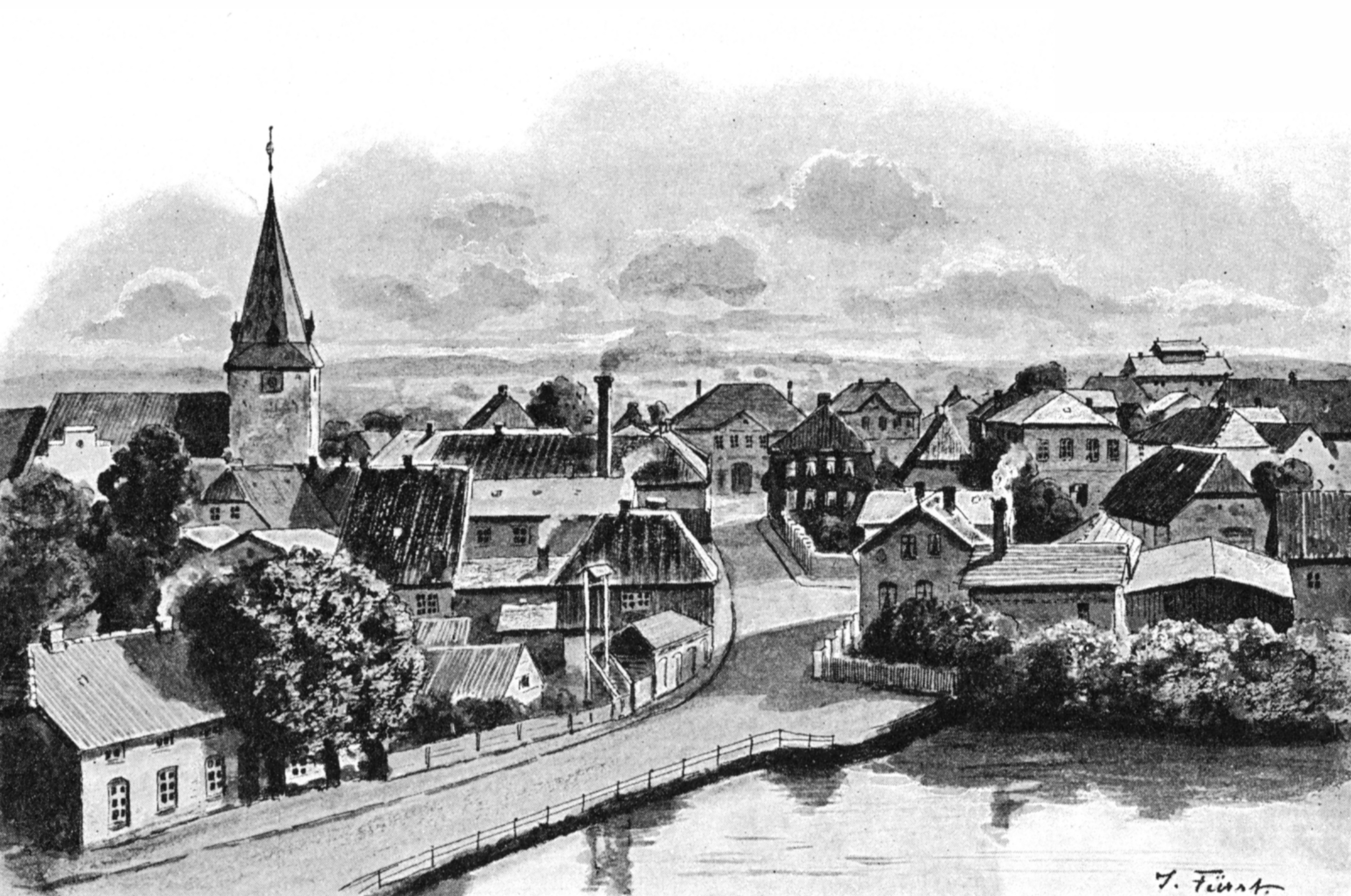
Lütjenburg in 1895

Lütjenburg was founded in the 12th century by Lord Holstein as a result of the conquest of the old territories of the Slavic peoples.

== Politics ==
Since the local election in 2021, the CDU has ten and the SPD nine seats in the 19-seats city council of Lütjenburg.

The member of the Bundestag for the electoral district of Plön-Neumünster is Kristian Klinck (SPD).

== Economy ==
Due to the closeness to the Ostseebad Hohwacht many tourists visit Lütjenburg as well, to do some shopping or to visit the landmark of Lütjenburg, the "Bismarck Tower".

The 6th. antiaircraft regiment of the Bundeswehr was located in Lütjenburg till 2012, too. The Bundeswehr was the biggest employer in this region.

== Education ==
Lütjenburg has an elementary school and, by now, still all other, continuative schools, the "Hauptschule" (a kind of general Junior High School, for non-intellectually gifted students), "Realschule" (Junior High School), "Gymnasium" (Senior High School). They are united in the "Schulzentrum Lütjenburg", a center of all these three continuative schools. But they are just united regarding the location. A special school (for intellectually challenged students), "Otto-Mensing-Schule" is also located in Lütjenburg.

== Twin cities ==
- Rakvere (Estonia)
- (Germany) Sternberg (Mecklenburg-Western Pomerania)
- Bain-de-Bretagne (France)
- Ulyanovo (Russia, Kaliningrad Oblast)
