= Bredenbek =

- Municipality
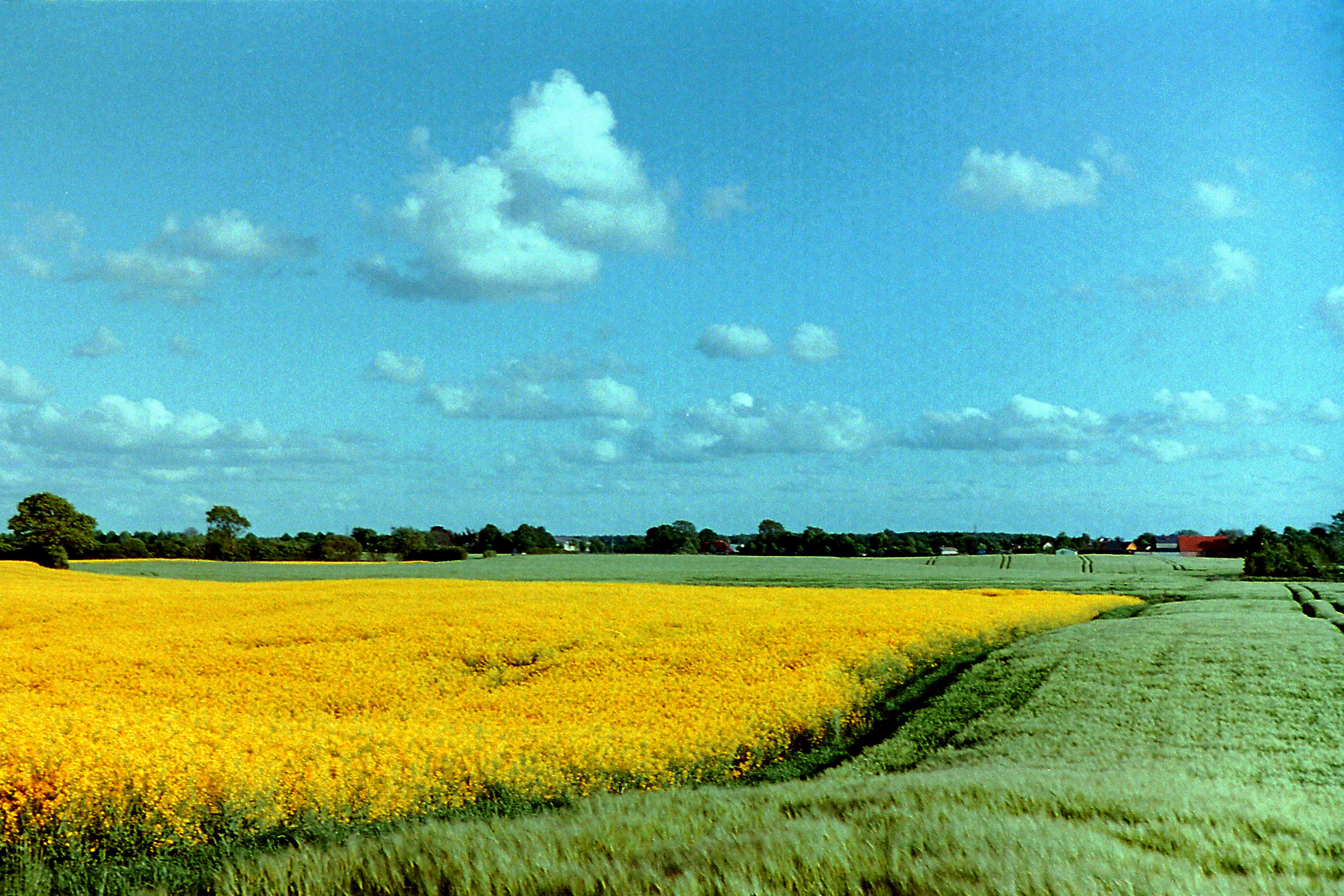

- Flag Coat of arms

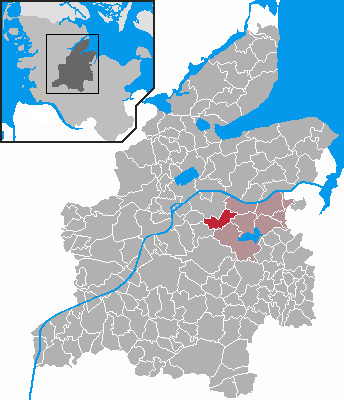
- Location of Bredenbek within Rendsburg-Eckernförde district
- Interactive map of Bredenbek
- Location within Germany Location within Schleswig-Holstein
- Coordinates: 54°19′N 9°52′E
- Country: Germany
- State: Schleswig-Holstein
- District: Rendsburg-Eckernförde
- Municipal assoc.: Achterwehr

Government
  - Mayor: Hans-Werner Hamann (SPD)

Area
  - Total: 12.43 km^{2} (4.80 sq mi)
- Elevation: 14 m (46 ft)

Population (2025-12-31)
  - Total: 1,540
  - Density: 124/km^{2} (321/sq mi)
- Time zone: UTC+01:00 (CET)
  - Summer (DST): UTC+02:00 (CEST)
- Postal codes: 24796
- Dialling codes: 04334
- Vehicle registration: RD
- Website: www.amtachterwehr.de

Bredenbek is a municipality, located in the district of Rendsburg-Eckernförde in the German Bundesland of Schleswig-Holstein.

Bredenbek is part of the Amt ("collective municipality") Achterwehr.

== Geography ==
Bredenbek is situated about 18 km west of Kiel and 15 km east of Rendsburg. The highway "Autobahn 210" from Kiel to Rendsburg passes near the south of the village. The Kiel Canal passes about 2 km to the north.

== History ==
Bredenbek was first mentioned in the year 1264 in the town's book of Kiel, named as "de Bradenbeke".

== Origin of the name ==
The name of "Bredenbek" consists of two Low German words, brede for "flat" and bek for "creek". The original Bredenbek creek, a feeder of the Eider River, once flowed through the area of the village, but nowadays flows underground through pipes.

== Education ==
Currently 96 children, from the 1st to the 4th grade, attend the primary school, which is situated at the center of the village. Furthermore, there is a kindergarten in Bredenbek.

== Town partnerships ==
- Walcott, Iowa, in the United States of America
- Brandshagen, near Stralsund in Germany

== Notable people ==
- Eric Braeden, an actor in the United States, was born and grew up in Bredenbek. Since 1998 Eric Braeden has been an honorary citizen of Bredenbek.

== Literature ==
- Gemeinde Chronik - (German language) Published in August 2003, containing 227 pages of information collected by the Arbeitsgruppe Dorfchronik.
