= Felde =

- Municipality
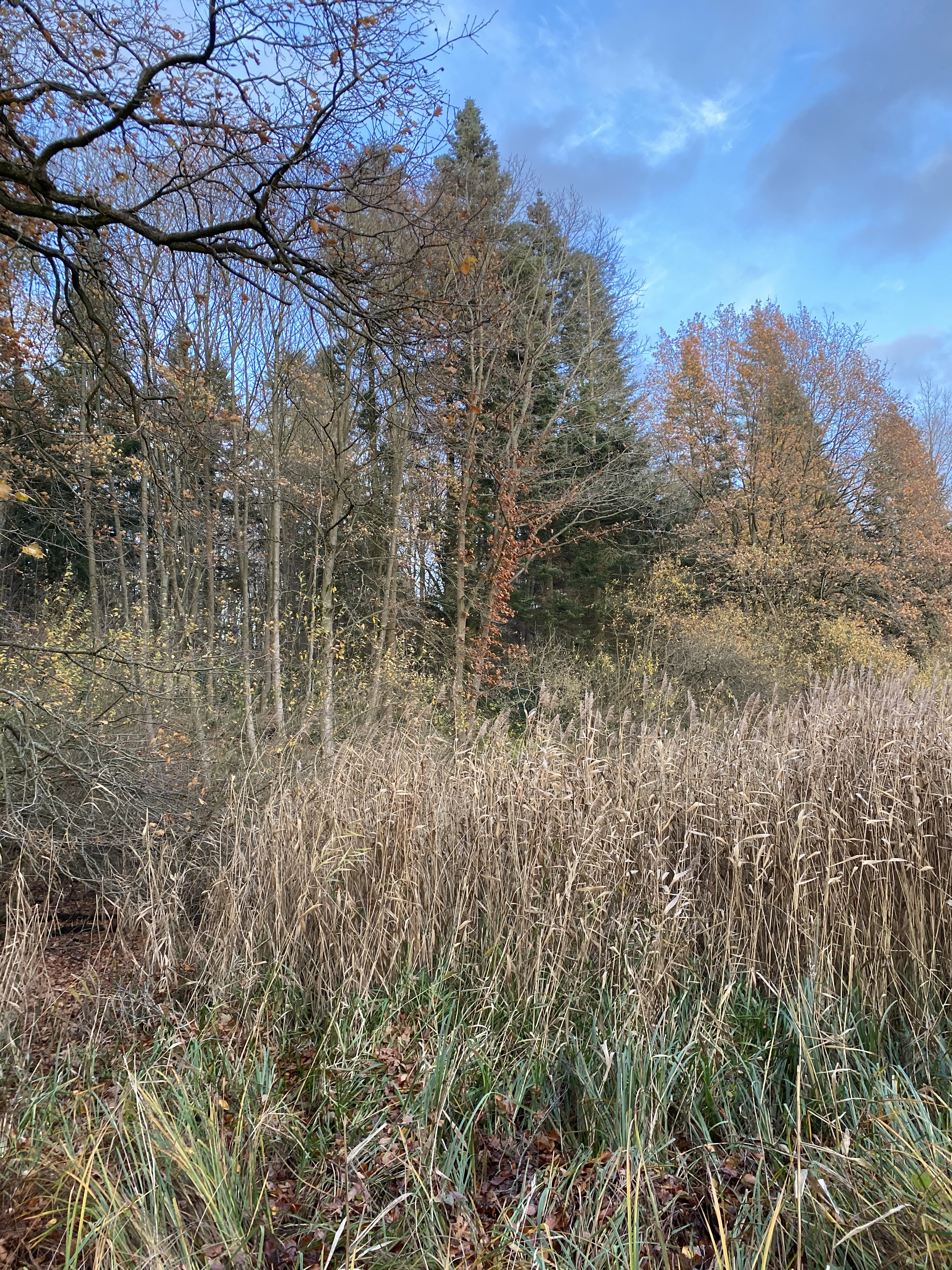

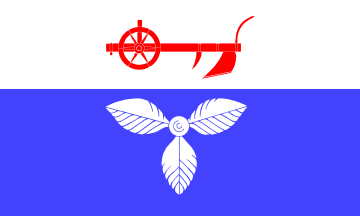
- Flag Coat of arms

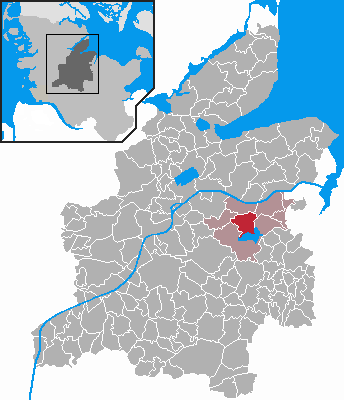
- Location of Felde within Rendsburg-Eckernförde district
- Interactive map of Felde
- Location within Germany Location within Schleswig-Holstein
- Coordinates: 54°18′N 9°56′E
- Country: Germany
- State: Schleswig-Holstein
- District: Rendsburg-Eckernförde
- Municipal assoc.: Achterwehr

Government
  - Mayor: Olaf Greve

Area
  - Total: 13.88 km^{2} (5.36 sq mi)
- Elevation: 14 m (46 ft)

Population (2025-12-31)
  - Total: 2,079
  - Density: 149.8/km^{2} (387.9/sq mi)
- Time zone: UTC+01:00 (CET)
  - Summer (DST): UTC+02:00 (CEST)
- Postal codes: 24242
- Dialling codes: 04340
- Vehicle registration: RD
- Website: www.felde.de

Felde (German pronunciation: [ˈfɛldə]) is a municipality in the district of Rendsburg-Eckernförde, in Schleswig-Holstein, Germany. It is part of the municipal association Achterwehr.

Felde is about 12 km away from Kiel and the federal highway 210 to Rendsburg, since 1989 the federal highway 202.

Felde has an estimated population of 2121 residents, in an area of 13.87 km. As a rural central location, Felde, with its communal and private functions, belongs to the municipalities of the Achterwehr office and beyond. The handicapped infrastructure north offers a wide range both for leisure and recreation as well as for the administration with goods of the needy. Doctors, pharmacy and social station ensure safe medical and nursing care.

The most popular thing about Felde is the natur park in Westensee. In the south of the village lies the Felder lake.

Felde has bathing areas with excellent water quality, which is ideal for a refreshing swim on warm days.

== Geography and traffic ==
The Felde station is located on the railway line from Kiel to Rendsburg. The train to Kiel runs about every half an hour and thus ensures an additional connection between the village and the city. This connection also makes it attractive for young people to move to Felde.

The region around the Westensee is very boggy. The Hasenmoor and the Felder moor as well as some spring swamps of the Eider are located in the municipal area.

== History ==
History and present of the community of Felde Settlement of Feld began quite late. The boggy landscape made it difficult to create habitable land. The story goes back to the year 1547.

== Local council and mayor ==
Of the 16 seats in the municipal council, after the local elections in 2013, the community of interest Die Freie had four seats, the SPD and the community of interests WF each had three seats and the CDU, the Greens and the community of interests BFF each had two seats. Mayoress was Bianca Dommes (The Free).

After the resignation of the mayor Bianca Dommes (Die Freie) in the summer of 2015, the municipal council, which was not assigned to a mayor, and the tasks of the mayors, which were taken over by a representative of the local authority, were given the municipal council at the beginning of 2016 was looked after.

In the new elections in April 2016, the SPD got five seats, the WF interest group three and the CDU, the Greens and the BFF interest group two of the 14 seats each.
