= Lohe-Föhrden =

Lohe-Föhrden Lo-Førden
- Municipality
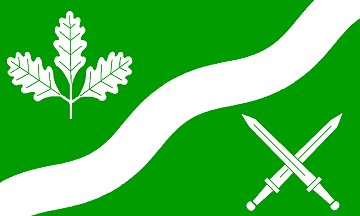
- Flag Coat of arms

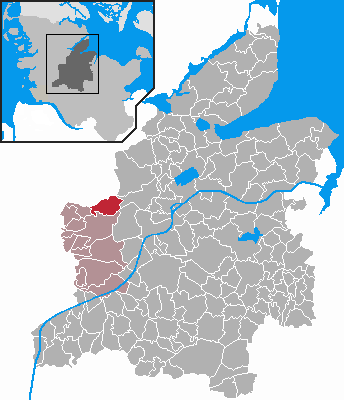
- Location of Lohe-Föhrden; Lo-Førden within Rendsburg-Eckernförde district
- Interactive map of Lohe-Föhrden; Lo-Førden
- Location within Germany Location within Schleswig-Holstein
- Coordinates: 54°19′N 9°31′E
- Country: Germany
- State: Schleswig-Holstein
- District: Rendsburg-Eckernförde
- Municipal assoc.: Hohner Harde

Government
  - Mayor: Gisela Kaschner

Area
  - Total: 16.03 km^{2} (6.19 sq mi)
- Elevation: 8 m (26 ft)

Population (2025-12-31)
  - Total: 425
  - Density: 26.5/km^{2} (68.7/sq mi)
- Time zone: UTC+01:00 (CET)
  - Summer (DST): UTC+02:00 (CEST)
- Postal codes: 24806
- Dialling codes: 04335
- Vehicle registration: RD
- Website: www.amt-hohner- harde.de

Lohe-Föhrden (Danish: Lo-Førden) is a municipality in the district of Rendsburg-Eckernförde, in Schleswig-Holstein, Germany.
