= Jevenstedt =

- Municipality
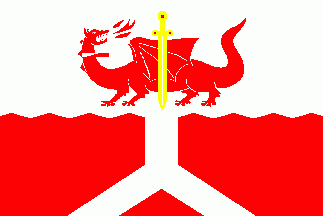
- Flag Coat of arms

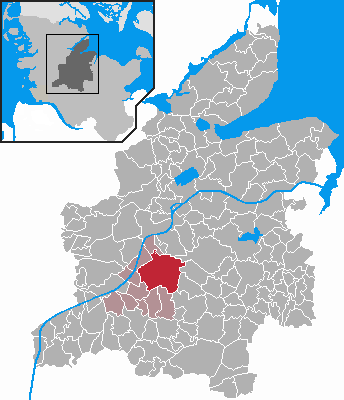
- Location of Jevenstedt within Rendsburg-Eckernförde district
- Interactive map of Jevenstedt
- Location within Germany Location within Schleswig-Holstein
- Coordinates: 54°13′54″N 9°40′18″E
- Country: Germany
- State: Schleswig-Holstein
- District: Rendsburg-Eckernförde
- Municipal assoc.: Jevenstedt

Government
  - Mayor: Dieter Backhaus (SPD)

Area
  - Total: 45.48 km^{2} (17.56 sq mi)
- Elevation: 6 m (20 ft)

Population (2025-12-31)
  - Total: 3,285
  - Density: 72.23/km^{2} (187.1/sq mi)
- Time zone: UTC+01:00 (CET)
  - Summer (DST): UTC+02:00 (CEST)
- Postal codes: 24808
- Dialling codes: 04337
- Vehicle registration: RD
- Website: www.amt-jevenstedt.de

Jevenstedt is a municipality in the district of Rendsburg-Eckernförde, in Schleswig-Holstein, Germany. It is situated approximately 8 km south of Rendsburg.

Jevenstedt is the seat of the Amt ("collective municipality") Jevenstedt.
