= Schacht-Audorf =

- Municipality
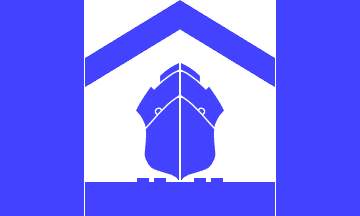
- Flag Coat of arms

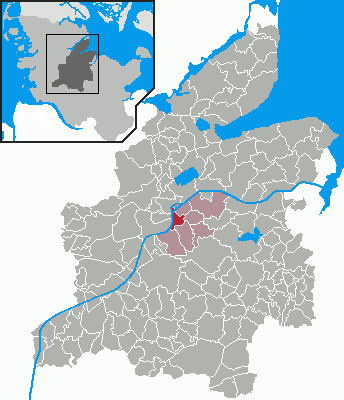
- Location of Schacht-Audorf within Rendsburg-Eckernförde district
- Interactive map of Schacht-Audorf
- Location within Germany Location within Schleswig-Holstein
- Coordinates: 54°18′35″N 9°43′14″E
- Country: Germany
- State: Schleswig-Holstein
- District: Rendsburg-Eckernförde
- Municipal assoc.: Eiderkanal

Government
  - Mayor: Joachim Sievers

Area
  - Total: 6.52 km^{2} (2.52 sq mi)
- Elevation: 12 m (39 ft)

Population (2025-12-31)
  - Total: 4,804
  - Density: 737/km^{2} (1,910/sq mi)
- Time zone: UTC+01:00 (CET)
  - Summer (DST): UTC+02:00 (CEST)
- Postal codes: 24790
- Dialling codes: 04331
- Vehicle registration: RD
- Website: www.amt-eiderkanal.de

Schacht-Audorf is a municipality in the district of Rendsburg-Eckernförde, in Schleswig-Holstein, Germany. It is situated on the Kiel Canal, approx. 3 km east of Rendsburg, and 27 km west of Kiel.
