= Fockbek =

- Municipality
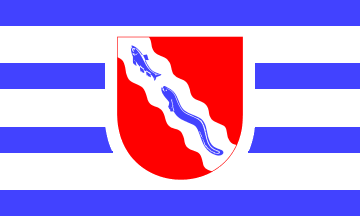
- Flag Coat of arms

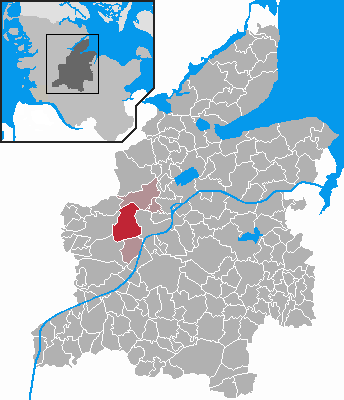
- Location of Fockbek within Rendsburg-Eckernförde district
- Interactive map of Fockbek
- Location within Germany Location within Schleswig-Holstein
- Coordinates: 54°18′18″N 9°36′3″E
- Country: Germany
- State: Schleswig-Holstein
- District: Rendsburg-Eckernförde
- Municipal assoc.: Fockbek

Government
  - Mayor: Pierre Gilgenast (SPD)

Area
  - Total: 26.65 km^{2} (10.29 sq mi)
- Elevation: 12 m (39 ft)

Population (2025-12-31)
  - Total: 6,634
  - Density: 248.9/km^{2} (644.7/sq mi)
- Time zone: UTC+01:00 (CET)
  - Summer (DST): UTC+02:00 (CEST)
- Postal codes: 24787
- Dialling codes: 04331, 04335
- Vehicle registration: RD
- Website: www.fockbek.de

Fockbek (German pronunciation: [ˈfɔkbeːk]; Danish: Fokbæk) is a municipality in the district of Rendsburg-Eckernförde, in Schleswig-Holstein, Germany. It is situated approximately 5 km west of Rendsburg. Fockbek is well known throughout Schleswig-Holstein for the story of the Aalversupers (eel drowners) and is the home of the world's largest caravan manufacturer "Hobby Wohnwagen".

Fockbek is the seat of the Amt ("collective municipality") Fockbek.

== People ==
- Ernst Voss (1822-1920), German shipbuilder and company founder of Blohm+Voss
