= Janeczek =

Janeczek is a Polish surname. Notable people with this surname include:

- Bernhard Janeczek (born 1992), Austrian football player
- Helena Janeczek (born 1964), Italian novelist
- Jerzy Janeczek (1944–2021), Polish theater and film actor
- Paweł Janeczek (1973–2010), Polish politician
