= Ostertag =

Ostertag is a German surname that may refer to the following people:

- Berthold Ostertag (1895–1975), German pathologist and physician
- Blanche Ostertag (1872–1915), American decorative artist
- Bob Ostertag (born 1957), American experimental sound artist, political activist and writer
- Greg Ostertag (born 1973), American basketball player
- Harold C. Ostertag (1896–1985), American politician
- Heiger Ostertag (born 1953), German novelist
- Lee Knox Ostertag (born 1991), American cartoonist and writer
- Robert von Ostertag (1864–1940), German veterinarian
- Sébastien Ostertag (born 1979), French team handball player
