= Itzehoe =

- Town
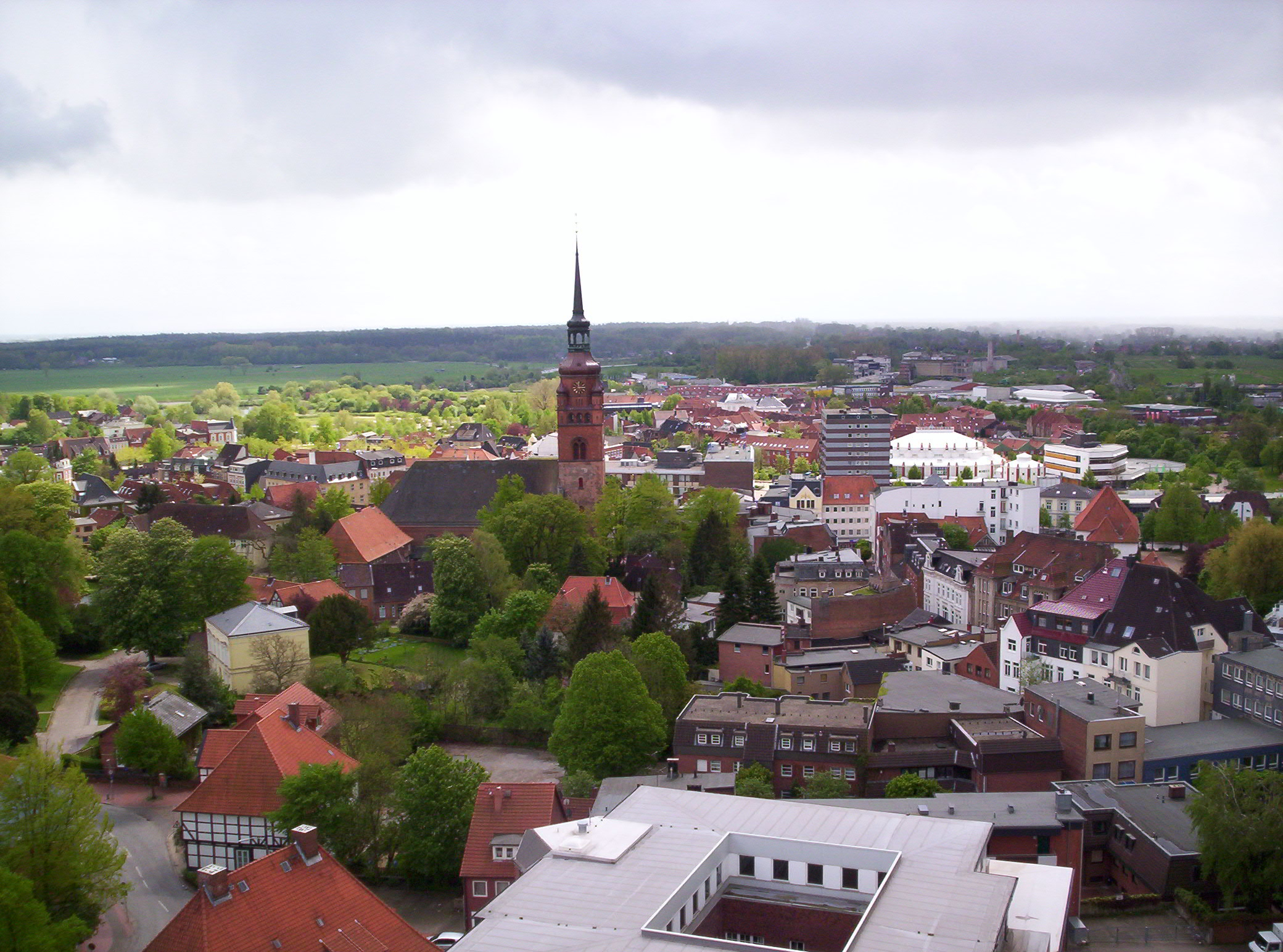
- Center of the town

- Coat of arms

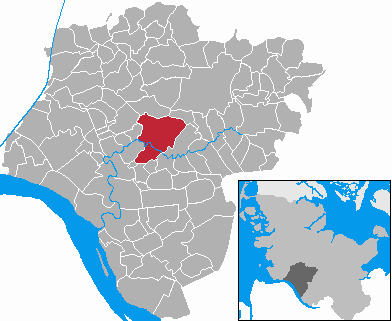
- Location of Itzehoe within Steinburg district
- Interactive map of Itzehoe
- Location within Germany Location within Schleswig-Holstein
- Coordinates: 53°55′30″N 9°30′59″E
- Country: Germany
- State: Schleswig-Holstein
- District: Steinburg

Government
  - Mayor: Ralf Hoppe (Ind.)

Area
  - Total: 28.03 km^{2} (10.82 sq mi)
- Elevation: 22 m (72 ft)

Population (2025-12-31)
  - Total: 32,850
  - Density: 1,172/km^{2} (3,035/sq mi)
- Time zone: UTC+01:00 (CET)
  - Summer (DST): UTC+02:00 (CEST)
- Postal codes: 25501−25524
- Dialling codes: 04821
- Vehicle registration: IZ
- Website: www.itzehoe.de

Itzehoe (German: [ɪtsəˈhoː]; Low German: Itzhoe) is a town in Schleswig-Holstein in northern Germany.

As the capital of the district Steinburg, Itzehoe is located on the Stör, a navigable tributary of the Elbe, 51 km (31.7 mi) northwest of Hamburg and 24 km (14.9 mi) north of Glückstadt. The population is about 32,530.

== Toponymy ==
Itzehoe Castle was first mentioned in 1168 as "Echeho". The town of Itzehoe (‘Opidium Ekeho’) was first mentioned by Saxo Grammaticus in 1196. Later it was mentioned again as ‘de Ezeho’. The meaning of the name is still disputed today. The component -hoe seems most likely to describe an elevation or raised river bend and to be related to the -Hoo, -ho or -hoe names found in England ('Sutton Hoo', 'Ivinghoe'). The first part, 'Etze-', 'Eche-' or 'Itze-', is associated either with a pasture or the Old Saxon word for 'oak'.

== History ==
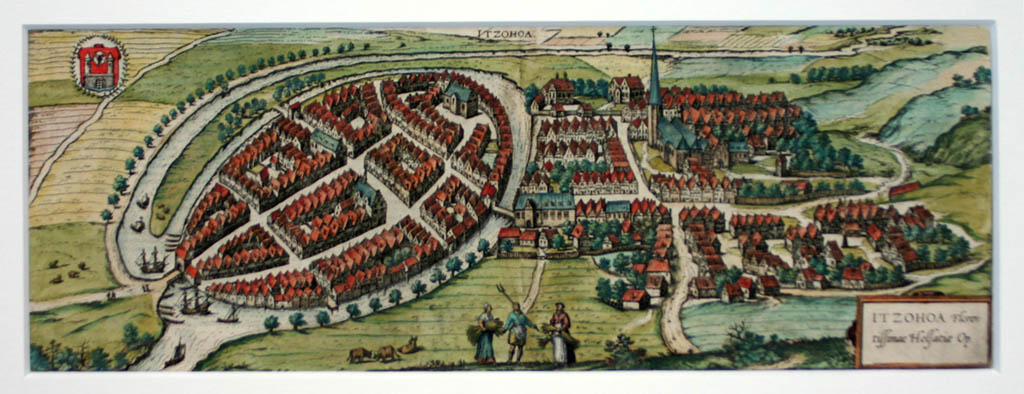
16th-century view of Itzehoe

Itzehoe is one of the oldest towns in Holstein. As early as 810 AD, Charlemagne built the Esesfeld castle in the Oldenburgskuhle, 2 kilometres from the later town, as protection against the Danes marauding from the north, but this has no direct connection with the development of Itzehoe. Under its protection, Archbishop Ebbo of Reims built a small monastery or prayer house, the ‘cella Welanao’, in the summer of 823 in what is now Münsterdorf as a base for the Christian mission he initiated in Denmark. The larger Echeho Castle, built around 1000 in the nearby meander of the River Stör, became the nucleus of a settlement that developed into a trading town, favoured by the granting of the Lübeck rights (1238), combined with freedom from customs duties, which at that time was only granted to Hamburg in the country, and later the right to stack goods (1260). During this time, Itzehoe was involved in the salt, cloth and grain trade and was at times an important hub in European east–west trade. Further settlements developed on the other side of the river around the monastery courtyard (around 1260) and around the Church of St. Laurentii (first mentioned in 1196).

As part of the Duchy of Holstein, Itzehoe remained under the rule of the Danish crown from 1460 until 1864.

In the 16th century, the proximity to Burg Breitenburg, the ancestral seat of the Rantzau family, who were the governors of the Duchies of Schleswig and Holstein on behalf of the Danish king, was particularly beneficial. Heinrich Rantzau, in particular, expanded the economic infrastructure of the surrounding area and promoted the Itzehoe monastery. He also built a city palace on Breiten Straße, which no longer exists today, and expanded the Rantzau family's burial grounds in the church. He also initiated the installation of the first organ in St. Laurentii Church and the promotion of church music. The first depiction and written description of the city in Braun and Hogenberg's map collection was commissioned directly by Heinrich Rantzau.

During the Thirty Years' War, the town was repeatedly occupied and plundered, but there was no major destruction because the town council surrendered the town to General Wallenstein without a fight in 1627. This allowed Itzehoe to maintain its status as the fifth of the eighteen towns of Schleswig-Holstein.

After having been largely spared from war for a long time, Itzehoe was almost completely destroyed by Swedish soldiers in 1657 during the Danish-Swedish War (1657–1658). As a result, the cloister of St. Laurentii Church is now the only surviving medieval building in Itzehoe.

In 1712, the Asian bubonic plague, which had been brought in from East Prussia and Poland, broke out in Itzehoe. The disease claimed the lives of 250 inhabitants (around 7% of the population of 3,500 at that time).

Itzehoe was only indirectly affected by the Napoleonic Wars through transit and quartering as well as financial burdens. From 1807, Itzehoe briefly became the residence of Elector Wilhelm I of Hesse-Kassel, who had fled into exile from Napoleon.

From the first two decades of the 19th century onwards, a lively cultural life developed in Itzehoe. This was further promoted by the presence of German-Danish nobility in the administration and military. From the 1810s onwards, the first ‘reading societies’ and choirs were founded. At the same time, several printing houses were established and, in 1817, the Itzehoer Wochenblatt, the town's first newspaper, was launched, which soon became important beyond the region. Before the Schleswig-Holstein uprising, in which a large part of the citizens of Itzehoe took sides with the pro-German Schleswig-Holstein movement, the Holstein Assembly of Estates met in Itzehoe from 1835 to 1848 and again from 1852 to 1863, thus establishing the history of parliamentarianism in Schleswig-Holstein.

After the German-Danish War of 1864, the Duchy of Holstein was initially administered jointly by Prussia and Austria, ending over 400 years of Danish rule. The new governor Ludwig Karl Wilhelm von Gablenz finally convened the Holstein Assembly of Estates for the last time on 11 June 1866. However, a conference was prevented by the events surrounding the Austro-Prussian War of 1866. After the end of this war, the Duchy of Holstein, including Itzehoe, fell to Prussia: in 1867, together with the Duchy of Schleswig, the province of Schleswig-Holstein was created.

The railway connection (1847) and the link to the new road from Hamburg to Rendsburg (1846) ushered in the industrial age in Itzehoe, with many commercial and industrial enterprises (including sugar production, weaving, chemical industry and shipbuilding) settled in and around Itzehoe, helping the town regain its economic importance.

Itzehoe was listed as a garrison depot (Wehrkreis X (Hamburg)) of the former 225th Infantry Division, which was implicated in the 1940 Vinkt Massacre in Belgium.

Following the joint German-Soviet invasion of Poland, which started World War II in September 1939, it was the location of the Oflag X-A prisoner-of-war camp for Polish officers, which was eventually relocated to Sandbostel in 1941. During the war, Itzehoe was not initially a primary target for the Allied strategic bombing campaign, but was hit by an Allied bombing raid very late in the war, when Allied carpet bombing on 2 May 1945 (just two days before the German surrender at Lüneburg Heath) caused 22 fatalities in the city.

Until it was filled in with around 110,000 m3 of sand in 1974, a bend in the River Stör had a decisive influence on the appearance of Itzehoe town centre. The bend was the original course of the river. The Stör crossing ( low German ‘Delf’, from which the names “Delftor” and “Delftorbrücke” of the town exit and the Störbrücke bridge originate) turned Itzehoe's castle complex into an island. There are said to have been sluices in the delta that closed when the water ran out, forcing the water to flow through and clean the bend. After their removal, the river increasingly silted up and developed into an almost stagnant, foul-smelling body of water. The old town centre, the ‘Neustadt’ (new town), could only be reached via bridges. In the course of the redevelopment of the ‘Neustadt’, during which almost all the houses on this former island were demolished and replaced by new buildings and new streets were laid out, this element that characterised the town became extinct. Only a few artificially created water basins between the new theatre and Salzstraße are reminders of the original course of the loop.

In order to improve the cityscape again, an initiative was launched in 2011 with the aim of promoting the reopening of the filled-in Störschleife in the centre of Itzehoe. In 2017, the entire city centre was declared a redevelopment area. The restoration of the Störschleife was explicitly named as a goal. On 26 September 2021, the residents of Itzehoe voted by 7707 votes in favour of restoring the Stör bend. Concrete plans for implementation have been underway since August 2022. In February 2023, the winning design was to be presented by one of nine planning teams.

In the 1990s, the Fraunhofer Institute for Silicon Technology ISIT was established on the northern edge of Itzehoe. Many chip research and high-tech companies have since settled around this institute on the InnoQuarter Itzehoe industrial estate. As a result, Itzehoe is increasingly developing into a centre of high technology in northern Germany.

== Climate ==
Itzehoe has an oceanic climate (Cfb in the Köppen climate classification).

Climate data for Itzehoe (1991–2020 normals, extremes 1988–present)
| Month | Jan | Feb | Mar | Apr | May | Jun | Jul | Aug | Sep | Oct | Nov | Dec | Year |
|---|---|---|---|---|---|---|---|---|---|---|---|---|---|
| Record high °C (°F) | 14.7 (58.5) | 18.1 (64.6) | 22.5 (72.5) | 26.9 (80.4) | 32.2 (90.0) | 33.6 (92.5) | 36.9 (98.4) | 34.9 (94.8) | 30.9 (87.6) | 26.4 (79.5) | 20.2 (68.4) | 14.6 (58.3) | 36.9 (98.4) |
| Mean daily maximum °C (°F) | 4.1 (39.4) | 4.9 (40.8) | 8.3 (46.9) | 14.1 (57.4) | 17.7 (63.9) | 20.8 (69.4) | 23.0 (73.4) | 22.6 (72.7) | 19.1 (66.4) | 13.8 (56.8) | 8.6 (47.5) | 5.6 (42.1) | 13.5 (56.3) |
| Daily mean °C (°F) | 2.0 (35.6) | 2.3 (36.1) | 4.3 (39.7) | 8.7 (47.7) | 12.5 (54.5) | 15.5 (59.9) | 17.7 (63.9) | 17.5 (63.5) | 14.2 (57.6) | 10.3 (50.5) | 6.1 (43.0) | 3.4 (38.1) | 9.5 (49.1) |
| Mean daily minimum °C (°F) | −0.7 (30.7) | −0.8 (30.6) | 0.2 (32.4) | 3.2 (37.8) | 6.6 (43.9) | 10.0 (50.0) | 12.2 (54.0) | 12.1 (53.8) | 9.4 (48.9) | 6.2 (43.2) | 3.1 (37.6) | 0.9 (33.6) | 5.2 (41.4) |
| Record low °C (°F) | −14.0 (6.8) | −18.2 (−0.8) | −21.3 (−6.3) | −5.9 (21.4) | −3.1 (26.4) | 0.5 (32.9) | 5.4 (41.7) | 3.1 (37.6) | 0.3 (32.5) | −7.9 (17.8) | −9.7 (14.5) | −15.7 (3.7) | −21.3 (−6.3) |
| Average precipitation mm (inches) | 85.9 (3.38) | 63.3 (2.49) | 53.7 (2.11) | 33.4 (1.31) | 61.3 (2.41) | 76.5 (3.01) | 99.9 (3.93) | 94.0 (3.70) | 70.3 (2.77) | 74.8 (2.94) | 75.4 (2.97) | 87.5 (3.44) | 883.9 (34.80) |
| Average precipitation days (≥ 1.0 mm) | 19.5 | 16.4 | 15.3 | 13.1 | 14.2 | 15.3 | 16.5 | 17.8 | 15.3 | 17.1 | 18.8 | 20.7 | 201.0 |
| Average relative humidity (%) | 89.2 | 86.2 | 81.3 | 74.7 | 73.6 | 75.3 | 76.2 | 78.6 | 82.7 | 86.3 | 90.0 | 91.0 | 82.1 |
| Mean monthly sunshine hours | 40.3 | 66.6 | 123.1 | 193.9 | 227.1 | 218.4 | 225.1 | 191.4 | 154.8 | 110.7 | 52.3 | 33.3 | 1,630.7 |
Source 1: World Meteorological Organization
Source 2: DWD (extremes)

== Sights ==
The Church of St. Laurentii and the building in which the Holstein estates formerly met are noteworthy. The town has a convent founded in 1256, many schools, a hospital and other benevolent institutions.

Public Buildings

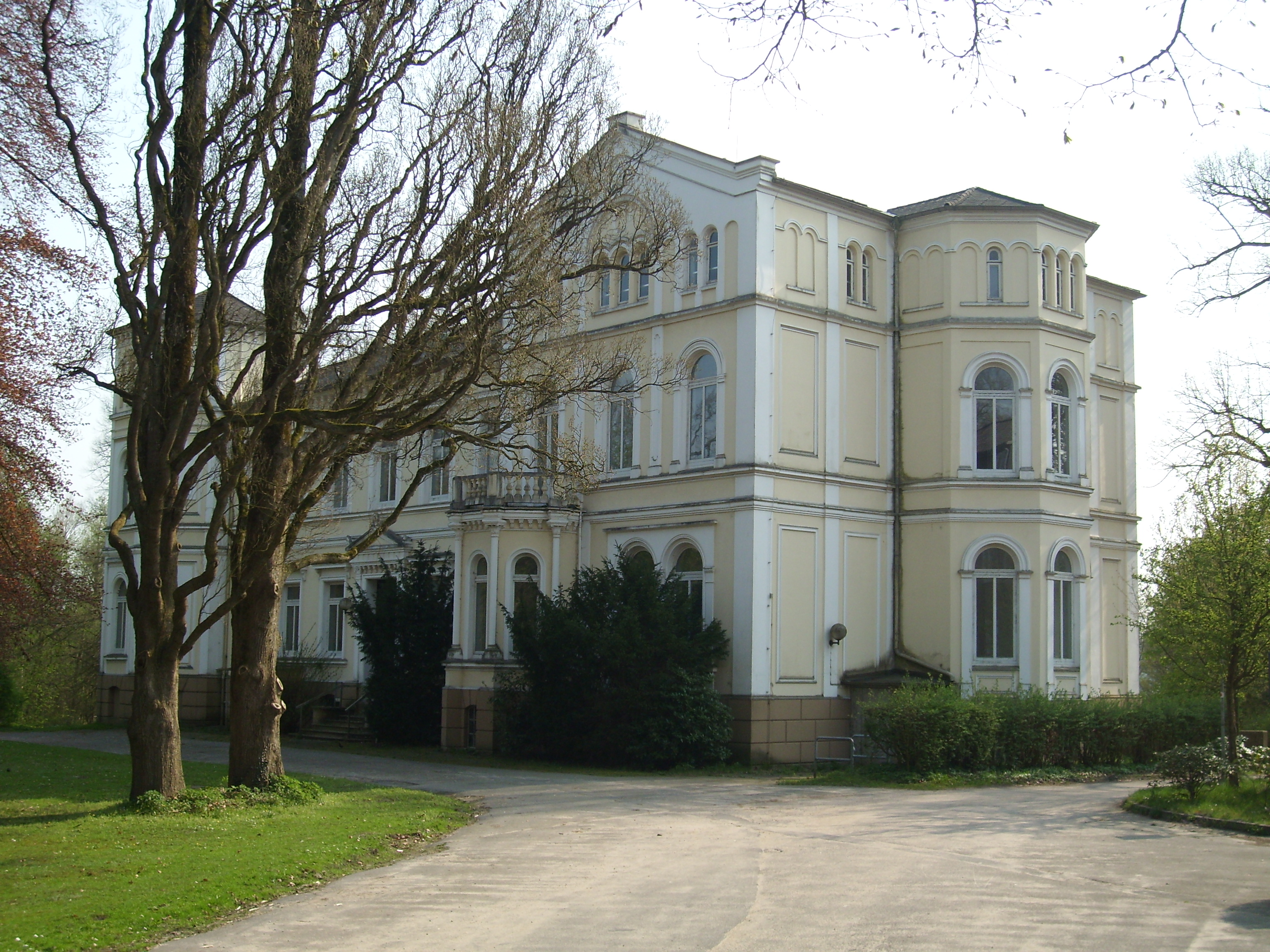
Former Court Building Itzehoe

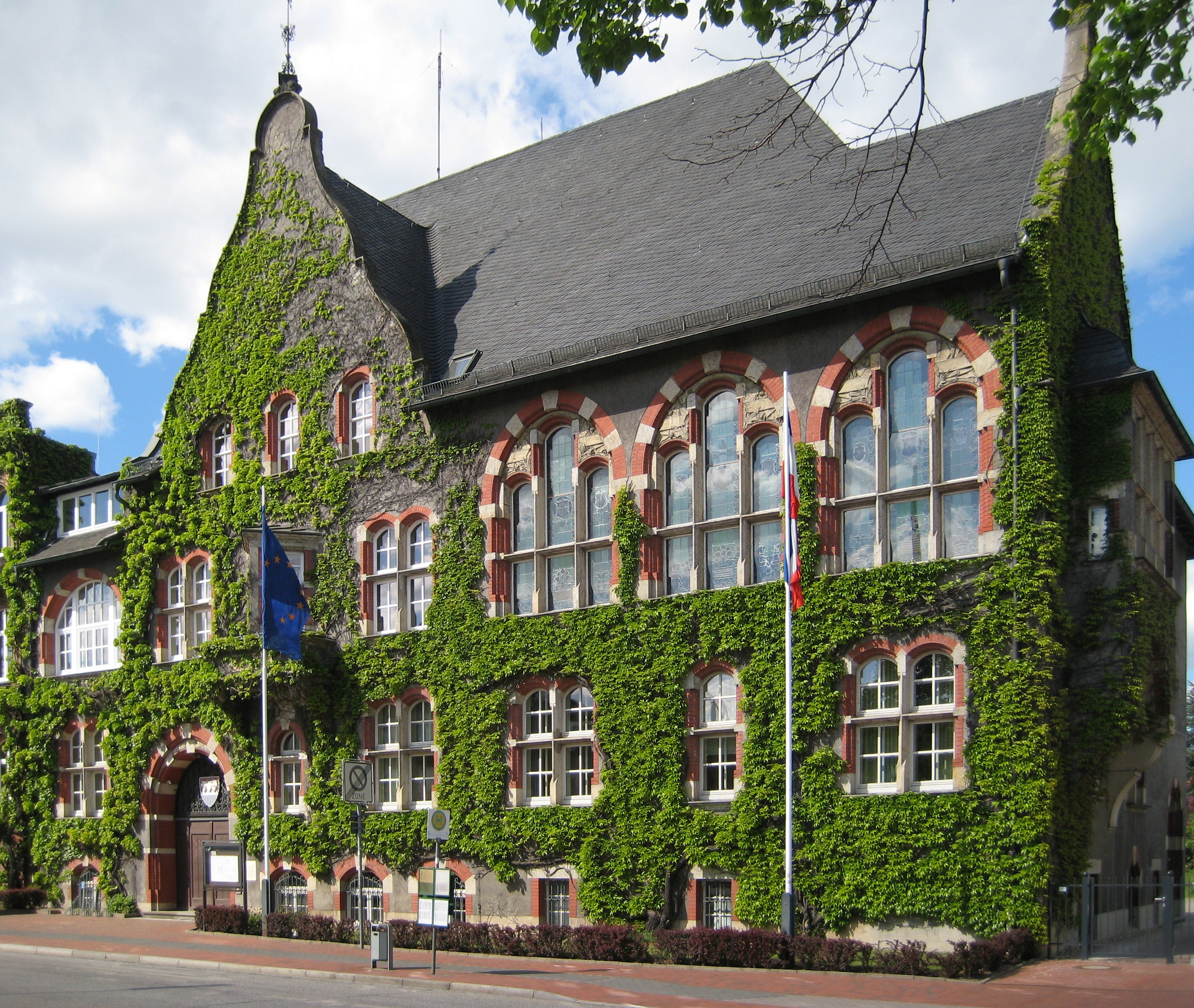
County House Steinburg

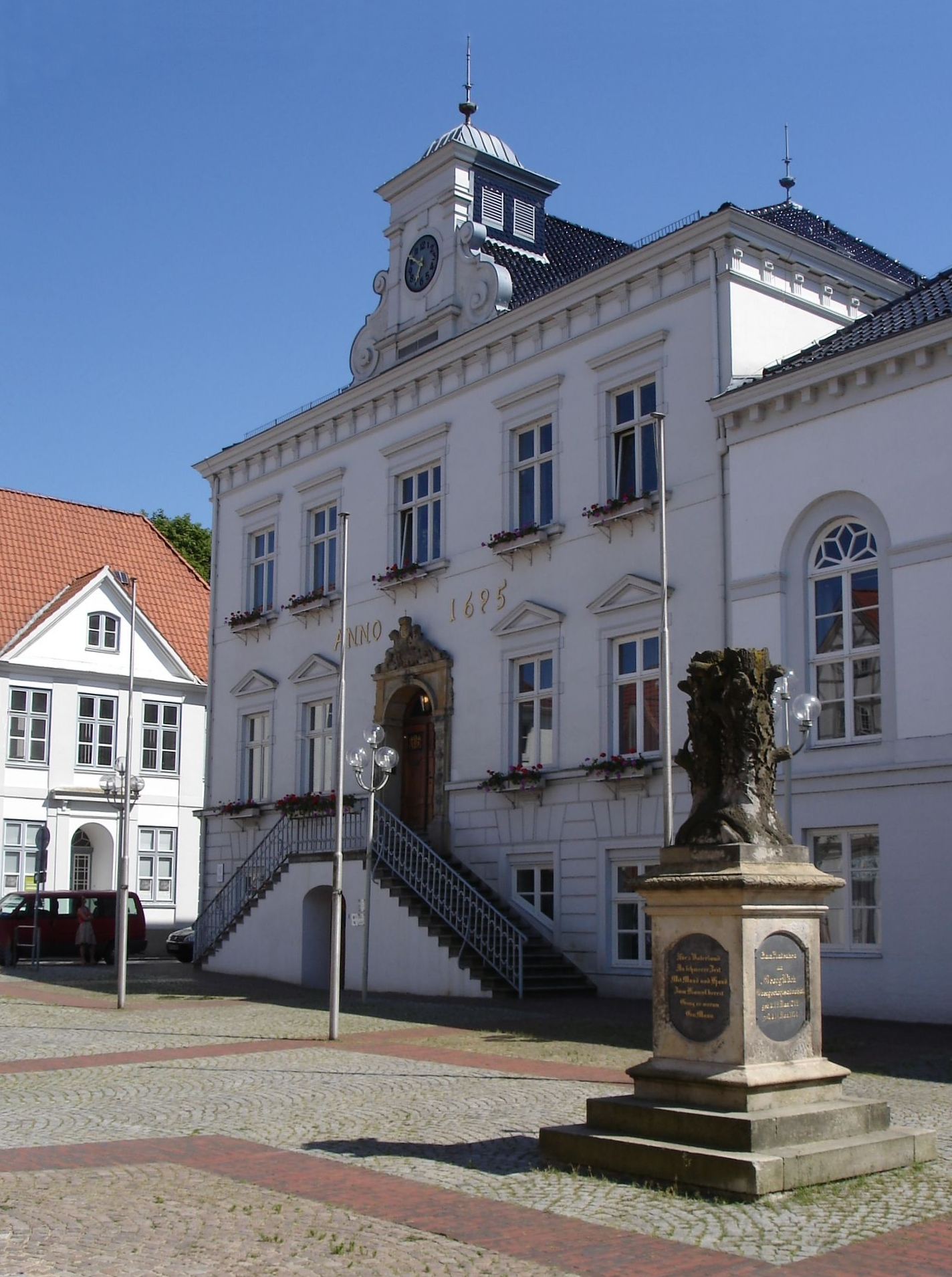
Historic Town Hall

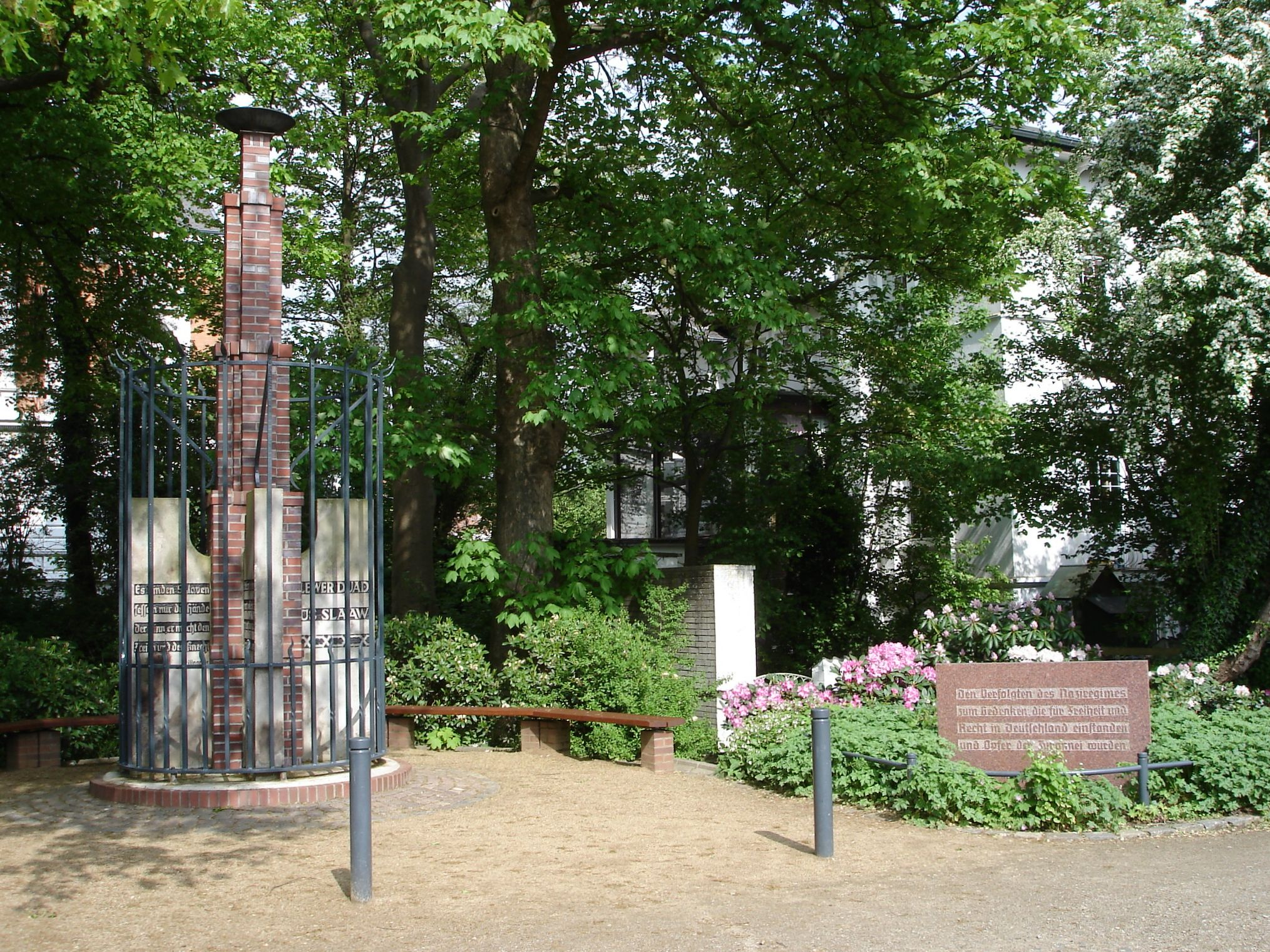
Memorial to the Victims of National Socialism

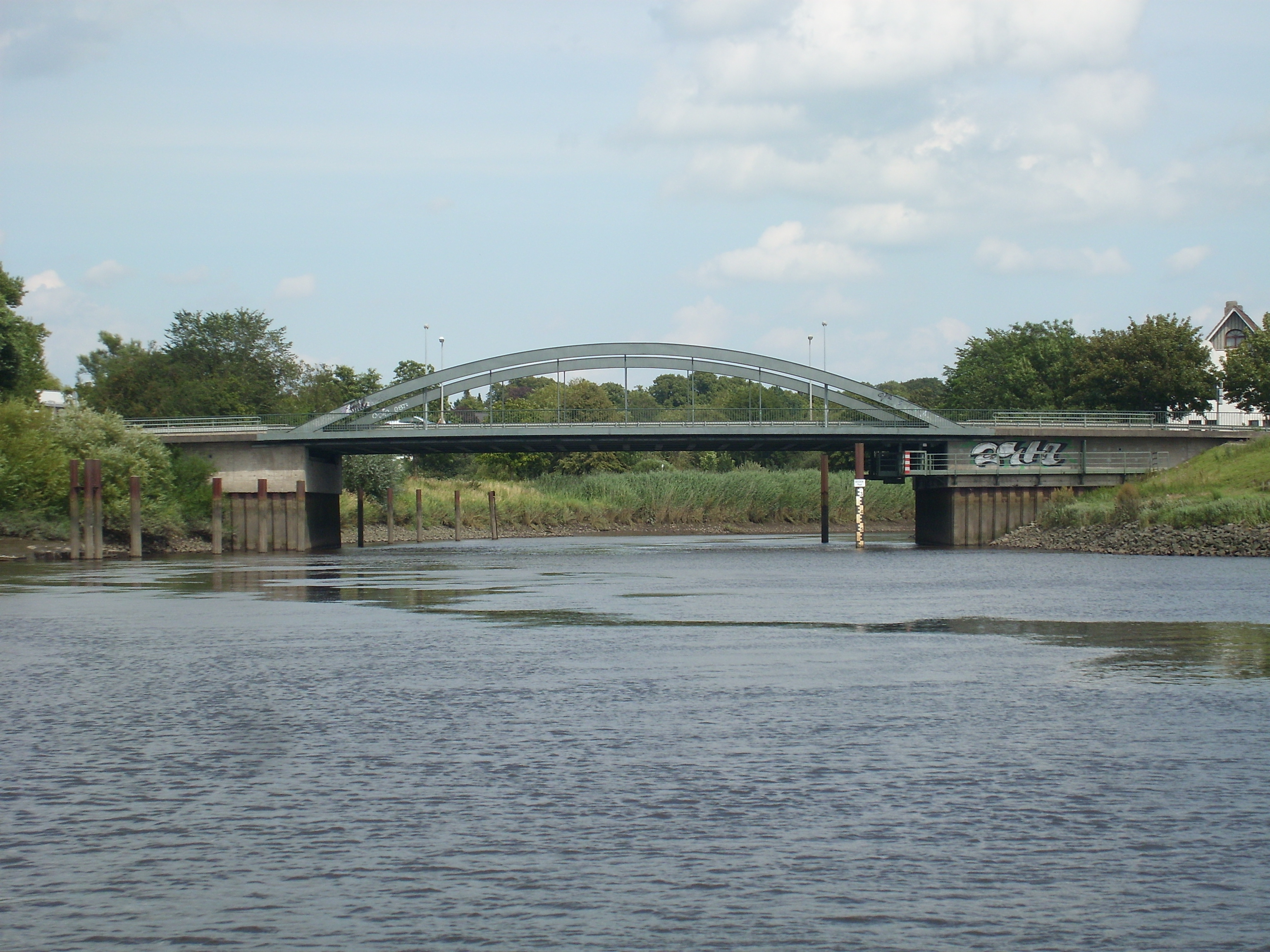
Delftor Bridge crossing the river Stör

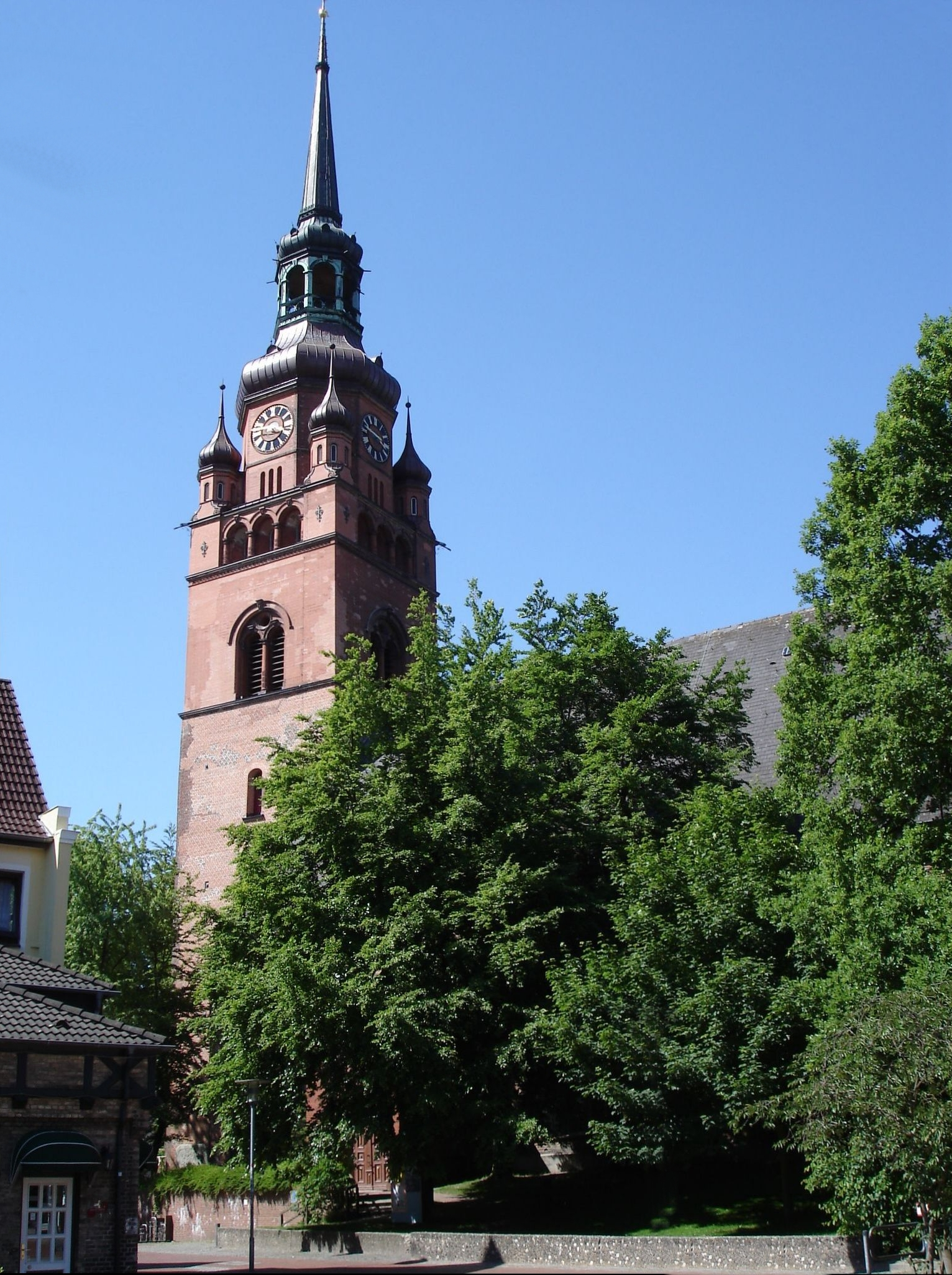
St. Laurentii Church

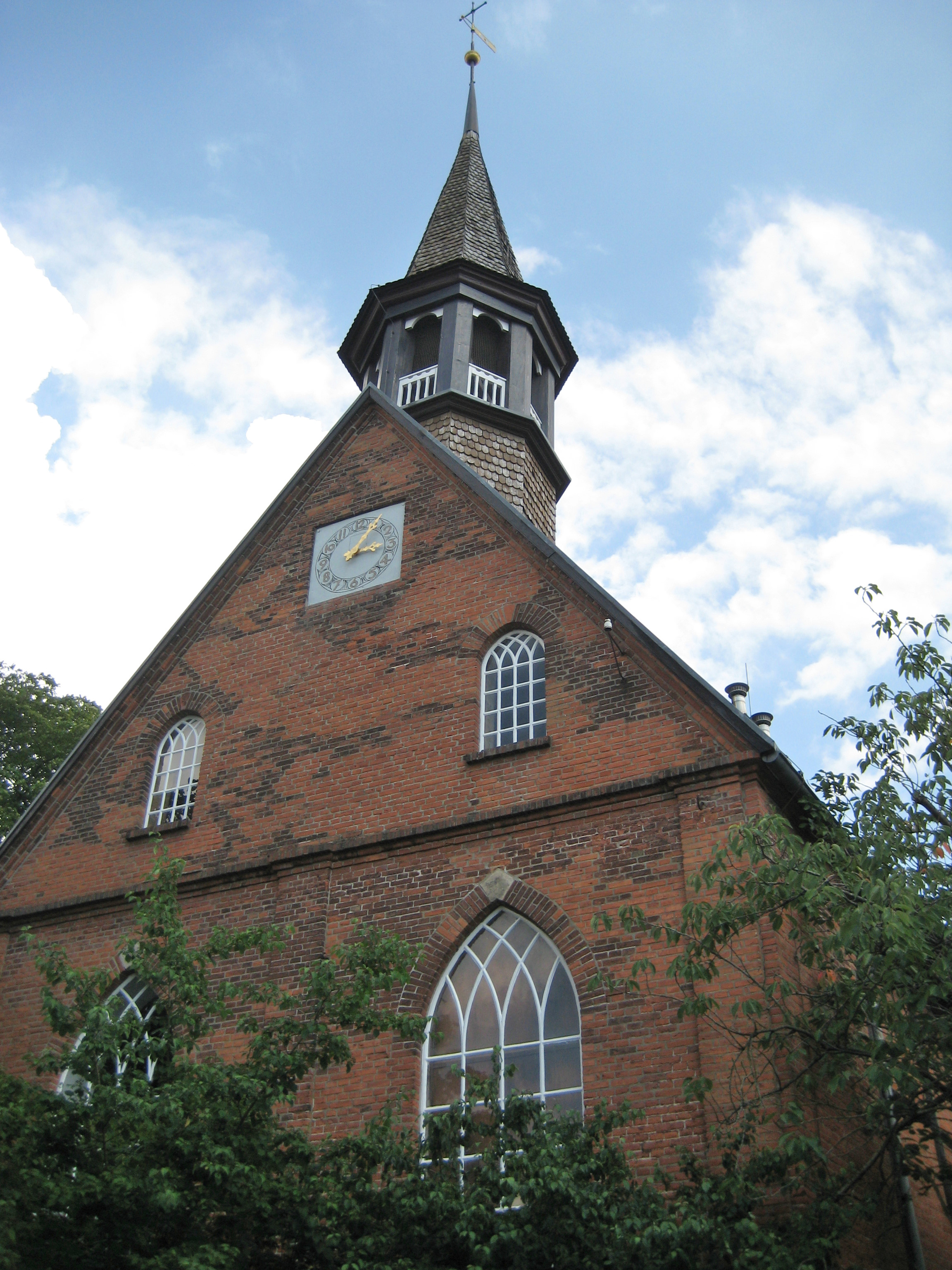
Chappel of St.-Jürgen

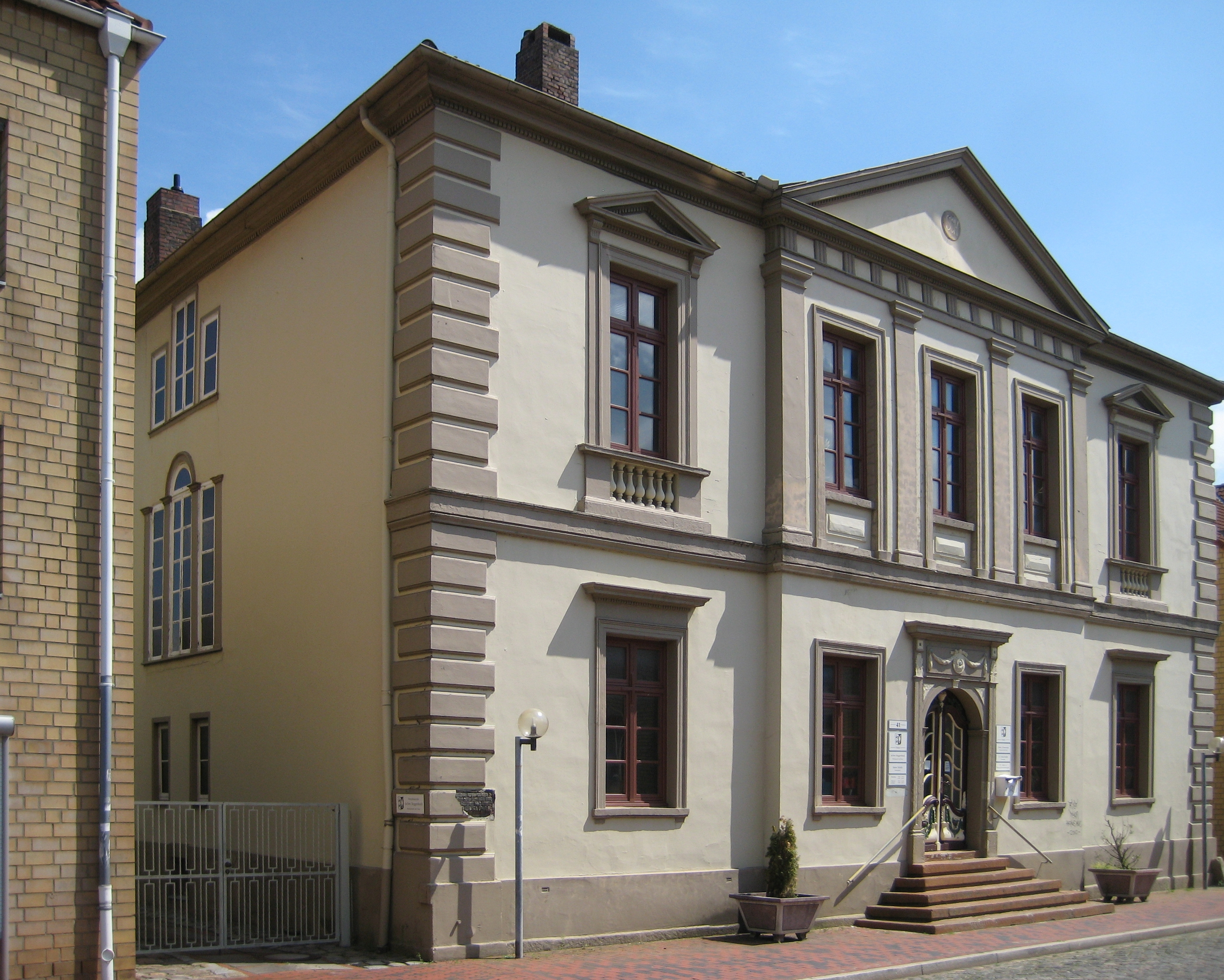
'Altes Pastorat'

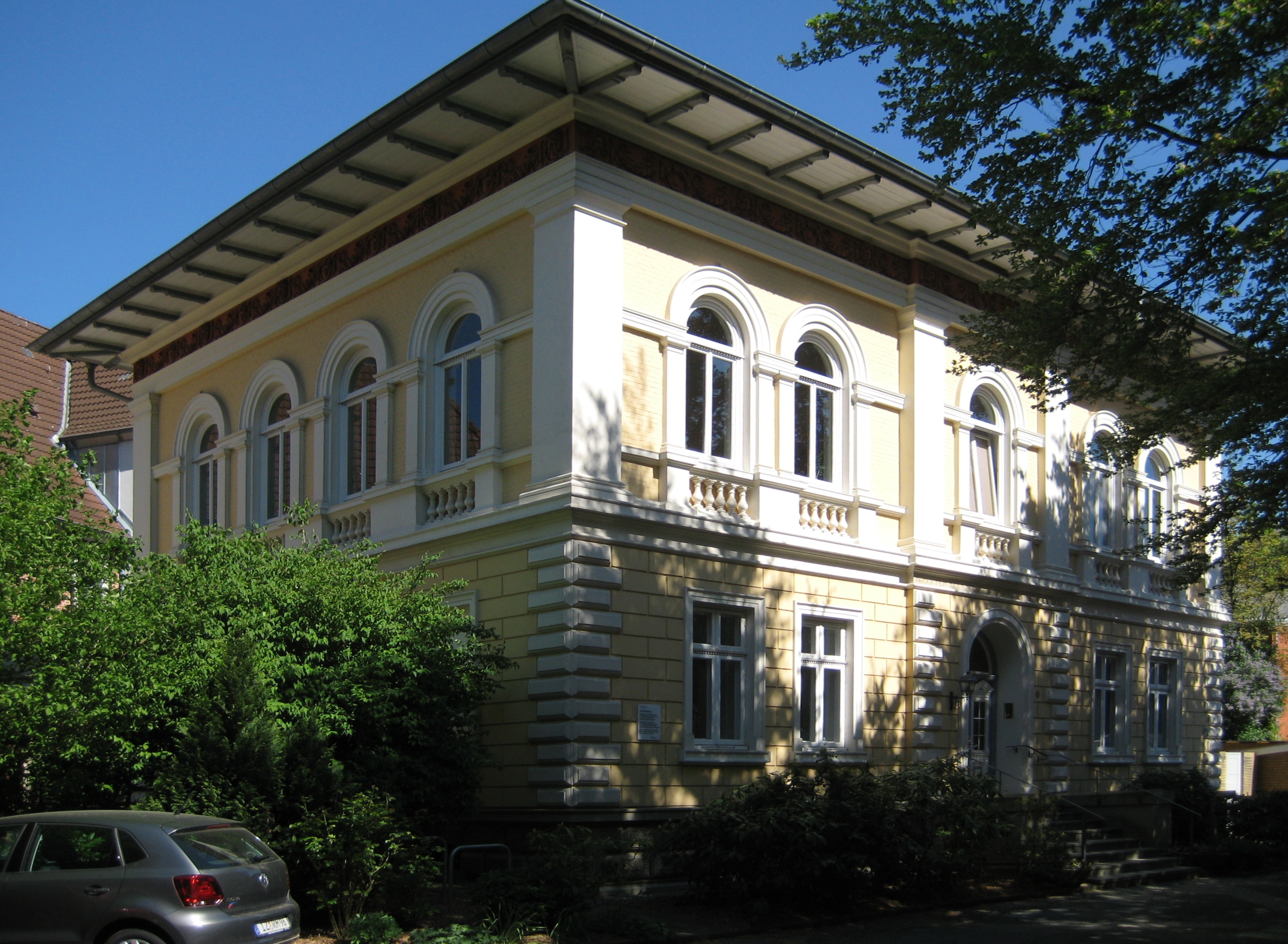
'Probstenhaus' (Provost's office)

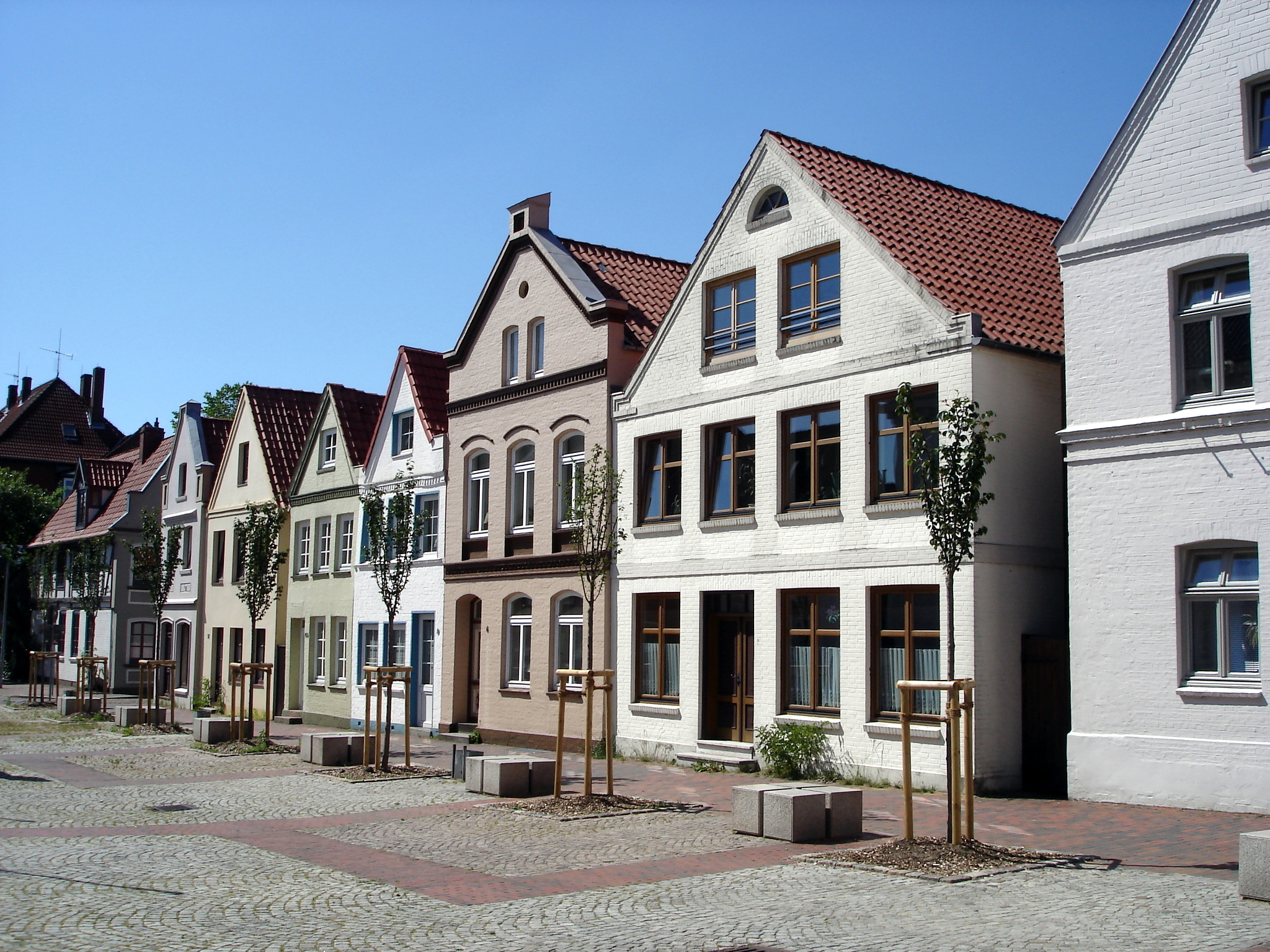
Houses at the market sqare

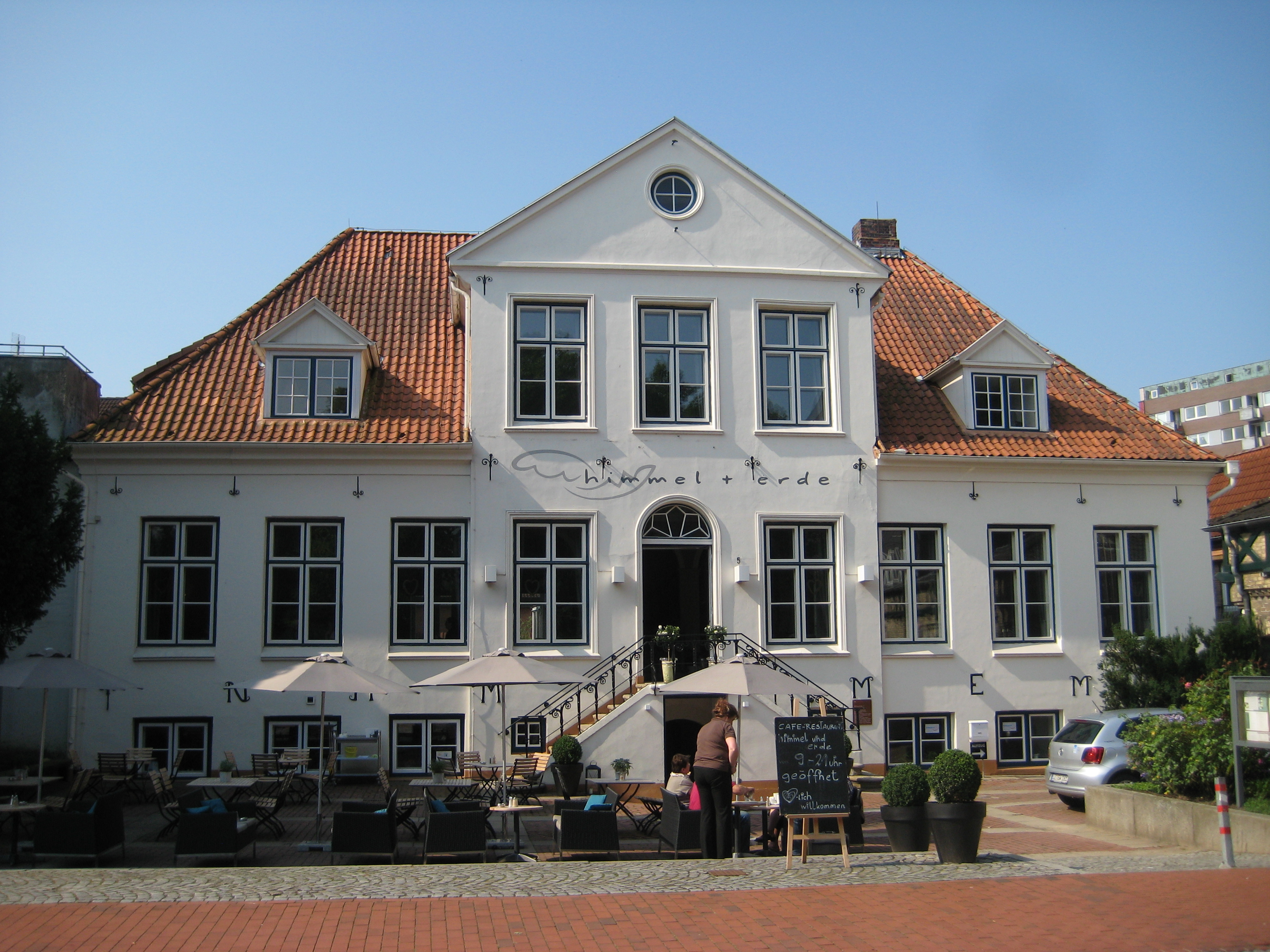
Altes Katasteramt (former Land Registry Office)

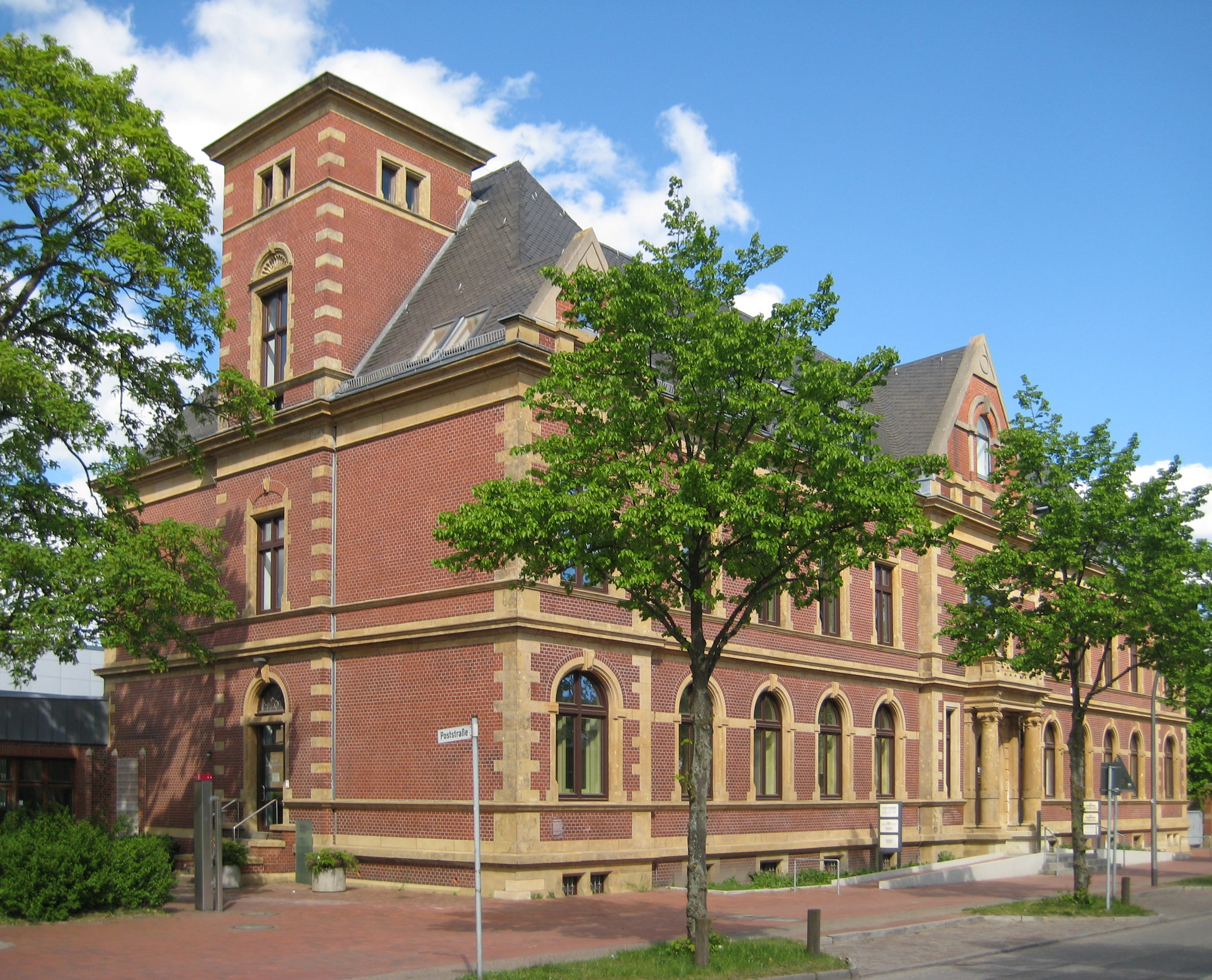
Former Post Office

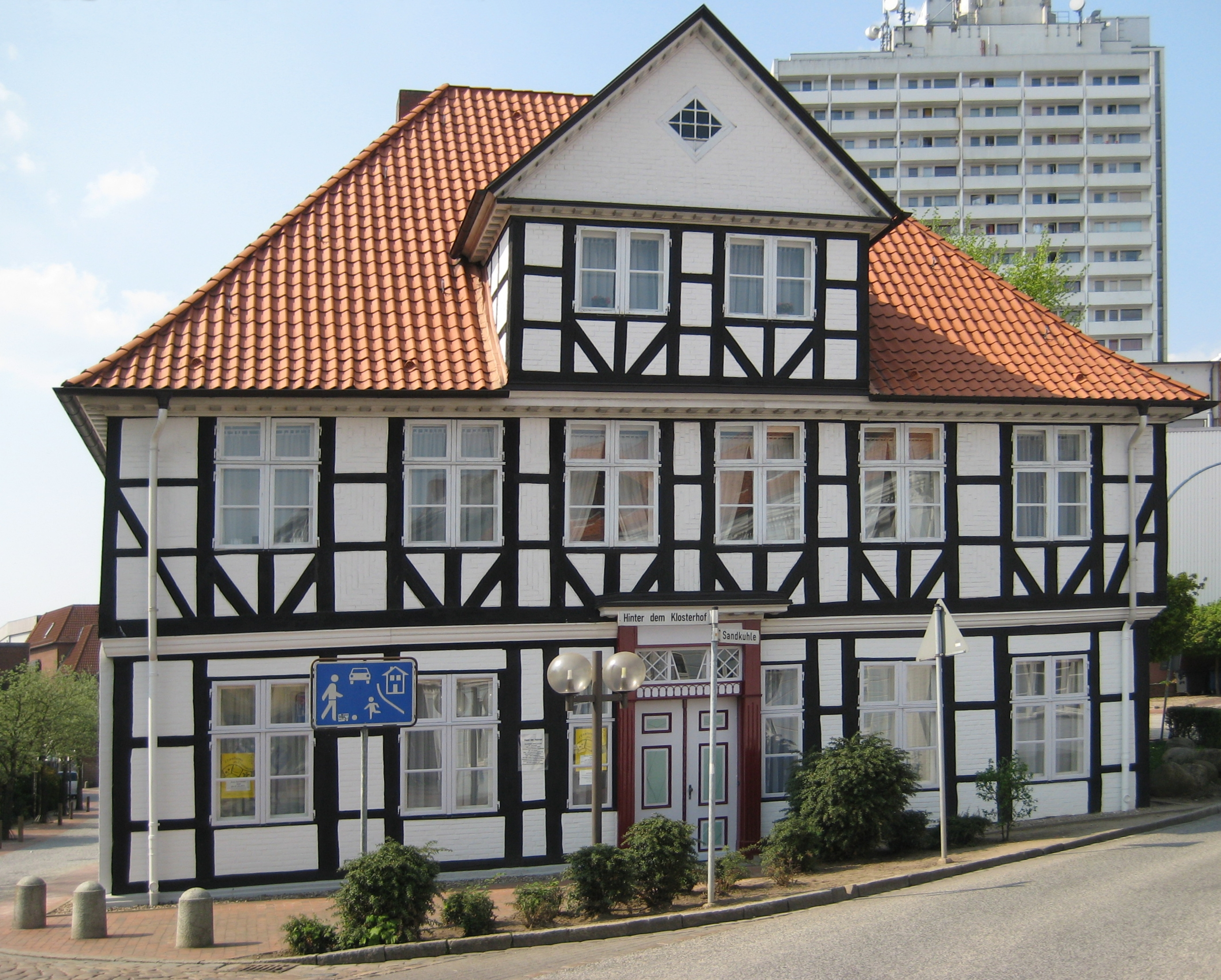
'Haus der Heimat' Museum

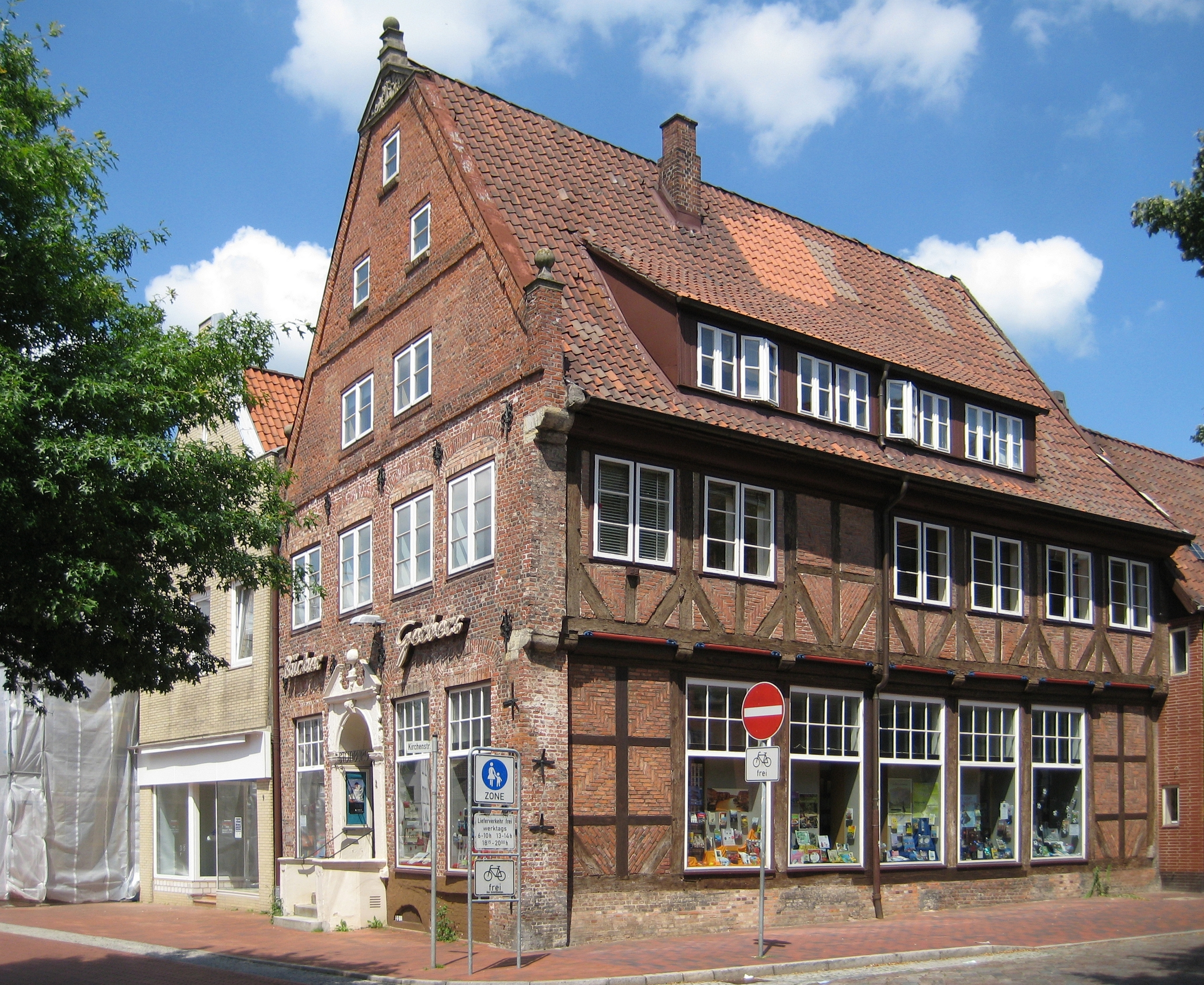
Half-timbered house in the city centre

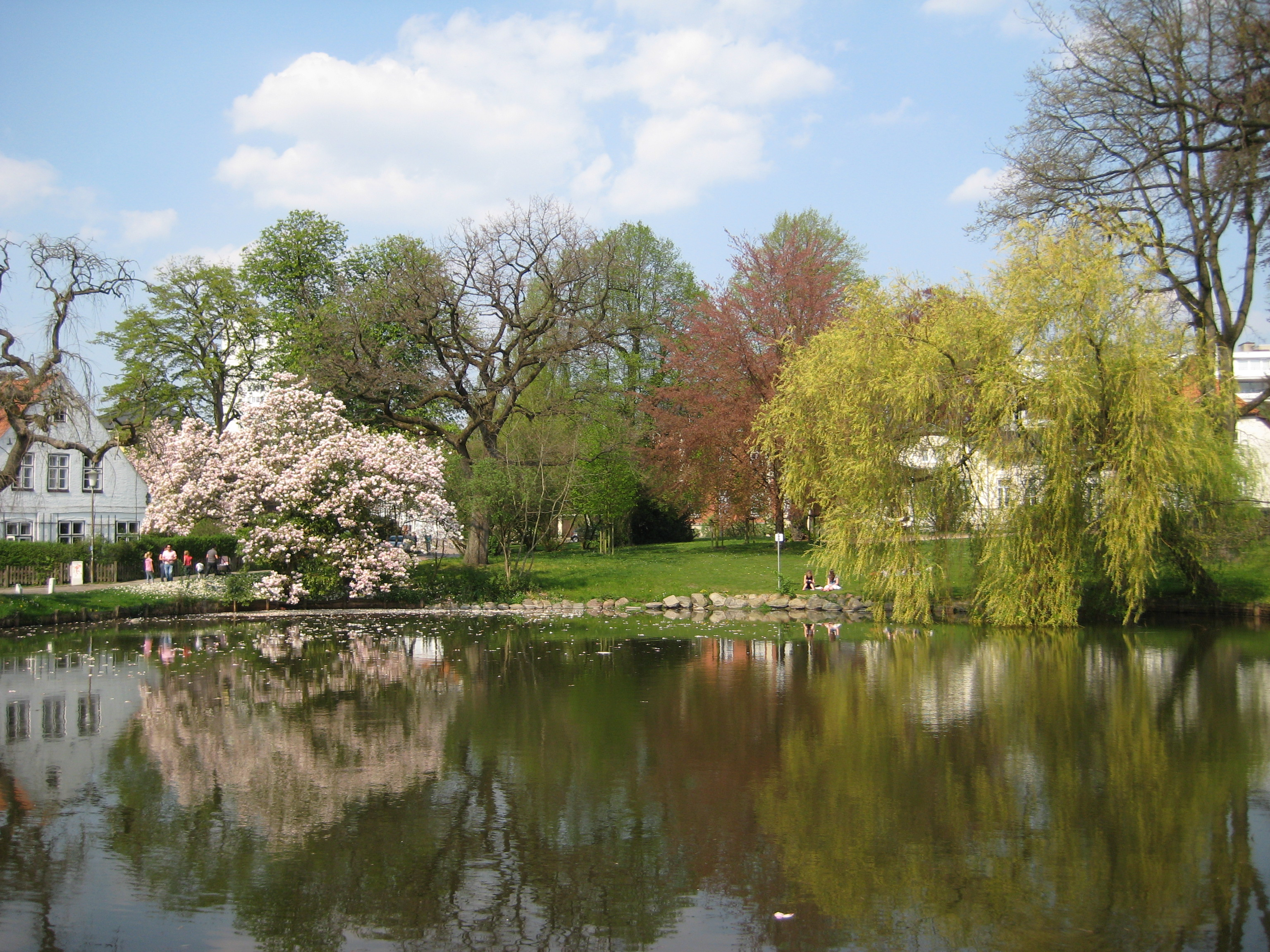
Monastery courtyard

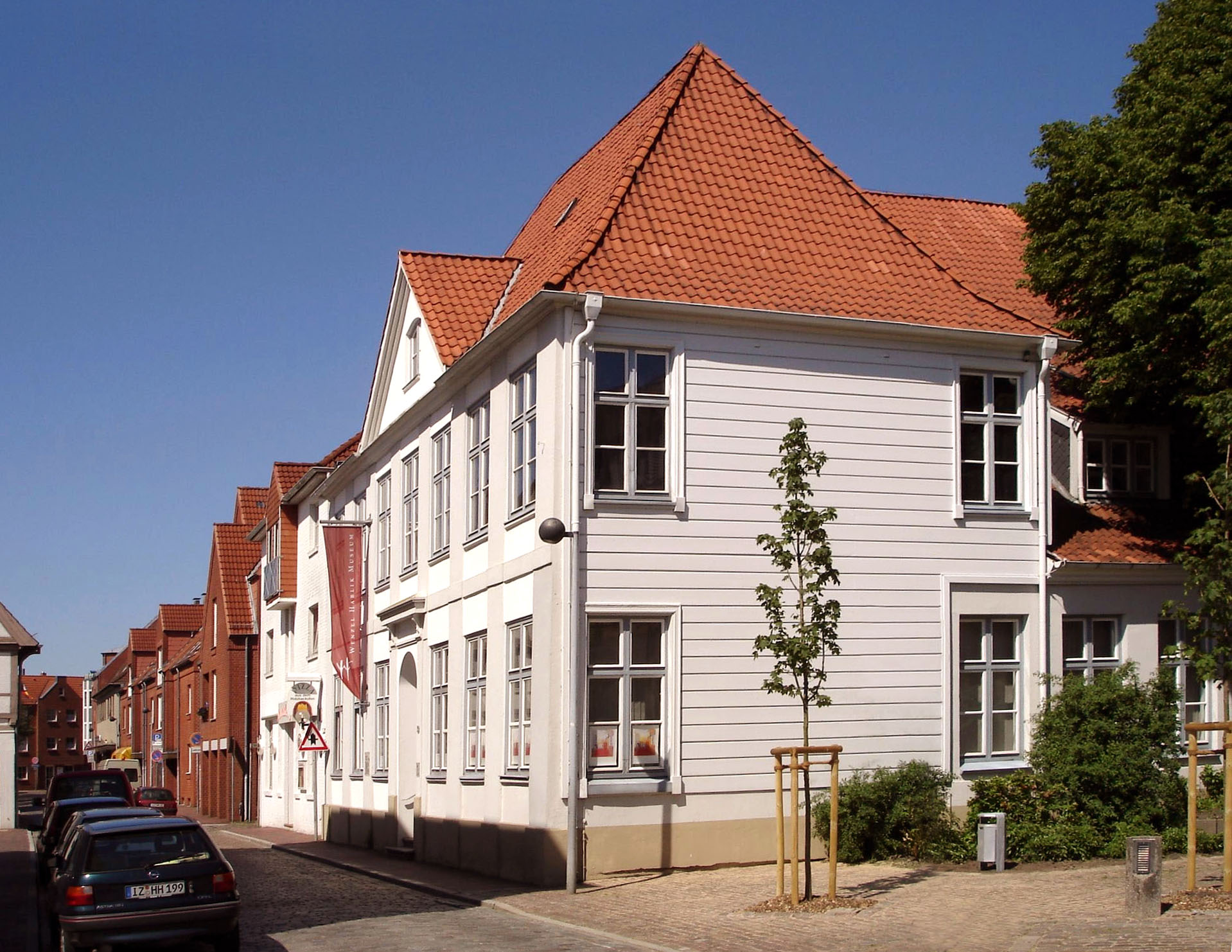
Wenzel Hablik Museum

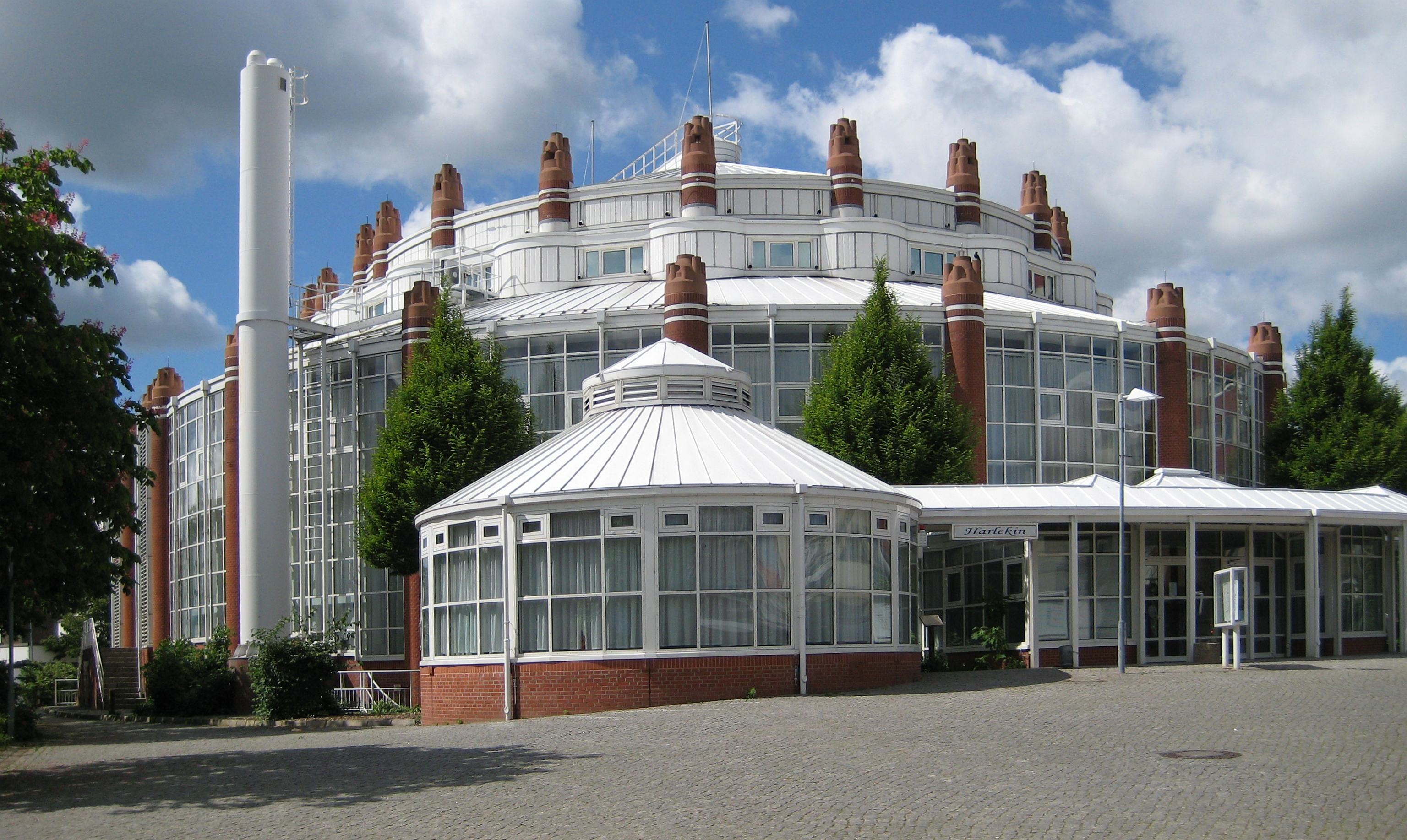
theater itzehoe

Itzehoe is also the location of the Wenzel Hablik Museum which is dedicated to the work of the utopian and expressionist artist architect Wenzel Hablik, who settled in Itzehoe in 1907, where he pursued architectural and interior design projects. Hablik produced designs for furniture, textiles, tapestries, jewellery, cutlery and wallpaper. In 1917, he married the German weaver and textile designer Elisabeth Lindemann (1879–1960). They shared a workshop and a studio in Itzehoe.

== Theatre ==
Theatre has been performed in Itzehoe for at least two hundred years. Even Hans Christian Andersen attended several plays during his stays in Itzehoe in 1843 and 1844. The first permanent theatre was located on Reichenstraße from the 1890s onwards, and since September 1992 it has been housed in the newly built theatre itzehoe in the city centre. It was designed by Gottfried Böhm and built at a cost of approximately €20 million. It seats between 570 and 1,100 people, depending on the seating arrangement. The oval, circus tent-like design enhances the theatre's multifunctionality. The repertoire ranges from spoken and musical theatre to ballet, dance theatre, cabaret, pantomime and shows to chamber and symphony concerts. In addition, children's and youth theatre performances, as well as the possibility of holding congresses, conferences, seminars, trade fairs and similar events, make this striking building a community centre. In 2017, the theatre was recognised as a cultural monument. In August 2009, the Itzehoe Theatre served as a ‘recording studio’ for Chinese pianist Lang Lang, who recorded a CD there.

== Transport ==
Itzehoe is situated at the Marsh Railway and offers connections to Hamburg and the island of Sylt.

During the period up to and including the Wacken Open Air festival many festival goers depart for the festival from Itzehoe using the 'Metal Shuttle Bus’, which leaves from near Itzehoe station. During this time the town can become very overcrowded and inundated with traffic.

== Economy ==
According to a study conducted by the University of Cologne, Itzehoe already offered the best climate for start-ups in Germany in 2007. The Fraunhofer Institute for Silicon Technology (ISIT) and the Society for Technology Promotion Itzehoe mbH (IZET Innovation Centre Itzehoe) are among the most important economic factors in the entire region. As a result, a number of well-known high-tech companies in the fields of computer chip and battery cell manufacturing and renewable energies have settled in Itzehoe, mainly in the ‘InnoQuarter’ industrial park around the ISIT. These include the companies Vishay, Prokon and CustomCells. In 2025, an additional university chair for battery cell research was established, which is based at ISIT.

Other major companies in the city include Itzehoer Versicherungen, Pano Verschluss GmbH and the pump manufacturer Flowserve SIHI. Alliance Healthcare Deutschland (formerly Andreae-Noris Zahn / ANZAG), the cement manufacturer Holcim and plants belonging to the pharmaceutical manufacturer Pohl-Boskamp have sites near the city. The largest single employer is the Itzehoe Clinic, with approximately 3,000 employees.

== Twin towns – sister cities ==
Itzehoe is twinned with:

- Cirencester, England, United Kingdom
- La Couronne, France
- Pasłęk, Poland

== Notable people ==
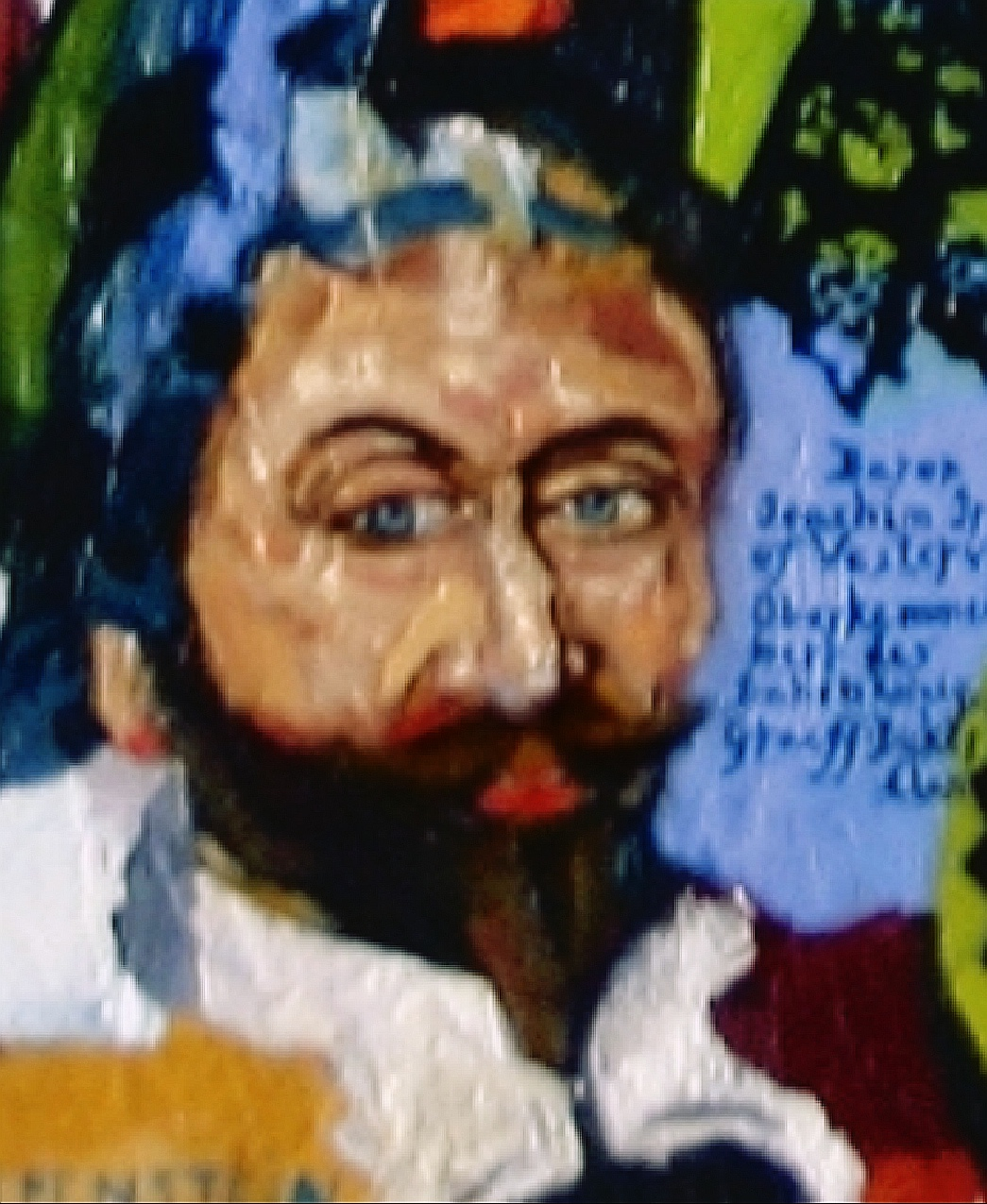
Joachim Irgens von Westervick painting by M L Gräff)

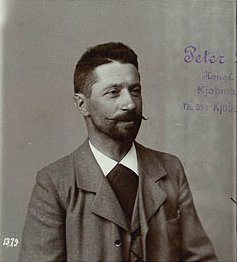
Hans Peder Pedersen-Dan, 1901

- Adolf IV of Holstein (before 1205–1261), a Count of Schauenburg (1225–1238)
- Johannes Loccenius (1598–1677), a German jurist and historian
- Joachim Irgens von Westervick (1611–1675), Dano-Norwegian official and estate owner, important financial magnate and entrepreneur
- Bendix Grodtschilling (ca 1620 – 1690), a Danish painter and carpenter.
- Werner Fabricius (1633–1679), organist and composer
- Bendix Grodtschilling the Younger (1655–1707), a Danish painter.
- Ludvig Nicolaus von Scheele (1796–1874), a Danish statesman, Danish Foreign Minister, 1855 to 1857.
- Carl Julian (von) Graba (1799–1874), German lawyer and ornithologist who visited and studied the Faroe Islands
- Peter Christoph Hagemann (1810–1853), neoclassical Danish architect
- Hans Peder Pedersen-Dan (1859–1939), a Danish sculptor.
- Elisabeth Lindemann (1879–1960), weaver, textile designer and photographer; lived locally from 1917.
- Bruno Adler, (DE Wiki) (1896–1954), Bishop of the German Christians
- Erika Thimey (1910–2006), dancer and dance educator, mainly based in Washington, D.C.
- Sabine Sinjen (1942–1995), film actress
- Jerzy Janeczek (1944–2021), Polish theater and film actor.
- Antje Blumenthal (born 1947), politician
- Sylvia Convey (born 1948), Latvian-Australian artist
- Olaf Berner (born 1949), teacher and handball player
- Heiger Ostertag (born 1953), historian and novelist.
- Thomas Gerull (born 1962), fencer, team silver medalist at the 1988 Summer Olympics
- Sven Butenschön (born 1976), ice hockey player
- Lisa Tomaschewsky (born 1988), film and TV actress.
- Nina Eim (born 1998), Triathlete
