= Sylvia Convey =

Latvian Australian female painter (born 1948)

- Born: 1948 (age 77–78); Germany

Sylvia Convey (born 1948) is a Latvian Australian self-taught artist known for her paintings, quilts and dolls.

== Life ==
Sylvia Convey was born in a refugee camp at Itzehoe near Hamburg, Germany in 1948. With her parents and elder sister she sailed to Australia on the Skaugum in early 1950. They were part of the first wave of immigrants to arrive in Australia after World War II, joining a large group of displaced Latvians that settled in Australia in the late 40s and early 50s.

== Work ==
As an outsider artist, her images are derived from her own day-to-day and oneiric experiences. She includes references to her ancestral heritage. Eroticism is also a dominant theme in her oeuvre.

A recurring thread in her work has been the blurring of boundaries between art forms. As a painter, she rejected the primacy of canvas and used non-conventional surfaces. As a printmaker, she has used textiles as much as paper, while her interest in sculpture found expression in cloth dolls characterized by exuberant forms and materials. She approached quilt making in a spontaneous, rather than formal manner as it gave her lifelong love of fabric and colour complete expression. Her practice emphasized the tactile qualities of cloth, including tearing, cutting, printing, and painting it to create richly textured forms.

== Collections and exhibits ==
Convey's work has been acquired by several institutions including the National Gallery of Australia, Iwalewa Haus at the University of Bayreuth and the Canberra Museum and Gallery.

Since 1972, she has exhibited in Australia, Germany, the United States, and France. Her work was part of the landmark exhibition Australian outsiders at the Halle St. Pierre in Paris in 2006. Convey's work was included in the 2010 exhibition 13 Australian Outsider Artists at Callan Park Gallery. In 2015, a survey exhibition of Sylvia Convey and her husband's work titled Double Vision was held at the Orange Regional Gallery.
