= Itzehoe Monastery =

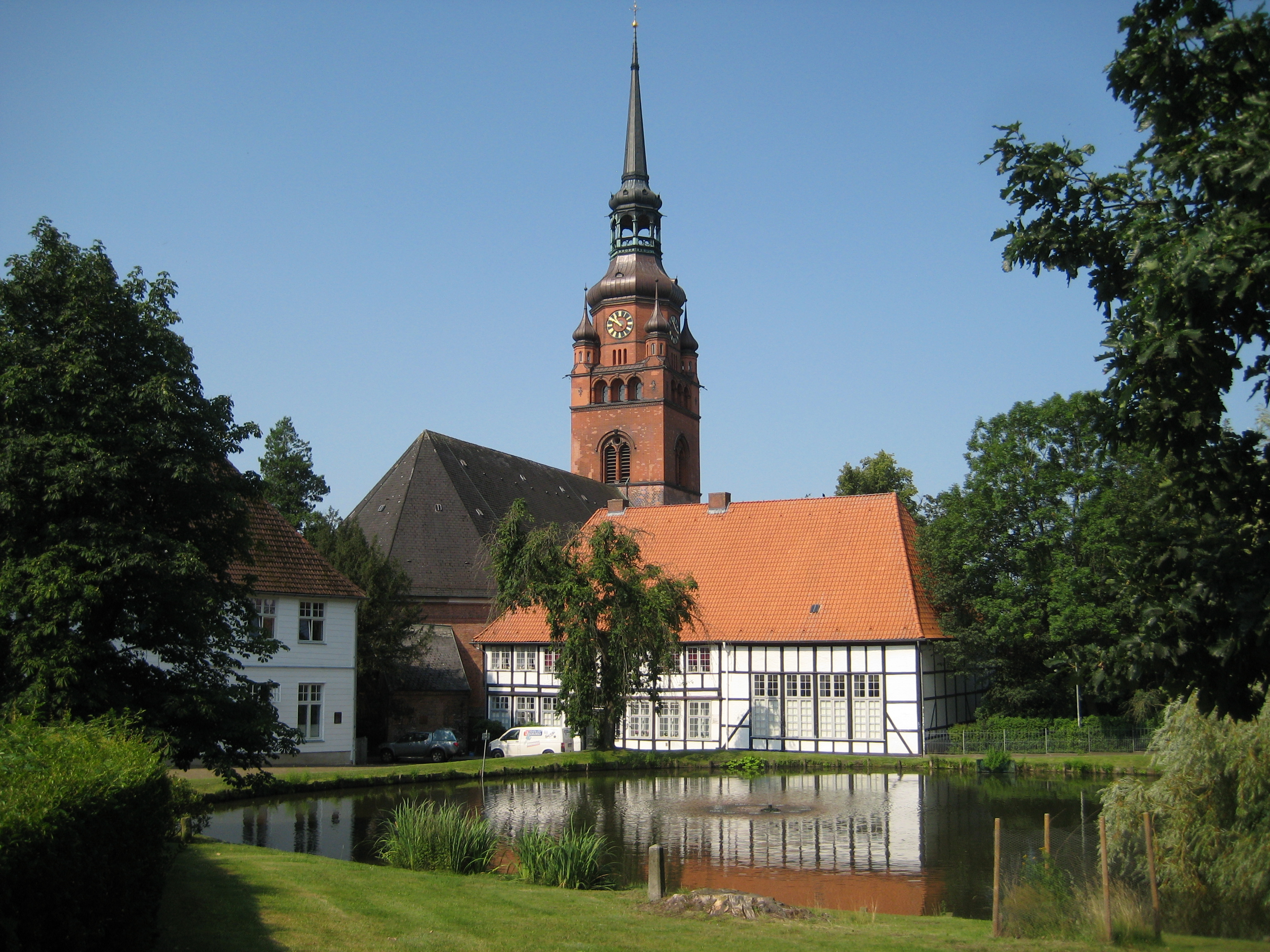
- Monastery courtyard with the monastery pond and St. Laurentii Church in the background

- 53°55′26″N 9°31′09″E
- Location: Itzehoe , Schleswig-Holstein, Germany
- Denomination: Protestant
- Previous denomination: Catholic (Cistercians); Protestant
- Website: www.kloster-itzehoe.de

History
- Founded: 1230s

The Itzehoe Monastery is a former Cistercian abbey in Itzehoe, which was converted into a noble Protestant ladies' convent after the Reformation. The convent is headed by an abbess.

== History ==
The monastery was originally founded in the 1230s on a mound near Ivenfleth at the mouth of the Stör, which had not yet been diked at that time. In 1263, the Cistercian nuns moved to Itzehoe, presumably because of the occasional flooding. The monastery was endowed with land when it was founded and was able to expand its holdings over the following centuries. The Itzehoe convent was also the landlord and judge in many areas and was able to demand taxes from the people living there; however, these areas did not form a spatially contiguous estate. Through donations and purchases, the monastery became the sole landowner of the village of Langwedel, more than 50 km away, in 1383. The free farmers had to pay their taxes quarterly; this legal relationship was only terminated in 1867 under Prussian administration.

After the Reformation, the monastery was converted into a noble Protestant ladies' convent (Damenstift) in 1541, which it remains to this day. The nuns are unmarried or widowed women, mostly from noble families. At the head of the convent is an (usually) elected abbess, supported by a prioress. The so-called Verbitter represents the legal and economic interests of the convent vis-à-vis third parties. In 1683, Princess Dorothea Louise of Sonderburg-Augustenburg (1663–1721) was appointed abbess by Christian V, King of Denmark and Norway. She was not able to take up her post until 1687; nine years later (1696), she built the prestigious abbess's residence (Klosterhof 7).

In Itzehoe, the monastery courtyard near the St. Laurentii Church, where former monastery buildings still stand today, and the rest of the area belonging to the monastery formed one of several jurisdictions and eventually an independent rural municipality, which hindered the expansion of the city of Itzehoe into the 20th century. The last area of this independent municipality was the monastery courtyard, which formed an enclave in the middle of Itzehoe. It was finally incorporated into Itzehoe in 1935/36. The monastery has retained primarily land and forest property. For example, it owns the land on which the Itzehoe swimming center was built, based on a heritable contract with the noble monastery. The Stormsteich, which is leased to the town of Itzehoe, also belongs to the monastery. It also owns the Itzehoe monastery forest and 75 hectares of forest 20 kilometers north of Itzehoe. Until 2013, the Hackstruck within Itzehoe also belonged to the monastery, but was sold to a local hospital.

== Gallery ==
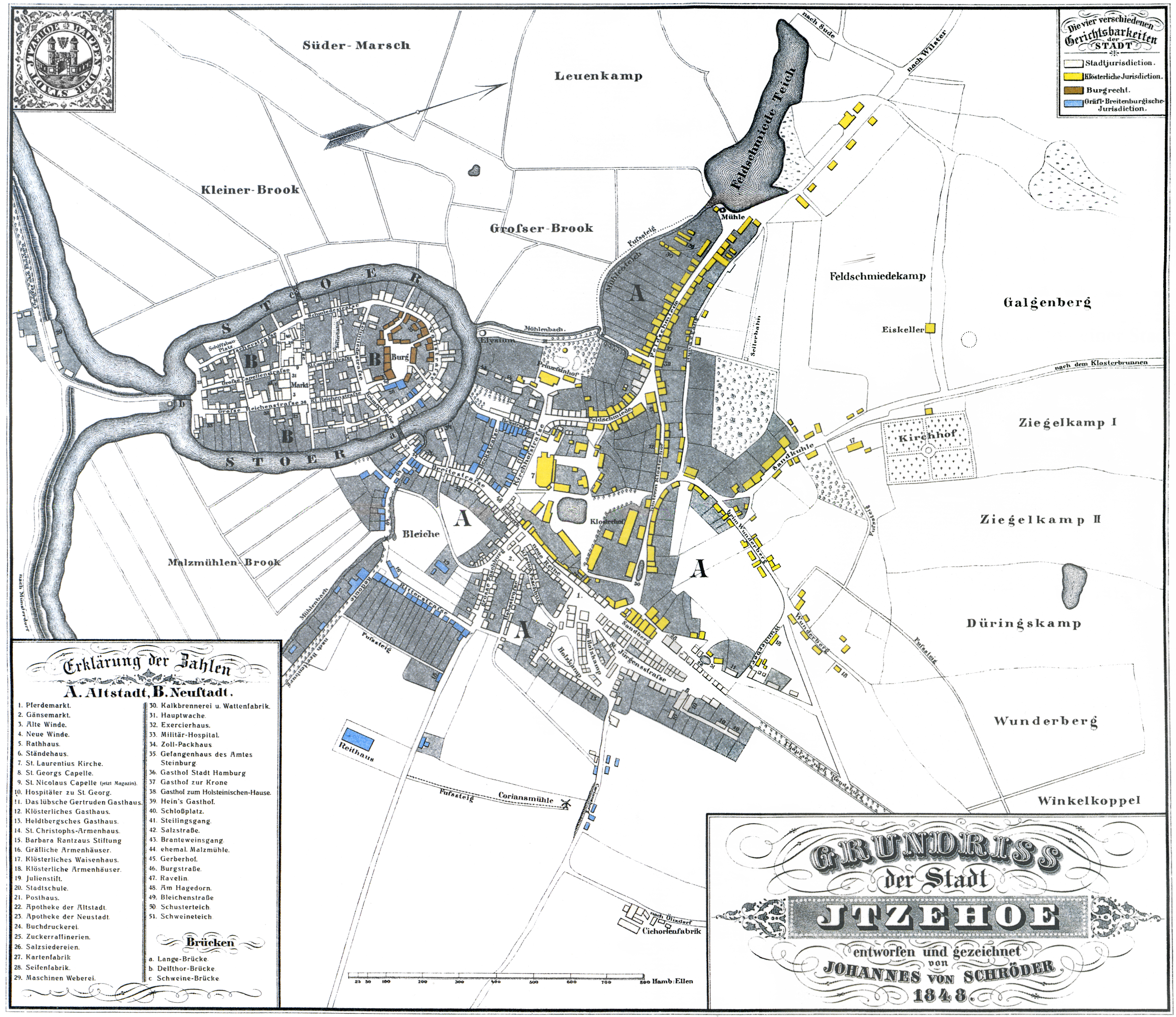
The properties belonging to the monastery's judicial district are shown in yellow on this map from 1848

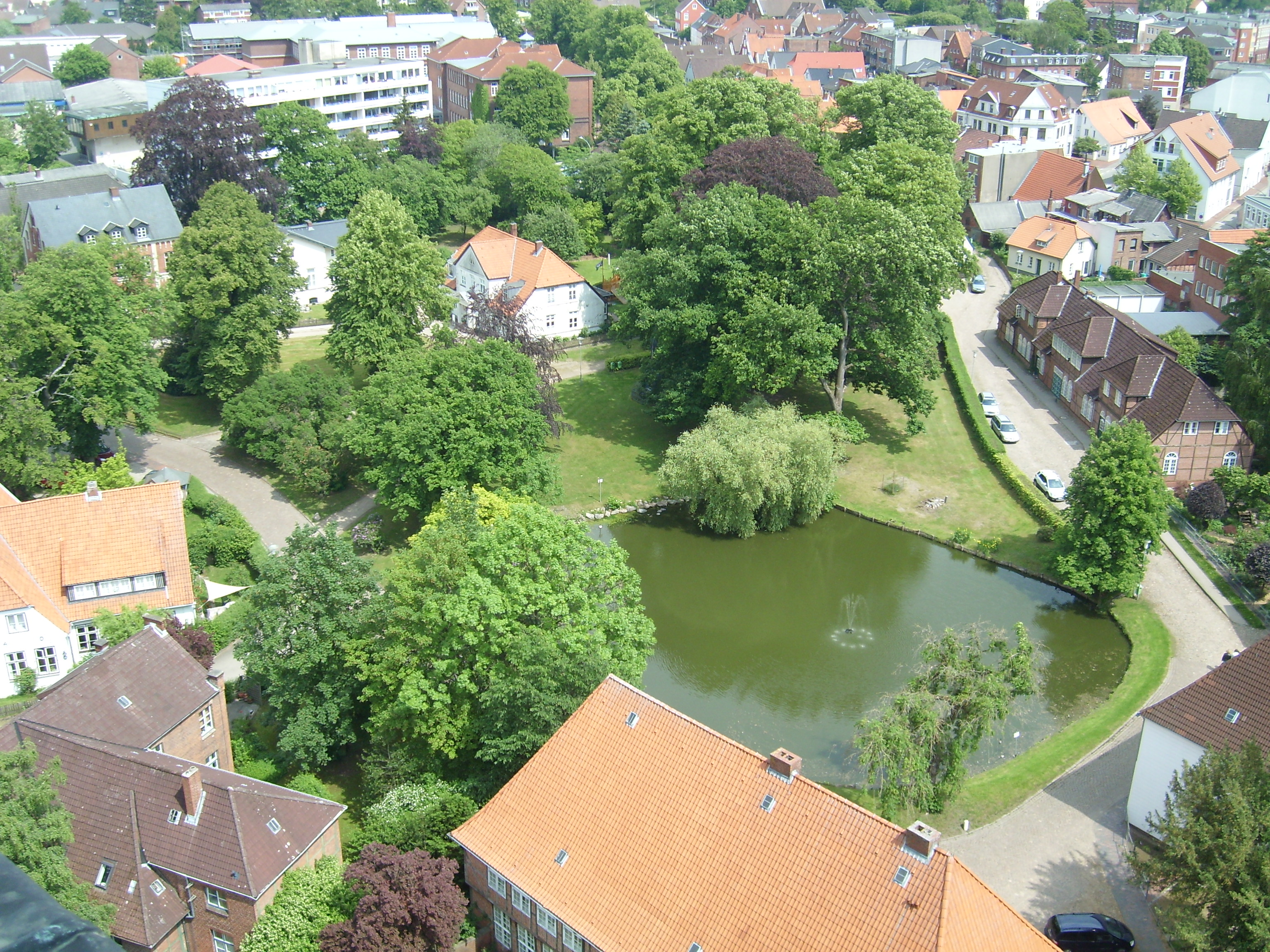
Monastery courtyard with the monastery pond seen from the steeple of St. Laurentii Church

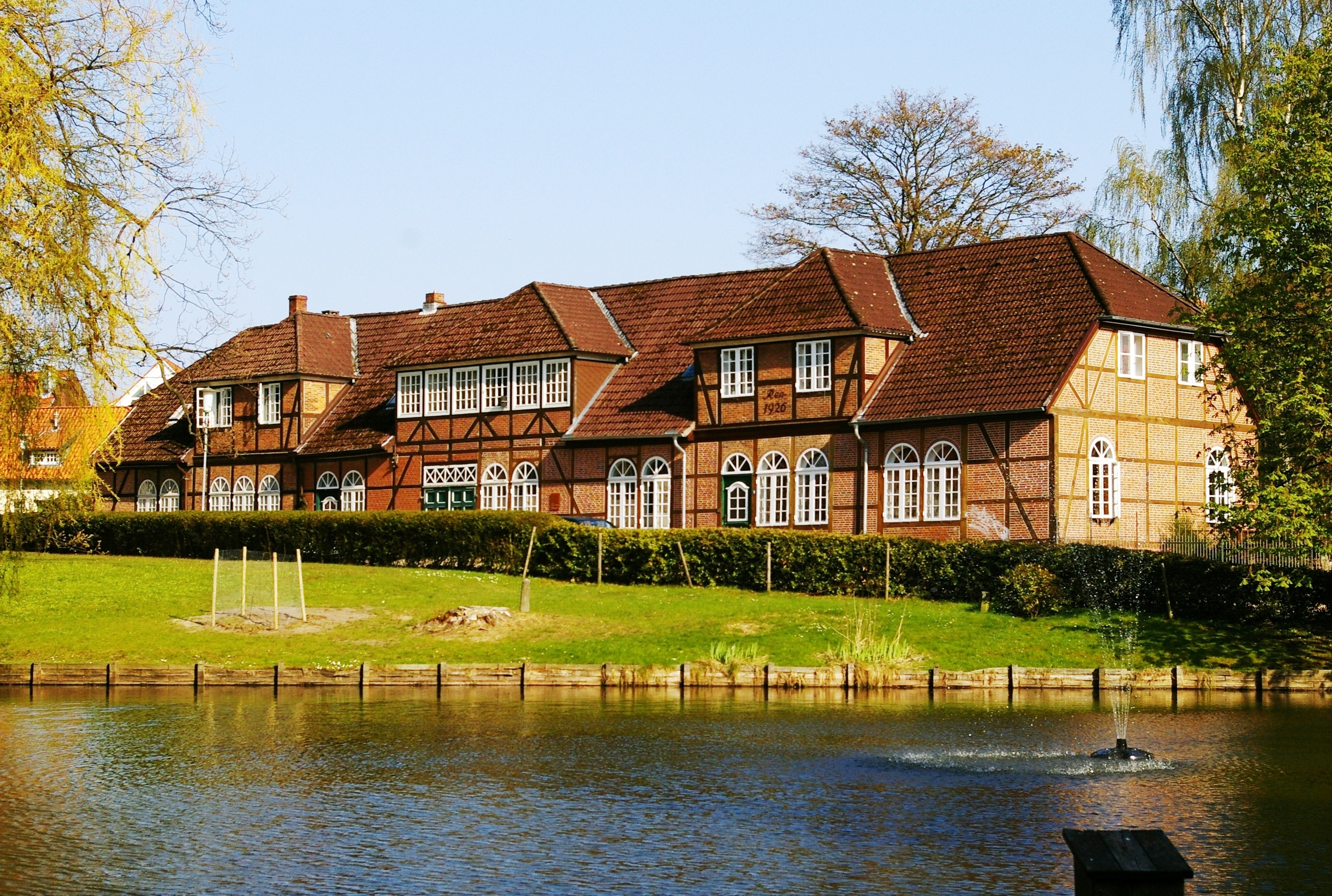
Carriage house of Itzehoe Monastery

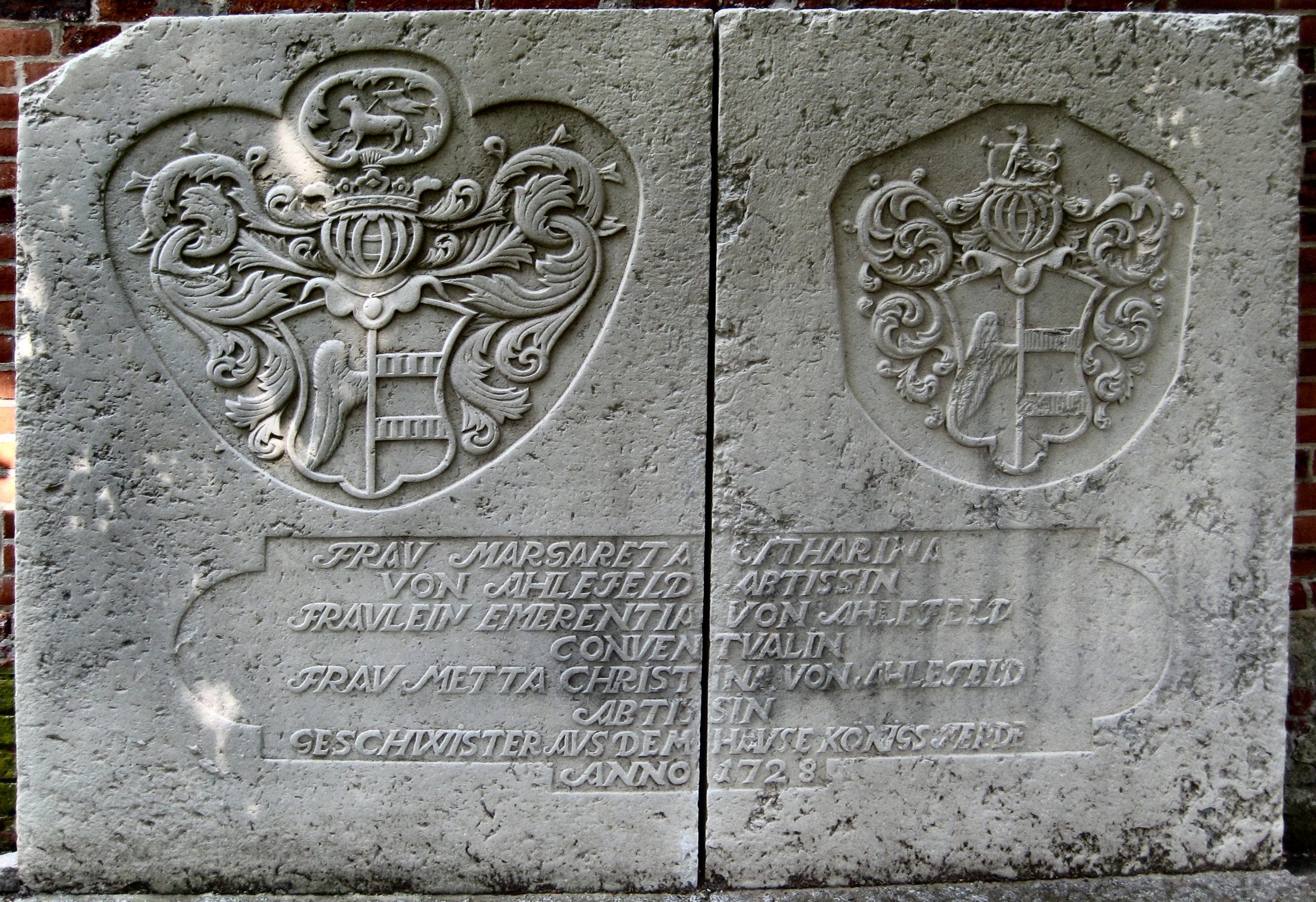
Gravestone for abbesses from the noble Ahlefeldt family
