= Wenzel Hablik =

German painter

Wenzel August Hablik
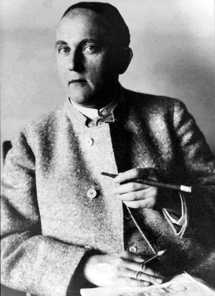
- Hablik (c. 1923)
- Born: 4 August 1881; Brüx, Bohemia, Austria-Hungary
- Died: 23 March 1934 (aged 52); Itzehoe, Schleswig-Holstein, Germany
- Other names: Wenceslav Hablik, Wilhelm August Hablik
- Occupations: painter, graphic artist, architect, designer, craftsman
- Spouse: Elisabeth Lindemann

Wenzel August Hablik, also known as Wenceslav Hablik and Wilhelm August Hablik (4 August 1881 – 23 March 1934), was a painter, graphic artist, architect, designer and craftsman, associated with German Expressionism.

Some of his paintings include Where from? Where to?, Starry Sky, Attempt, and Utopian Buildings.

== Early life and education ==
Hablik was born in Brüx, Bohemia (now Most in the Czech Republic) on 4 August 1881. In later life he recalled that at the age of six, he found a specimen of crystal, and saw in it "magical castles and mountains" that would later appear in his art.

More pragmatically, he trained as a master cabinetmaker in Teplice, Vienna, and Prague.

== Career ==
He settled in Itzehoe, Germany, in 1907, where he pursued architectural and interior design projects. Hablik produced designs for furniture, textiles, tapestries, jewelry, cutlery, and wallpapers. In 1917, he married German weaver and textile designer, Elisabeth Lindemann (1879–1960); they shared a workshop and studio in Itzehoe.

Hablik, a member of the Deutscher Künstlerbund, became best known, however, for his etchings and paintings and his links with major German Expressionist figures and movements, including the Arbeitsrat für Kunst (English: Workers Council for Art) and the Glass Chain movement. Hablik maintained a strong lifelong interest in crystals and geological forms generally. His visual art is notable for its highly imaginative and fanciful aspects; he created depictions of temples, flying cities, and crystal chasms.

In 1909, Hablik published his Creative Forces ("Schaffende Kräfte"), "a portfolio of twenty etchings portraying a voyage through an imaginary universe of crystalline structures" that "represents the most significant accomplishment of his career." Hablik also published other portfolios of his etchings, The Sea ("Das Meer", 1918) and Architectural Cycle — Utopia ("Cyklus Architektur — Utopie," 1925). Some of Hablik's designs, particularly of lamps and small sculptures, relate to and express the "utopian crystalline" forms of his etchings.

A catalogue in the artist's autograph lists some 600 artworks; about 250 oil paintings by Hablik are known at present. He produced portraits, landscapes, nude figures, and pictures showing Symbolist influences. A tour of South America in 1925 to 1926 inspired him to create paintings of cactuses and flowers.

Hablik died at Itzehoe in 1934. The Wenzel Hablik Museum was established in the city of Itzehoe in 1995. The museum contains much of his art, as well as his collections of crystals and minerals, seashells and snails.

Hablik's Paintings

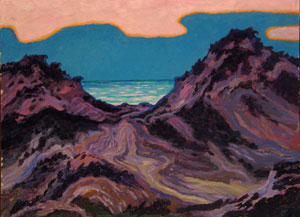
Sylt, Sunset, Dunes, (1912)

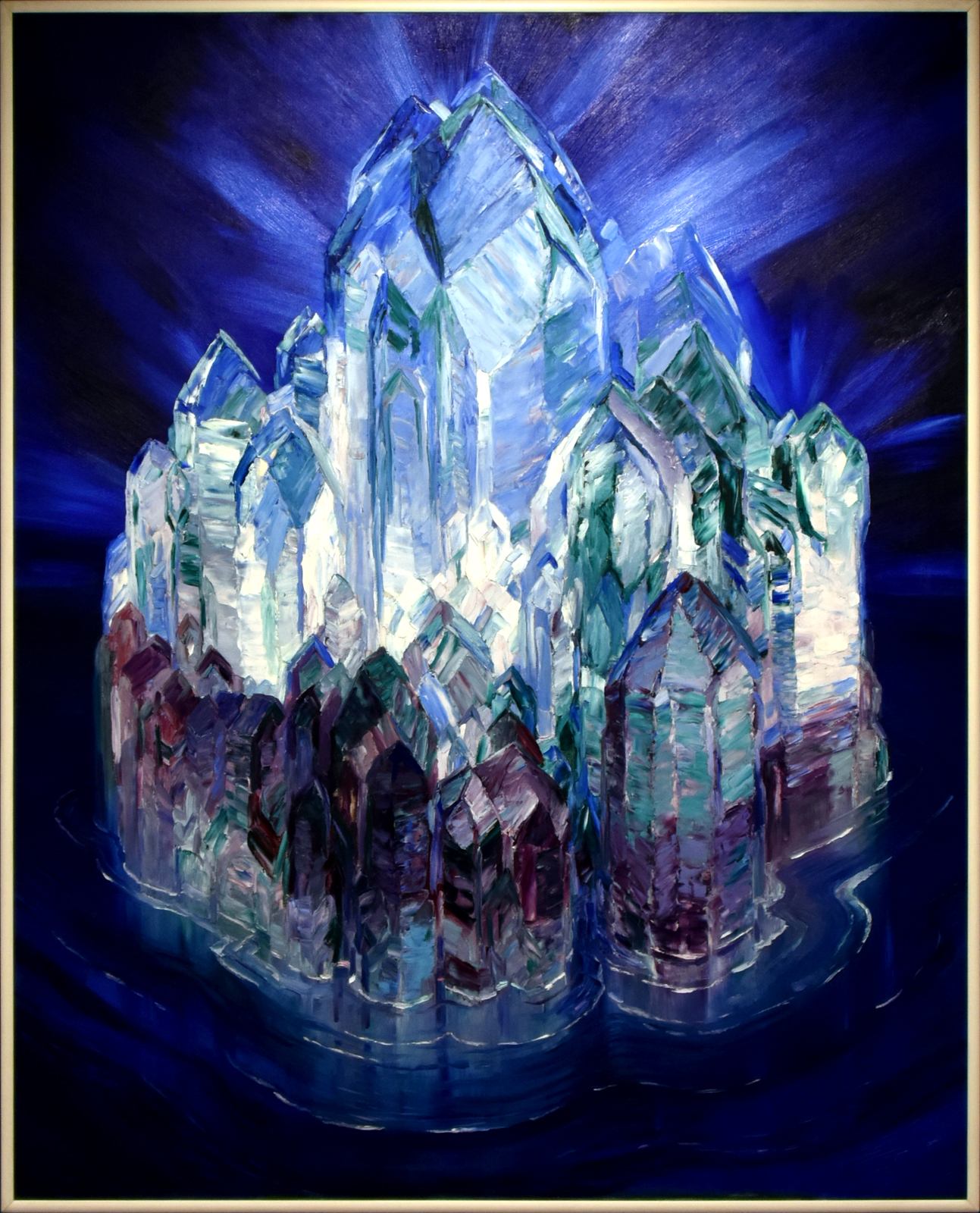
Crystal Castle in the Sea, (1914)

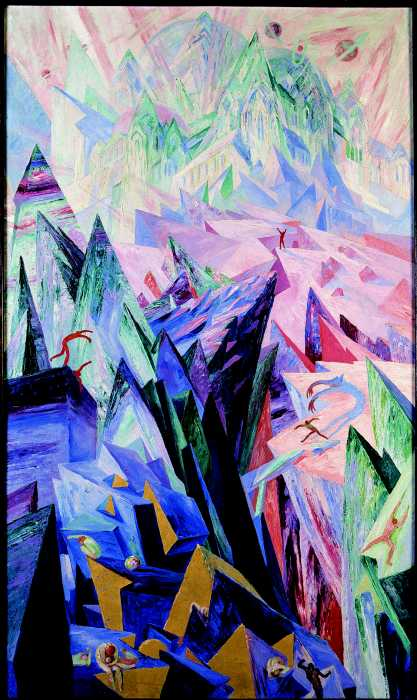
The Path of the Genius, (1918)

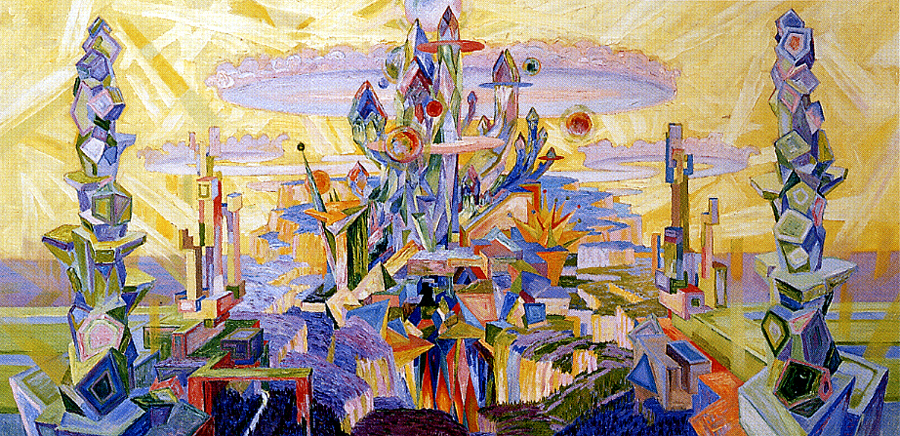
Cycle's Utopian Architectures. Airplane Towers, Silos, Artist Apartments, (1921)

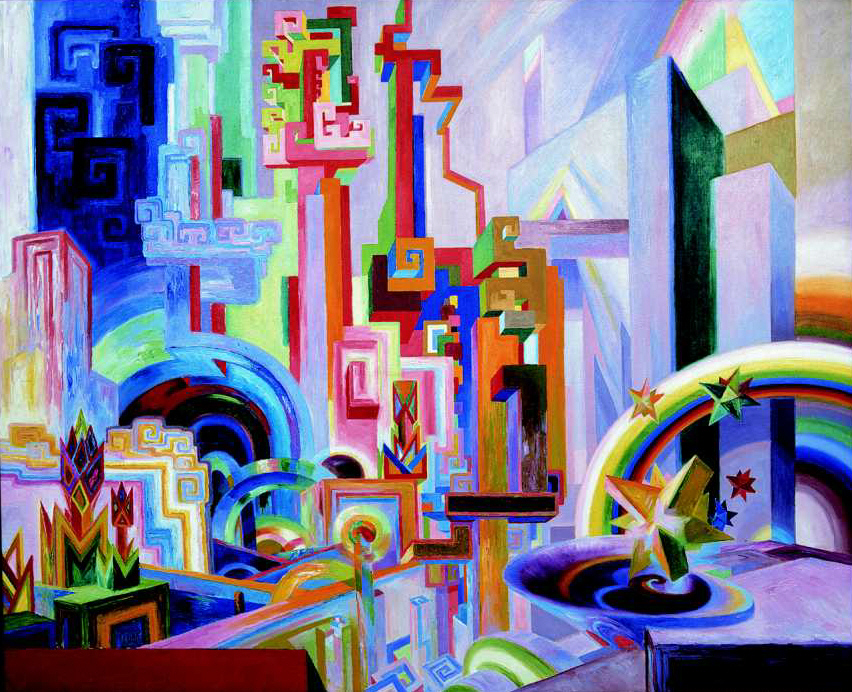
Big Colorful Utopian Constructions, (1922)
