= Elisabeth Lindemann =

German weaver, textile designer and photographer

- Born: Abeline Elisabeth Lindemann; August 23, 1879; Nordhastedt, Schleswig-Holstein, Germany
- Died: August 15, 1960 (aged 80); Itzehoe, Schleswig-Holstein, Germany
- Other names: Elisabeth Hablik-Lindemann, Elisabeth Hablik, Lisbeth Hablik-Lindemann
- Spouse: Wenzel Hablik (m. 1917)

Elisabeth Lindemann, also known as Elisabeth Hablik-Lindemann (1879–1960), was a German weaver, textile designer and photographer. She has been credited with creating the first modern jacquard technique. She brought traditional weaving techniques closer to contemporary tastes by modifying colors and patterns. She has been considered by experts as the "mother of hand weaving".

== Biography ==
Elisabeth Lindemann was born on August 23, 1879, in Nordhastedt in Schleswig-Holstein, Germany. From 1897 to 1900, she studied fabric and textile design in Dresden under the siblings Gertrude and Erich Kleinhempel. In 1902, she spent three months in Stockholm learning the traditions of Swedish textiles at the Handarbetes Vänner Weaving School.

By May 1902, Lindemann was leading the Meldorf Museum Weaving Workshop, (Meldorfer Museumsweberei), in Meldorf and four years later she created the first modern jacquard textile technique. She maintained her role at the Meldorf Museum Weaving Workshop until 1907.

In 1917, she married Wenzel Hablik, and together they moved to the town of Itzehoe to open a craft workshop.

She was awarded the Officer's Cross of the Order of Merit of the Federal Republic of Germany for her work.

Lindemann died on August 15, 1960, in Itzehoe. After her death, her daughter moved the weaving studio to Pondicherry, India, and continued to produce designs by Elisabeth Lindemann as Hablik Handicraft.
