= Heiger Ostertag =

Dr. Heiger Ostertag
- Born: 1953 (age 72–73); Itzehoe, Germany
- Occupations: Novelist, Historian
- Known for: Notable novels and historical research

Dr. Heiger Ostertag (born 1953) is a German novelist.

Born in 1953 in Itzehoe, he joined the German Air Force after finishing high school and trained as an officer in flight specialties. Afterwards he attended the Albert Ludwig University in Freiburg, Germany, where he majored in Scandinavian Studies, German Philology and History. Ostertag worked as a lecturer in Munich and conducted research at the German Armed Forces Military History Research Office as Colonel. He has been teaching in southern Germany for many years and has published widely. As a novelist, his work has attracted nationwide attention.

== Publications ==
=== Fiction ===
- 1991 Flugschar (Air Fleet)
- 2005 Fallender Schatten (Falling Shadow)
- 2006 Fliehende Zeit (Fleeing Time)
- 2007 Was bleibt (The Journey of Jusup W.)
- 2007 Fließende Nebel (Flowing Fog)

=== Non-fiction ===
- 1990 Education, Elite ideals, Purposes, and Reality in the Officer Corps of the German Empire 1871–1918
- 1992 Selected Military Operations and their Historic Bases
- 1993 Military History
- 1993 Potsdam. State, Army, Residence

He also wrote many trade journal publications.
