= Jerzy Janeczek =

Polish theater and film actor (1944–2021)

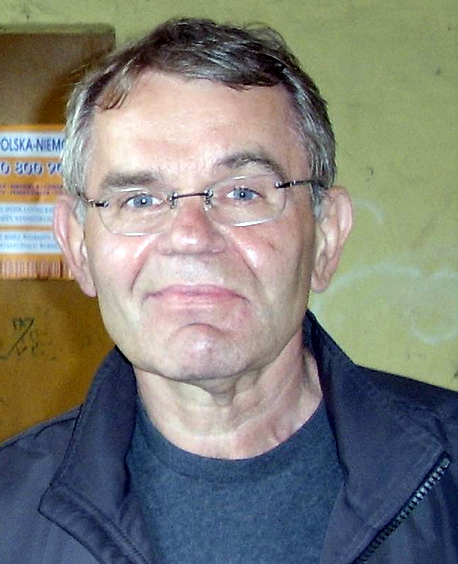
- Born: 22 March 1944; Itzehoe, Schleswig-Holstein, Prussia, Germany
- Died: 11 July 2021 (aged 77)
- Occupation: Actor

Jerzy Janeczek (22 March 1944 – 11 July 2021) was a Polish theater and film actor.

== Biography ==
Janeczek was born in Itzehoe, Schleswig-Holstein, Prussia, Germany. He finished the National Film School in Łódź in its Faculty of Drama.

He performed in theaters in Wrocław, Kalisz, Koszalin and Warsaw. In 1987 he was dismissed from the Dramatic Theater in Warsaw by Zbigniew Zapasiewicz. By the end of the 1980s, Janeczek migrated to the United States, and in 2007 he returned to Poland.

Janeczek died aged 77 in July 2021.
