= Bundesstraße 204 =

Federal highway in Germany

B 204
- Bundesstraße 204
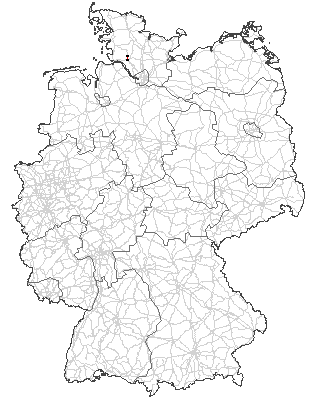

Route information
- Length: 50.4 km (31.3 mi)

Major junctions
- Northwest end: Heide
- Southeast end: Itzehoe

Location
- Country: Germany
- States: Schleswig-Holstein

Highway system
- Roads in Germany; Autobahns; List; Federal; List; State; E-roads

The Bundesstraße 204 was a former German federal road or Bundesstraße that served as a link between northwest–southeast route, connecting Heide, Albersdorf, Hanerau-Hademarschen, Schenefeld and Itzehoe in western Schleswig-Holstein. The road was completely downgraded due to the construction of the A 23 motorway.

== Route ==
The former B 204 begins in the eastern part of Heide at an intersection with the B 203. The route goes southeast through the towns of Nordhastedt and Albersdorf. Then it crosses the Kiel Canal at the Grünenthal High Bridge. Afterwards passes the towns of Hanerau-Hademarschen, Gokels, Warringholz and Schenefeld where it had connections with the B 430. Then it continues straight to the city of Itzehoe where it reached the B 5 and the B 206. The section between Heide and Gokels was downgraded to the L 316. The section between Gokels and Itzehoe-Edendorf was downgraded to the L 127. The section between IZ-Edendorf and the B 5 was upgraded to the A 23 motorway.

== Major junctions ==
| State | District | Location | km | mi | Exit | Name | Destinations | Notes |
|---|---|---|---|---|---|---|---|---|
| Schleswig-Holstein | Dithmarschen | Heide | | | | Heide-Rendsburger Straße | B 203 – Büsum, Heide, Husum, Brunsbüttel, Kiel, Rendsburg | former Route of the B 204 cross-level intersection |
| Schleswig-Holstein | No junctions along Nordhastedt, Arkebek and Albersdorf | | | | | | | |
| Schleswig-Holstein | Steinburg | Beldorf | | | | Grünenthal High Bridge | Kiel Canal | former Route of the B 204 |
| Schleswig-Holstein | Steinburg | No junctions along Hanerau-Hademarschen, Gokels and Warringholz | | | | | | |
| Schleswig-Holstein | Steinburg | Schenefeld | | | | Schenefeld | B 430 – Neumünster, Hohenwestedt, ( A 23) | former Route of the B 204 cross-level intersection |
| Schleswig-Holstein | Steinburg | Pöschendorf | | | | Hadenfeld | B 430 – Hamburg/Heide ( A 7), Wacken | former Route of the B 204 The B 430 didn't run here before the downgrade of the B 204 roundabout |
| Schleswig-Holstein | Steinburg | No junctions along Kaisborstel and Ottenbüttel | | | | | | |
| Schleswig-Holstein | Steinburg | Itzehoe | | | 8 | Itzehoe-Nord | A 23 – Heide | former Route of the B 204 The A 23 didn't run here before the downgrade of the B 204 |
| Schleswig-Holstein | Steinburg | Itzehoe | | | 9 | Itzehoe-Mitte | A 23 – Hamburg; B 5 – Brunsbüttel, (Hamburg); B 206 – Lübeck | former Route of the B 204 This junction is now part of the A 23 motorway Before the downgrade of the B 204 the route continued as the B 5 towards Hamburg |
1.000 mi = 1.609 km; 1.000 km = 0.621 mi: Closed/former

== See also ==
- List of federal roads in Germany
