= Hohenlockstedt (Amt) =

Coordinates: 54.133°N 8.850°E

Hohenlockstedt was an Amt ("collective municipality") in the district of Steinburg, in Schleswig-Holstein, Germany. The seat of the Amt was in Hohenlockstedt. In January 2008, it was disbanded, and its municipalities were divided over the Ämter Itzehoe-Land and Kellinghusen.

The Amt Hohenlockstedt consisted of the following municipalities:

1. Hohenlockstedt
2. Lockstedt
3. Lohbarbek
4. Schlotfeld
5. Silzen
6. Winseldorf
