= Aasbüttel =

- Municipality
- Coat of arms

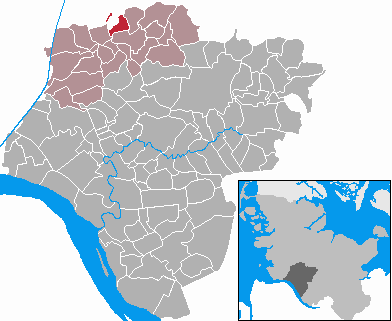
- Location of Aasbüttel within Steinburg district
- Interactive map of Aasbüttel
- Location within Germany Location within Schleswig-Holstein
- Coordinates: 54°3′55″N 9°26′19″E
- Country: Germany
- State: Schleswig-Holstein
- District: Steinburg
- Municipal assoc.: Schenefeld

Government
  - Mayor: Hanno Bräuer

Area
  - Total: 4.53 km^{2} (1.75 sq mi)
- Elevation: 52 m (171 ft)

Population (2025-12-31)
  - Total: 162
  - Density: 35.8/km^{2} (92.6/sq mi)
- Time zone: UTC+01:00 (CET)
  - Summer (DST): UTC+02:00 (CEST)
- Postal codes: 25560
- Dialling codes: 04872, 04892
- Vehicle registration: IZ

Aasbüttel is a municipality in the district of Steinburg, in Schleswig-Holstein, Germany.

== Geography ==
=== Geographic Location ===
The municipal area of Aasbüttel extends within the natural region of the Heide-Itzehoer Geest, northwest of Schenefeld. Situated on the High Geest in Westholstein, the area lies on the watershed between the rivers Elbe, Stör, and historically, Eider (nowadays, the Kiel Canal).

== History ==
In the year 1576, the municipality was first mentioned as Astebutel and belongs to the Büttel localities. The historical Ochsenweg passed through the village from Itzehoe via Hadenfeld, Siezbüttel, Aasbüttel, and Keller towards the West Coast of Schleswig-Holstein. Travelers on the Ochsenweg stayed overnight at the inn "Zur Erholung" in Aasbüttel.

== Politics ==
=== Municipal Council ===
In the municipal election on May 14, 2023, a total of seven seats were allocated. These once again all went to the General Voters' Association Aasbüttel. The voter turnout was 61.3%.

== Coat of Arms ==
Blazon: "In blue an elevated golden peak, therein a narrow pierced wavy thread, from which a green ash leaf grows."

The basic color yellow refers to the natural geographical location of the municipality. The wedge in the shield's top is intended to indicate the back of a long extended ridge. The ridge forms an important watershed between Stör and Elbe and the former catchment area of the Eider, which is now formed by the Kiel Canal, symbolized by the interrupted wavy thread in the shield base. The name Aasbüttel derives from Asch (ash) and Büttel (settlement) and can be translated as "settlement near ash trees." The ash leaf is intended to symbolize the interpretation of the name.

== Economy and Transport ==
The main economic factor in the community today is its function as a commuter town. The general agricultural structural change has only allowed a few farms to survive. There is a production of Christmas trees.

The district road 60 of the Steinburg district runs through the municipal area. It branches off from the Schleswig-Holstein state road 127 in Warringholz. South of Aasbüttel, the route of the Bundesautobahn 23 (also known as the West Coast Autobahn) between Itzehoe and Heide runs through the municipal areas of Agethorst and Bokelrehm.

== Notable people ==
- Claus Göttsche (1899–1945), Head of the Jewish Affairs Office of the Hamburg Gestapo.
- Hans-Richard Hirschfeld (1900–1988), Ambassador.
- Friedrich von Passow (1865–1929), Lieutenant General in the Reichswehr.
