= Siezbüttel =

- Ortsteil of Schenefeld
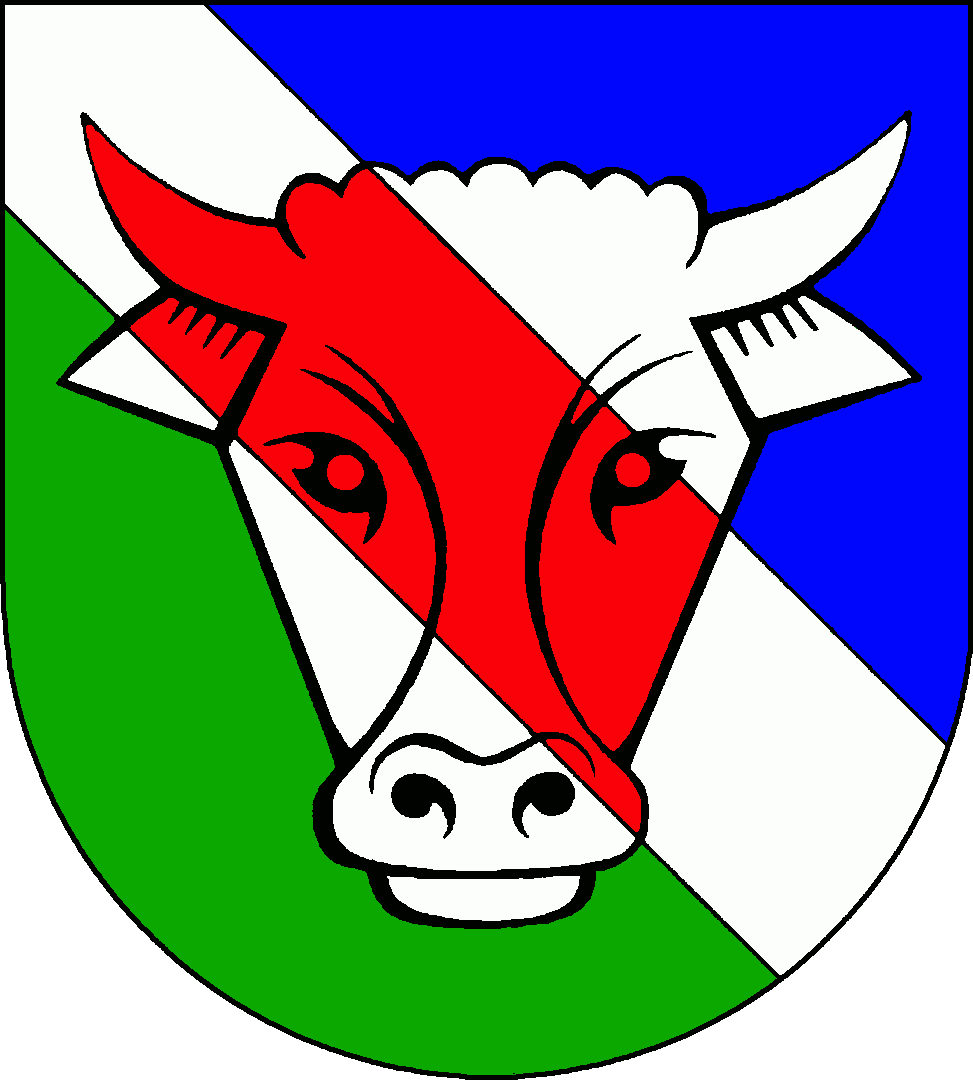
- Coat of arms
- Interactive map of Siezbüttel
- Location within Germany Location within Schleswig-Holstein
- Coordinates: 54°2′N 9°27′E
- Country: Germany
- State: Schleswig-Holstein
- District: Steinburg
- Municipality: Schenefeld

Area
  - Total: 4.08 km^{2} (1.58 sq mi)
- Elevation: 20 m (66 ft)

Population (2011-12-31)
  - Total: 60
  - Density: 15/km^{2} (38/sq mi)
- Time zone: UTC+01:00 (CET)
  - Summer (DST): UTC+02:00 (CEST)
- Postal codes: 25560
- Dialling codes: 04892
- Vehicle registration: IZ
- Website: www.amt-schenefeld.de

Siezbüttel is a village and a former municipality in the district of Steinburg, in Schleswig-Holstein, Germany. Since 1 January 2013, it is part of the municipality Schenefeld.
