= Schenefeld =

Schenefeld may refer to two municipalities in Schleswig-Holstein, Germany:

- Schenefeld, Pinneberg
- Schenefeld, Steinburg
