= Landrecht =

Landrecht (German language) means "law of the land", "state law", "land law" or "state jurisdiction". Specifically it may refer to the following:

Various laws:

- Landrecht, one of the two parts of the ancient Saxon Sachsenspiegel legal code, the other being Lehnsrecht
- Landrecht (medieval), the law of a state of the Holy Roman Empire in medieval and early modern times
- Bohemian Landrecht, until 1621 the highest court in the Kingdom of Bohemia
- Landrecht (Sweden), Sweden's first collection of laws that applied to the whole empire
- Allgemeines Landrecht für die Preußischen Staaten or "General state laws for the Prussian states"

Place(s):

- Landrecht (Steinburg), a parish in the district of Steinburg in Schleswig-Holstein, Germany

== See also ==
- Landfriede
- Ewiger Landfriede
- Landgericht (medieval)
