= Nortorf (disambiguation) =

Nortorf is a town in the district of Rendsburg-Eckernförde, in Schleswig-Holstein, Germany.

Nortorf may also refer to:

- Nortorf, Steinburg, is a municipality in the district of Steinburg, in Schleswig-Holstein, Germany
- Schülp bei Nortorf, a municipality in the district of Rendsburg-Eckernförde, in Schleswig-Holstein, Germany
