= Rethwisch =

Rethwisch or Rehtwisch may refer to:

== Places ==
- Rethwisch, Stormarn, a municipality in the Stormarn district, Schleswig-Holstein
- Rethwisch, Steinburg, a municipality in Steinburg district, Schleswig-Holstein
- Rethwisch, a village in the municipality of Börgerende-Rethwisch in Rostock district, Mecklenburg-Western Pomerania
- Rethwisch, a village in the municipality of Lehmkuhlen in Plön district, Schleswig-Holstein
- Rethwisch, part of the municipality of Möllenhagen in Mecklenburgische Seenplatte district, Mecklenburg-Western Pomerania
- Rethwisch, part of the municipality of Schönwalde am Bungsberg, Schleswig-Holstein

== People ==
- Conrad Rethwisch (1845–1921), German teacher and historian
- Ernst Rethwisch (actor) (1824–1879), German actor
- Ernst Rethwisch (journalist) (1852–1913), German journalist and author
- Haymo Rethwisch (born 1938), German businessman and benefactor
- Karl Rethwisch (1839–1909), German recitor and Low German poet
- Theodor Rethwisch (Karl Anton Theodor Rethwisch; 1824–1904), German tax official and regional poet
- Theodor Rehtwisch (1864–1912), German author
