= Landscheide =

- Municipality
- Coat of arms

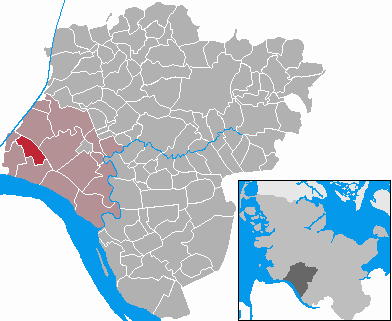
- Location of Landscheide within Steinburg district
- Interactive map of Landscheide
- Location within Germany Location within Schleswig-Holstein
- Coordinates: 53°55′N 9°16′E
- Country: Germany
- State: Schleswig-Holstein
- District: Steinburg
- Municipal assoc.: Wilstermarsch

Government
  - Mayor: Uwe Lameyer

Area
  - Total: 7.44 km^{2} (2.87 sq mi)
- Elevation: 6 m (20 ft)

Population (2025-12-31)
  - Total: 249
  - Density: 33.5/km^{2} (86.7/sq mi)
- Time zone: UTC+01:00 (CET)
  - Summer (DST): UTC+02:00 (CEST)
- Postal codes: 25572
- Dialling codes: 04858
- Vehicle registration: IZ
- Website: www.wilstermarsch.de

Landscheide is a municipality in the district of Steinburg, in Schleswig-Holstein, Germany.
