= Vaale =

- Municipality
- Coat of arms

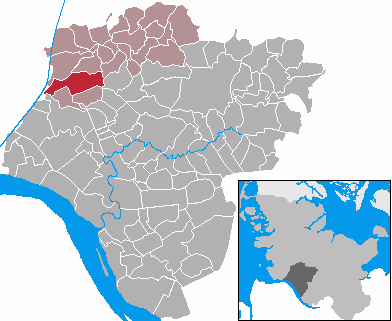
- Location of Vaale within Steinburg district
- Interactive map of Vaale
- Location within Germany Location within Schleswig-Holstein
- Coordinates: 54°00′N 9°23′E
- Country: Germany
- State: Schleswig-Holstein
- District: Steinburg
- Municipal assoc.: Schenefeld

Government
  - Mayor: Thomas Hencke

Area
  - Total: 14.91 km^{2} (5.76 sq mi)
- Elevation: 13 m (43 ft)

Population (2025-12-31)
  - Total: 1,233
  - Density: 82.70/km^{2} (214.2/sq mi)
- Time zone: UTC+01:00 (CET)
  - Summer (DST): UTC+02:00 (CEST)
- Postal codes: 25594
- Dialling codes: 04827
- Vehicle registration: IZ
- Website: www.amt-schenefeld.de

Vaale (German pronunciation: [ˈfaːlə]) is a municipality in the district of Steinburg, in Schleswig-Holstein, Germany.

== Sports ==
The town has a football team, SV Vaalia Vaale, who play in the Kreisklasse A Westküste West. They were in 10th when the 2020–21 season was cancelled. SV Vaalia Vaale II play in the Kreisklasse C Westküste Süd/West 3, in 8th before the cancellation of the season.
