= Heiligenstedtenerkamp =

- Municipality
- Coat of arms

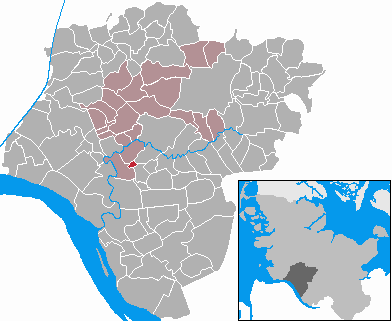
- Location of Heiligenstedtenerkamp within Steinburg district
- Interactive map of Heiligenstedtenerkamp
- Location within Germany Location within Schleswig-Holstein
- Coordinates: 53°54′N 9°28′E
- Country: Germany
- State: Schleswig-Holstein
- District: Steinburg
- Municipal assoc.: Itzehoe-Land

Government
  - Mayor: Otto Tönsing (SPD)

Area
  - Total: 0.85 km^{2} (0.33 sq mi)
- Elevation: 6 m (20 ft)

Population (2025-12-31)
  - Total: 689
  - Density: 810/km^{2} (2,100/sq mi)
- Time zone: UTC+01:00 (CET)
  - Summer (DST): UTC+02:00 (CEST)
- Postal codes: 25524
- Dialling codes: 04821
- Vehicle registration: IZ
- Website: www.amtitzehoe- land.de

Heiligenstedtenerkamp is amunicipality in the district of Steinburg in Schleswig-Holstein, Germany. With 21 letters, it holds the record for the longest name among German municipalities composed solely of letters. Additionally, the municipality ranks eleventh in the list of smallest area municipalities in Germany. Compared to other municipalities in the Steinburg district, Heiligenstedtenerkamp has a high population density, comparable to that of major cities and urban areas. The nearby town of Itzehoe shares a similar population density.

== Geography and Transport ==
Heiligenstedtenerkamp is situated directly southwest of Itzehoe. To the east of the municipality lies the Wellenkamp district of Itzehoe, while Kremperheide is to the south, Hodorf to the west, and Heiligenstedten to the northwest. The city center of Itzehoe is accessible by bus within 15 to 20 minutes.

The Bundesautobahn 23 and Bundesstraße 5 are within a 5 km radius of the municipality.

== History ==
First mentioned in records around 1300, Heiligenstedtenerkamp was officially established as a municipality around 1660. At that time, residents were individuals who worked at the nearby Heiligenstedten Castle, hence the designation "Kamp."

In 1812, a primary school was founded, which was later replaced by the "Grundschule Wellenkamp" in 1972. Since 1987, much of the building has been used as a kindergarten.

== Politics ==
=== Municipal Council ===
In the municipal election on May 14, 2023, a total of nine seats were allocated. The Heiligenstedtenerkamp Voters' Association won six seats, while the SPD secured three seats.

== Coat of Arms ==
Blazon: "Quartered in gold and green: 1. a green hut, 2. a gold pickaxe pointing downwards, 3. a gold spade, 4. a green wheel."

The colors gold and green symbolize the sand and land in Heiligenstedtenerkamp. The hut signifies the earlier inhabitants known as 'Kätners' who mainly served the Heiligenstedten Castle. The depicted tools represent sand extraction, labor services, and vegetable cultivation.

== Sport ==
The local sports club is SV Heiligenstedtenerkamp. The main sport practiced is football, along with other sports.
