= Bekmünde =

- Municipality
- Coat of arms

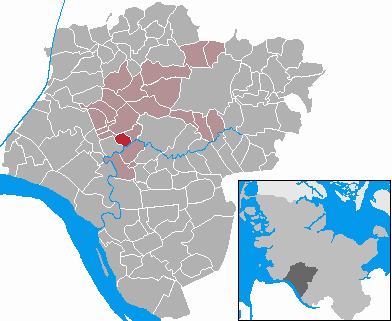
- Location of Bekmünde within Steinburg district
- Interactive map of Bekmünde
- Location within Germany Location within Schleswig-Holstein
- Coordinates: 53°55′N 9°26′E
- Country: Germany
- State: Schleswig-Holstein
- District: Steinburg
- Municipal assoc.: Itzehoe-Land

Government
  - Mayor: Klaus Krüger

Area
  - Total: 2.9 km^{2} (1.1 sq mi)
- Elevation: 2 m (6.6 ft)

Population (2025-12-31)
  - Total: 154
  - Density: 53/km^{2} (140/sq mi)
- Time zone: UTC+01:00 (CET)
  - Summer (DST): UTC+02:00 (CEST)
- Postal codes: 25524
- Dialling codes: 04821, 04823
- Vehicle registration: IZ
- Website: www.amtitzehoe- land.de

Bekmünde is a municipality in the district of Steinburg, in Schleswig-Holstein, Germany. It is around 5 km west of Itzehoe and around 50 km northwest of Hamburg.
