= Gribbohm =

- Municipality
- Coat of arms

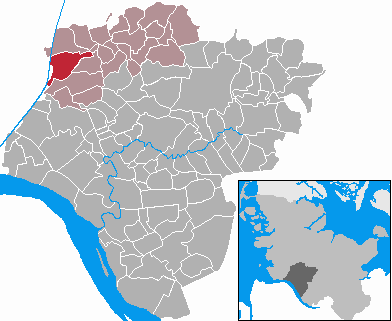
- Location of Gribbohm within Steinburg district
- Interactive map of Gribbohm
- Location within Germany Location within Schleswig-Holstein
- Coordinates: 54°1′35″N 9°21′4″E
- Country: Germany
- State: Schleswig-Holstein
- District: Steinburg
- Municipal assoc.: Schenefeld

Government
  - Mayor: Gerd Saß

Area
  - Total: 13.23 km^{2} (5.11 sq mi)
- Elevation: 10 m (33 ft)

Population (2025-12-31)
  - Total: 385
  - Density: 29.1/km^{2} (75.4/sq mi)
- Time zone: UTC+01:00 (CET)
  - Summer (DST): UTC+02:00 (CEST)
- Postal codes: 25596
- Dialling codes: 04827
- Vehicle registration: IZ

Gribbohm is a municipality in the district of Steinburg, in Schleswig-Holstein, Germany.
