= Bokhorst =

- Municipality
- Coat of arms

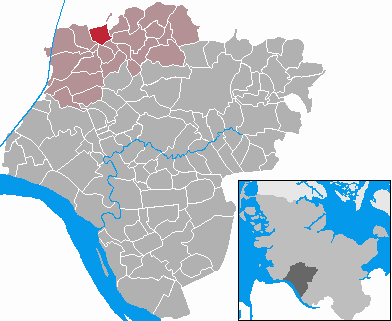
- Location of Bokhorst within Steinburg district
- Interactive map of Bokhorst
- Location within Germany Location within Schleswig-Holstein
- Coordinates: 54°4′N 9°24′E
- Country: Germany
- State: Schleswig-Holstein
- District: Steinburg
- Municipal assoc.: Schenefeld

Government
  - Mayor: Sigrun Menge

Area
  - Total: 5.87 km^{2} (2.27 sq mi)
- Elevation: 44 m (144 ft)

Population (2025-12-31)
  - Total: 135
  - Density: 23.0/km^{2} (59.6/sq mi)
- Time zone: UTC+01:00 (CET)
  - Summer (DST): UTC+02:00 (CEST)
- Postal codes: 25560
- Dialling codes: 04892
- Vehicle registration: IZ

Bokhorst is a municipality in the district of Steinburg, in Schleswig-Holstein, Germany.
