= Looft =

- Municipality
- Coat of arms

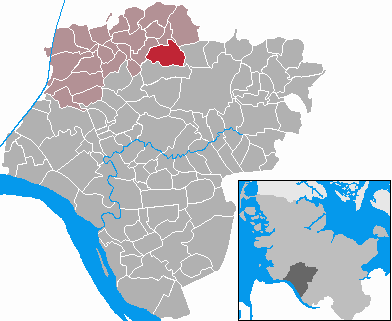
- Location of Looft within Steinburg district
- Interactive map of Looft
- Location within Germany Location within Schleswig-Holstein
- Coordinates: 54°1′43″N 9°31′23″E
- Country: Germany
- State: Schleswig-Holstein
- District: Steinburg
- Municipal assoc.: Schenefeld

Government
  - Mayor: Hans-Hermann Hollm

Area
  - Total: 12.43 km^{2} (4.80 sq mi)
- Elevation: 14 m (46 ft)

Population (2025-12-31)
  - Total: 376
  - Density: 30.2/km^{2} (78.3/sq mi)
- Time zone: UTC+01:00 (CET)
  - Summer (DST): UTC+02:00 (CEST)
- Postal codes: 25582
- Dialling codes: 04892
- Vehicle registration: IZ

Looft is a municipality in the district of Steinburg, in Schleswig-Holstein, Germany.
