= Krempermarsch =

Amt in Steinburg County, Germany

- Amt
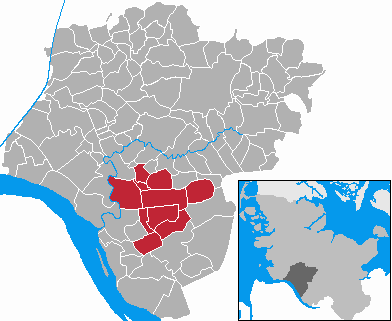
- Map of Steinburg highlighting Krempermarsch
- Interactive map of Krempermarsch
- Location within Germany Location within Schleswig-Holstein
- Coordinates: 53°50′N 9°30′E
- Country: Germany
- State: Schleswig-Holstein
- District: Steinburg
- Seat: Krempe
- Subdivisions: 10 municipalities

Area
  - Total: 81.2 km^{2} (31.4 sq mi)

Population (2025-12-31)
  - Total: 9,451
  - Density: 116/km^{2} (301/sq mi)
- Time zone: UTC+01:00 (CET)
  - Summer (DST): UTC+02:00 (CEST)
- Website: www.amt-krempermarsch.de

Krempermarsch is an Amt ("collective municipality") in the district of Steinburg, in Schleswig-Holstein, Germany. It is situated between Itzehoe and Glückstadt. The seat of the Amt is in the town Krempe.

The Amt Krempermarsch consists of the following municipalities:

- Bahrenfleth
- Dägeling
- Elskop
- Grevenkop
- Krempe
- Kremperheide
- Krempermoor
- Neuenbrook
- Rethwisch
- Süderau
