= Süderau =

- Municipality
- Coat of arms

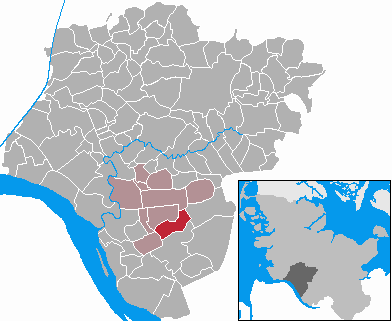
- Location of Süderau within Steinburg district
- Interactive map of Süderau
- Location within Germany Location within Schleswig-Holstein
- Coordinates: 53°49′N 9°31′E
- Country: Germany
- State: Schleswig-Holstein
- District: Steinburg
- Municipal assoc.: Krempermarsch

Government
  - Mayor: Peter Wischmann

Area
  - Total: 8.86 km^{2} (3.42 sq mi)
- Elevation: 3 m (9.8 ft)

Population (2025-12-31)
  - Total: 739
  - Density: 83.4/km^{2} (216/sq mi)
- Time zone: UTC+01:00 (CET)
  - Summer (DST): UTC+02:00 (CEST)
- Postal codes: 25361
- Dialling codes: 04824
- Vehicle registration: IZ
- Website: www.amt- krempermarsch.de

Süderau is a municipality in the district of Steinburg, in Schleswig-Holstein, Germany.
