= Moorhusen =

- Municipality
- Coat of arms

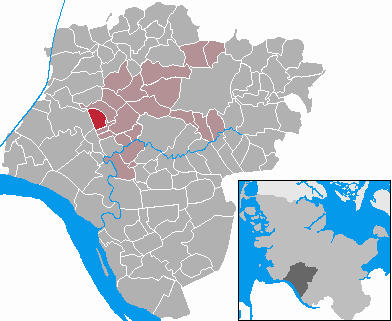
- Location of Moorhusen within Steinburg district
- Interactive map of Moorhusen
- Location within Germany Location within Schleswig-Holstein
- Coordinates: 53°58′N 9°23′E
- Country: Germany
- State: Schleswig-Holstein
- District: Steinburg
- Municipal assoc.: Itzehoe-Land

Government
  - Mayor: Holger Dunker

Area
  - Total: 4.68 km^{2} (1.81 sq mi)
- Elevation: 1 m (3.3 ft)

Population (2025-12-31)
  - Total: 73
  - Density: 16/km^{2} (40/sq mi)
- Time zone: UTC+01:00 (CET)
  - Summer (DST): UTC+02:00 (CEST)
- Postal codes: 25554
- Dialling codes: 04823
- Vehicle registration: IZ
- Website: www.amtitzehoe- land.de

Moorhusen is a municipality in the district of Steinburg, in Schleswig-Holstein, Germany.
