= Schenefeld (Amt) =

Municipality in Schleswig-Holstein, Germany

- Amt
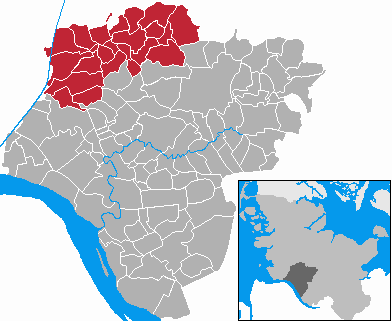
- Map of Steinburg highlighting Schenefeld
- Interactive map of Schenefeld
- Location within Germany Location within Schleswig-Holstein
- Coordinates: 54°03′N 9°29′E
- Country: Germany
- State: Schleswig-Holstein
- District: Steinburg
- Seat: Schenefeld
- Subdivisions: 22 municipalities

Area
  - Total: 164.38 km^{2} (63.47 sq mi)

Population (2025-12-31)
  - Total: 10,970
  - Density: 66.74/km^{2} (172.8/sq mi)
- Time zone: UTC+01:00 (CET)
  - Summer (DST): UTC+02:00 (CEST)
- Website: www.amt-schenefeld.de

Schenefeld is an Amt ("collective municipality") in the district of Steinburg, in Schleswig-Holstein, Germany. The seat of the Amt is in Schenefeld.

The Amt Schenefeld consists of the following municipalities:

1. Aasbüttel
2. Agethorst
3. Besdorf
4. Bokelrehm
5. Bokhorst
6. Christinenthal
7. Gribbohm
8. Hadenfeld
9. Holstenniendorf
10. Kaisborstel
11. Looft
12. Nienbüttel
13. Nutteln
14. Oldenborstel
15. Pöschendorf
16. Puls
17. Reher
18. Schenefeld
19. Vaale
20. Vaalermoor
21. Wacken
22. Warringholz
