= Auufer =

- Municipality
- Coat of arms

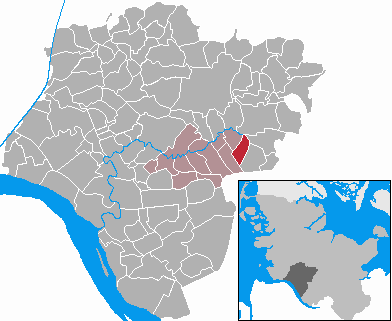
- Location of Auufer within Steinburg district
- Interactive map of Auufer
- Location within Germany Location within Schleswig-Holstein
- Coordinates: 53°55′N 9°40′E
- Country: Germany
- State: Schleswig-Holstein
- District: Steinburg
- Municipal assoc.: Breitenburg

Government
  - Mayor: Fritz Körner

Area
  - Total: 5.12 km^{2} (1.98 sq mi)
- Elevation: 1 m (3.3 ft)

Population (2025-12-31)
  - Total: 130
  - Density: 25/km^{2} (66/sq mi)
- Time zone: UTC+01:00 (CET)
  - Summer (DST): UTC+02:00 (CEST)
- Postal codes: 25548
- Dialling codes: 04822
- Vehicle registration: IZ
- Website: www.amt- breitenburg.de

Auufer is a municipality in the district of Steinburg, in Schleswig-Holstein, Germany.
