= Oldenborstel =

- Municipality
- Coat of arms

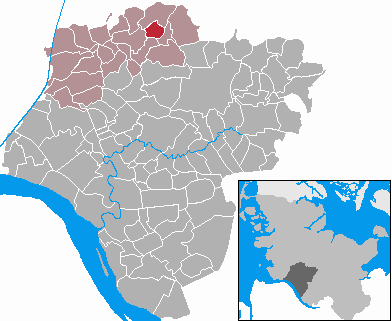
- Location of Oldenborstel within Steinburg district
- Interactive map of Oldenborstel
- Location within Germany Location within Schleswig-Holstein
- Coordinates: 54°4′N 9°31′E
- Country: Germany
- State: Schleswig-Holstein
- District: Steinburg
- Municipal assoc.: Schenefeld

Government
  - Mayor: Jens Löding

Area
  - Total: 4.24 km^{2} (1.64 sq mi)
- Elevation: 18 m (59 ft)

Population (2025-12-31)
  - Total: 100
  - Density: 24/km^{2} (61/sq mi)
- Time zone: UTC+01:00 (CET)
  - Summer (DST): UTC+02:00 (CEST)
- Postal codes: 25560
- Dialling codes: 04892
- Vehicle registration: IZ

Oldenborstel is a municipality in the district of Steinburg, in Schleswig-Holstein, Germany.
