= Krempe =

- Town
- Coat of arms

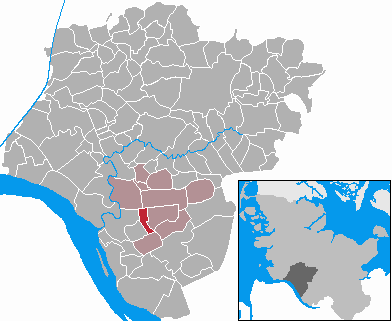
- Location of Krempe within Steinburg district
- Interactive map of Krempe
- Location within Germany Location within Schleswig-Holstein
- Coordinates: 53°49′N 9°28′E
- Country: Germany
- State: Schleswig-Holstein
- District: Steinburg
- Municipal assoc.: Krempermarsch

Government
  - Mayor: Volker Haack
  - Governing parties: CDU

Area
  - Total: 3.39 km^{2} (1.31 sq mi)
- Elevation: 6 m (20 ft)

Population (2025-12-31)
  - Total: 2,421
  - Density: 714/km^{2} (1,850/sq mi)
- Time zone: UTC+01:00 (CET)
  - Summer (DST): UTC+02:00 (CEST)
- Postal codes: 25361, 25359
- Dialling codes: 04824
- Vehicle registration: IZ
- Website: www.krempe.de

Krempe (German pronunciation: [ˈkʁɛmpə]; Low German: Kremp) is a town in the district of Steinburg, in Schleswig-Holstein, Germany. It is situated between Itzehoe and Glückstadt. Krempe is part of the Amt ("collective municipality") Krempermarsch.

== Partner towns ==
- (Austria) Sankt Martin im Sulmtal in der Steiermark
- (Germany) Gramzow in der Uckermark, Brandenburg
