= Ecklak =

- Municipality
- Coat of arms

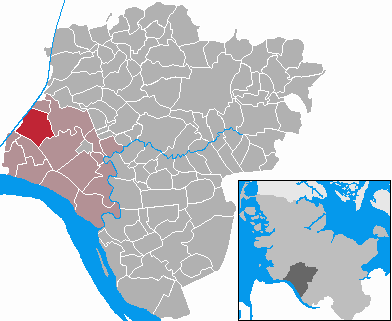
- Location of Ecklak within Steinburg district
- Interactive map of Ecklak
- Location within Germany Location within Schleswig-Holstein
- Coordinates: 53°57′N 9°16′E
- Country: Germany
- State: Schleswig-Holstein
- District: Steinburg
- Municipal assoc.: Wilstermarsch

Government
  - Mayor: Heino Evers

Area
  - Total: 15.59 km^{2} (6.02 sq mi)
- Elevation: 1 m (3.3 ft)

Population (2025-12-31)
  - Total: 287
  - Density: 18.4/km^{2} (47.7/sq mi)
- Time zone: UTC+01:00 (CET)
  - Summer (DST): UTC+02:00 (CEST)
- Postal codes: 25572
- Dialling codes: 04823, 04825, 04858
- Vehicle registration: IZ
- Website: www.wilstermarsch.de

Ecklak is a municipality in the district of Steinburg, in Schleswig-Holstein, Germany.

Ecklak is located on the periphery of the Wilstermarsch and Kudenseemoor, about ten kilometers northeast of Brunsbüttel and 14 kilometers west of Itzehoe on the Kiel Canal. The federal highway 5 and the railway line from Itzehoe to Brunsbüttel run a few kilometers south of Ecklak. The river of Wilsterau flows through the municipality of Ecklak.
