= Vaalermoor =

- Municipality
- Coat of arms

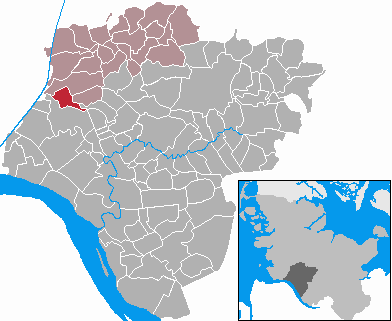
- Location of Vaalermoor within Steinburg district
- Interactive map of Vaalermoor
- Location within Germany Location within Schleswig-Holstein
- Coordinates: 53°58′25″N 9°19′55″E
- Country: Germany
- State: Schleswig-Holstein
- District: Steinburg
- Municipal assoc.: Schenefeld

Government
  - Mayor: Arno Bolle

Area
  - Total: 6.22 km^{2} (2.40 sq mi)
- Elevation: 2 m (6.6 ft)

Population (2025-12-31)
  - Total: 121
  - Density: 19.5/km^{2} (50.4/sq mi)
- Time zone: UTC+01:00 (CET)
  - Summer (DST): UTC+02:00 (CEST)
- Postal codes: 25594
- Dialling codes: 04823
- Vehicle registration: IZ
- Website: www.amt-schenefeld.de

Vaalermoor is a municipality in the district of Steinburg, in Schleswig-Holstein, Germany.
