= Wittenbergen =

- Municipality
- Coat of arms

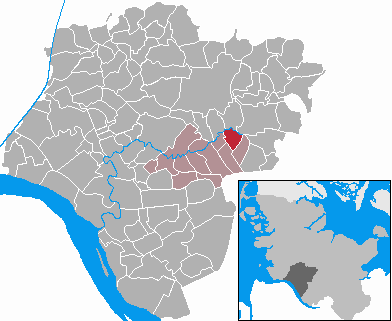
- Location of Wittenbergen within Steinburg district
- Interactive map of Wittenbergen
- Location within Germany Location within Schleswig-Holstein
- Coordinates: 53°56′N 9°40′E
- Country: Germany
- State: Schleswig-Holstein
- District: Steinburg
- Municipal assoc.: Breitenburg

Government
  - Mayor: Gerd Dammann

Area
  - Total: 4.59 km^{2} (1.77 sq mi)
- Elevation: 2 m (6.6 ft)

Population (2025-12-31)
  - Total: 184
  - Density: 40.1/km^{2} (104/sq mi)
- Time zone: UTC+01:00 (CET)
  - Summer (DST): UTC+02:00 (CEST)
- Postal codes: 25548
- Dialling codes: 04822
- Vehicle registration: IZ
- Website: www.amt- breitenburg.de

Wittenbergen is a municipality in the district of Steinburg, in Schleswig-Holstein, Germany.

It is a part of collective municipality Breitenburg (Amt)
