= Besdorf =

- Municipality
- Coat of arms

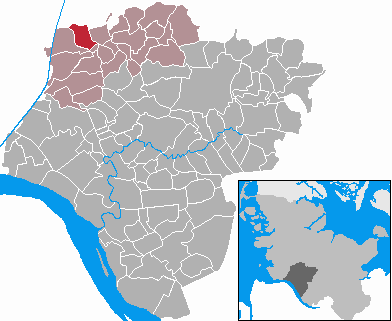
- Location of Besdorf within Steinburg district
- Interactive map of Besdorf
- Location within Germany Location within Schleswig-Holstein
- Coordinates: 54°3′N 9°22′E
- Country: Germany
- State: Schleswig-Holstein
- District: Steinburg
- Municipal assoc.: Schenefeld

Government
  - Mayor: Kay Wieck

Area
  - Total: 7.37 km^{2} (2.85 sq mi)
- Elevation: 13 m (43 ft)

Population (2025-12-31)
  - Total: 223
  - Density: 30.3/km^{2} (78.4/sq mi)
- Time zone: UTC+01:00 (CET)
  - Summer (DST): UTC+02:00 (CEST)
- Postal codes: 25584
- Dialling codes: 04827
- Vehicle registration: IZ

Besdorf is a municipality in the district of Steinburg, in Schleswig-Holstein, Germany.
