= Dägeling =

- Municipality
- Coat of arms

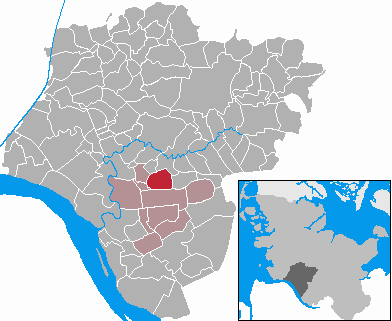
- Location of Dägeling within Steinburg district
- Interactive map of Dägeling
- Location within Germany Location within Schleswig-Holstein
- Coordinates: 53°52′49″N 9°31′45″E
- Country: Germany
- State: Schleswig-Holstein
- District: Steinburg
- Municipal assoc.: Krempermarsch

Government
  - Mayor: Claus Wilke (CDU)

Area
  - Total: 7.53 km^{2} (2.91 sq mi)
- Elevation: 20 m (66 ft)

Population (2025-12-31)
  - Total: 1,049
  - Density: 139/km^{2} (361/sq mi)
- Time zone: UTC+01:00 (CET)
  - Summer (DST): UTC+02:00 (CEST)
- Postal codes: 25578
- Dialling codes: 04821
- Vehicle registration: IZ
- Website: www.daegeling.de

Dägeling is a municipality in the district of Steinburg, in Schleswig-Holstein, Germany.

== History ==
The village was first mentioned in a document in 1427 as Dodelinghe. It was owned by Bordesholm Monastery, from which Johann Rantzau bought it in 1526.

From 1890 to 1938 the village belonged to the district of Lägerdorf, and from 1938 to 1969 to the district of Neuenbrook. Starting 1948, it was administratively managed by the office of Neuenbrook. Since 1969 it has belonged to the Krempermarsch district.
