= Wilstermarsch =

Administrative division in Schleswig-Holstein, Germany

- Amt
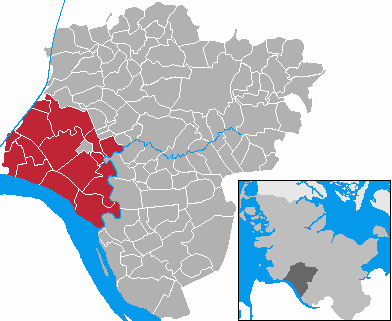
- Map of Steinburg highlighting Wilstermarsch
- Interactive map of Wilstermarsch
- Location within Germany Location within Schleswig-Holstein
- Coordinates: 53°55′21″N 9°22′28″E
- Country: Germany
- State: Schleswig-Holstein
- District: Steinburg
- Seat: Wilster
- Subdivisions: 14 municipalities

Area
  - Total: 178.06 km^{2} (68.75 sq mi)

Population (2025-12-31)
  - Total: 6,438
  - Density: 36.16/km^{2} (93.64/sq mi)
- Time zone: UTC+01:00 (CET)
  - Summer (DST): UTC+02:00 (CEST)
- Website: www.wilster.de

Wilstermarsch is an Amt ("collective municipality") in the district of Steinburg, in Schleswig-Holstein, Germany. It is situated around Wilster, which is the seat of the Amt, but not part of it.

It contains the lowest point in Germany, 3.5 meters below sea level.

The Amt Wilstermarsch consists of the following municipalities:

1. Aebtissinwisch
2. Beidenfleth
3. Brokdorf
4. Büttel
5. Dammfleth
6. Ecklak
7. Kudensee
8. Landrecht
9. Landscheide
10. Neuendorf-Sachsenbande
11. Nortorf
12. Sankt Margarethen
13. Stördorf
14. Wewelsfleth
