= Oldendorf, Schleswig-Holstein =

Oldendorf
- Municipality
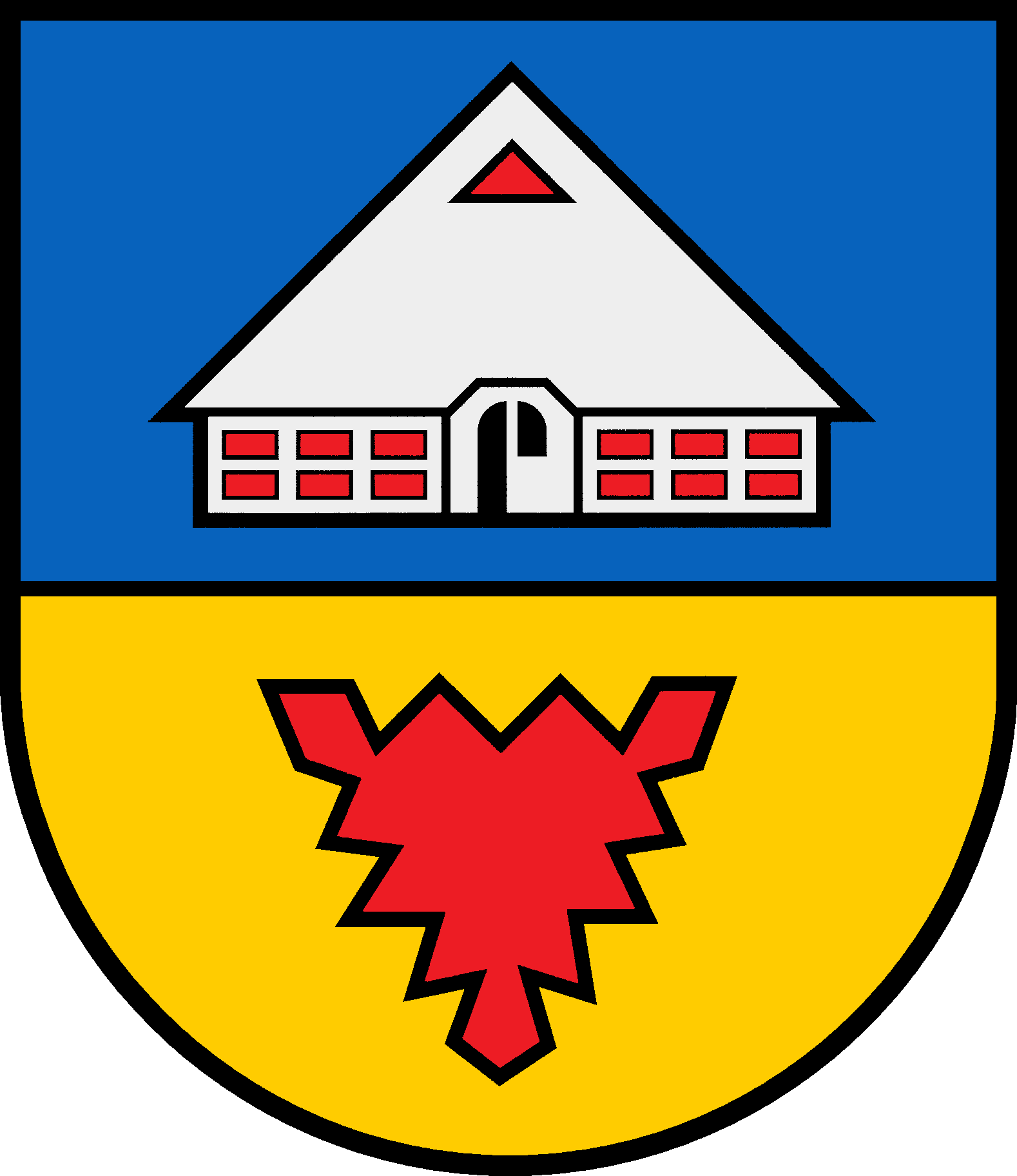
- Coat of arms

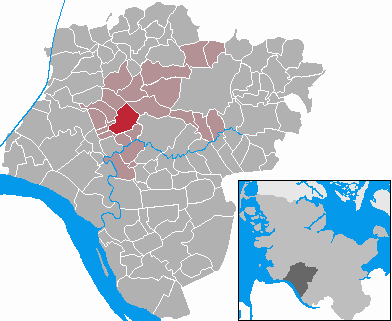
- Location of Oldendorf within Steinburg district
- Interactive map of Oldendorf
- Location within Germany Location within Schleswig-Holstein
- Coordinates: 53°57′N 9°26′E
- Country: Germany
- State: Schleswig-Holstein
- District: Steinburg
- Municipal assoc.: Itzehoe-Land

Government
  - Mayor: Hans Nonnenbroich

Area
  - Total: 10.35 km^{2} (4.00 sq mi)
- Elevation: 11 m (36 ft)

Population (2025-12-31)
  - Total: 1,067
  - Density: 103.1/km^{2} (267.0/sq mi)
- Time zone: UTC+01:00 (CET)
  - Summer (DST): UTC+02:00 (CEST)
- Postal codes: 25588
- Dialling codes: 04821
- Vehicle registration: IZ
- Website: www.amtitzehoe- land.de

Oldendorf (German pronunciation: [ˈɔldn̩dɔʁf]) is a municipality in the district of Steinburg, in Schleswig-Holstein, Germany.
