= Elskop =

- Municipality
- Coat of arms

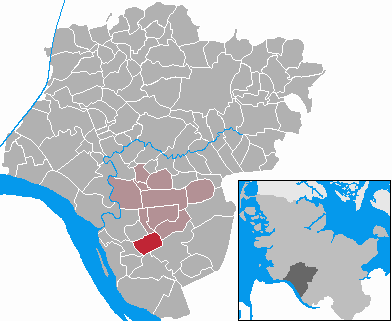
- Location of Elskop within Steinburg district
- Interactive map of Elskop
- Location within Germany Location within Schleswig-Holstein
- Coordinates: 53°49′N 9°28′E
- Country: Germany
- State: Schleswig-Holstein
- District: Steinburg
- Municipal assoc.: Krempermarsch

Government
  - Mayor: Jochen Töllner

Area
  - Total: 7.34 km^{2} (2.83 sq mi)
- Elevation: 3 m (9.8 ft)

Population (2025-12-31)
  - Total: 161
  - Density: 21.9/km^{2} (56.8/sq mi)
- Time zone: UTC+01:00 (CET)
  - Summer (DST): UTC+02:00 (CEST)
- Postal codes: 25361
- Dialling codes: 04124, 04824
- Vehicle registration: IZ
- Website: www.amt- krempermarsch.de

Elskop is a municipality in the district of Steinburg, in Schleswig-Holstein, Germany.
