= Neuendorf-Sachsenbande =

- Municipality
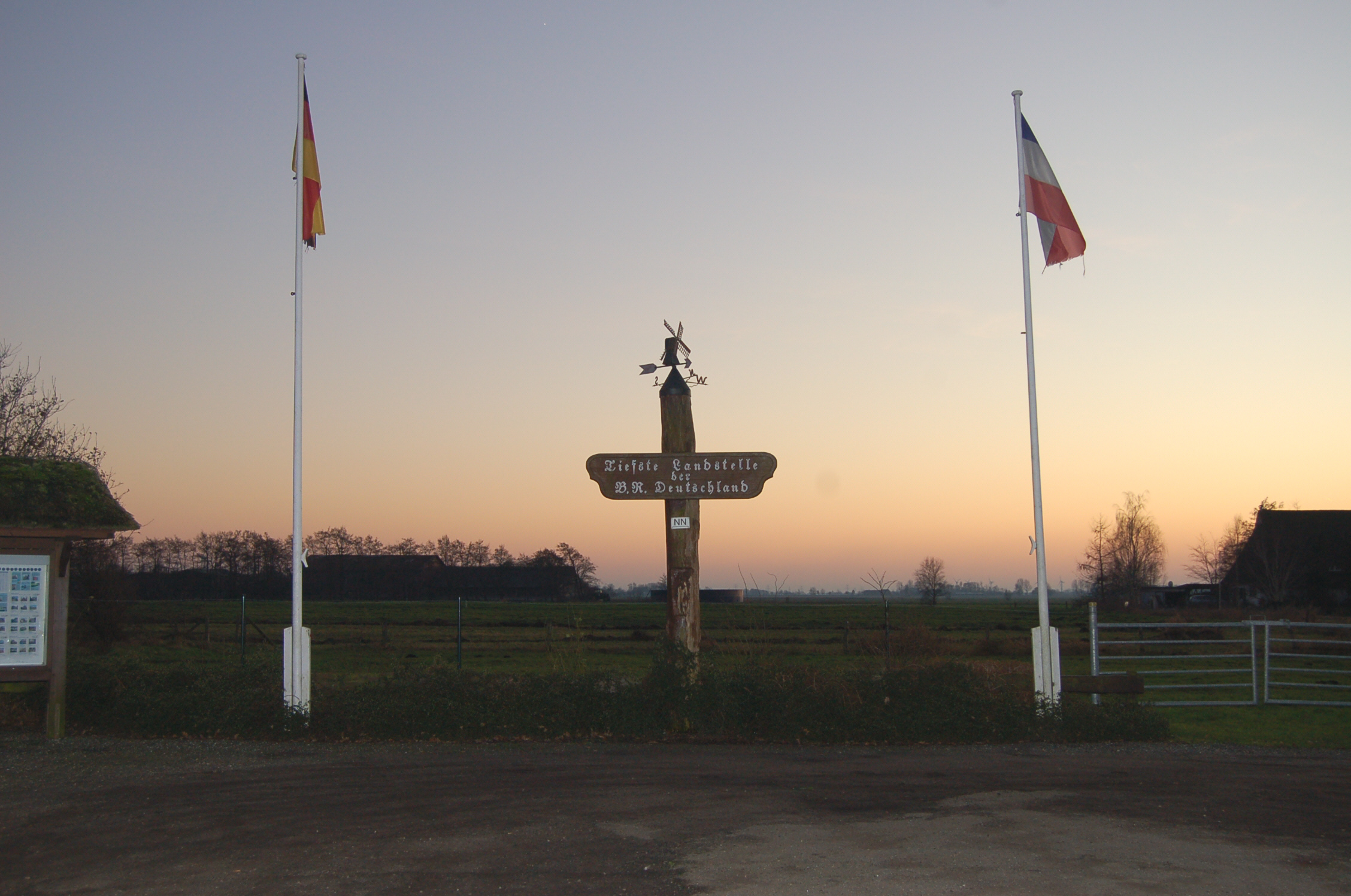
- The lowest point in Germany. The small black line at the bottom of the placard marked "NN" (Normalnull) is sea level.

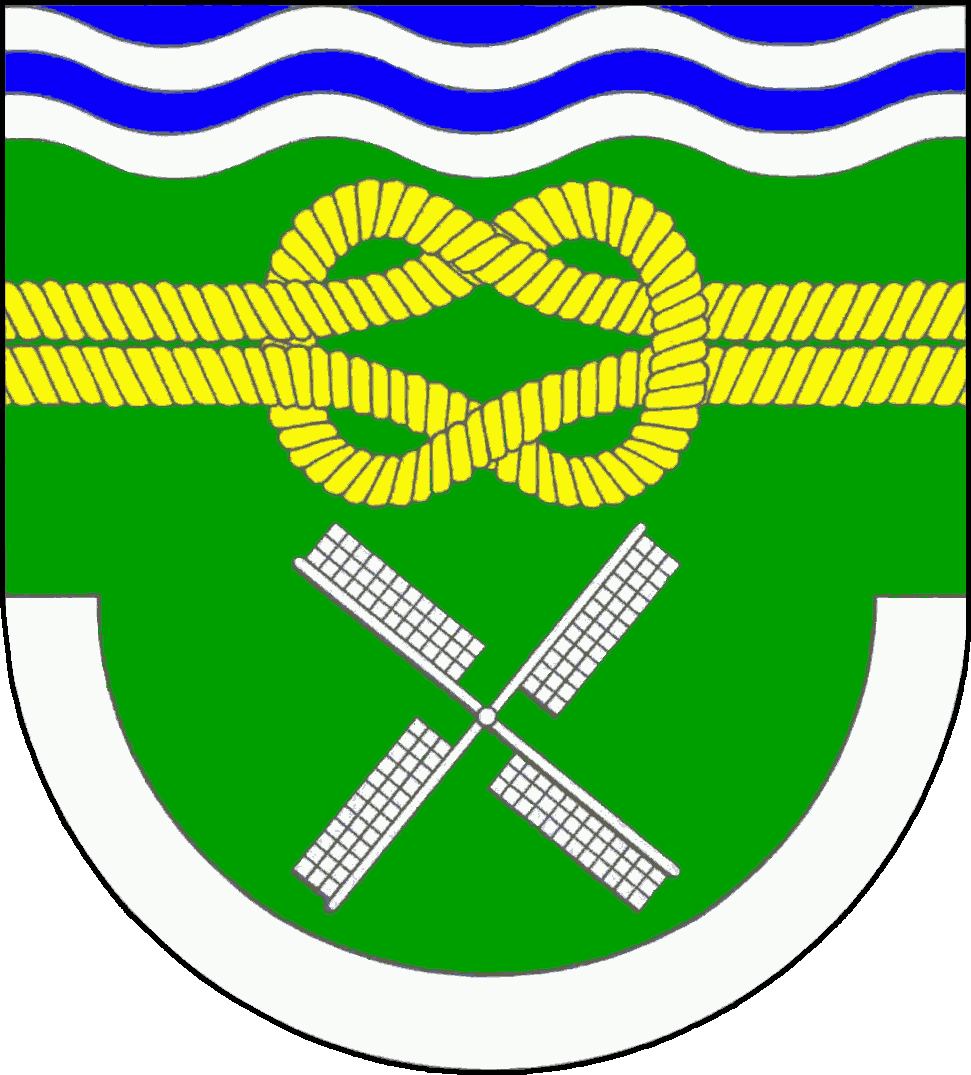
- Coat of arms

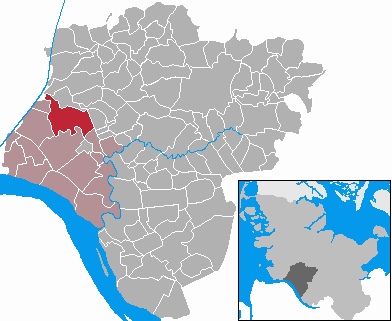
- Location of Neuendorf-Sachsenbande within Steinburg district
- Interactive map of Neuendorf-Sachsenbande
- Location within Germany Location within Schleswig-Holstein
- Coordinates: 53°57′45″N 09°20′00″E
- Country: Germany
- State: Schleswig-Holstein
- District: Steinburg
- Municipal assoc.: Wilstermarsch

Government
  - Mayor: Jens Tiedemann

Area
  - Total: 19.3 km^{2} (7.5 sq mi)
- Elevation: 5 m (16 ft)

Population (2025-12-31)
  - Total: 409
  - Density: 21.2/km^{2} (54.9/sq mi)
- Time zone: UTC+01:00 (CET)
  - Summer (DST): UTC+02:00 (CEST)
- Postal codes: 25554
- Dialling codes: 04823
- Vehicle registration: IZ
- Website: wilstermarsch.de

Neuendorf-Sachsenbande (German pronunciation: [ˈnɔʏənˌdɔʁf ˈzaksn̩ˌbandə]; Low German: Neendörp-Sachsenbann) is a municipality in Wilstermarsch, in the district of Steinburg, in Schleswig-Holstein, Germany. The town is notable for containing the lowest accessible point in Germany, which is 3.54 m (11.61 ft) below sea level.

== History ==
The history of the town only dates back to April 15, 2003, when the town was formed from the merger of the municipalities of Neuendorf bei Wilster and Sachsenbande to the municipality of Bredensee. This new agglomeration was renamed Neuendorf-Sachsenbande.

== Economy ==
The land making up the municipality is mainly rural and involved in agriculture, but local registries indicate 30 small businesses in the municipality.

== Politics ==
The local council counts one member of the SPD, five members of the CDU, and five Independents. The design of the coat of arms symbolizes several of the local geographic and political realities, such as the recent consolidation of the cities, the nationally prominent topographical depression, and the small river, the Wilster Au, which flows through the municipality.
