= Mehlbek =

- Municipality
- Coat of arms

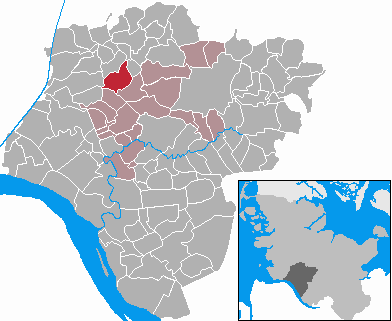
- Location of Mehlbek within Steinburg district
- Interactive map of Mehlbek
- Location within Germany Location within Schleswig-Holstein
- Coordinates: 54°0′N 9°26′E
- Country: Germany
- State: Schleswig-Holstein
- District: Steinburg
- Municipal assoc.: Itzehoe-Land

Government
  - Mayor: Otto Reese

Area
  - Total: 8.91 km^{2} (3.44 sq mi)
- Elevation: 14 m (46 ft)

Population (2025-12-31)
  - Total: 395
  - Density: 44.3/km^{2} (115/sq mi)
- Time zone: UTC+01:00 (CET)
  - Summer (DST): UTC+02:00 (CEST)
- Postal codes: 25588
- Dialling codes: 04827
- Vehicle registration: IZ
- Website: www.amtitzehoe- land.de

Mehlbek is a municipality in the district of Steinburg, in Schleswig-Holstein, Germany.
