= Oelixdorf =

- Municipality
- Coat of arms

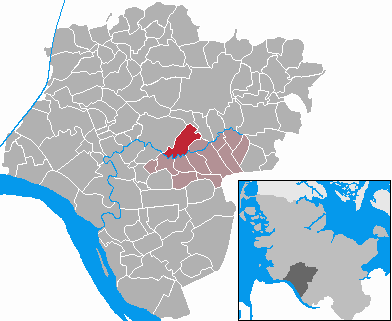
- Location of Oelixdorf within Steinburg district
- Interactive map of Oelixdorf
- Location within Germany Location within Schleswig-Holstein
- Coordinates: 53°55′N 9°34′E
- Country: Germany
- State: Schleswig-Holstein
- District: Steinburg
- Municipal assoc.: Breitenburg

Government
  - Mayor: Thies Möller (CDU)

Area
  - Total: 10.5 km^{2} (4.1 sq mi)
- Elevation: 13 m (43 ft)

Population (2025-12-31)
  - Total: 1,521
  - Density: 145/km^{2} (375/sq mi)
- Time zone: UTC+01:00 (CET)
  - Summer (DST): UTC+02:00 (CEST)
- Postal codes: 25524
- Dialling codes: 04821
- Vehicle registration: IZ
- Website: www.oelixdorf.de

Oelixdorf is a municipality in the district of Steinburg, in Schleswig-Holstein, Germany. It lies three kilometres east of Itzehoe and north of the river Stör. Federal Highway B206 and Motorway A23 run nearby. It is on the outer edge of the commuter belt surrounding the port city of Hamburg, 50 km to its south east.

Although the village of Oelixdorf (at the centre of the municipality) retains its rural character and community focus, modern residential expansion to its east and similar expansion to the west of Itzehoe mean that the village is now contiguous with its larger and more urban neighbour.

== History ==
The village was first mentioned in a document dating from 1358.
