= Aebtissinwisch =

- Municipality
- Coat of arms

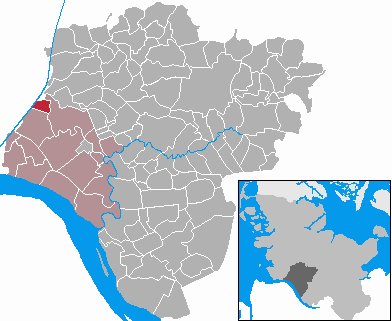
- Location of Aebtissinwisch within Steinburg district
- Interactive map of Aebtissinwisch
- Location within Germany Location within Schleswig-Holstein
- Coordinates: 53°58′N 9°17′E
- Country: Germany
- State: Schleswig-Holstein
- District: Steinburg
- Municipal assoc.: Wilstermarsch

Government
  - Mayor: Regina Kraft

Area
  - Total: 3.04 km^{2} (1.17 sq mi)
- Elevation: 10 m (33 ft)

Population (2025-12-31)
  - Total: 48
  - Density: 16/km^{2} (41/sq mi)
- Time zone: UTC+01:00 (CET)
  - Summer (DST): UTC+02:00 (CEST)
- Postal codes: 25572
- Dialling codes: 04825
- Vehicle registration: IZ
- Website: www.wilstermarsch.de

Aebtissinwisch is a municipality in the district of Steinburg, in Schleswig-Holstein, Germany.
