= Christinenthal =

- Municipality
- Coat of arms

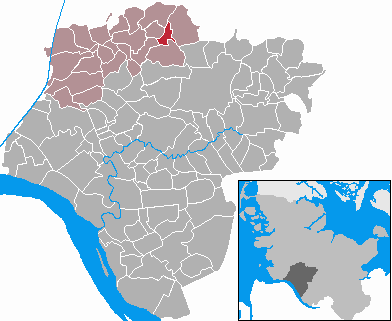
- Location of Christinenthal within Steinburg district
- Interactive map of Christinenthal
- Location within Germany Location within Schleswig-Holstein
- Coordinates: 54°3′16″N 9°31′59″E
- Country: Germany
- State: Schleswig-Holstein
- District: Steinburg
- Municipal assoc.: Schenefeld

Government
  - Mayor: Claus Peter Ralfs

Area
  - Total: 3.37 km^{2} (1.30 sq mi)
- Elevation: 15 m (49 ft)

Population (2025-12-31)
  - Total: 68
  - Density: 20/km^{2} (52/sq mi)
- Time zone: UTC+01:00 (CET)
  - Summer (DST): UTC+02:00 (CEST)
- Postal codes: 25593
- Dialling codes: 04892
- Vehicle registration: IZ

Christinenthal is a municipality in the district of Steinburg, in Schleswig-Holstein, Germany.
