= Breitenburg (Amt) =

District sub-section (Amt) in Schleswig-Holstein

- Amt
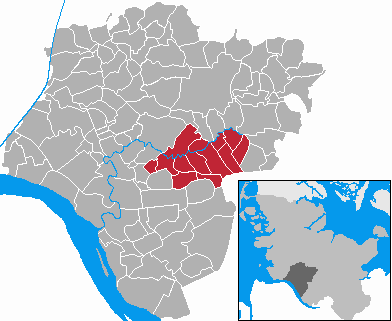
- Map of Steinburg highlighting Breitenburg
- Interactive map of Breitenburg
- Location within Germany Location within Schleswig-Holstein
- Coordinates: 53°54′N 9°34′E
- Country: Germany
- State: Schleswig-Holstein
- District: Steinburg
- Seat: Breitenburg
- Subdivisions: 11 municipalities

Area
  - Total: 69.79 km^{2} (26.95 sq mi)

Population (2025-12-31)
  - Total: 8,562
  - Density: 122.7/km^{2} (317.7/sq mi)
- Time zone: UTC+01:00 (CET)
  - Summer (DST): UTC+02:00 (CEST)
- Website: www.amt-breitenburg.de

Breitenburg is an Amt ("collective municipality") in the district of Steinburg, in Schleswig-Holstein, Germany. The seat of the Amt is in Breitenburg.

== Coat of arms ==
Amt Breitenburg has an officially approved coat of arms, granted on 10 September 1987. The coat of arms depicts an oak tree and a castle, symbolising the region’s natural environment and the historic Breitenburg castle associated with the Rantzau family. The design uses the colours red and silver, derived from the Rantzau family coat of arms, and includes repeated elements referring to the Amt’s member municipalities. The flag of Amt Breitenburg was approved on 12 September 1995 and displays the coat of arms on a red and white field.

== Municipalities ==
The Amt Breitenburg consists of the following municipalities:

1. Auufer
2. Breitenberg
3. Breitenburg
4. Kollmoor
5. Kronsmoor
6. Lägerdorf
7. Moordiek
8. Münsterdorf
9. Oelixdorf
10. Westermoor
11. Wittenbergen
