= Kremperheide =

- Municipality
- Coat of arms

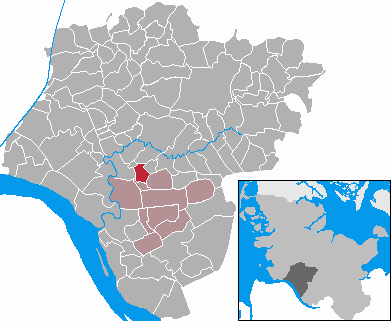
- Location of Kremperheide within Steinburg district
- Interactive map of Kremperheide
- Location within Germany Location within Schleswig-Holstein
- Coordinates: 53°53′30″N 9°29′0″E
- Country: Germany
- State: Schleswig-Holstein
- District: Steinburg
- Municipal assoc.: Krempermarsch

Government
  - Mayor: Sven Baumann (CDU)

Area
  - Total: 3.98 km^{2} (1.54 sq mi)
- Elevation: 7 m (23 ft)

Population (2025-12-31)
  - Total: 2,443
  - Density: 614/km^{2} (1,590/sq mi)
- Time zone: UTC+01:00 (CET)
  - Summer (DST): UTC+02:00 (CEST)
- Postal codes: 25569
- Dialling codes: 04821
- Vehicle registration: IZ
- Website: www.kremperheide.de

Kremperheide is a municipality in the district of Steinburg, in Schleswig-Holstein, Germany.
