= Moordiek =

- Municipality
- Coat of arms

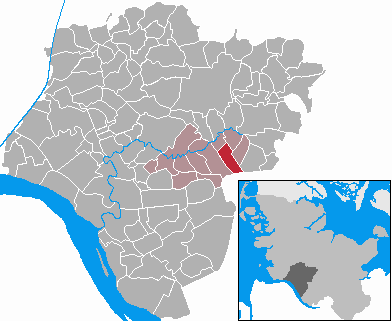
- Location of Moordiek within Steinburg district
- Interactive map of Moordiek
- Location within Germany Location within Schleswig-Holstein
- Coordinates: 53°55′N 9°39′E
- Country: Germany
- State: Schleswig-Holstein
- District: Steinburg
- Municipal assoc.: Breitenburg

Government
  - Mayor: Kurt Dammann

Area
  - Total: 6.3 km^{2} (2.4 sq mi)
- Elevation: 2 m (6.6 ft)

Population (2025-12-31)
  - Total: 110
  - Density: 17/km^{2} (45/sq mi)
- Time zone: UTC+01:00 (CET)
  - Summer (DST): UTC+02:00 (CEST)
- Postal codes: 25597
- Dialling codes: 04822
- Vehicle registration: IZ
- Website: www.amt-breitenburg.de

Moordiek is a municipality in the district of Steinburg, in Schleswig-Holstein, Germany.
