= Krummendiek =

- Municipality
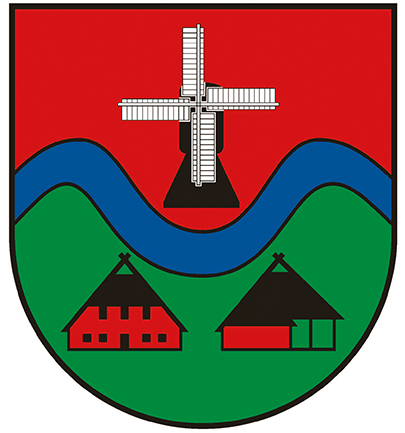
- Coat of arms

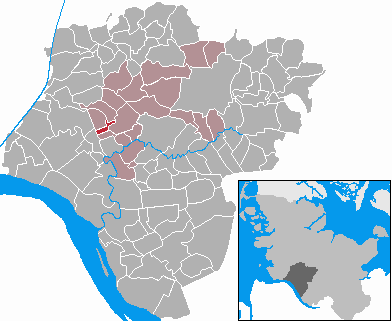
- Location of Krummendiek within Steinburg district
- Interactive map of Krummendiek
- Location within Germany Location within Schleswig-Holstein
- Coordinates: 53°56′43″N 9°25′2″E
- Country: Germany
- State: Schleswig-Holstein
- District: Steinburg
- Municipal assoc.: Itzehoe-Land

Government
  - Mayor: Hans-Peter Boie

Area
  - Total: 1.78 km^{2} (0.69 sq mi)
- Elevation: 1 m (3.3 ft)

Population (2025-12-31)
  - Total: 89
  - Density: 50/km^{2} (130/sq mi)
- Time zone: UTC+01:00 (CET)
  - Summer (DST): UTC+02:00 (CEST)
- Postal codes: 25554
- Dialling codes: 04823
- Vehicle registration: IZ
- Website: www.amtitzehoe- land.de

Krummendiek is a municipality in the district of Steinburg, in Schleswig-Holstein, Germany.
