= Sankt Margarethen, Germany =

Sankt Margarethen
- Municipality
- Coat of arms

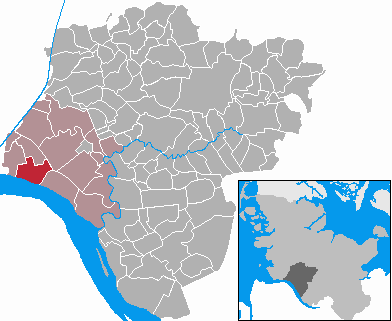
- Location of Sankt Margarethen within Steinburg district
- Interactive map of Sankt Margarethen
- Location within Germany Location within Schleswig-Holstein
- Coordinates: 53°53′26″N 9°15′24″E
- Country: Germany
- State: Schleswig-Holstein
- District: Steinburg
- Municipal assoc.: Wilstermarsch

Government
  - Mayor: Volker Bolten

Area
  - Total: 13.24 km^{2} (5.11 sq mi)
- Elevation: 3 m (9.8 ft)

Population (2025-12-31)
  - Total: 812
  - Density: 61.3/km^{2} (159/sq mi)
- Time zone: UTC+01:00 (CET)
  - Summer (DST): UTC+02:00 (CEST)
- Postal codes: 25572
- Dialling codes: 04858
- Vehicle registration: IZ
- Website: www.wilstermarsch.de

Sankt Margarethen (English: Saint Margaret) is a municipality in the district of Steinburg, in Schleswig-Holstein, Germany. It is part of the Amt Wilstermarsch in the Hamburg Metropolitan Region.

== Geography ==
=== Location ===
Sankt Margarethen is situated on the lower course of the Elbe River, eight kilometers east of Brunsbüttel and the mouth of the Kiel Canal. The municipality is crossed by Bundesstraße 431 and the German Ferry Route.

=== Administrative divisions ===
The municipality of Sankt Margarethen is divided into the following districts:

Heideducht
Kirchducht
Osterbünge
Stuven

== History ==
Sankt Margarethen was first mentioned in a document in 1344 as "Elredeluete". The village was previously known as "Elredefleth", but due to the threat posed by the Elbe river, it was demolished and relocated to its current location. The new village was inaugurated on the day of Margaret the Virgin in July 1500.

== Politics ==
=== Municipal council ===
In the municipal elections on May 14, 2023, a total of eleven seats were allocated. Once again, all seats were won by the Independent Voters' Association St. Margarethen (Unabhängige Wählergemeinschaft St. Margarethen). The voter turnout was 54.9%.

=== Mayor ===
The Mayor of Sankt Margarethen is Volker Bolten. His deputies are Hauke Carstens and Inken Rotzoll (all three from UWStM).

== Coat of arms ==
The design of the coat of arms of Sankt Margarethen was created by the heraldic designer Lothar Leissner from Itzehoe, who designed all the coats of arms in Schleswig-Holstein. The coat of arms was approved on March 9, 1993.

Blazon: "Divided by waves, silver and blue. Above, the red-clad Saint Margaret, wearing a golden martyr's crown, holding a lowered golden sword in her right hand and a golden book in her left, accompanied on each side by two six-pointed blue stars stacked on top of each other. Below, a silver dragon lying on its back with a red tongue, covered by the tip of the sword."

Explanation of the coat of arms: The saint in the coat of arms of the municipality of St. Margarethen refers both to the origin of the name of the place and its past. The martyr Margaret was thrown into a Roman dungeon and tortured for her Christian faith. She resisted attempts to convert her to paganism; this struggle is symbolized in the coat of arms by the dragon. The resistance of the inhabitants against the destructive forces of water is comparable to Margaret's fight against the dragon of temptation. The four stars in the coat of arms represent the community parts of Heideducht, Kirchducht, Osterbünge, and Stuven. At the same time, the number four signifies the close relationships between St. Margarethen and the neighboring communities of Büttel, Kudensee, and Landscheide. The lower blue half of the shield symbolizes the water of the Elbe. Furthermore, the dominant colors in the coat of arms, blue, silver, and red, are the colors of Schleswig-Holstein.

== Notable people ==
=== Sons and daughters of the municipality ===
- Martin Coronaeus (circa 1539–1585), Lutheran pastor
- Hans-Detlef Krey (1866–1928), pioneer in soil mechanics
- Otto Siemen (1881–1966), engineer, inventor, and manufacturer

=== People associated with the municipality ===
- Albert de Badrihaye (1880–1976), Flemish painter/graphic artist, professor, heraldist; he lived locally in his houseboat in the 1930s
