= Neuenbrook =

- Municipality
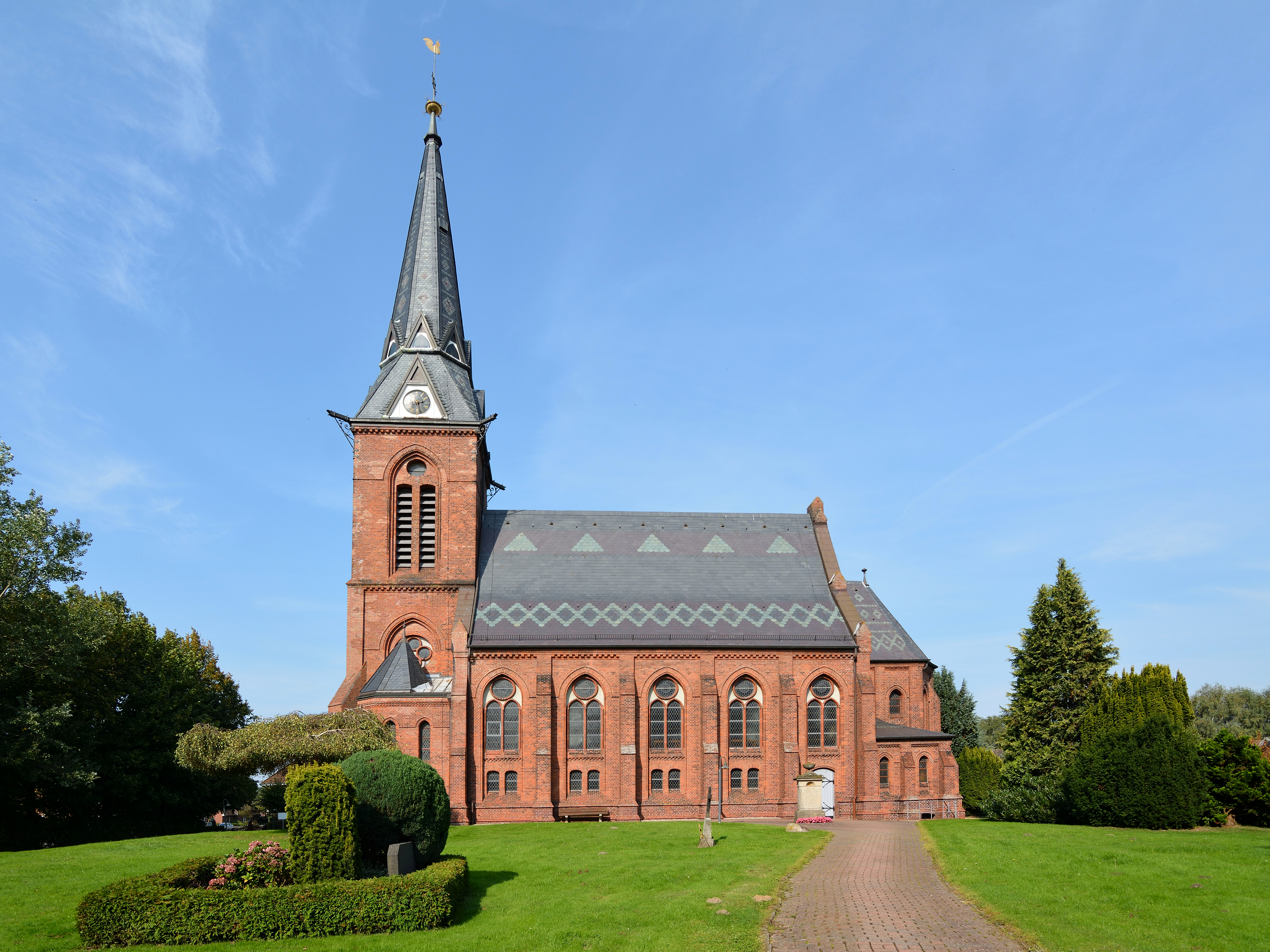

- Coat of arms

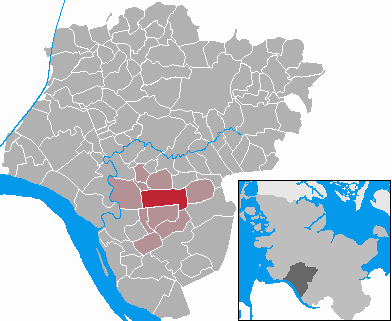
- Location of Neuenbrook within Steinburg district
- Interactive map of Neuenbrook
- Location within Germany Location within Schleswig-Holstein
- Coordinates: 53°52′N 9°33′E
- Country: Germany
- State: Schleswig-Holstein
- District: Steinburg
- Municipal assoc.: Krempermarsch

Government
  - Mayor: Jürgen Kulp

Area
  - Total: 14.32 km^{2} (5.53 sq mi)
- Elevation: 4 m (13 ft)

Population (2025-12-31)
  - Total: 678
  - Density: 47.3/km^{2} (123/sq mi)
- Time zone: UTC+01:00 (CET)
  - Summer (DST): UTC+02:00 (CEST)
- Postal codes: 25578
- Dialling codes: 04824, 04828
- Vehicle registration: IZ
- Website: www.neuenbrook.de

Neuenbrook (German pronunciation: [ˈnɔʏənˌbʁoːk]) is a municipality in the district of Steinburg, in Schleswig-Holstein, Germany.
