= Kollmoor =

- Municipality
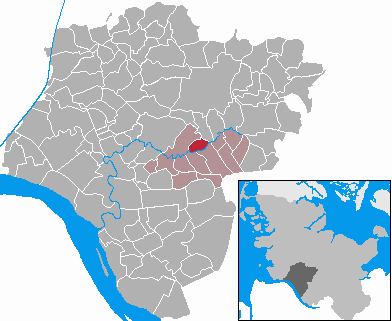
- Location of Kollmoor within Steinburg district
- Interactive map of Kollmoor
- Location within Germany Location within Schleswig-Holstein
- Coordinates: 53°55′14″N 9°35′45″E
- Country: Germany
- State: Schleswig-Holstein
- District: Steinburg
- Municipal assoc.: Breitenburg

Government
  - Mayor: Wilfried Gatzke

Area
  - Total: 3.34 km^{2} (1.29 sq mi)
- Elevation: 5 m (16 ft)

Population (2025-12-31)
  - Total: 29
  - Density: 8.7/km^{2} (22/sq mi)
- Time zone: UTC+01:00 (CET)
  - Summer (DST): UTC+02:00 (CEST)
- Postal codes: 25524
- Dialling codes: 04821
- Vehicle registration: IZ
- Website: www.amt-breitenburg.de

Kollmoor is a municipality in the district of Steinburg, in Schleswig-Holstein, Germany.

== Geography and transport ==
Kollmoor is located approximately three kilometers east of Itzehoe along the Stör river. To the north of Kollmoor runs Bundesstraße 206 from Itzehoe to Bad Segeberg, while to the southwest lies Bundesautobahn 23 from Hamburg to Itzehoe. The southern boundary of the municipality is defined by the middle of the Stör river. The Stör river and a narrow strip of land along its banks within the municipal area are part of the European NATURA 2000 protected area FFH-Gebiet Schleswig-Holsteinisches Elbästuar and adjacent areas. To the east, the boundary of the municipality alternates between the right and left banks or the middle of the Rantzau river.

== Politics ==
As the municipality has fewer than 70 inhabitants, it has a community assembly instead of a municipal council; all citizens of the municipality belong to this assembly.

== Economy ==
The municipal area is characterized by agriculture.

== Notable people ==
- Julius Seeth (1863–1939) - A lion tamer, born in Kollmoor.
