= Hodorf =

- Municipality
- Coat of arms

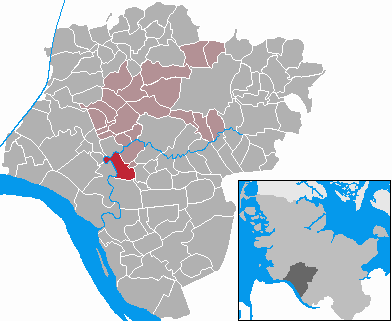
- Location of Hodorf within Steinburg district
- Interactive map of Hodorf
- Location within Germany Location within Schleswig-Holstein
- Coordinates: 53°54′N 9°26′E
- Country: Germany
- State: Schleswig-Holstein
- District: Steinburg
- Municipal assoc.: Itzehoe-Land

Government
  - Mayor: Christian Schneider

Area
  - Total: 7.49 km^{2} (2.89 sq mi)
- Elevation: 7 m (23 ft)

Population (2025-12-31)
  - Total: 196
  - Density: 26.2/km^{2} (67.8/sq mi)
- Time zone: UTC+01:00 (CET)
  - Summer (DST): UTC+02:00 (CEST)
- Postal codes: 25569
- Dialling codes: 04821
- Vehicle registration: IZ
- Website: www.amtitzehoe- land.de

Hodorf (German pronunciation: [ˈhoːdɔʁf]; Low German: Hodörp) is a municipality in the district of Steinburg, in Schleswig-Holstein, Germany.
