= Holstenniendorf =

- Municipality
- Coat of arms

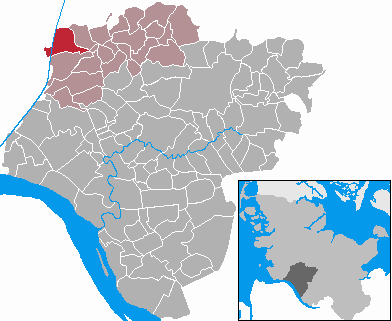
- Location of Holstenniendorf within Steinburg district
- Interactive map of Holstenniendorf
- Location within Germany Location within Schleswig-Holstein
- Coordinates: 54°2′31″N 9°20′53″E
- Country: Germany
- State: Schleswig-Holstein
- District: Steinburg
- Municipal assoc.: Schenefeld

Government
  - Mayor: Claus-Wilhelm Kühl

Area
  - Total: 12.07 km^{2} (4.66 sq mi)
- Elevation: 11 m (36 ft)

Population (2025-12-31)
  - Total: 434
  - Density: 36.0/km^{2} (93.1/sq mi)
- Time zone: UTC+01:00 (CET)
  - Summer (DST): UTC+02:00 (CEST)
- Postal codes: 25584
- Dialling codes: 04827
- Vehicle registration: IZ

Holstenniendorf is a municipality in the district of Steinburg, in Schleswig-Holstein, Germany.
