= Bokelrehm =

- Municipality
- Coat of arms

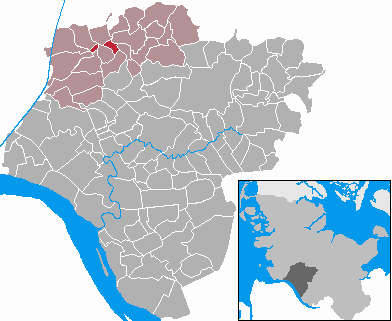
- Location of Bokelrehm within Steinburg district
- Interactive map of Bokelrehm
- Location within Germany Location within Schleswig-Holstein
- Coordinates: 54°2′35″N 9°23′30″E
- Country: Germany
- State: Schleswig-Holstein
- District: Steinburg
- Municipal assoc.: Schenefeld
- Subdivisions: 2 Ortsteile

Government
  - Mayor: Thomas Lahann

Area
  - Total: 2.69 km^{2} (1.04 sq mi)
- Elevation: 37 m (121 ft)

Population (2025-12-31)
  - Total: 136
  - Density: 50.6/km^{2} (131/sq mi)
- Time zone: UTC+01:00 (CET)
  - Summer (DST): UTC+02:00 (CEST)
- Postal codes: 25596
- Dialling codes: 04827, 04892
- Vehicle registration: IZ

Bokelrehm is a municipality in the district of Steinburg, in Schleswig-Holstein, Germany.
