= Puls, Steinburg =

Puls
- Municipality
- Coat of arms

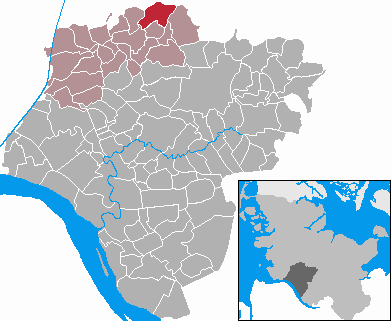
- Location of Puls within Steinburg district
- Interactive map of Puls
- Location within Germany Location within Schleswig-Holstein
- Coordinates: 54°5′3″N 9°31′11″E
- Country: Germany
- State: Schleswig-Holstein
- District: Steinburg
- Municipal assoc.: Schenefeld

Government
  - Mayor: Jens Stöver

Area
  - Total: 10.9 km^{2} (4.2 sq mi)
- Elevation: 30 m (98 ft)

Population (2025-12-31)
  - Total: 546
  - Density: 50.1/km^{2} (130/sq mi)
- Time zone: UTC+01:00 (CET)
  - Summer (DST): UTC+02:00 (CEST)
- Postal codes: 25560
- Dialling codes: 04892
- Vehicle registration: IZ
- Website: www.gemeinde-puls.com

Puls (German pronunciation: [pʊls]) is a municipality in the district of Steinburg, in Schleswig-Holstein, Germany.
