= Dammfleth =

- Municipality
- Coat of arms

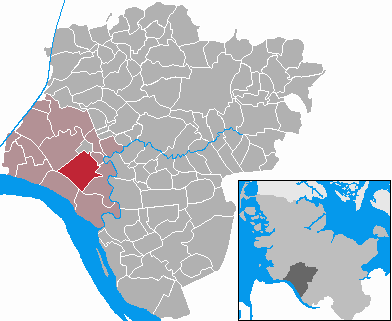
- Location of Dammfleth within Steinburg district
- Interactive map of Dammfleth
- Location within Germany Location within Schleswig-Holstein
- Coordinates: 53°54′31″N 9°22′15″E
- Country: Germany
- State: Schleswig-Holstein
- District: Steinburg
- Municipal assoc.: Wilstermarsch

Government
  - Mayor: Delf Sievers

Area
  - Total: 16.11 km^{2} (6.22 sq mi)
- Elevation: 0 m (0 ft)

Population (2025-12-31)
  - Total: 282
  - Density: 17.5/km^{2} (45.3/sq mi)
- Time zone: UTC+01:00 (CET)
  - Summer (DST): UTC+02:00 (CEST)
- Postal codes: 25554
- Dialling codes: 04823
- Vehicle registration: IZ
- Website: www.wilstermarsch.de

Dammfleth is a municipality in the district of Steinburg, in Schleswig-Holstein, Germany.
