= Huje (Germany) =

- Municipality
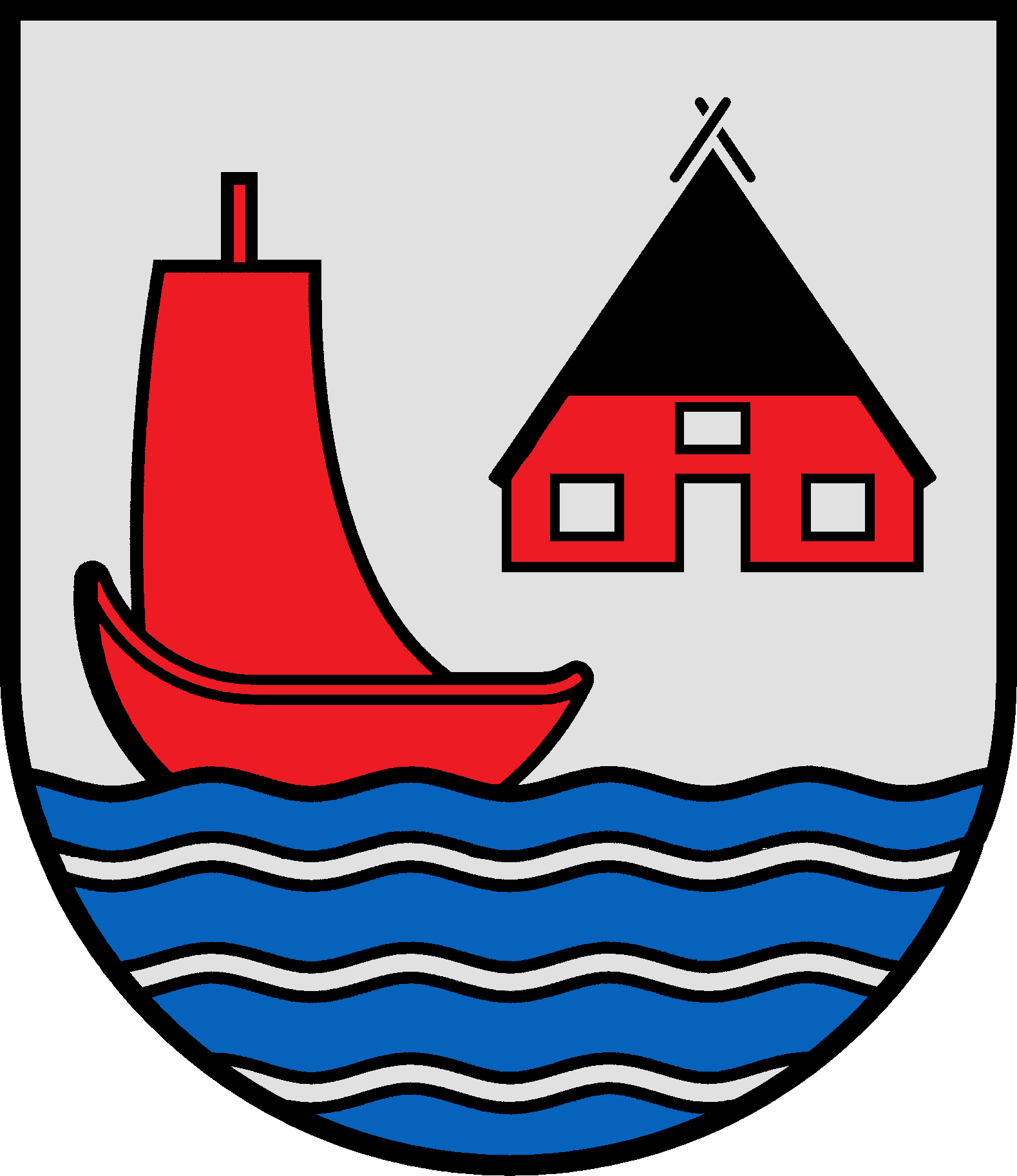
- Coat of arms

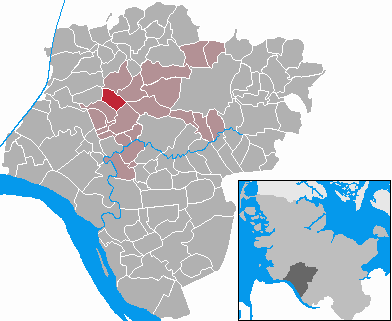
- Location of Huje within Steinburg district
- Interactive map of Huje
- Location within Germany Location within Schleswig-Holstein
- Coordinates: 53°59′N 9°26′E
- Country: Germany
- State: Schleswig-Holstein
- District: Steinburg
- Municipal assoc.: Itzehoe-Land

Government
  - Mayor: Renate Lüschow

Area
  - Total: 5.54 km^{2} (2.14 sq mi)
- Elevation: 4 m (13 ft)

Population (2025-12-31)
  - Total: 261
  - Density: 47.1/km^{2} (122/sq mi)
- Time zone: UTC+01:00 (CET)
  - Summer (DST): UTC+02:00 (CEST)
- Postal codes: 25588
- Dialling codes: 04827
- Vehicle registration: IZ
- Website: www.amtitzehoe- land.de

Huje (German pronunciation: [ˈhuːjə]) is a municipality in the district of Steinburg, in Schleswig-Holstein, Germany.

== Geography and transport ==
Huje is located approximately 6 km northwest (10 km by road) of Itzehoe. The Bekau, Moorbrook, Mühlenbach, and Krammbek rivers flow through the municipality.

== History ==
Huje was first mentioned in 1217 and likely served as a transshipment or loading place for ships.

== Politics ==
=== Municipal council ===
In the municipal election on May 14, 2023, a total of nine seats were allocated. These seats were all once again won by the Huje Municipal Voter Association. Voter turnout was 72.1%.

== Coat of arms ==
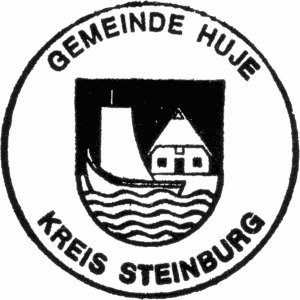

The "coat of arms" of the municipality cannot be described heraldically and is therefore not a coat of arms in the traditional sense, but rather belongs to the category of pictorial seals. It was chosen by the municipality after World War II in the absence of official seals free from Nazi and imperial symbols, and is still in use today.

== Wind farm ==
Between Huje and Nutteln lies the Huje Wind Farm with 15 wind turbines of the Vestas V66/1650 type, with a total capacity of 24,750 kW. The wind farm was repowered in 2017. A total of 13 new turbines, reaching a height of 200 metres (660 feet), are planned to be installed.
