= Breitenburg =

- Municipality
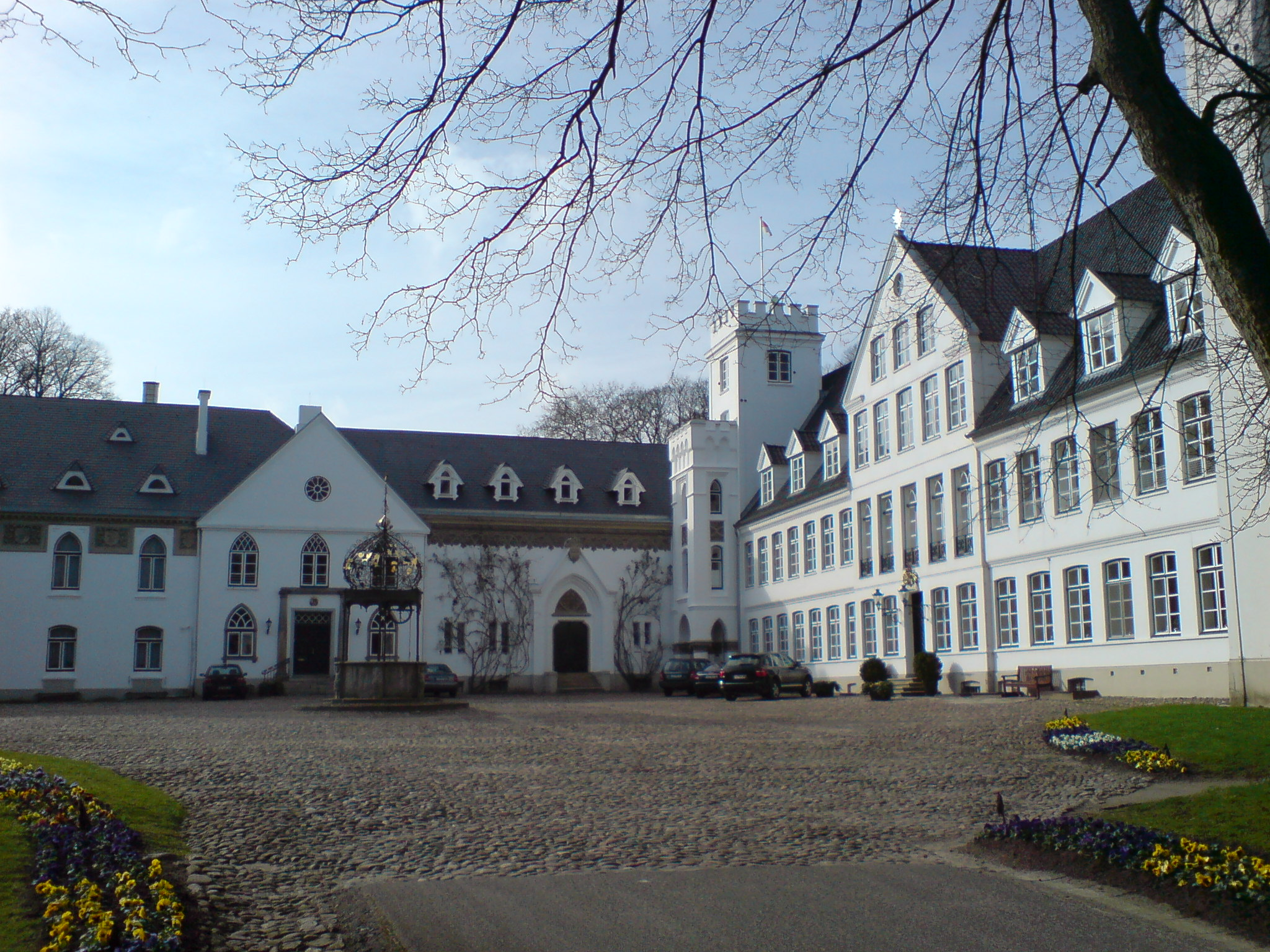
- Breitenburg Castle

- Coat of arms

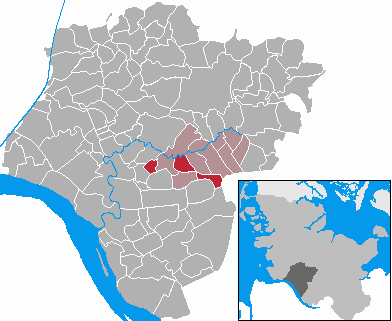
- Location of Breitenburg within Steinburg district
- Interactive map of Breitenburg
- Location within Germany Location within Schleswig-Holstein
- Coordinates: 53°53′N 9°34′E
- Country: Germany
- State: Schleswig-Holstein
- District: Steinburg
- Municipal assoc.: Breitenburg

Government
  - Mayor: Ingo Köhne

Area
  - Total: 10.49 km^{2} (4.05 sq mi)
- Elevation: 6 m (20 ft)

Population (2025-12-31)
  - Total: 1,229
  - Density: 117.2/km^{2} (303.4/sq mi)
- Time zone: UTC+01:00 (CET)
  - Summer (DST): UTC+02:00 (CEST)
- Postal codes: 25524
- Dialling codes: 04821, 04828
- Vehicle registration: IZ
- Website: www.amt- breitenburg.de

Breitenburg is a municipality in the district of Steinburg, in Schleswig-Holstein, Germany. It is situated on the river Stör, approx. 4 km southeast of Itzehoe.

Breitenburg is the seat of the Amt ("collective municipality") Breitenburg.

Breitenburg contains a lot of historic relics like castles and ancient pots.
