= Nutteln =

- Municipality
- Coat of arms

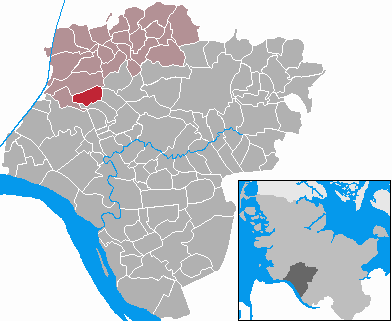
- Location of Nutteln within Steinburg district
- Interactive map of Nutteln
- Location within Germany Location within Schleswig-Holstein
- Coordinates: 53°59′20″N 9°23′17″E
- Country: Germany
- State: Schleswig-Holstein
- District: Steinburg
- Municipal assoc.: Schenefeld

Government
  - Mayor: Eckhard Breßler

Area
  - Total: 6.97 km^{2} (2.69 sq mi)
- Elevation: 15 m (49 ft)

Population (2025-12-31)
  - Total: 252
  - Density: 36.2/km^{2} (93.6/sq mi)
- Time zone: UTC+01:00 (CET)
  - Summer (DST): UTC+02:00 (CEST)
- Postal codes: 25594
- Dialling codes: 04827
- Vehicle registration: IZ

Nutteln is a municipality in the district of Steinburg, in Schleswig-Holstein, Germany.
