= Reher =

- Municipality
- Coat of arms

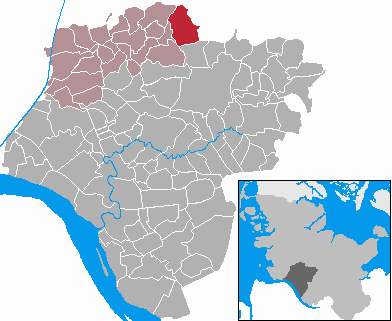
- Location of Reher within Steinburg district
- Interactive map of Reher
- Location within Germany Location within Schleswig-Holstein
- Coordinates: 54°4′2″N 9°34′28″E
- Country: Germany
- State: Schleswig-Holstein
- District: Steinburg
- Municipal assoc.: Schenefeld

Government
  - Mayor: Marianne Ehlers

Area
  - Total: 15.3 km^{2} (5.9 sq mi)
- Elevation: 21 m (69 ft)

Population (2025-12-31)
  - Total: 734
  - Density: 48.0/km^{2} (124/sq mi)
- Time zone: UTC+01:00 (CET)
  - Summer (DST): UTC+02:00 (CEST)
- Postal codes: 25593
- Dialling codes: 04876
- Vehicle registration: IZ
- Website: www.amt-schenefeld.de

Reher (German pronunciation: [ˈʁeːɐ]) is a municipality in the district of Steinburg, in Schleswig-Holstein, Germany.
