= Kaaks =

- Municipality
- Coat of arms

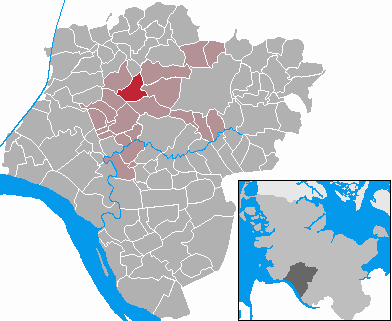
- Location of Kaaks within Steinburg district
- Interactive map of Kaaks
- Location within Germany Location within Schleswig-Holstein
- Coordinates: 53°59′N 9°28′E
- Country: Germany
- State: Schleswig-Holstein
- District: Steinburg
- Municipal assoc.: Itzehoe-Land

Government
  - Mayor: Klaus-Wilhelm Rohwedder

Area
  - Total: 8.56 km^{2} (3.31 sq mi)
- Elevation: 15 m (49 ft)

Population (2025-12-31)
  - Total: 434
  - Density: 50.7/km^{2} (131/sq mi)
- Time zone: UTC+01:00 (CET)
  - Summer (DST): UTC+02:00 (CEST)
- Postal codes: 25582
- Dialling codes: 04893
- Vehicle registration: IZ
- Website: www.amtitzehoe- land.de

Kaaks (German pronunciation: [kaːks]) is a municipality in the district of Steinburg, in Schleswig-Holstein, Germany.
