= Nienbüttel =

- Municipality
- Coat of arms

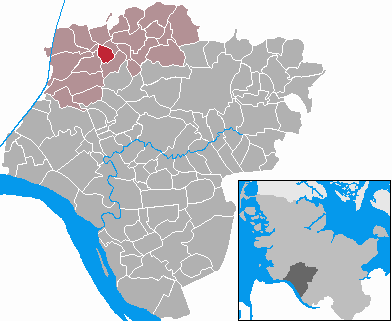
- Location of Nienbüttel within Steinburg district
- Interactive map of Nienbüttel
- Location within Germany Location within Schleswig-Holstein
- Coordinates: 54°1′49″N 9°24′54″E
- Country: Germany
- State: Schleswig-Holstein
- District: Steinburg
- Municipal assoc.: Schenefeld

Government
  - Mayor: Günter John

Area
  - Total: 4.16 km^{2} (1.61 sq mi)
- Elevation: 38 m (125 ft)

Population (2025-12-31)
  - Total: 132
  - Density: 31.7/km^{2} (82.2/sq mi)
- Time zone: UTC+01:00 (CET)
  - Summer (DST): UTC+02:00 (CEST)
- Postal codes: 25596
- Dialling codes: 04827, 04892
- Vehicle registration: IZ
- Website: www.nienbuettel.de

Nienbüttel is a municipality in the district of Steinburg, in Schleswig-Holstein, Germany.
