= Peissen =

- Municipality
- Coat of arms

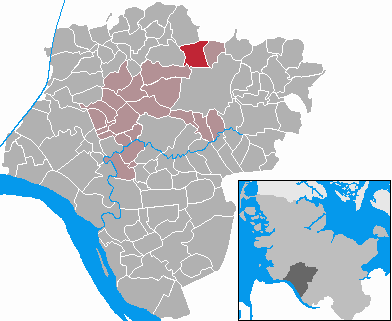
- Location of Peissen within Steinburg district
- Interactive map of Peissen
- Location within Germany Location within Schleswig-Holstein
- Coordinates: 54°1′N 9°35′E
- Country: Germany
- State: Schleswig-Holstein
- District: Steinburg
- Municipal assoc.: Itzehoe-Land

Government
  - Mayor: Bernd Thode

Area
  - Total: 10.17 km^{2} (3.93 sq mi)
- Elevation: 16 m (52 ft)

Population (2025-12-31)
  - Total: 281
  - Density: 27.6/km^{2} (71.6/sq mi)
- Time zone: UTC+01:00 (CET)
  - Summer (DST): UTC+02:00 (CEST)
- Postal codes: 25551
- Dialling codes: 04876
- Vehicle registration: IZ
- Website: www.amtitzehoe- land.de

Peissen (German pronunciation: [ˈpaɪsn̩]) is a municipality in the district of Steinburg, in Schleswig-Holstein, Germany.

Out of 7 medieval individuals tested here none were R1b.
