= Breitenberg, Schleswig-Holstein =

Breitenberg
- Municipality
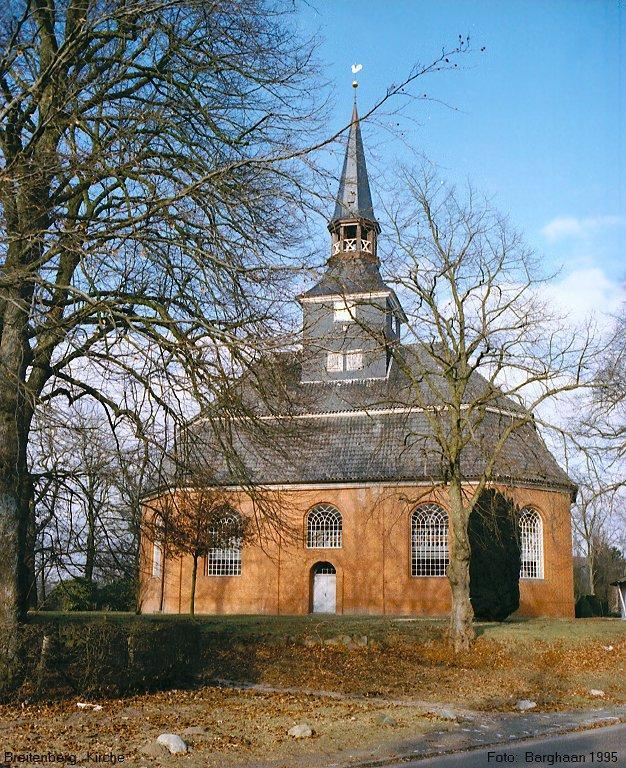
- Church in Breitenberg

- Coat of arms

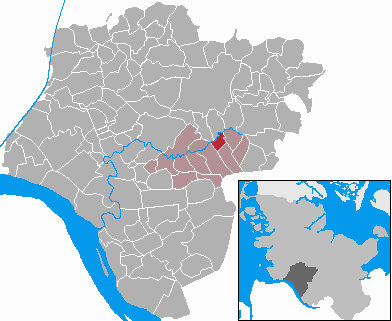
- Location of Breitenberg within Steinburg district
- Interactive map of Breitenberg
- Location within Germany Location within Schleswig-Holstein
- Coordinates: 53°55′N 9°37′E
- Country: Germany
- State: Schleswig-Holstein
- District: Steinburg
- Municipal assoc.: Breitenburg

Government
  - Mayor: Claudia Frau

Area
  - Total: 2.9 km^{2} (1.1 sq mi)
- Elevation: 4 m (13 ft)

Population (2025-12-31)
  - Total: 326
  - Density: 110/km^{2} (290/sq mi)
- Time zone: UTC+01:00 (CET)
  - Summer (DST): UTC+02:00 (CEST)
- Postal codes: 25597
- Dialling codes: 04822
- Vehicle registration: IZ
- Website: www.amt-breitenburg.de

Breitenberg (German pronunciation: [ˈbʁaɪtn̩bɛʁk]) is a municipality in the district of Steinburg, in Schleswig-Holstein, Germany.
