= Pöschendorf =

- Municipality
- Coat of arms

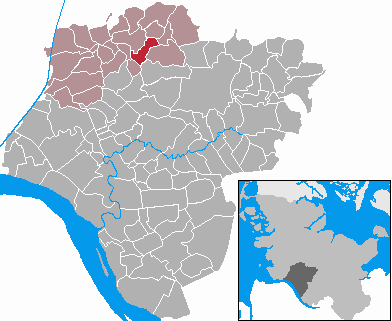
- Location of Pöschendorf within Steinburg district
- Interactive map of Pöschendorf
- Location within Germany Location within Schleswig-Holstein
- Coordinates: 54°2′18″N 9°29′24″E
- Country: Germany
- State: Schleswig-Holstein
- District: Steinburg
- Municipal assoc.: Schenefeld

Government
  - Mayor: Norbert Graf

Area
  - Total: 6.06 km^{2} (2.34 sq mi)
- Elevation: 23 m (75 ft)

Population (2025-12-31)
  - Total: 248
  - Density: 40.9/km^{2} (106/sq mi)
- Time zone: UTC+01:00 (CET)
  - Summer (DST): UTC+02:00 (CEST)
- Postal codes: 25560
- Dialling codes: 04892
- Vehicle registration: IZ
- Website: www.amt-schenefeld.de

Pöschendorf is a municipality in the district of Steinburg, in Schleswig-Holstein, Germany.
