= Schlotfeld =

- Municipality
- Coat of arms

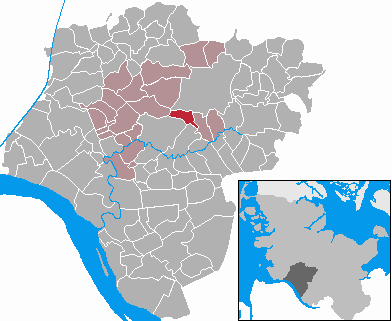
- Location of Schlotfeld within Steinburg district
- Interactive map of Schlotfeld
- Location within Germany Location within Schleswig-Holstein
- Coordinates: 53°57′26″N 9°35′1″E
- Country: Germany
- State: Schleswig-Holstein
- District: Steinburg
- Municipal assoc.: Itzehoe-Land
- Subdivisions: 5

Government
  - Mayor: Ernst Sommer

Area
  - Total: 4.8 km^{2} (1.9 sq mi)
- Elevation: 14 m (46 ft)

Population (2025-12-31)
  - Total: 215
  - Density: 45/km^{2} (120/sq mi)
- Time zone: UTC+01:00 (CET)
  - Summer (DST): UTC+02:00 (CEST)
- Postal codes: 25551
- Dialling codes: 04826
- Vehicle registration: IZ
- Website: www.amt-itzehoe-land.de

Schlotfeld is a municipality in the district of Steinburg, in Schleswig-Holstein, Germany.

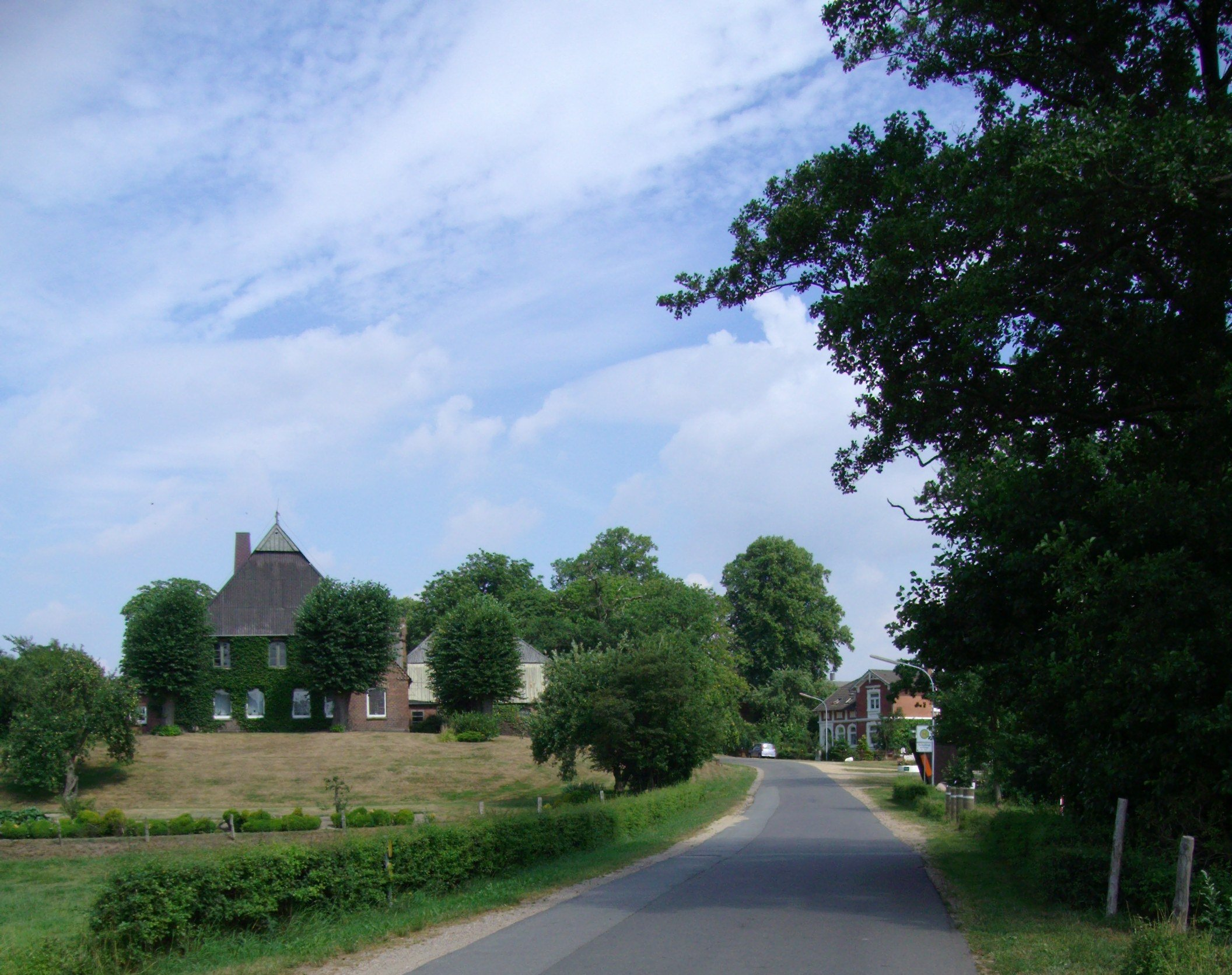
