= Landrecht, Germany =

Landrecht
- Municipality
- Coat of arms

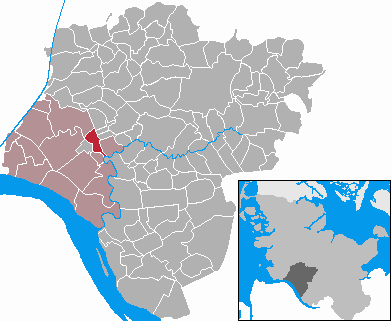
- Location of Landrecht within Steinburg district
- Interactive map of Landrecht
- Location within Germany Location within Schleswig-Holstein
- Coordinates: 53°55′34″N 9°23′55″E
- Country: Germany
- State: Schleswig-Holstein
- District: Steinburg
- Municipal assoc.: Wilstermarsch

Government
  - Mayor: Claus Bracker

Area
  - Total: 4.13 km^{2} (1.59 sq mi)
- Elevation: 1 m (3.3 ft)

Population (2025-12-31)
  - Total: 104
  - Density: 25.2/km^{2} (65.2/sq mi)
- Time zone: UTC+01:00 (CET)
  - Summer (DST): UTC+02:00 (CEST)
- Postal codes: 25554
- Dialling codes: 04823
- Vehicle registration: IZ
- Website: www.wilstermarsch.de

Landrecht is a municipality in the district of Steinburg, in Schleswig-Holstein, Germany.
