= Silzen =

- Municipality
- Coat of arms

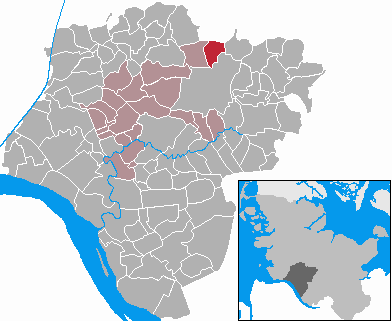
- Location of Silzen within Steinburg district
- Interactive map of Silzen
- Location within Germany Location within Schleswig-Holstein
- Coordinates: 54°1′N 9°37′E
- Country: Germany
- State: Schleswig-Holstein
- District: Steinburg
- Municipal assoc.: Itzehoe-Land

Government
  - Mayor: August Mollenhauer

Area
  - Total: 6.69 km^{2} (2.58 sq mi)
- Elevation: 22 m (72 ft)

Population (2025-12-31)
  - Total: 153
  - Density: 22.9/km^{2} (59.2/sq mi)
- Time zone: UTC+01:00 (CET)
  - Summer (DST): UTC+02:00 (CEST)
- Postal codes: 25551
- Dialling codes: 04871
- Vehicle registration: IZ
- Website: www.amt-itzehoe-land.de

Silzen (German pronunciation: [ˈzɪltsn̩]) is a municipality in the district of Steinburg, in Schleswig-Holstein, Germany.
