= Rethwisch, Steinburg =

Rethwisch
- Municipality
- Coat of arms

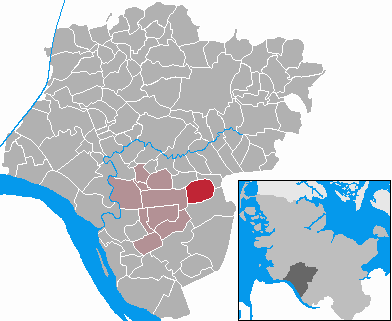
- Location of Rethwisch within Steinburg district
- Interactive map of Rethwisch
- Location within Germany Location within Schleswig-Holstein
- Coordinates: 53°52′0″N 9°35′30″E
- Country: Germany
- State: Schleswig-Holstein
- District: Steinburg
- Municipal assoc.: Krempermarsch

Government
  - Mayor: Michael Nagel

Area
  - Total: 9.83 km^{2} (3.80 sq mi)
- Elevation: 5 m (16 ft)

Population (2025-12-31)
  - Total: 528
  - Density: 53.7/km^{2} (139/sq mi)
- Time zone: UTC+01:00 (CET)
  - Summer (DST): UTC+02:00 (CEST)
- Postal codes: 25566
- Dialling codes: 04828
- Vehicle registration: IZ
- Website: www.amt- krempermarsch.de

Rethwisch is a municipality in the district of Steinburg, in Schleswig-Holstein, Germany.
