= Itzehoe-Land =

- Amt
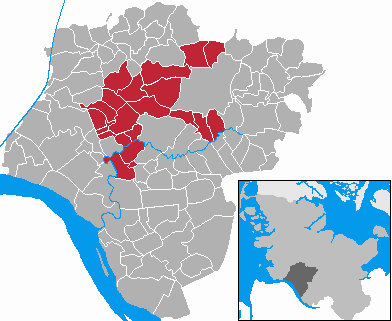
- Map of Steinburg highlighting Itzehoe-Land
- Interactive map of Itzehoe-Land
- Location within Germany Location within Schleswig-Holstein
- Coordinates: 53°56′N 9°31′E
- Country: Germany
- State: Schleswig-Holstein
- District: Steinburg
- Seat: Itzehoe
- Subdivisions: 20 municipalities

Area
  - Total: 138.5 km^{2} (53.5 sq mi)

Population (2025-12-31)
  - Total: 10,023
  - Density: 72.37/km^{2} (187.4/sq mi)
- Time zone: UTC+01:00 (CET)
  - Summer (DST): UTC+02:00 (CEST)
- Website: www.amt-itzehoe-land.de

Itzehoe-Land is an Amt ("collective municipality") in the district of Steinburg, in Schleswig-Holstein, Germany. It is situated around Itzehoe, which is the seat of the Amt, but not part of it.

The Amt Itzehoe-Land consists of the following municipalities:

1. Bekdorf
2. Bekmünde
3. Drage
4. Heiligenstedten
5. Heiligenstedtenerkamp
6. Hodorf
7. Hohenaspe
8. Huje
9. Kaaks
10. Kleve
11. Krummendiek
12. Lohbarbek
13. Mehlbek
14. Moorhusen
15. Oldendorf
16. Ottenbüttel
17. Peissen
18. Schlotfeld
19. Silzen
20. Winseldorf
