= Kaisborstel =

- Municipality
- Coat of arms

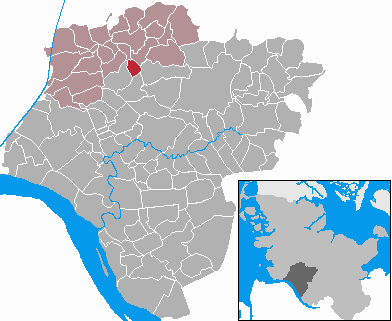
- Location of Kaisborstel within Steinburg district
- Interactive map of Kaisborstel
- Location within Germany Location within Schleswig-Holstein
- Coordinates: 54°1′N 9°28′E
- Country: Germany
- State: Schleswig-Holstein
- District: Steinburg
- Municipal assoc.: Schenefeld

Government
  - Mayor: Karl Lahann

Area
  - Total: 2.98 km^{2} (1.15 sq mi)
- Elevation: 16 m (52 ft)

Population (2025-12-31)
  - Total: 71
  - Density: 24/km^{2} (62/sq mi)
- Time zone: UTC+01:00 (CET)
  - Summer (DST): UTC+02:00 (CEST)
- Postal codes: 25560
- Dialling codes: 04892
- Vehicle registration: IZ

Kaisborstel is a municipality in the district of Steinburg, in Schleswig-Holstein, Germany.
