= Wacken, Schleswig-Holstein =

Municipality in Schleswig-Holstein, Germany

Wacken
- Municipality
- Coat of arms

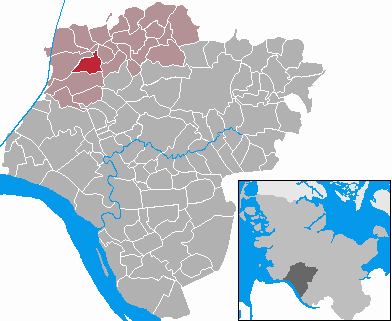
- Location of Wacken within Steinburg district
- Interactive map of Wacken
- Location within Germany Location within Schleswig-Holstein
- Coordinates: 54°1′12″N 9°22′39″E
- Country: Germany
- State: Schleswig-Holstein
- District: Steinburg
- Municipal assoc.: Schenefeld

Government
  - Mayor: Axel Kunkel

Area
  - Total: 7.1 km^{2} (2.7 sq mi)
- Elevation: 26 m (85 ft)

Population (2025-12-31)
  - Total: 2,085
  - Density: 290/km^{2} (760/sq mi)
- Time zone: UTC+01:00 (CET)
  - Summer (DST): UTC+02:00 (CEST)
- Postal codes: 25596
- Dialling codes: 04827
- Vehicle registration: IZ
- Website: wacken.de

Wacken (German pronunciation: [ˈvakn̩]) is a municipality near the town of Itzehoe in Schleswig-Holstein, Germany. Wacken was first mentioned in 1148, but there were probably some settlements before, which is proven by the trove of Germanic artefacts.

Wacken hosts the annual open-air heavy metal festival, "Wacken Open Air", The event has featured acts such as Iron Maiden, Scorpions, Saxon, Alice Cooper, Deep Purple, Mötley Crüe, Slayer, Rammstein, Motörhead, Slipknot and Judas Priest, as well as local performers, including Subway to Sally and Wacken's Firefighters' band. Local residents gets free entry to the festival.
