= Nortorf, Steinburg =

Nortorf
- Municipality
- Coat of arms

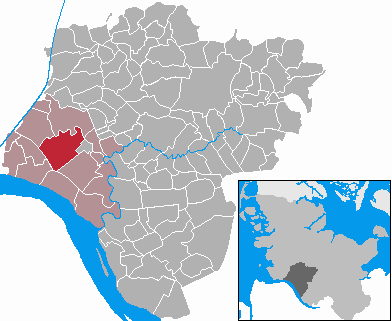
- Location of Nortorf within Steinburg district
- Interactive map of Nortorf
- Location within Germany Location within Schleswig-Holstein
- Coordinates: 53°55′N 9°19′E
- Country: Germany
- State: Schleswig-Holstein
- District: Steinburg
- Municipal assoc.: Wilstermarsch

Government
  - Mayor: Manfred Boll

Area
  - Total: 20.2 km^{2} (7.8 sq mi)
- Elevation: 27 m (89 ft)

Population (2025-12-31)
  - Total: 831
  - Density: 41.1/km^{2} (107/sq mi)
- Time zone: UTC+01:00 (CET)
  - Summer (DST): UTC+02:00 (CEST)
- Postal codes: 25554
- Dialling codes: 04823
- Vehicle registration: IZ
- Website: www.wilstermarsch.de

Nortorf (German pronunciation: [ˈnɔʁtɔʁf]) is a municipality in the district of Steinburg, in Schleswig-Holstein, Germany.
