= Ottenbüttel =

- Municipality
- Coat of arms

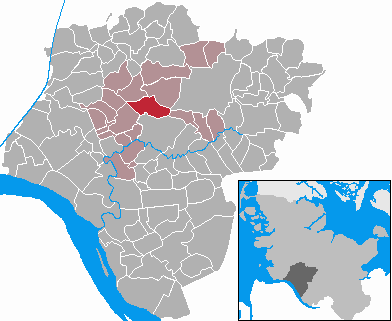
- Location of Ottenbüttel within Steinburg district
- Interactive map of Ottenbüttel
- Location within Germany Location within Schleswig-Holstein
- Coordinates: 53°58′N 9°30′E
- Country: Germany
- State: Schleswig-Holstein
- District: Steinburg
- Municipal assoc.: Itzehoe-Land

Government
  - Mayor: Heinz Maaß

Area
  - Total: 10.04 km^{2} (3.88 sq mi)
- Elevation: 16 m (52 ft)

Population (2025-12-31)
  - Total: 682
  - Density: 67.9/km^{2} (176/sq mi)
- Time zone: UTC+01:00 (CET)
  - Summer (DST): UTC+02:00 (CEST)
- Postal codes: 25591
- Dialling codes: 04893
- Vehicle registration: IZ
- Website: www.amtitzehoe-br />land.de

Ottenbüttel is a municipality in the district of Steinburg, in Schleswig-Holstein, Germany.
