= Winseldorf =

- Municipality
- Coat of arms

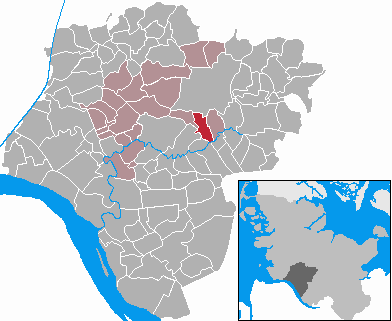
- Location of Winseldorf within Steinburg district
- Interactive map of Winseldorf
- Location within Germany Location within Schleswig-Holstein
- Coordinates: 53°56′47″N 9°36′28″E
- Country: Germany
- State: Schleswig-Holstein
- District: Steinburg
- Municipal assoc.: Itzehoe-Land

Government
  - Mayor: Udo Fölster

Area
  - Total: 5.62 km^{2} (2.17 sq mi)
- Elevation: 6 m (20 ft)

Population (2025-12-31)
  - Total: 306
  - Density: 54.4/km^{2} (141/sq mi)
- Time zone: UTC+01:00 (CET)
  - Summer (DST): UTC+02:00 (CEST)
- Postal codes: 25551
- Dialling codes: 04826
- Vehicle registration: IZ
- Website: www.amt-itzehoe-land.de

Winseldorf is a municipality in the district of Steinburg, in Schleswig-Holstein, Germany.
