= Hadenfeld =

- Municipality
- Coat of arms

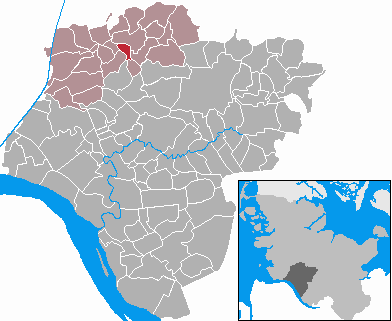
- Location of Hadenfeld within Steinburg district
- Interactive map of Hadenfeld
- Location within Germany Location within Schleswig-Holstein
- Coordinates: 54°1′58″N 9°27′29″E
- Country: Germany
- State: Schleswig-Holstein
- District: Steinburg
- Municipal assoc.: Schenefeld

Government
  - Mayor: Rolf Strauch

Area
  - Total: 2.35 km^{2} (0.91 sq mi)
- Elevation: 19 m (62 ft)

Population (2025-12-31)
  - Total: 153
  - Density: 65.1/km^{2} (169/sq mi)
- Time zone: UTC+01:00 (CET)
  - Summer (DST): UTC+02:00 (CEST)
- Postal codes: 25560
- Dialling codes: 04892
- Vehicle registration: IZ

Hadenfeld is a municipality in the district of Steinburg, in Schleswig-Holstein, Germany.
