= Warringholz =

- Municipality
- Coat of arms

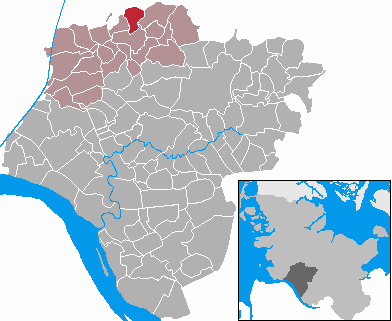
- Location of Warringholz within Steinburg district
- Interactive map of Warringholz
- Location within Germany Location within Schleswig-Holstein
- Coordinates: 54°4′47″N 9°27′52″E
- Country: Germany
- State: Schleswig-Holstein
- District: Steinburg
- Municipal assoc.: Schenefeld

Government
  - Mayor: Wolfgang Knop

Area
  - Total: 6.3 km^{2} (2.4 sq mi)
- Elevation: 31 m (102 ft)

Population (2025-12-31)
  - Total: 290
  - Density: 46/km^{2} (120/sq mi)
- Time zone: UTC+01:00 (CET)
  - Summer (DST): UTC+02:00 (CEST)
- Postal codes: 25560
- Dialling codes: 04892
- Vehicle registration: IZ
- Website: www.amt-schenefeld.de

Warringholz is a municipality in the district of Steinburg, in Schleswig-Holstein, Germany.
