= Schenefeld, Steinburg =

Schenefeld
- Municipality
- Coat of arms

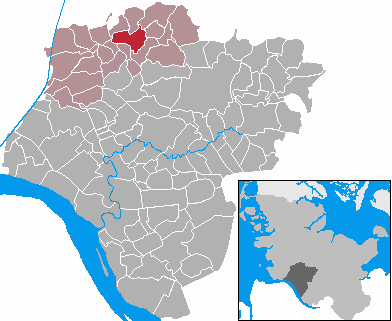
- Location of Schenefeld within Steinburg district
- Interactive map of Schenefeld
- Location within Germany Location within Schleswig-Holstein
- Coordinates: 54°3′N 9°29′E
- Country: Germany
- State: Schleswig-Holstein
- District: Steinburg
- Municipal assoc.: Schenefeld

Government
  - Mayor: Hans-Heinrich Barnick (CDU)

Area
  - Total: 9.38 km^{2} (3.62 sq mi)
- Elevation: 27 m (89 ft)

Population (2025-12-31)
  - Total: 2,884
  - Density: 307/km^{2} (796/sq mi)
- Time zone: UTC+01:00 (CET)
  - Summer (DST): UTC+02:00 (CEST)
- Postal codes: 25560
- Dialling codes: 04892
- Vehicle registration: IZ
- Website: www.schenefeld.de

Schenefeld (German pronunciation: [ˈʃeːnəfɛlt]) is a municipality in the district of Steinburg, in Schleswig-Holstein, Germany. It is situated approximately 14 km north of Itzehoe.

Schenefeld is the seat of the Amt ("collective municipality") Schenefeld.

The population was roughly 2,447 people as of 2008.
