= Steinburg =

Coordinates: 53°55′N 9°30′E

- District
- Flag Coat of arms

- Country: Germany
- State: Schleswig-Holstein
- Capital: Itzehoe

Government
  - District admin.: Claudius Teske

Area
  - Total: 1,056 km^{2} (408 sq mi)

Population (31 December 2024)
  - Total: 132,731
  - Density: 125.7/km^{2} (325.5/sq mi)
- Time zone: UTC+01:00 (CET)
  - Summer (DST): UTC+02:00 (CEST)
- Vehicle registration: IZ
- Website: kreis-steinburg.de

Steinburg (German pronunciation: [ˈʃtaɪnbʊʁk]) is a district in Schleswig-Holstein, Germany, administered from Itzehoe. It is bounded by (from the west and clockwise) the districts of Dithmarschen, Rendsburg-Eckernförde, Segeberg and Pinneberg, and by the Elbe River (and the district of Stade beyond).

== History ==
The district's name is derived from a medieval castle called Steinburg, where the reeves ruled by order of their lords, the dukes of Holstein. This castle was first mentioned in 1307, and it was abandoned and demolished in 1630. However, Steinburg remained the name of the region, and its new centre became Glückstadt before gradually moving to the town of Itzehoe.

When Schleswig-Holstein became a province of Prussia in 1867, the district of Steinburg was established. The borders remained unchanged until 1970 when the newly founded town Schenefeld (formerly part of Rendsburg district) joined Steinburg.

== Geography ==
The district is situated on the northern bank of the Elbe river, close to its mouth. The countryside is very plain. The Stör river, a right-hand tributary of the Elbe, flows through the district. Today the towns in Steinburg gradually become a part of the growing Hamburg metropolitan area. The lowest land point of the Federal Republic of Germany at 3,54 meters below sea level is located near the city of Wilster. Steinburg's highest point is the Itzespitze (83.4 m).

== Coat of arms ==
The coat of arms displays a castle (symbolising Steinburg Castle) above a wavy line (representing the Elbe river). Below the castle's towers there are three shields depicting Christ, a nettle leaf (from the arms of Holstein) and a swan.

== Towns and municipalities ==
Independent towns
1. Glückstadt
2. Itzehoe
3. Wilster

Ämter
1. Breitenburg; 1. Auufer; 2. Breitenberg; 3. Breitenburg^{1}; 4. Kollmoor; 5. Kronsmoor; 6. Lägerdorf; 7. Moordiek; 8. Münsterdorf; 9. Oelixdorf; 10. Westermoor; 11. Wittenbergen; 2. Horst-Herzhorn; 1. Altenmoor; 2. Blomesche Wildnis; 3. Borsfleth; 4. Engelbrechtsche Wildnis; 5. Herzhorn; 6. Hohenfelde; 7. Horst^{1}; 8. Kiebitzreihe; 9. Kollmar; 10. Krempdorf; 11. Neuendorf bei Elmshorn; 12. Sommerland; 3. Itzehoe-Land (seat: Itzehoe); 1. Bekdorf; 2. Bekmünde; 3. Drage; 4. Heiligenstedten; 5. Heiligenstedtenerkamp; 6. Hodorf; 7. Hohenaspe; 8. Huje; 9. Kaaks; 10. Kleve; 11. Krummendiek; 12. Lohbarbek; 13. Mehlbek; 14. Moorhusen; 15. Oldendorf; 16. Ottenbüttel; 17. Peissen; 18. Schlotfeld; 19. Silzen; 20. Winseldorf	4. Kellinghusen; 1. Brokstedt; 2. Fitzbek; 3. Hennstedt; 4. Hingstheide; 5. Hohenlockstedt; 6. Kellinghusen^{1}; 7. Lockstedt; 8. Mühlenbarbek; 9. Oeschebüttel; 10. Poyenberg; 11. Quarnstedt; 12. Rade; 13. Rosdorf; 14. Sarlhusen; 15. Störkathen; 16. Wiedenborstel; 17. Willenscharen; 18. Wrist; 19. Wulfsmoor; 5. Krempermarsch; 1. Bahrenfleth; 2. Dägeling; 3. Elskop; 4. Grevenkop; 5. Krempe^{1, 2}; 6. Kremperheide; 7. Krempermoor; 8. Neuenbrook; 9. Rethwisch; 10. Süderau	6. Schenefeld; 1. Aasbüttel; 2. Agethorst; 3. Besdorf; 4. Bokelrehm; 5. Bokhorst; 6. Christinenthal; 7. Gribbohm; 8. Hadenfeld; 9. Holstenniendorf; 10. Kaisborstel; 11. Looft; 12. Nienbüttel; 13. Nutteln; 14. Oldenborstel; 15. Pöschendorf; 16. Puls; 17. Reher; 18. Schenefeld^{1}; 19. Vaale; 20. Vaalermoor; 21. Wacken; 22. Warringholz; 7. Wilstermarsch (seat: Wilster); 1. Aebtissinwisch; 2. Beidenfleth; 3. Brokdorf; 4. Büttel; 5. Dammfleth; 6. Ecklak; 7. Kudensee; 8. Landrecht; 9. Landscheide; 10. Neuendorf-Sachsenbande; 11. Nortorf; 12. Sankt Margarethen; 13. Stördorf; 14. Wewelsfleth
^{1}seat of the Amt;^{2}town

== Transport ==
Logo of the transport association HVV

Steinburg district is located in the area of the transport association Hamburger Verkehrsverbund (HVV).
