= Bundesautobahn 23 =

Federal motorway in Germany

A 23
- Bundesautobahn 23
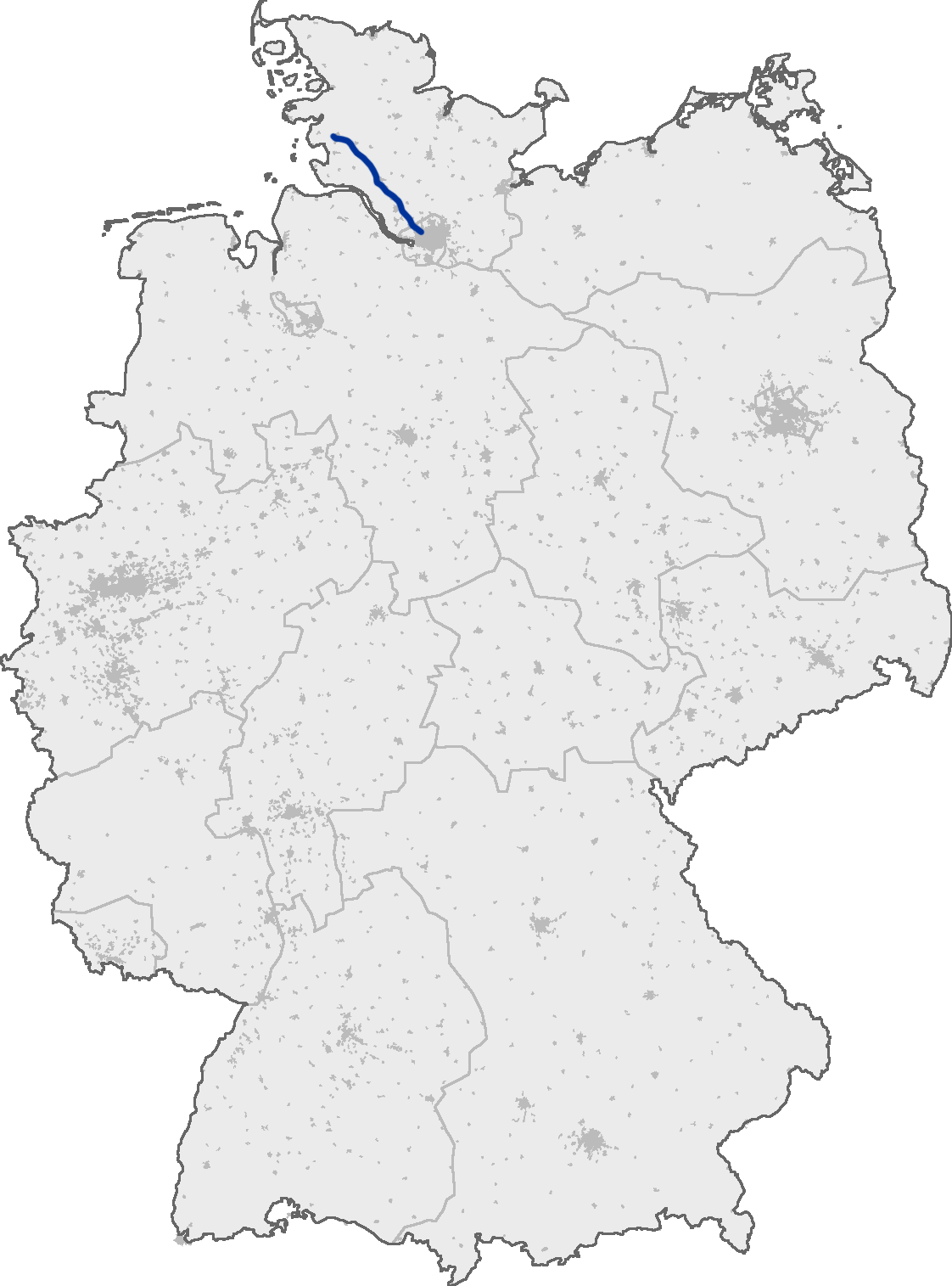

Route information
- Length: 96 km (60 mi)

Major junctions
- North end: B 5 in Heide
- South end: A 7 in Hamburg

Location
- Country: Germany
- States: Schleswig-Holstein, Hamburg

Highway system
- Roads in Germany; Autobahns; List; Federal; List; State; E-roads
← A 21	→ A 24

Bundesautobahn 23 (translates from German as Federal Motorway 23, short form Autobahn 23, abbreviated as BAB 23 or A 23) is an autobahn in Germany. It runs largely parallel to the Bundesstraße 5; its main purpose is to connect the hinterland of Hamburg. North of Heide, the A 23 becomes B 5 and connects Eiderstedt, Husum and the ferries to the islands of Nordfriesland to the autobahn network.

== Exit list ==
State	District	Location	km	mi	Exit	Name	Destinations	Notes
Schleswig-Holstein	Dithmarschen	Norderwöhrden	95.9	59.6	—	—	B 5 – Husum, Tönning	Northern endpoint of motorway
Schleswig-Holstein	Dithmarschen	Norderwöhrden	95.0	59.0	2	Heide-West	B 203 – Heide, Büsum, Rendsburg, Wesselburen	Rendsburg is only signed southbound Wesselburen is only signed northbound
Schleswig-Holstein	Dithmarschen	Hemmingstedt	91.3	56.7	3	Heide-Süd	B 5 – Heide, Brunsbüttel, Meldorf, Hemmingstedt	Brunsbüttel and Meldorf are only signed southbound Süd means south
Schleswig-Holstein	Dithmarschen	Tensbüttel-Röst	79.3	49.3	Rest area	Dithmarscher Geest	Dithmarscher Geest rest area	
Schleswig-Holstein	Dithmarschen	Tensbüttel-Röst	76.9	47.8	4	Albersdorf	B 431 – Meldorf; Albersdorf	
Schleswig-Holstein	Dithmarschen	Schafstedt	71.4	44.4	5	Schafstedt	Schafstedt, Süderhastedt	
Schleswig-Holstein	Kiel Canal	Hohenhörn	69.7	43.3	Bridge	Hochbrücke Hohenhörn	Kiel Canal	length: 390.5 m
Schleswig-Holstein	Rendsburg-Eckernförde	Bendorf	69.1	42.9	Parking area	Nord-Ostsee-Kanal	Nord-Ostsee-Kanal parking area	Nord-Ostsee-Kanal is the german word for Kiel Canal
Schleswig-Holstein	Steinburg	Besdorf	66.0	41.0	6	Hanerau-Hademarschen	Hanerau-Hademarschen, Wacken, Besdorf	Wacken is only signed southbound
Schleswig-Holstein	Steinburg	Agethorst	60.1	37.3	7	Schenefeld	B 430 – Schenefeld, Neumünster; Wacken	Wacken is only signed northbound Neumünster is only signed southbound
Schleswig-Holstein	Steinburg	Kaaks	56.6	35.2	Rest area	Kaaksburg	Kaaksburg rest area	
Schleswig-Holstein	Steinburg	Itzehoe	51.1	31.8	8	Itzehoe-Nord	Itzehoe-Nord, Krankenhaus, Innovationszentrum	Nord means north Krankenhaus means hospital Innovationszentrum means innovation center
Schleswig-Holstein	Steinburg	Itzehoe	48.4	30.1	9	Itzehoe-Mitte	B 5 – Brunsbüttel; B 206 – Itzehoe-Mitte, Lübeck	Mitte means middle
Schleswig-Holstein	Steinburg	Itzehoe	47.4	29.5	Bridge	Störbrücke	Stör	length: 1155 m
Schleswig-Holstein	Steinburg	Breitenburg	43.1	26.8	10	Itzehoe-Süd	Itzehoe-Süd	Süd means south
Schleswig-Holstein	Steinburg	Lägerdorf	39.0	24.2	11	Lägerdorf	Lägerdorf, Rethwisch	
Schleswig-Holstein	Steinburg	Hohenfelde	34.7	21.6	12	Hohenfelde	Hohenfelde, Wrist, Krempe, Glückstadt, Elbefähre	Krempe is only signed northbound Grückstadt and the ferry at Glückstadt are only signed southbound Elbefähre is a ferry which crosses the Elbe river between Glückstadt and Wischhafen
Schleswig-Holstein	Steinburg	Horst			—	Hohenfelde interchange	A 20 – Bremerhaven, Lübeck	interchange planned
Schleswig-Holstein	Steinburg	Horst	32.2	20.0	Rest area	Steinburg	Steinburg rest area	Restaurant and gas station planned
Schleswig-Holstein	Pinneberg (district)	Klein Offenseth-Sparrieshoop	28.4	17.6	13	Horst/Elmshorn	Horst/Elmshorn, Barmstedt	Barmstedt is only signed southbound
Schleswig-Holstein	Pinneberg (district)	Elmshorn	20.7	12.9	14	Elmshorn	B 431 – Elmshorn	
Schleswig-Holstein	Pinneberg (district)	Tornesch	16.5	10.3	15	Tornesch	Tornesch, Uetersen, Barmstedt	Barmstedt is only signed northbound
Schleswig-Holstein	Pinneberg (district)	Tornesch	14.8	9.2	Rest area	Forst Rantzau	Forst Rantzau rest area	
Schleswig-Holstein	Pinneberg (district)	Pinneberg	11.3	7.0	16	Pinneberg-Nord	Pinneberg-Nord, Quickborn, Kummerfeld	Nord means north
Schleswig-Holstein	Pinneberg (district)	Rellingen	8.3	5.2	17	Pinneberg-Mitte	Pinneberg-Mitte, Rellingen-Nord	Entrance equipped with Ramp meter Nord means north Mitte means middle
Schleswig-Holstein	Pinneberg (district)	Pinneberg	7.5	4.7	18	Pinneberg-Süd	Pinneberg-Süd, Wedel	Süd means south
Schleswig-Holstein	Pinneberg (district)	Halstenbek	6.2	3.9	19	Halstenbek/Rellingen	Halstenbek, Rellingen, Schenefeld, Pinneberg-Waldenau	Entrance equipped with Ramp meter
Schleswig-Holstein	Pinneberg (district)	Halstenbek	3.7	2.3	20	Halstenbek-Krupunder	Halstenbek-Krupunder, Rellingen-Süd	Entrance equipped with Ramp meter Süd means south
Hamburg	Eimsbüttel	Eidelstedt	1.2	0.75	21	Hamburg-Eidelstedt	A 7 / E45 – Flensburg, Kiel, Hamburg Airport; B 4 – Hamburg-Eidelstedt	All destinations of A 7 motorway are only signed southbound
Hamburg	Eimsbüttel	Eidelstedt	0.0	0.0	22	Hamburg-Nordwest interchange	A 7 / E45 – Hannover, Bremen, Hamburg-Stellingen	incomplete junction: exit ramp: Heide → Flensburg/Kiel has an At-grade intersection directly connected to the previous exit Southern endpoint of motorway Nordwest means north-west
1.000 mi = 1.609 km; 1.000 km = 0.621 mi: Incomplete access; Proposed; Route transition
