= Transport in Hamburg =

Transport in Hamburg comprises an extensive, rail system, subway system, airports and maritime services for the more than 1.8 million inhabitants of the city of Hamburg and 5.3 million people in the Hamburg Metropolitan Region.

Since the Middle Ages, as a Hanseatic City one part of Hamburg's transport was the economic trade with other cities or regions. In 2011, the port of Hamburg was the third-largest port in Europe. Hamburg is connected to four motorways and in Hamburg proper are two airports. The Hamburg traffic group Hamburger Verkehrsverbund (HVV) was the first organisation of its kind in the world and in 2008, was in charge for the public transport management in three German states. In 2007, more than 618 million passengers used bus, rapid transit, ferries or light rail.

== History ==
A charter in 1189 by Frederick I, Holy Roman Emperor granted Hamburg the status of a free imperial city and tax-free access up the Lower Elbe into the North Sea, the right to fish and to cut trees, and the freedom of military service. The charter was given orally for Hamburg's backing of Frederick's crusades, and in 1265 an in all probability forged letter was presented to or by the Rath (Council; Rat in antiquated writing style) of Hamburg. In 1241, the two contracts between Hamburg and Lübeck marked the beginning of the Hanseatic League, a trade union in Northern Europe. And in 1264 the Steinstraße was the third cobbled road in Europe, the east-west route for commerce.

In 1800 Hamburg has 1,473 street-lamps and on the Hamburg hill in St. Pauli several new streets were given Christian names e.g. Davidstraße, Erichstraße or Herbertstraße.

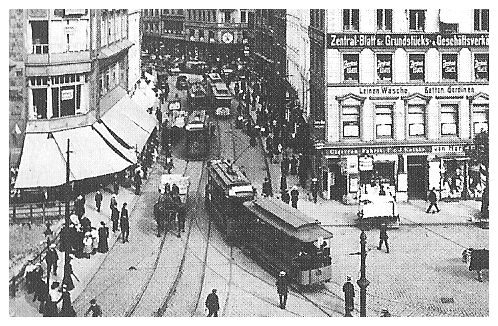
Street Großer Burstah in Altstadt quarter in 1900

On 31 October 1839, the first horse-drawn bus line served a scheduled route from Hamburg to the then Danish Altona. In 1866, the Hamburg tramway network was opened. Initially, it was operated with horsecar trams. In 1894, Hamburg's first electric tram served Meßberg – Lombardsbrücke – Landungsbrücken – Zollkanal – Meßberg.

In 1906, the Hamburg Hauptbahnhof was built and the rail lines—like the Rollbahn line—were expanded into the city centre, and in 1910 a hall for the air traffic with zeppelins was built in Fuhlsbüttel. 1911, the first tunnel under a river in continental Europe was finished, and Benzindroschken (gasoline-run vehicles) were allowed on Hamburg's streets.

In 1912, the port of Hamburg provided 64 km moorings for more than 15,000 seagoing vessels, arriving in Hamburg. The Hamburger Hochbahn (HHA) was founded in 1911, and the first metro trains ran on the circle line in 1912.

The Hamburger Verkehrsverbund (HVV) was founded on 29 November 1965 with the four initial partners the Hamburger Hochbahn AG (HHA), the Deutsche Bundesbahn, the HADAG Seetouristik und Fährdienst AG and Verkehrsbetriebe Hamburg-Holstein AG (VHH). On 1 October 1978, after 84 years of service, the last tram served line no. 2 from Rathausmarkt to Schnelsen.

== Infrastructure ==
In 2008, Hamburg had an area of 755.2 km^{2} (291.6 sq mi), 92% was land and 8% water areas. Area for the traffic infrastructure was 12% (9,183 ha or 35.46 sq mi). These were non built-up areas.

== Airports ==
Opened in 1911, Hamburg Airport, is situated in Fuhlsbüttel in the north of the city. In 2008, the airport had an area of 5.7 km^{2} (2.2 sq mi), and handled 152.271 take-offs and landings and 12,690,114 passengers in total. 33,108 t (36,495 short tons; 32,585 long tons) of cargo were transported. Hamburg Finkenwerder Airport is a private airport for EADS plant, situated in Finkenwerder, on the south bank of the Elbe river.

== Cycling ==
In 2008, Hamburg had more than 1,700 km (1,100 mi) cycle paths, but—according to the ADFC (German cyclist club)—in a devastated condition, which repairs would cost the city Euro 10 million. The Behörde für Stadtentwicklung und Umwelt designated 14 major cycle ways to improve the daily use of bicycles in Hamburg, and claimed to start a bicycle sharing system like in Paris. The project StadtRAD Hamburg was started in July 2009 and is today one of the most successful system of its kind in Germany.

== Pedestrians ==
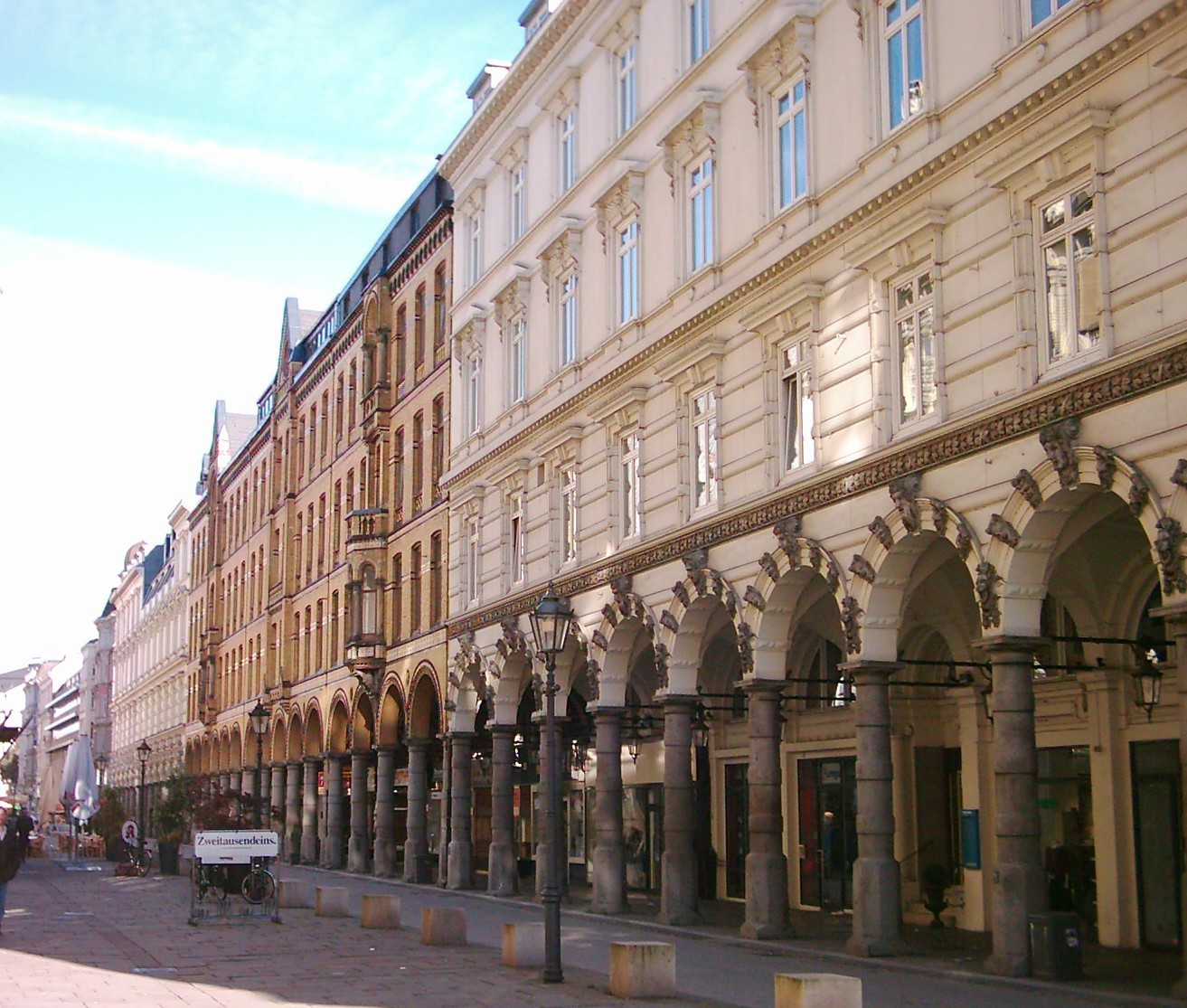
Colonaden street in 2007

Hamburg has several pedestrian zones, streets renovated into car free zones. The first street transformed was in Essen in 1926, like many West Germany cities Hamburg renovated several streets in the city's centre in the 1970s. The street Colonnaden built by private investors in 1874 was renovated in 1978, it is one of the oldest pedestrian zones in Hamburg. Other zones only in the city's centre are Deichstraße, Gänsemarkt, Gerhart-Hauptmann-Platz, Gerhofstraße, Gertrudenkirchhof, Gertrudenstraße, Großneumarkt, Kurze Mühren, Lange Mühren, Peterstraße, Rathausmarkt, and Spitalerstraße. In 2008, the Mönckebergstraße − open to public transport buses and taxis only − had 10,620 pedestrians per hour. In total, only 20% of all pedestrians zones in Germany are located in housing areas. Hamburg started several small housing projects.

There are also trails in Hamburg, e.g. the Alsterwanderweg (Alster river trail), Elbewanderweg (Elbe river trail), and in Hamburg is a part of the European walking route E1. Because Neuwerk island is part of Hamburg, hiking trails in the Hamburg Wadden Sea National Park are also in the state's proper.

In 2006, the city of Hamburg installed a pedestrian guidance system in its centre.

== Public transport ==
HVV figures of 2015
Bus and ferry lines	701
Rapid transit rail lines	32
Network length	20,779
Vehicles	4,289
Car km (mil.)	338,23
HVV passengers total (mil.)	751
Fare revenue (mil. Euro)	788,6
Public transport operators	29

Public transport in Hamburg consists of buses, metro and light rail, commuter trains, car pool services, taxis, services for senior citizens and people with disabilities. The Hamburger Verkehrsverbund (HVV) manage and coordinate the public mass transport with busses, ferries and trains for the Public Transport Authorities—the three states: Hamburg, Lower Saxony, and Schleswig-Holstein, and several districts. The 35 operating cooperations provide the transport services and some of the customer services.

=== Buses ===
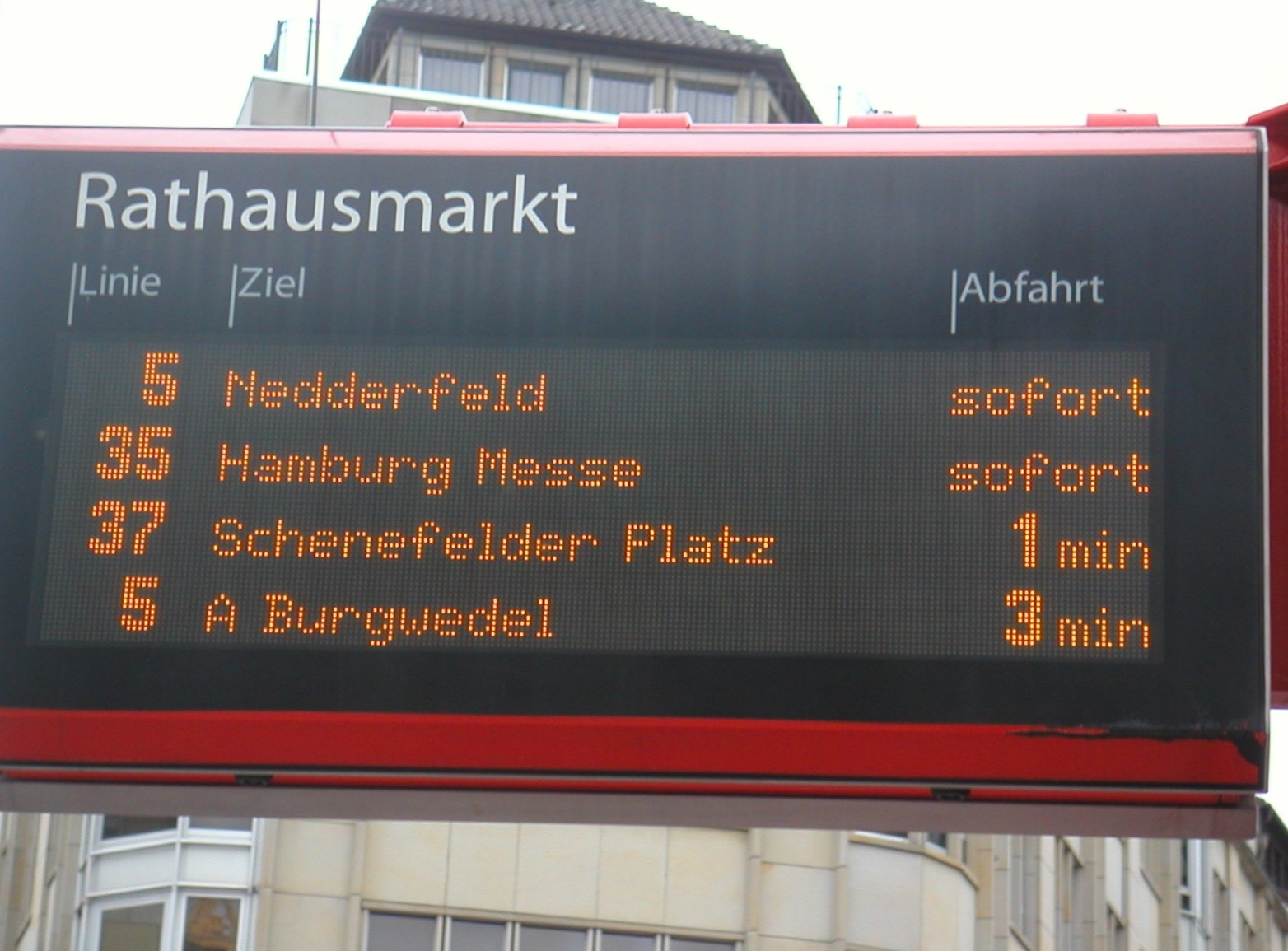
Passenger information system at a bus stop in the city centre

Major company for the public bus services is the Hamburg Hochbahn AG (HHA) with more than 100 lines and 120,000 km (75,000 mi) driven per day. Another main operator is the regional and city bus company Verkehrsbetriebe Hamburg-Holstein (VHH), operating many own lines (especially in the outer districts and on outbound lines) and sharing services with the Hamburger Hochbahn (HHA) on some lines. Both companies handed over small parts of their services and some lines to subcontractors such as umbrella or Elite-Traffic and subsidiaries as KViP.

Since 2001, the HHA uses a passenger information system at several bus stops to inform the passengers.

Long distance bus lines start at the Hamburg Central Bus Station (German: Zentraler Omnibusbahnhof Hamburg ZOB). In 2007, there were more than 450 lines departing per week with travel destinations in 27 European countries, e.g. Denmark, Poland, and Russia.

==== Alternative propulsion of buses ====
Since 2003, Hamburg has deployed nine hydrogen fuel cell buses as part of a trial to access the long-term practically of hydrogen fuel cell vehicles. Those modified Mercedes-Benz Citaro buses were retired between 2008 and 2010. They were replaced in 2011 by four new hydrogen fuel cell buses, again being delivered by Mercedes-Benz.

In 2014 another 30 hybrid buses were delivered, including the 10 plug-in hybrid buses mentioned above and 15 articulated buses of the type Volvo 7900. At the same time two fuel cell powered Solaris Urbino 18 entered service. In 2016 three electric Solaris New Urbino of the new generation were added to the Hochbahn fleet.

At the same time the Verkehrsbetriebe Hamburg-Holstein (VHH) received 20 hybrid buses from Volvo and two fully electric buses from Italian manufacturer Rampini.

Together with the subsidiary companies 68 buses with alternative propulsion are in service in Hamburg in total. They e.g. run on the line 109 (Hamburger Hochbahn) - that was designated as a test line for alternative propulsion buses in 2014 - and on the line 48 (Verkehrsbetriebe Hamburg-Holstein). The goal of the city is to only order buses with alternative propulsion from 2020 on.

=== Ferries ===
The HADAG Seetouristik und Fährdienst runs public transport ferries, operating 21 ferries on 6 lines with a length of 27.6 km (17.1 mi).

=== Rapid transit and commuter rail ===
Rapid transit is provided by Hamburg U-Bahn and Hamburg S-Bahn and several commuter rail lines. In 2015, the system consists of a 930 km (580 mi) length, with 289 stations for the region. 1,969 vehicles were owned by ten operating companies: AKN Eisenbahn, DB Regio, Eisenbahnen und Verkehrsbetriebe Elbe-Weser (EVB), Erixx GmbH, Hamburg Hochbahn AG (HHA), metronom Eisenbahngesellschaft, nordbahn Eisenbahngesellschaft (NBE), Nord-Ostsee-Bahn (NOB) (part of Veolia Verkehr GmbH), S-Bahn Hamburg plc, and Verkehrsgesellschaft Norderstedt (VGN).

=== Taxis ===
Public transport with taxis is regulated by law. In 2008, according to the Hamburg Chamber of Commerce there were 2,168 companies with 3,675 vehicles, and more than 10,000 employees, in 80% of the companies the driver is also the owner of the company. In total 20 million transports were handled.

== Railways ==
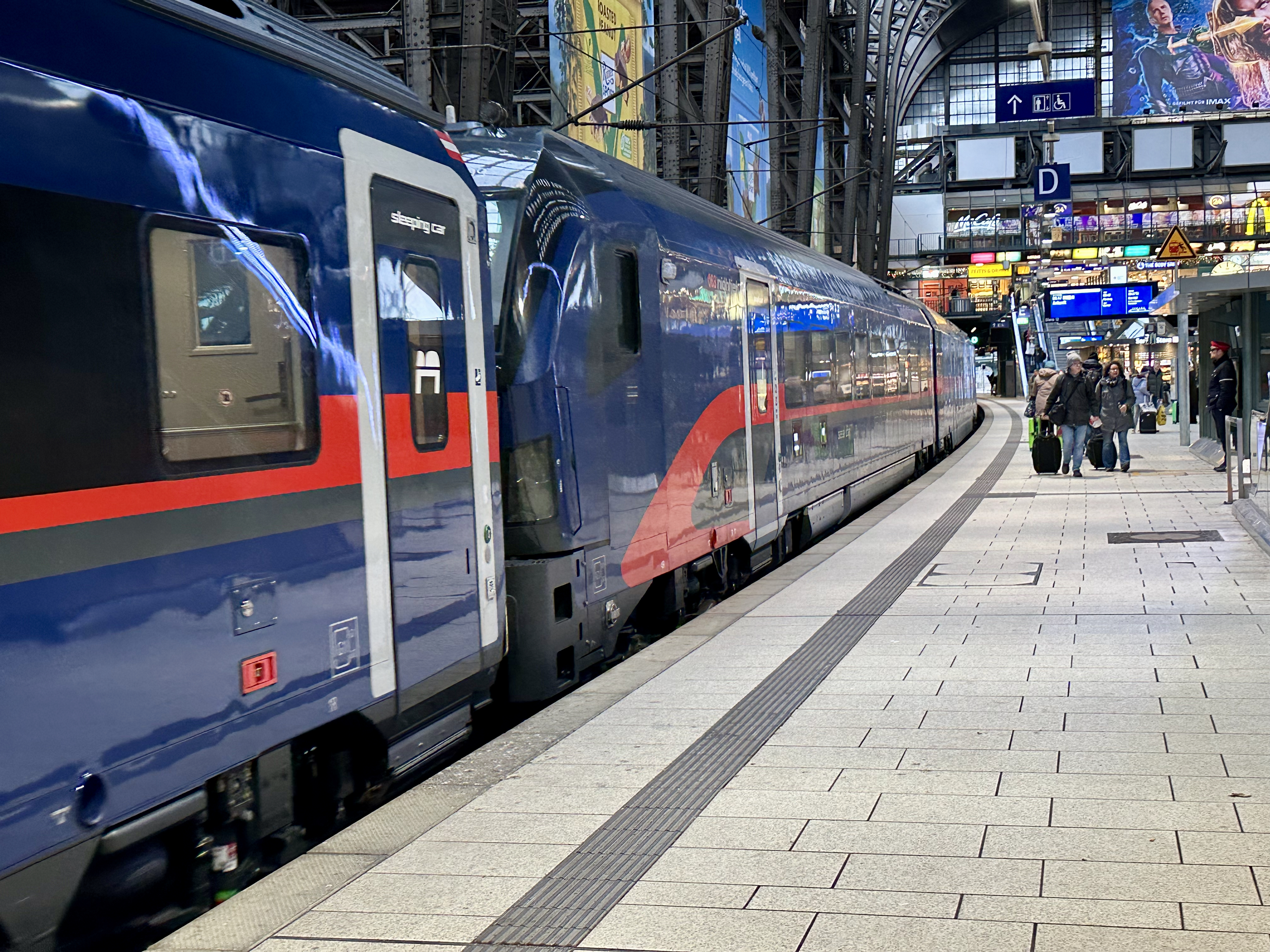
Nightjet trains at Hamburg Hauptbahnhof

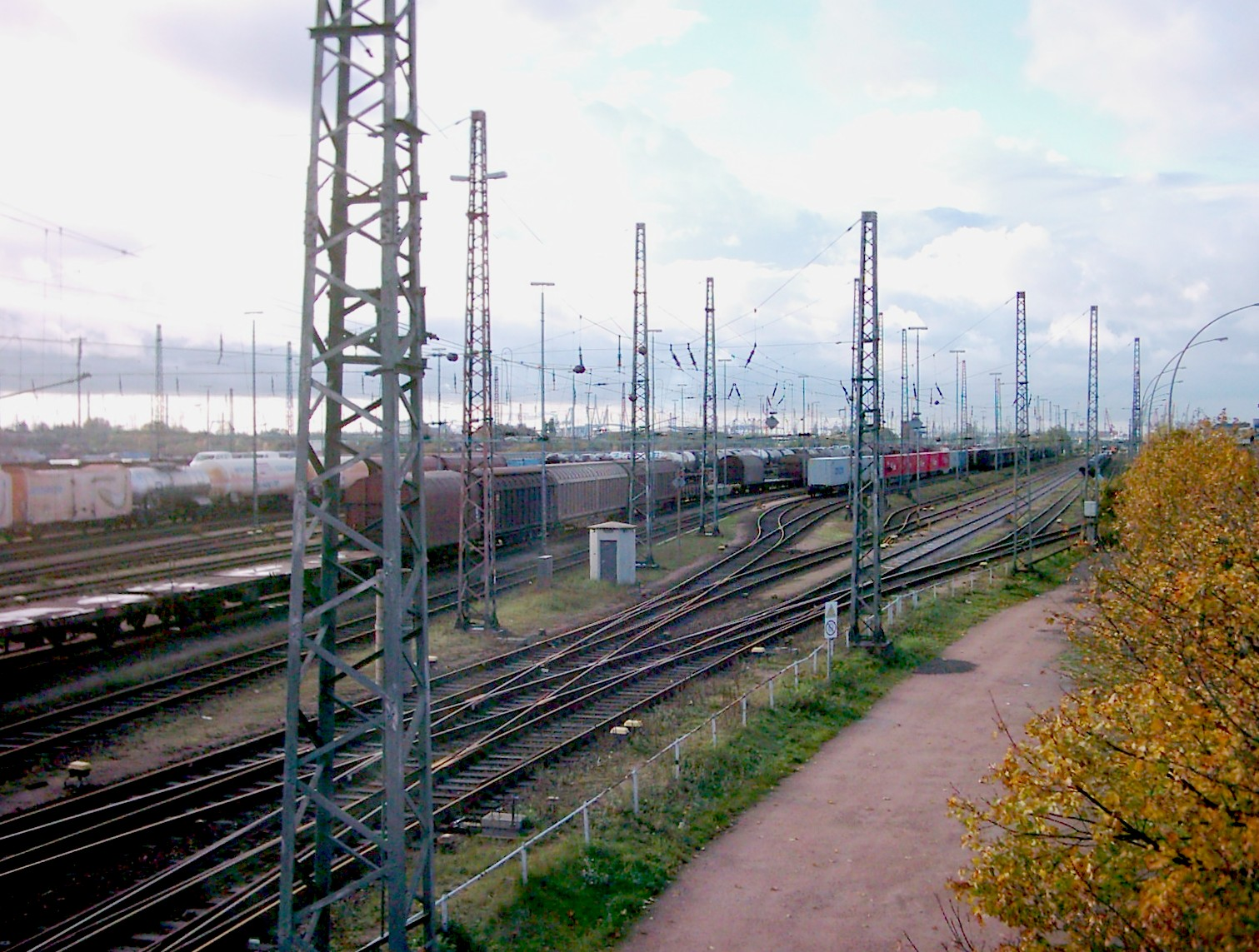
Port railway (Hafenbahn)

Hamburg is served by long distance and regional trains of Germany's major railway company Deutsche Bahn AG. The city's main railway station for longer-distance services is Hamburg Hauptbahnhof. There are permanent Intercity-Express lines to Berlin, Frankfurt am Main (continuing Stuttgart and Munich) and Bremen (continuing to the Ruhr area and Cologne). To the north, ICE trains connect Hamburg with Aarhus and Copenhagen in Denmark and Kiel in Schleswig-Holstein. There are also several InterCity- and EuroCity- passenger train connections. There are numerous Regional-Express and Regionalbahn services to Schleswig-Holstein and Lower Saxony. The major railway lines are Berlin–Hamburg Railway, Hanover – Hamburg, Lower Elbe Railway, and Wanne-Eickel – Hamburg.

In 2007, the port railway (German: Hafenbahn) had a freight transport volume of 39.7 mill t nearly, including around 1,801,600 container with at least 1,585,600 inbound and outbound coaches. In total, freight had a volume of more than 45,529 t (44,810 long tons; 50,187 short tons) (1000 t) in 2008, it increased 6.3% compared to 2007.

== Roads and streets ==
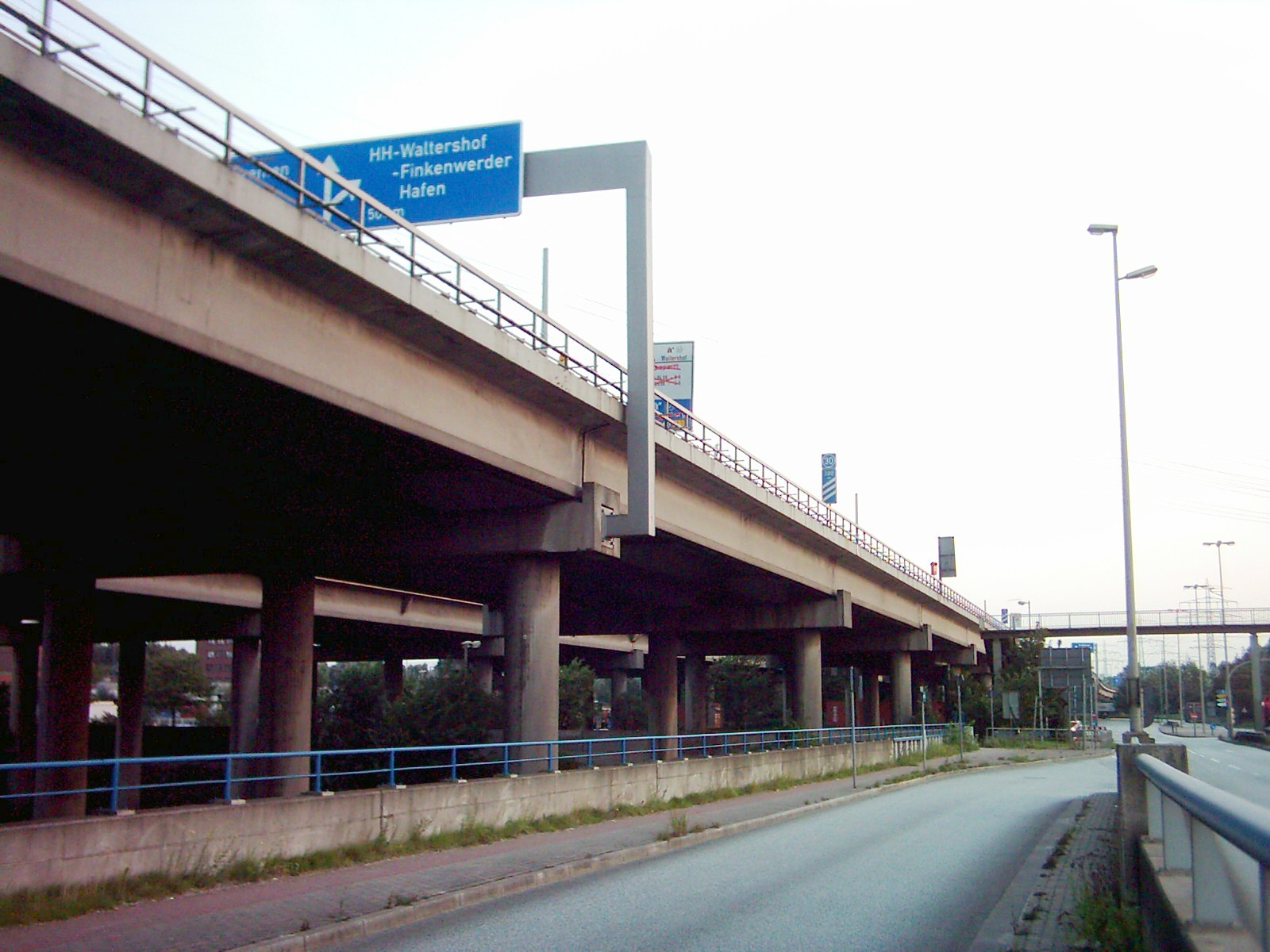
Elevated Bundesautobahn 7 near the exit Waltershof

As of 2008, Hamburg has 8,877 officially named streets, places, and—according to the (Behörde für Stadtentwicklung und Umwelt)—2,500 bridges. Some streets are well known like the Reeperbahn. Hamburg reduced the speed limit to 30 km/h (19 mph) in several streets.

According to the Department of Motor Vehicles (Kraftfahrt-Bundesamt), in Hamburg were 569,530 private cars registered (327 cars/1000 people) in 2007. There were 10,612 traffic accident in total, including 8,426 with injury to persons and 2,186 accidents with severe damage to property.

Several motorways (Autobahnen), and federal highways connect Hamburg with other regions or cities. An important motorway for the north-south connection in Europe is the A 7 — crossing the Elbe river with a tunnel — from the cities of Kiel and Flensburg in the North to Hanover in the south. The Bundesautobahn 1 connect Lübeck to Bremen, Münster, and Dortmund. The Bundesstraße 5 runs from the Danish border in the North to Frankfurt (Oder) in the East of Germany. In 2006, there were 80 km (50 mi) motorways and 120 km (75 mi) federal roads.

In November 2005, according to a census of the Federal Office for freight traffic (Bundesamt für Güterverkehr), in Hamburg were 926 commercial road haulage companies registered, with 19,985 vehicles (lorries, semitrailer tractors, truck trailers, semitrailers), and a cargo capacity of 188,724 t (185,743 long tons; 208,033 short tons), and 15,623 employees.

=== List of roads ===
Roads in Hamburg

Name	from (North)	to (South)	Notes
Bundesautobahn 1	Lübeck, Fehmarn, (Copenhagen DK)	Bremen, Münster, Dortmund	European route E22
Bundesautobahn 7	Kiel, Schleswig, Flensburg	Hanover, Kassel	European route E45
Bundesautobahn 23	Elmshorn, Itzehoe, Heide		
Bundesautobahn 24		Berlin	European route E26
Bundesautobahn 25		Geesthacht	
Bundesautobahn 26		Stade	under construction
Bundesautobahn 39		Winsen/Luhe, Lüneburg	not in Hamburg proper
Bundesautobahn 252			connecting A255 and B75
Bundesautobahn 253			
Bundesautobahn 255			connecting A1 and B4, B75
Bundesautobahn 261			connecting A1 and A7
Bundesstraße 4	Quickborn, Bad Bramstedt, Neumünster	Winsen/Luhe, Lüneburg, Uelzen	
Bundesstraße 5	Itzehoe, Marne, Meldorf, Husum, Danish border	Geesthacht, Lauenburg, Boizenburg	
Bundesstraße 73	Cuxhaven	Hamburg	
Bundesstraße 75	Bargteheide, Bad Oldesloe	Buchholz, Tostedt, Rotenburg/Wümme	
Bundesstraße 431	Wedel, Elmshorn, Glückstadt, St. Margarethen	Hamburg-Altona	
Bundesstraße 432	Norderstedt, Bad Segeberg, Scharbeutz	Hamburg-Schnelsen	
Bundesstraße 433	A7 in Hamburg-Schnelsen	Hamburg-Eppendorf	via Hamburg Airport
Bundesstraße 447	A7 in Hamburg-Schnelsen	Hamburg-Hoheluft	connecting B5 and A7

== Waterways ==
The port of Hamburg is situated in a distance of 110 kilometres from the mouth of the Elbe river, off the North Sea. In 2007, the port was the second-largest in Europe and ninth-largest worldwide. 9.8 million containers were handled in Hamburg in 2007, a ten percent increase on 2006. In 2008, inland water transport had a quantity of freight of 12,024 t (11,834 long tons; 13,254 short tons) (1000 t), and maritime shipping a quantity of 140,236 t (138,021 long tons; 154,584 short tons) (1000 t). Both increased compared to 2007.

The importance and responsibility of the port and its trade for the city is shown through the fact, that Hamburg is described itself as a Welthafenstadt (world port city) in the preamble of the constitution of Hamburg. Dieter Läpple described the important connection between the port and the trade city to enter it into the preamble of the constitution as follows: The preamble of the constitution of Hamburg points out the close relationship between port and city with regard to their development: „As an international port the Free and Hanseatic City of Hamburg has a special task, allocated by its history and location, toperform for the German people. In the spirit of peace it wants to be an intermediary between all continents and peoples of the world."

Important waterways were also – not in Hamburg proper – the canals Elbe Lateral Canal and Kiel Canal.

== See also ==
- Economy of Hamburg
- History of Hamburg
- Tourism in Hamburg
- Transport in Germany

== Notes ==
General

- "Statistisches Jahrbuch Hamburg 2008/2009", Statistisches Jahrbuch Hamburg (in German), Hamburg: Statistisches Amt für Hamburg und Schleswig-Holstein, 2008, ISSN 1614-8045
- Höltge, Dieter; Kochems, Michael (2008), Straßen- und Stadtbahnen in Deutschland, Band (in German), vol. 11: Hamburg, Freiburg: EisenbahnKurier, ISBN 978-3-88255-392-5
- Verg, Erich; Verg, Martin (2007), Das Abenteuer das Hamburg heißt (in German) (4th ed.), Hamburg: Ellert&Richter, ISBN 978-3-8319-0137-1
- Todt, Hartwig (2005), "Hamburg-Lexikon", Hamburg Lexikon (in German) (3 ed.), Ellert&Richter, ISBN 3-8319-0179-1.
