= Bundesautobahn 226 =

Federal motorway in Germany

A 226
- Bundesautobahn 226

Route information
- Length: 5 km (3.1 mi)

Location
- Country: Germany
- States: Schleswig-Holstein

Highway system
- Roads in Germany; Autobahns; List; Federal; List; State; E-roads

Bundesautobahn 226 (translates from German as Federal Motorway 226, short form Autobahn 226, abbreviated as BAB 226 or A 226) is an autobahn in Germany. It is a short branch of the A 1 north of Lübeck, sometimes called "Nordtangente Lübeck" ("Lübeck northern tangente"). It connects the A 1 with the Bundesstraße 75, which goes to the Lübeck borough of Travemünde.

== Exit List ==
State	District	Location	km	mi	Exit	Name	Destinations	Notes
Schleswig-Holstein	Lübeck	Kücknitz	0.0	0.0	1	Bad Schwartau interchange	A 1 / E47 – Fehmarn, Puttgarden, Sereetz, Bad Schwartau, Hamburg	incomplete 3-way interchange no ramps between Travemünde and Fehmarn Western End of motorway
Schleswig-Holstein	Lübeck	Kücknitz	2.0	1.2	2	Lübeck-Dänischburg	Lübeck-Dänischburg, Sereetz, Puttgarden ( A 1 / E47) (Westbound only), Neustadt in Holstein (Westbound only)	
Schleswig-Holstein	Lübeck	Kücknitz	5.2	3.2	3	Lübeck-Siems	B 75 – Lübeck-Travemünde, Skandinavienkai, Lübeck-Kücknitz; B 75 / B 104 – Lübeck-Siems, Lübeck-Herrenwyk, Lübeck-Schlutup (toll), Rostock (toll)), Schwerin (toll))	3-way interchange Eastern End of motorway Tolled destinations go through the Herren Tunnel
1.000 mi = 1.609 km; 1.000 km = 0.621 mi: Incomplete access
