= Bundesstraße 431 =

Federal highway in Germany

B 431
- Bundesstraße 431
- Route of Bundesstraße 431

Major junctions
- Northwest end: Meldorf
- Southeast end: Altona borough of Hamburg

Location
- Country: Germany
- States: Schleswig-Holstein, Hamburg

Highway system
- Roads in Germany; Autobahns; List; Federal; List; State; E-roads

The Bundesstraße 431 (or B 431) is a German federal main road running in a northwest to southeast direction from Meldorf to the Altona borough of Hamburg.

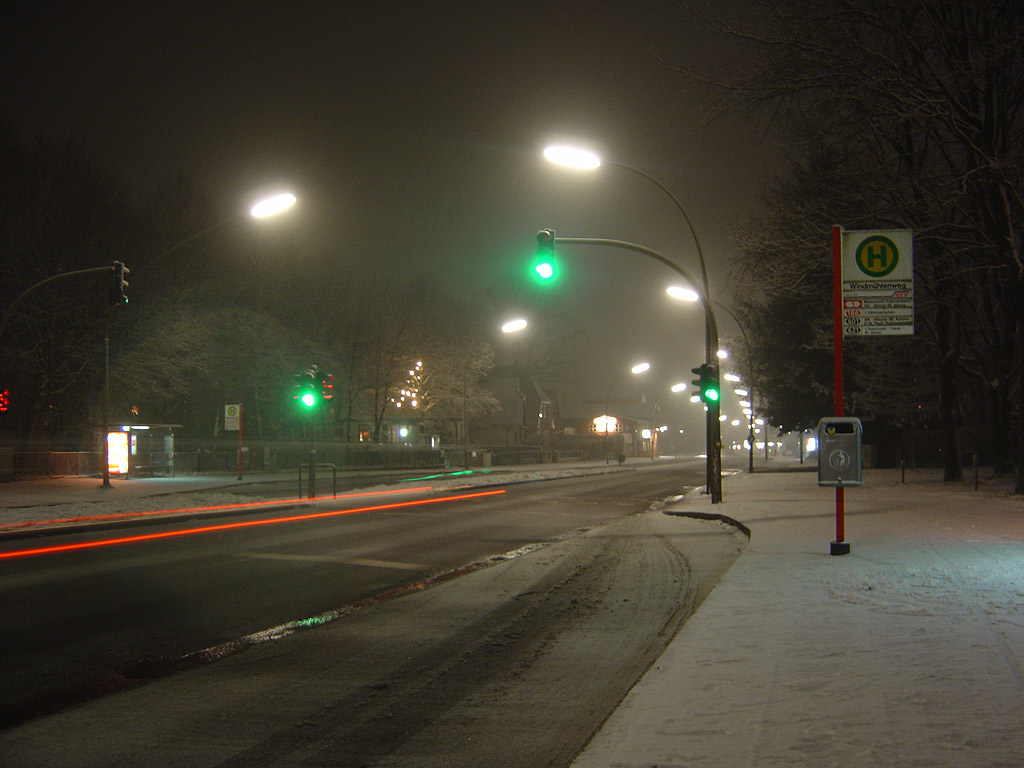
B431 in Groß Flottbek, Hamburg

== Junction lists ==
Legend:

- I/C - Interchange, I/S - Intersection, RSA - Rest and service area, OBR - Overhead bridge restaurant, R/R - Restaurant and rest plaza, L/B - Layby, V/P - Vista point, TN - tunnel, T/P - Toll plaza, BR - Bridge
- C - Cloverleaf, S - Stack, T-A - Trumpet-A, T-B - Trumpet-B, DT - Directional-T/Y, SDT - Semi-Directional-T/Y, P-Y - Partial-Y, D - Diamond, P-C - Partial cloverleaf, D-D - Diverging diamond, D-R - Direct ramp

(4)	Albersdorf A 23
	Nindorf
	Meldorf B 5
	Landscheide B 5
	Sankt Margarethen
	Brokdorf
	Glückstadt B 495
	Glückstadt (planned) A 20
	Elmshorn
	Klein Nordende
	Uetersen
	Heist
	Holm
	Wedel
	Iserbrook in Hamburg
(28)	Bahrenfeld in Hamburg A 7

== See also ==
- Transport in Hamburg
