= Elise Augustat =

German politician (1889–1940)

- Born: Elise Queck; 20 July 1889; Waldkeim, East Prussia, German Empire
- Died: 13 March 1940 (aged 50); Lägerdorf, Schleswig-Holstein, Nazi Germany
- Occupation: Politician
- Political party: SPD; USPD; KPD
- Spouses: Friedrich Buchholz (m. 1909) Wilhelm Augustat (m. 1921)
- Children: Gertrud, Elfriede
- Parent(s): Auguste and Karl Queck

Elise Augustat (née Queck; 20 July 1889 – 13 March 1940) was a German politician (KPD) who served as a member of the national parliament (Reichstag) between 1930 and 1933.

== Life ==
Elise Queck was born in Waldheim (now part of Bagrationovsky District) in East Prussia, which at that time was part of German Empire. She came from a family of agricultural workers. Her parents, Auguste and Karl Queck, had eight recorded children. Soon after Elise's birth the family relocated to Lägerdorf near Itzehoe, a booming centre of chalk mining and cement production in Schleswig-Holstein. Her father died when she was eight.

After leaving middle school at the age of fourteen she worked on the land and in domestic service, at some stage relocating temporarily to nearby Hamburg. She married Friedrich Buchholz in 1909, after which she is described in sources as a housewife. By the time of her marriage her first child, Gertrud, had been born. Her second daughter, Elfriede, was born soon after 1909, but the marriage nevertheless broke apart and she spent the war years in circumstances of considerable hardship as a divorced single mother. For some of the period she was employed at the huge Lägerdorf cement factory.

In 1916 she joined the Social Democratic Party (Sozialdemokratische Partei Deutschlands / SPD). The decision of the SPD leadership back in 1914 to support funding for the war had not been universally supported within the party, and became more contentious as the slaughter on the frontline and destitution at home grew. In 1917 the party split apart, primarily over the issue of support for the war, and Elise Augustat moved over with breakaway faction, which became known as the Independent Social Democratic Party (Unabhängige Sozialdemokratische Partei Deutschlands / USPD). When the USPD itself split three years later she was part of the majority that made up the newly created German Communist Party. It was around this time that she married a fellow communist party activist, Wilhelm Augustat.

Although the street violence of the postwar revolution was at its fiercest in the big cities, the little industrial town of Lägerdorf was not spared entirely. Following a violent incident in which a policeman and two civilians were killed, Elise Augustat was arrested, and faced criminal charges for breach of the peace. However, the court acquitted her on all charges.

As revolution gave way to acute austerity, in 1923 she became a member of the Action Committee at the Lägerdorf branch of the recently merged Federation of German Trade Unions (Allgemeiner Deutsche Gewerkschaftsbund / ADGB). From 1924 she was also representing the Communist Party on the Lägerdorf district council, retaining this position till 1931.

In November 1926 she was a delegate at the first national congress of the Roten Frauen- und Mädchenbundes (RFMB), the female section of a quasi-military wing of the Communist Party. In 1929 she joined the party's regional leadership team (Bezirksleitung) for Wasserkante, the region covering Hamburg and Schleswig-Holstein, within which she headed up the women's section. Her department was primarily concerned with equal pay for women and with promoting changes to Section 218, of the Criminal Code, a very restrictive abortion law. In the same year she was elected as a member of the Schleswig-Holstein provincial parliament. She move to Hamburg in 1930, where the regional party leadership was based.

In the 1930 general election she was elected to the national parliament (Reichstag) where she sat as one of the 77 Communist Party members, representing a Hamburg voting district (Wahlkreis 34). She remained a member till democracy was terminated during the first part of 1933. In 1931–32 she was sent for training to the Soviet Union. Having returned late in 1932, with the political situation becoming increasingly threatening, she was already preparing, with party comrades, for a possible future ban on the party. In January 1933 the backdrop indeed changed dramatically when Nazis took power and converted Germany into a one-party dictatorship. Work for the Communist Party was now illegal.

A large number of communists went into hiding, while the Hitler government set about rounding up all the communist members of the former national parliament (Reichstag). In March 1933 Augustat moved to a new address (still in Hamburg), possibly in order to conceal her presence in the city. Two months after that, in May 1933, she was arrested following a denunciation in nearby Itzehoe, from where she was taken into investigative custody back in Hamburg. The criminal case against her had already been opened, in absentia, on 20 April 1933. The charge was "Preparation of High Treason" (Vorbereitung zum Hochverrat). Nevertheless, the charges were formally laid only in December 1933 and her trial concluded on 15 January 1934. Despite the lengthy pretrial detention period, the trial itself, held at the Hamburg Regional High Court ended in an acquittal, suggesting a lack of compelling evidence in support of the prosecution case.

After her release Elise and Wilhelm Augustat went back to Lägerdorf. Their communist credentials meant that they were unable to find a job, and for income they depended on what Elise could earn as a lodging house keeper. Politically they were closely supervised by the local Nazi leadership, and forced to participate in Nazi party meetings and to give the Hitler salute to party leaders. In April 1939, a few months before the outbreak of war, Wilhelm Augustat, despite being well over 25, was conscripted for State Labour Service and sent to the Eifel region for work on construction of the Siegfried Line frontier defences. During the summer of 1939 Elise was able to visit him and the two of them had a four-week holiday in the frontier region north of Bitburg. Shortly after her return to Lägerdorf war resumed, and in September, along with others deemed "politically unreliable", Elise Augustat was arrested during September. On 23 September 1939 she was delivered to the Ravensbrück concentration camp.

In December 1939 her detention was "suspended", probably because she was by this time gravely ill, and she was permitted to undertake a Probeurlaub (experimental holiday)) back in her home town. Her husband had also been allowed home for Christmas, and she was able report to him and to a small circle of close friends about the dire conditions at Ravensbrück, announcing that she would rather commit suicide than return to that camp. Evidently her shattered health was not improved by her being allowed home, and she died at Lägerdorf on 13 March 1940. Statements made by survivors after the war ended five years later indicate that the immediate cause of her death was pneumonia. Other sources and memorials simply state that she died as a consequence of her detention (in the concentration camp).
