= Karl-Liebknecht-Straße =

Major street in the Berlin Mitte district

- Karl-Liebknecht-Strasse
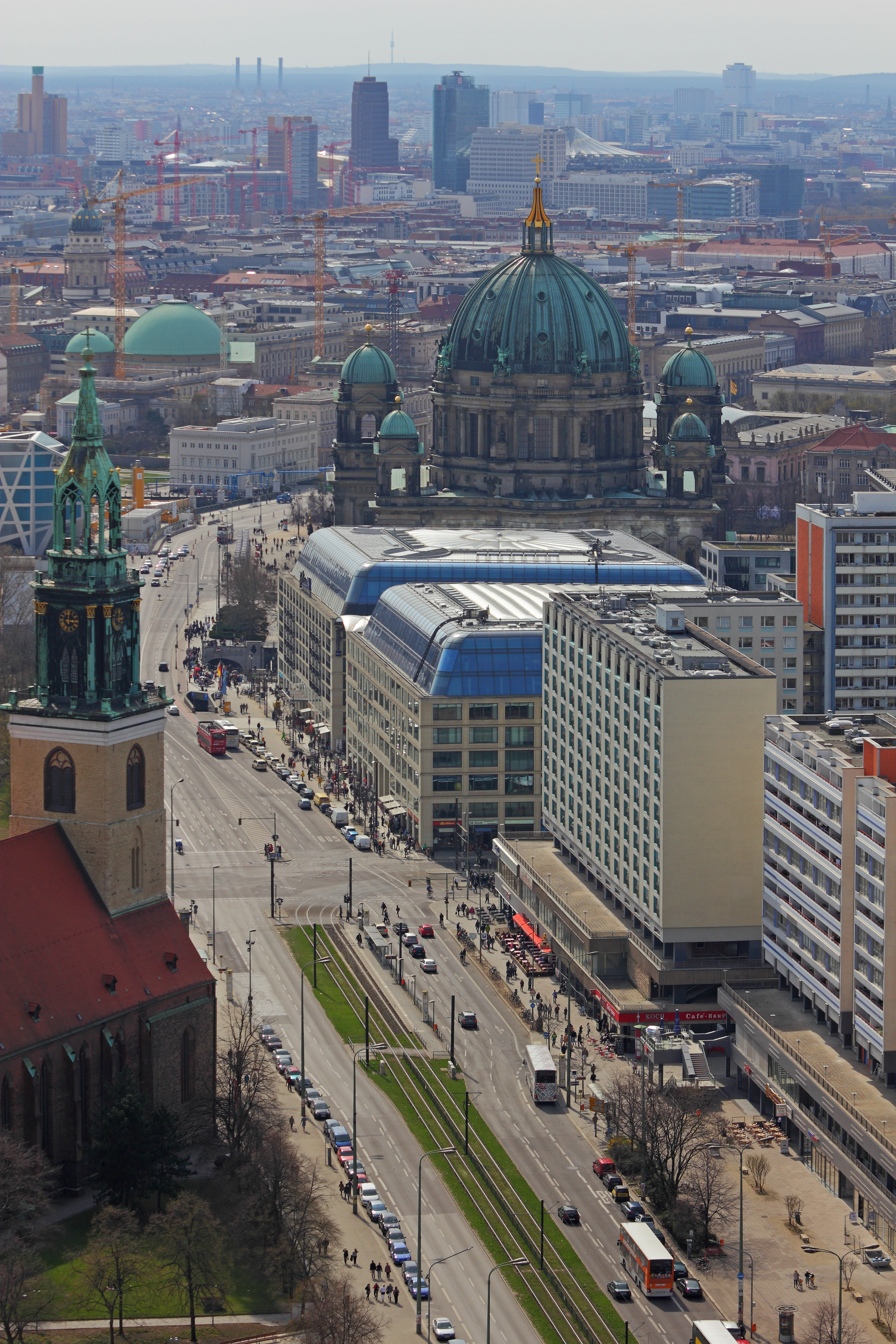
- Karl-Liebknecht-Straße, view from Park Inn
- Interactive map of Karl-Liebknecht-Straße
- Former name: See 'History' section
- Part of: Bundesstraße 2; Bundesstraße 5
- Namesake: Karl Liebknecht
- Type: Street
- Length: 1.3 km (0.81 mi)
- Location: Berlin, Germany
- Quarter: Mitte
- Nearest metro station: Museumsinsel; Alexanderplatz
- Coordinates: 52°31′19″N 13°24′31″E
- Southwest end: Unter den Linden; Schlossbrücke; Schloßplatz; Liebknecht Bridge
- Major junctions: Spandauer Straße; Dircksenstraße; Memhardstraße; Alexanderstraße; Hirtenstraße
- Northeast end: Torstraße; Mollstraße; Prenzlauer Allee

Construction
- Inauguration: 1887

Karl-Liebknecht-Straße, or Karl-Liebknecht-Strasse (see ß), is a major street in the central Mitte district of the German capital Berlin. It is named after Karl Liebknecht (1871–1919), one of the founders of the Communist Party of Germany. The street connects the Unter den Linden boulevard with the Prenzlauer Allee arterial road leading to the northern city limits. Although part of the street dates back to medieval times, most of the buildings at its side were built in the 1960s, when East Berlin's centre was redesigned as the capital of East Germany.

== History ==
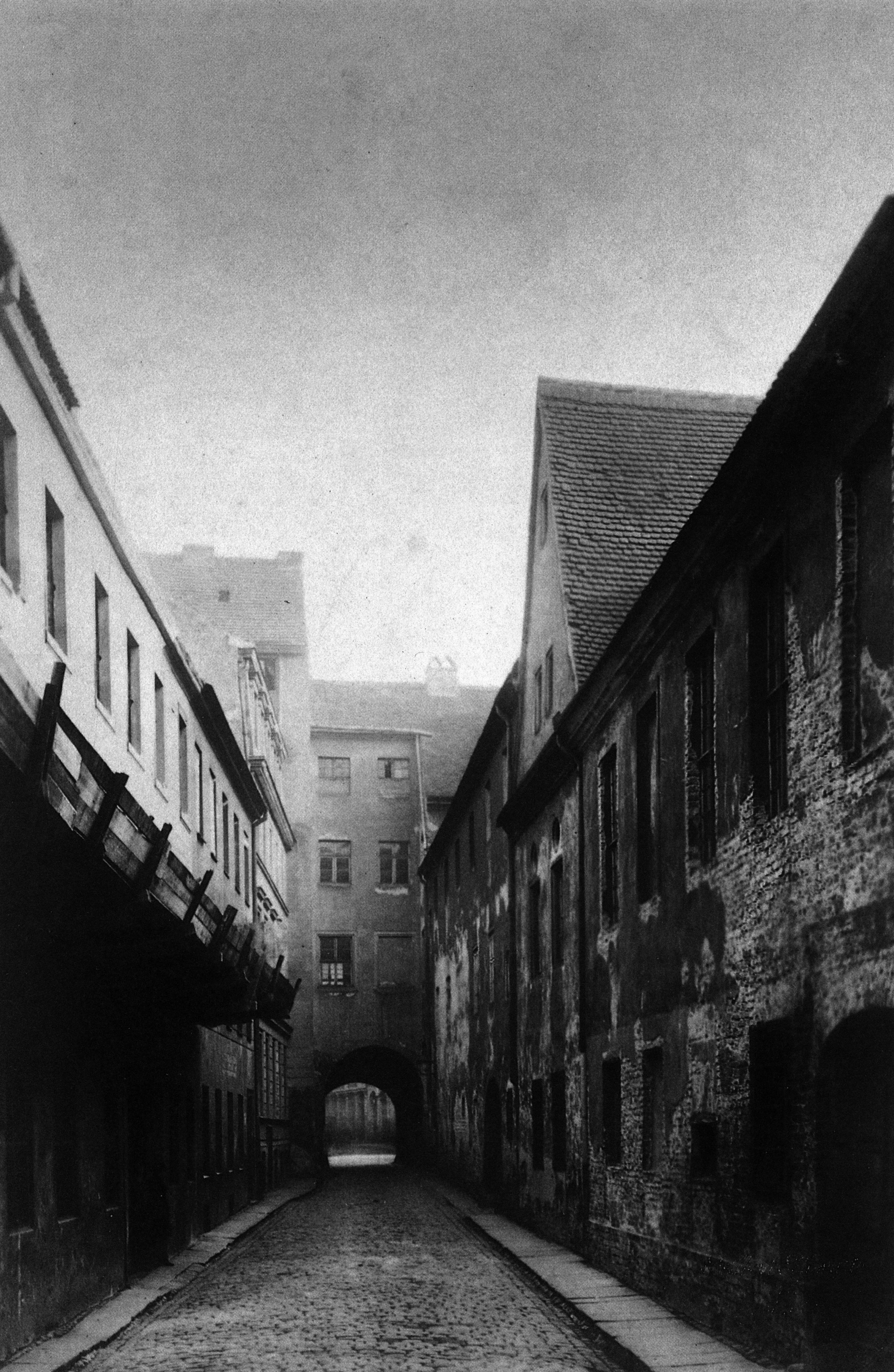
Kleine Burgstraße, 1875

The origins of the street lie in the quarter that arose about 1270 around St. Mary's Church, located north of Alt-Berlin's initial settlement. The "New Market" (Neuer Markt) square beneath the church was first mentioned in a 1292 deed; there were three alleys that went southwest from it down to the Spree river. They had had different names over the centuries and were ultimately known as Papenstraße (“Bishops' Street”, named for the Berlin residence of the Havelberg bishops), Brauhausstraße (“Brewery Street”) and Kleine Burgstraße (“Castle Street”, named for the Berlin Palace on the other side of the river).

Since the 17th century, a wooden pedestrian bridge, known as Castle Bridge, later called Cavalier Bridge or Sechserbrücke (“Sixpence Bridge”), would lead from Kleine Burgstraße across the water to the Berlin Palace on Spree Island and the eastern terminus of Unter den Linden. However, traffic from the west crossing Schlossbrücke still had to turn right in front of the Palace and continue its way to Alt-Berlin via the parallel Rathaus Bridge.

In the 1880s, plans for a new traffic routing were developed when it was decided to build a northeastern extension of the Unter den Linden boulevard through the Palace's Lustgarten. In 1884 the German Emperor William I gave his consent to replace the pedestrian bridge with a much larger, richly ornamented stone construction. Beyond the river, after lengthy negotiations with numerous property owners, the three historic alleys were combined to a broad street, built according to plans designed by August Orth, to complete the interconnection from Unter den Linden to the New Market square.

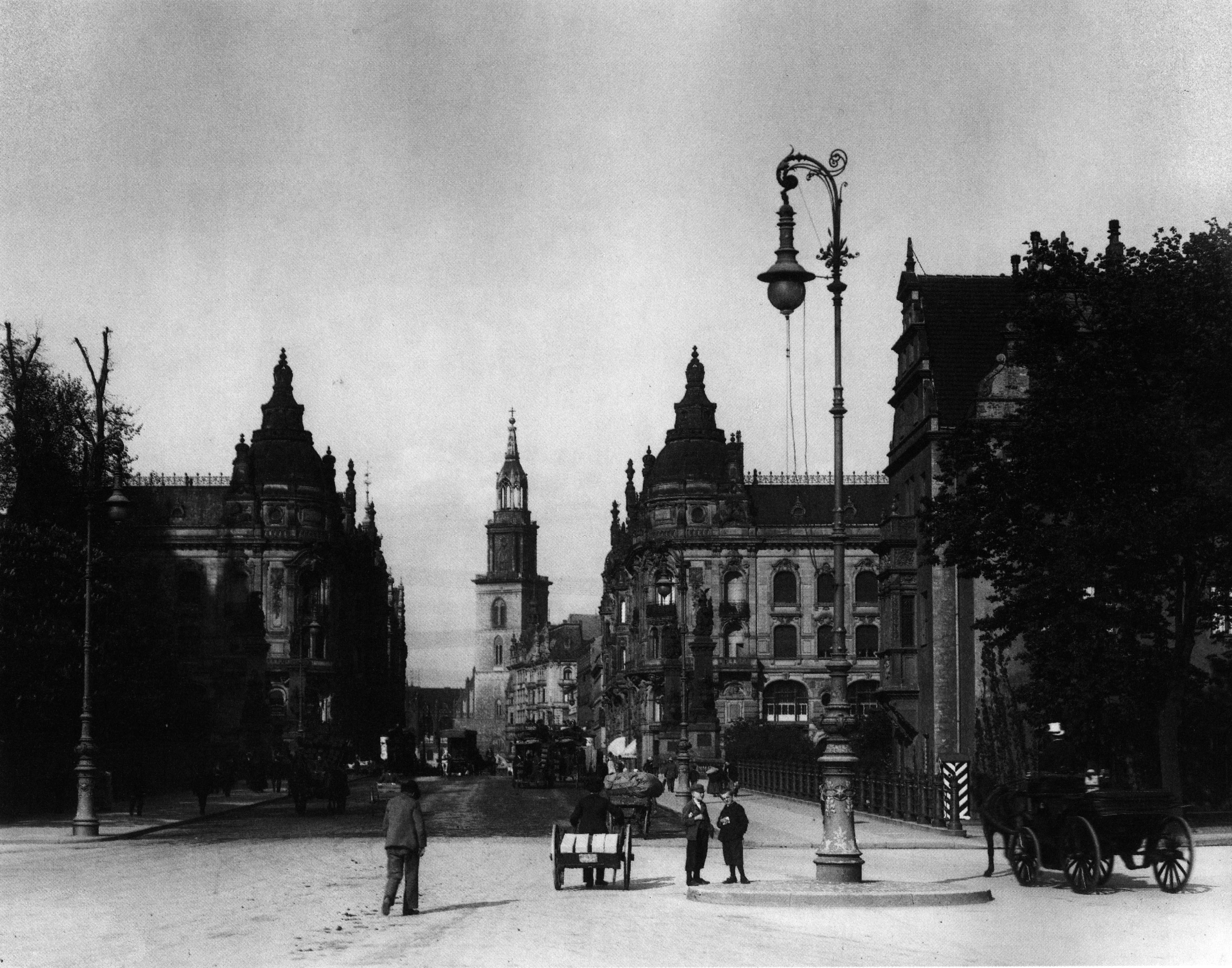
Kaiser-Wilhelm-Straße, view to St. Mary's Church, 1899

Opened in 1887, this new street was named Kaiser-Wilhelm-Straße in honour of the emperor. The road then led from Spree Island across the new Kaiser-Wilhelm-Brücke through Alt-Berlin, turning slightly north at St. Mary's Church, pass under the Stadtbahn tracks and ending at Münzstraße in the adjacent Scheunenviertel (“Barns' Quarter”) neighbourhood. In 1892 the street was extended to Hirtenstraße near modern Rosa-Luxemburg-Platz.

During the Nazi era, demolition of the Kaiser-Wilhelm-Brücke began in March 1939 to make room for the Welthauptstadt Germania plans developed by Albert Speer; nevertheless, works ceased shortly after the outbreak of World War II in September. Most of the buildings on Kaiser-Wilhelm-Straße were largely damaged and several lost completely in the British and American air raids on the city between 1943 and 1945. During the final Battle of Berlin in April 1945, German Wehrmacht troops blew up the remnants of the Kaiser-Wilhelm-Brücke in an attempt to hold back the Red Army advance.

After the war, the street became part of the Soviet-occupied sector of Berlin. The Soviet Military Administration had it renamed Liebknechtstraße in 1947 for Karl Liebknecht, co-founder of the German Communist Party. Liebknecht had his lawyer's office nearby and during the German Revolution of 1918–19 had proclaimed a "Free Socialist Republic" at the Berlin Palace on 9 November 1918, shortly before he was murdered by Freikorps paramilitaries. The bridge to Spree Island was rebuilt in a simple form in 1949–50 and named Liebknecht Bridge.

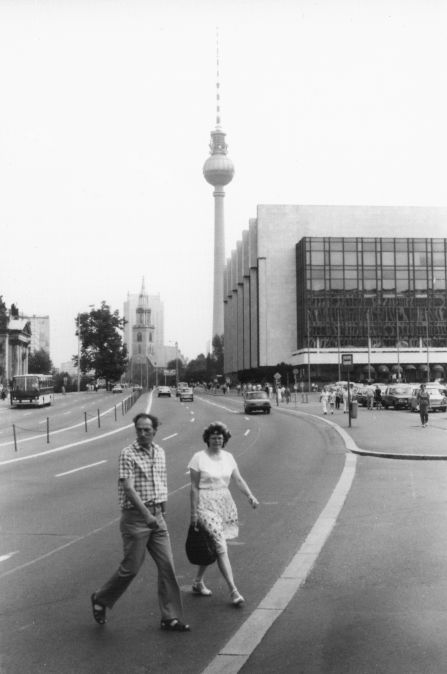
Karl-Liebknecht-Straße and Palace of the Republic, 1989

However, the lost buildings were only replaced in the 1960s when the East German Socialist Unity Party and the Council of Ministers decided to rebuild the area to fit the government's visions of a modern socialist city. The new broad Karl-Liebknecht-Straße started on Spree Island at the Marx-Engels-Platz, between Berlin Cathedral and the Palace of the Republic inaugurated in 1976. On the other side of the Liebknecht Bridge, large Plattenbau apartment blocks were built along the street, while the right side became a large open green, stretching from the Marx-Engels-Forum to the foot of the Fernsehturm (TV tower). Instead of turning north at St. Mary's Church, the new Karl-Liebknecht-Straße, finished in 1969, now goes straight ahead, bypassing Alexanderplatz to meet the arterial road Prenzlauer Allee at the site of the former city gate (Prenzlauer Tor). The former northeastern section of the street, beyond the church, is today known as Rosa-Luxemburg-Straße – named after Rosa Luxemburg, another co-founder of the Communist Party who was likewise killed in 1919.

Unlike its surroundings, Karl-Liebknecht-Straße has not changed its look too much since the German reunification in 1990. However, the former Palasthotel near the Liebknecht Bridge has been demolished in 2001 and replaced by the large DomAquarée hotel and office building complex, comprising the DDR Museum (as well as the Sea Life Centre Berlin and AquaDom aquarium until the latter's collapse in 2022). The adjacent apartment blocks and the row of shops below have been steadily refurbished. Plans for the reconstruction of the neighbourhood north of Alexanderplatz have been made.

Name changes
16th century	Spreegäßlein	Zimmermannsgasse	Am Kramhause	Hinter der Badstube
17th century	Wasserstraße	Bolingsgasse	Papenstraße	Heinersdorfer Straße
18th century	Kleine Burgstraße	Klandersgasse	Papenstraße	Prenzlauer Straße
19th century	Kleine Burgstraße	Brauhausstraße	Papenstraße	Prenzlauer Straße
1887	Kaiser-Wilhelm-Straße			Prenzlauer Straße
July 31, 1947	Liebknechtstraße			Prenzlauer Straße
September 3, 1969	Karl-Liebknecht-Straße + Rosa-Luxemburg-Straße

== Route description ==
Karl-Liebknecht-Straße starts at the Schloßbrücke (“palace bridge”) on Spree Island as part of the German federal highways B 2 and B 5. On the left lies the Lustgarten, while on the right is the Schloßplatz, the name of which refers to the old Baroque style Berliner Schloss (English: Berlin Palace). After being demolished by authorities in East Germany following the Second World War, the DDR-era Palast der Republik was built here in 1976, until it was demolished in 2008 following the Bundestag's decision to rebuild the historically renowned palace. The street runs northeast, crosses the Liebknechtbrücke, leaving Spree Island, and meets Spandauer Straße, where the Bundesstraßen turn to the right. Karl-Liebknecht-Straße continues northeast, passing the Fernsehturm and Alexanderplatz through the old Königsstadt quarter to the border of Mitte borough. There, at the place of the old Prenzlauer Tor (“Prenzlau gate”) it crosses Torstraße and Mollstraße and continues as Prenzlauer Allee to the north of the city.

== Buildings ==
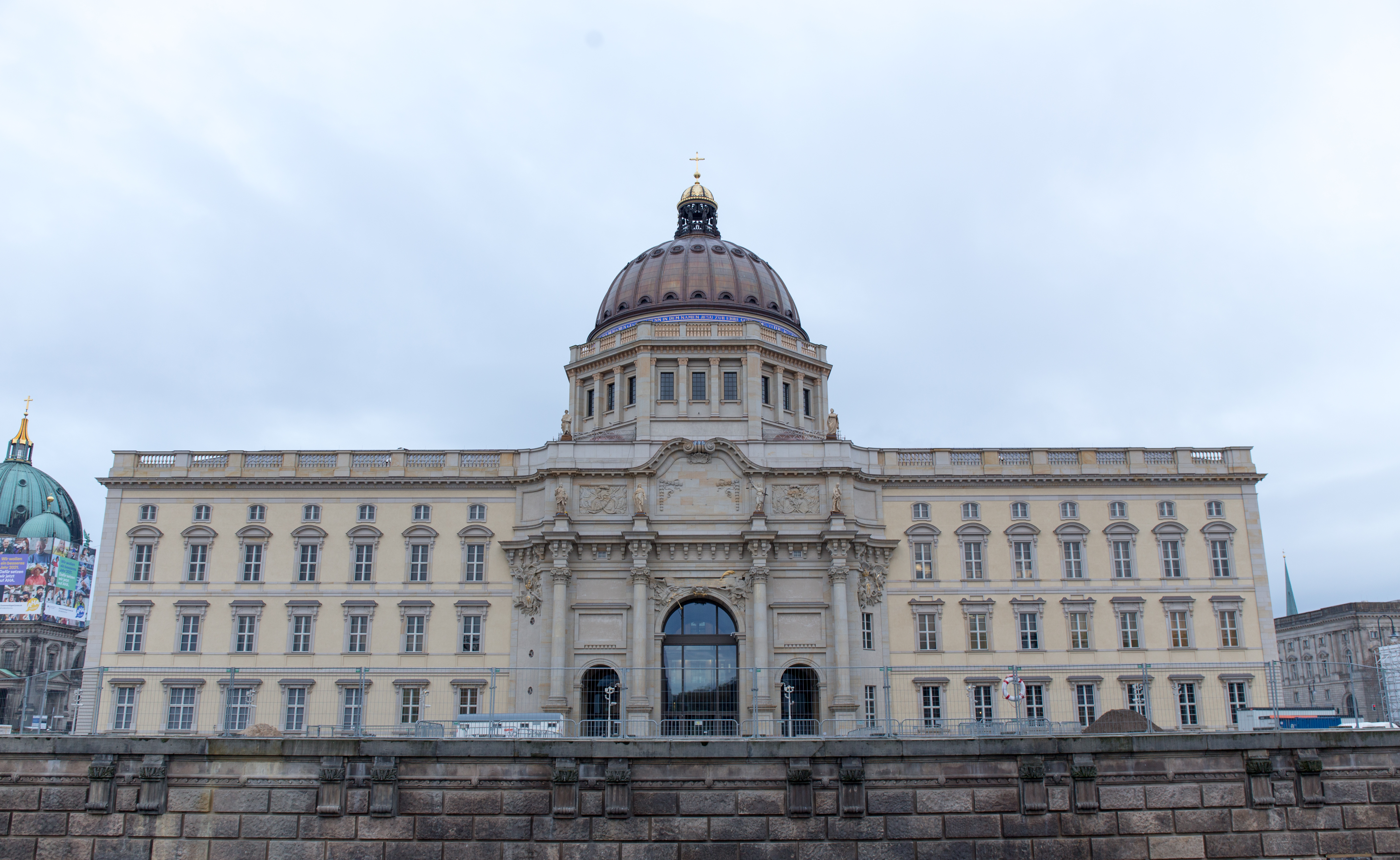
Berlin Palace

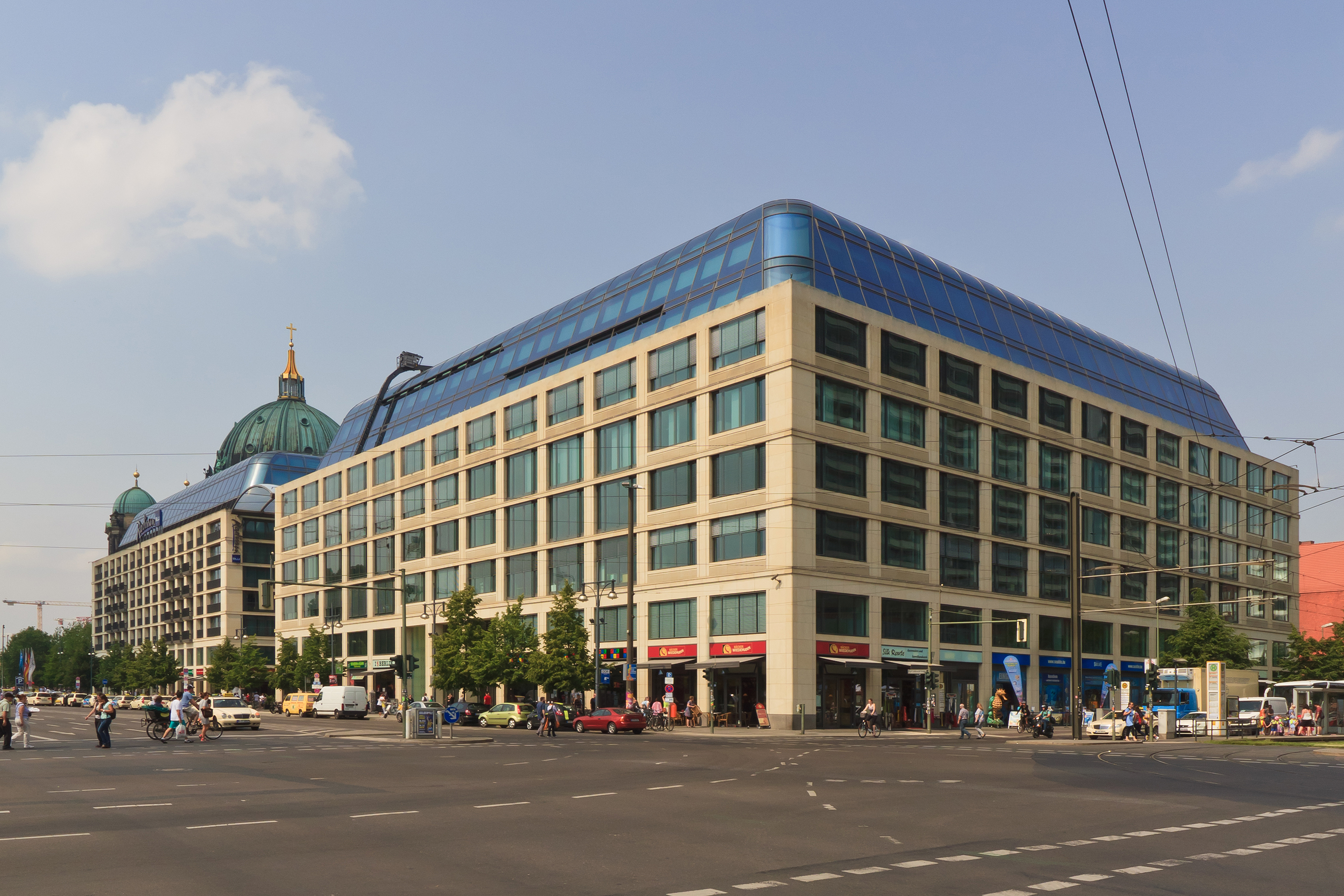
DomAquarée

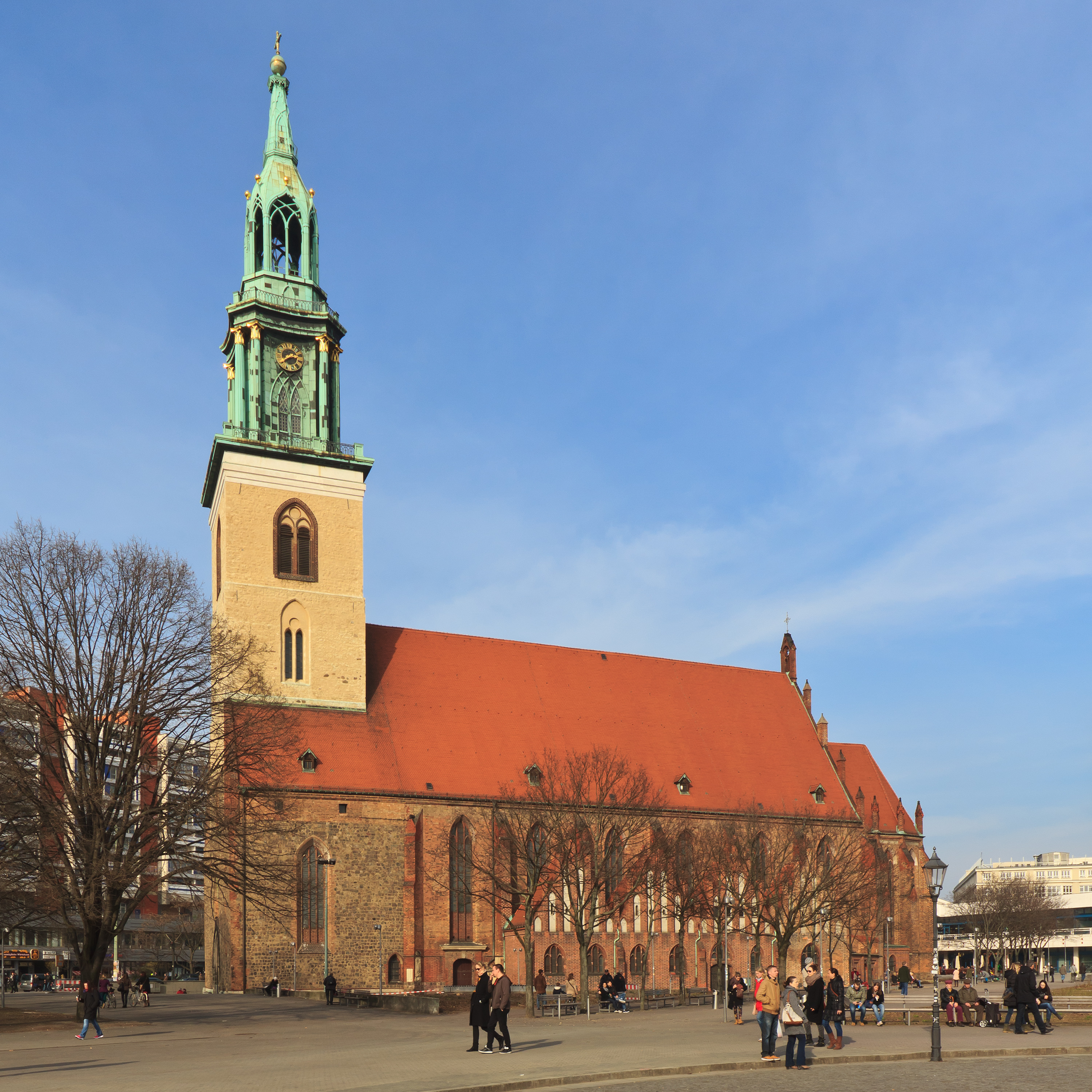
St. Mary's Church

At its start, Karl-Liebknecht-Straße passes by two of the most prominent sites of Berlin, the evangelical Berlin Cathedral (Am Lustgarten 1) and the Berlin Palace (home of the Humboldt Forum).

=== Numbers 1 to 5 – DomAquarée ===
The numbers 1, 3, and 5 belong to the DomAquarée building, completed in 2003. It houses several restaurants and shops as well as the Radisson Blu Hotel Berlin and the GDR museum. It also housed the Sea Life Centre with the AquaDom aquarium until the latter's collapse in 2022.

=== Number 8 – St. Mary's Church ===
At no. 8, there is the St. Mary's Church (St. Marienkirche), the second-oldest church in the centre of Berlin and the oldest one still in use. It was first mentioned in 1292 as the church of Berlin's “new town”, right in front of the New Marketplace. Nowadays, St. Mary's is one of three churches of the Evangelical St. Mary's & St. Peter's parish, which has around 3,100 members.

=== Number 13 – Berlin Carré ===
Number 13, the northernmost part of a Plattenbau apartment block, holds the Berlin Carré, a shopping mall of about 7,600 square metres (1.9 acres), which was built in 1969 to replace the Zentralmarkthalle (“central market hall”) at the same place. In 2000, the cabaret theatre Sündikat (“sindicate”) also found a home in this building.

=== Number 29 – Pressehaus am Alexanderplatz ===
Number 29 is known as Pressehaus am Alexanderplatz, home of the Berliner Verlag, which publishes the popular Berliner Zeitung daily newspaper. The building also houses the Berliner Journalistenschule (“Berlin journalists school”), a college for the further education of journalists, which has its own radio and TV station.

=== Former buildings ===
World War II and the subsequent reconstruction of East Berlin as the capital of the German Democratic Republic meant the end for several of Berlin's important and well-known buildings. The most prominent of course being the Berliner Schloss (“Berlin Palace”). It was first built as a castle as early as 1443 under Frederick II, Elector of Brandenburg. It was largely rebuilt as a palace a hundred years later and became the family seat of the House of Hohenzollern, rulers of the Kingdom of Prussia and later of the German Empire. The building was demolished in 1950 on the order of the East German government. It was replaced by the Palast der Republik, which was demolished from 2006 until 2008, after the removal of asbestos.

Another well-known building was the elite school Joachimsthalsches Gymnasium, which had moved to the premises of the modern DomAquarée in 1650, after its old building in Joachimsthal had been destroyed in the Thirty Years' War. The school moved out of the building in 1880.

In 1886 the Zentralmarkthalle (“central market hall”) opened in two buildings left and right of the street, right at the railway tracks. It was built to replace the weekly markets at the Neuer Markt (“new marketplace”) at the foot of the St. Mary's Church, which had taken place for several centuries. The market hall survived the war, but was demolished in 1969 to make room for the current buildings.

Another part of East Berlin's reconstruction program was the five-star Palasthotel (“palace hotel”) at Liebknechtbrücke. It was built between 1976 and 1979, based on a design by Ferenc Kiss. The hotel had 600 rooms with 1,000 beds and a conference hall with about 2,000 seats. It was closed for all East German guests, as one had to pay in a hard currency instead of the local East German mark. In 1992, the hotel was taken over by the Radisson group. It was demolished in 2000 to make room for the new DomAquarée, which was opened in 2003.

== Public transport ==
Karl-Liebknecht-Straße is serviced by five BVG bus lines with stops at Memhardstraße, Fernsehturm, St. Mary's Church and at Lustgarten. The lines are 100 between Alexanderplatz and Zoologischer Garten, 200 between Michelangelostraße and Zoologischer Garten, 248 between Alexanderplatz and Südkreuz, M48 between Alexanderplatz and Busseallee in Zehlendorf and the express bus TXL to Berlin-Tegel International Airport. The northern part of the street is also serviced by the tram line M2 with stops at Mollstraße and Memhardstraße. M2 connects Alexanderplatz and Heinersdorf (Pankow borough).
