= Rellingen =

- Municipality
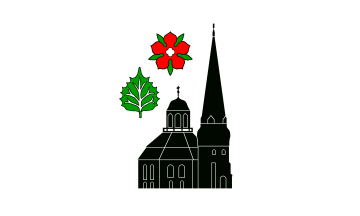
- Flag Coat of arms

- Location of Rellingen within Pinneberg district
- Interactive map of Rellingen
- Location within Germany Location within Schleswig-Holstein
- Coordinates: 53°39′N 9°49′E
- Country: Germany
- State: Schleswig-Holstein
- District: Pinneberg
- Subdivisions: 3

Government
  - Mayor: Anja Radtke

Area
  - Total: 13.18 km^{2} (5.09 sq mi)
- Elevation: 5–15 m (16–49 ft)

Population (2025-12-31)
  - Total: 15,135
  - Density: 1,148/km^{2} (2,974/sq mi)
- Time zone: UTC+01:00 (CET)
  - Summer (DST): UTC+02:00 (CEST)
- Postal codes: 25462
- Dialling codes: 04101
- Vehicle registration: PI
- Website: www.rellingen.de

Rellingen (German pronunciation: [ˈʁɛlɪŋən]) is a municipality in the district of Pinneberg, in Schleswig-Holstein, Germany. It is situated approximately 7 km east of Pinneberg, and 10 km northwest of Hamburg. Population as of December 31, 2007 is 13,746. The total land is 13.19 km^{2}.

Rellingen was formerly part of the Duchy of Holstein, a subject of the Danish Crown.

== Transportation ==
Rellingen can be reached from Bundesautobahn 23. The Hamburg S-Bahn (line 3) and bus system (lines 185, 195, 295 and 395) are also connected to Rellingen.

== Architecture ==
Rellingen is famous for its Lutheran church. The architect was Cai Dose. The previous church building was damaged badly during the Thirty Years War. It was rebuilt between 1754 and 1756 and was extended. The church has an octagonal shape and has a church tower which is leaning to one side.

== Economy ==
The municipality of Pinneberg including Rellingen is famous for its tree nurseries. Other industries are manufacturing of electronic musical instruments (Yamaha), food and beverages and tourism.

== Nature ==
The Krupunder Lake (Krupunder See) is located in Rellingen. The lake was a swimming complex in the past. Until 1962 people were allowed to swim in the lake. The lake had a beach, changing rooms and some fast food outlets. The rivers Mühlenau and Pinnau flow through Rellingen.

== Notable residents ==
- Friedrich Ludwig Schröder, actor
- Abel Seyler, theatre director, interred in Rellingen
