= Bundesstraße 433 =

Federal highway in Germany

B 433
- Bundesstraße 433

Route information
- Length: 14.3 km (8.9 mi)

Location
- Country: Germany
- States: Hamburg, Schleswig-Holstein

Highway system
- Roads in Germany; Autobahns; List; Federal; List; State; E-roads

The Bundesstraße 433 is a Bundesstraße (federal road) in Hamburg.

== Path ==
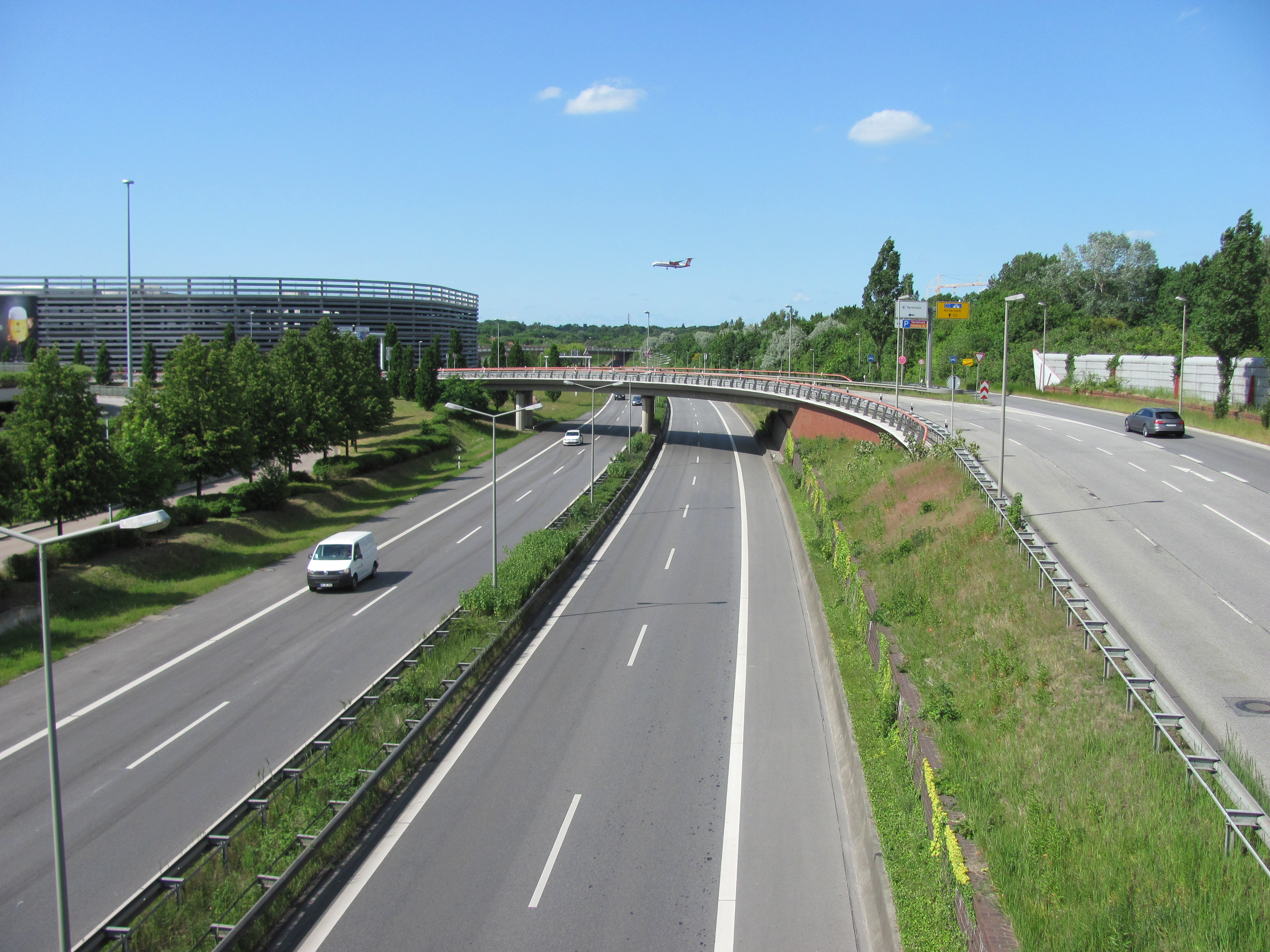
The B 433 at Hamburg Airport

The road begins in Hamburg-Eppendorf at the intersection with the B 5 and continues via the Tarpenbekstraße, Rosenbrook, Alsterkrugchaussee (in Hamburg-Groß Borstel), Flughafen-Umgehung (Airport bypass, in Hamburg-Fuhlsbüttel), the Krohnstiegtunnel, and the Swebenweg (in Hamburg-Niendorf) to the B 432, connecting to the AS Hamburg-Schnelsen-Nord on the A 7. Between its beginning in Eppendorf and the street Deelböge, the B 433 is part of the Hamburger Ring 2.

== History ==
In the 1990s, the B 433 followed a different alignment after the Hamburg Airport bypass. Past Fuhlsbüttel, it traveled via the Alsterkrugchaussee, Langenhorner Chaussee (in Hamburg-Langenhorn), Ochsenzoll, Ulzburger Straße (in Norderstedt), Hamburger Straße (in Henstedt-Ulzburg and Kaltenkirchen) to the B 4 in Lentföhrden. The B 433 north of Hamburg was downgraded in 2002, with the section north of Norderstedt being downgraded to a Landesstraße, and the section within Norderstedt being downgraded to a local road.

== See also ==
- List of federal highways in Germany
