= AquaDom =

Former aquarium in Berlin, Germany

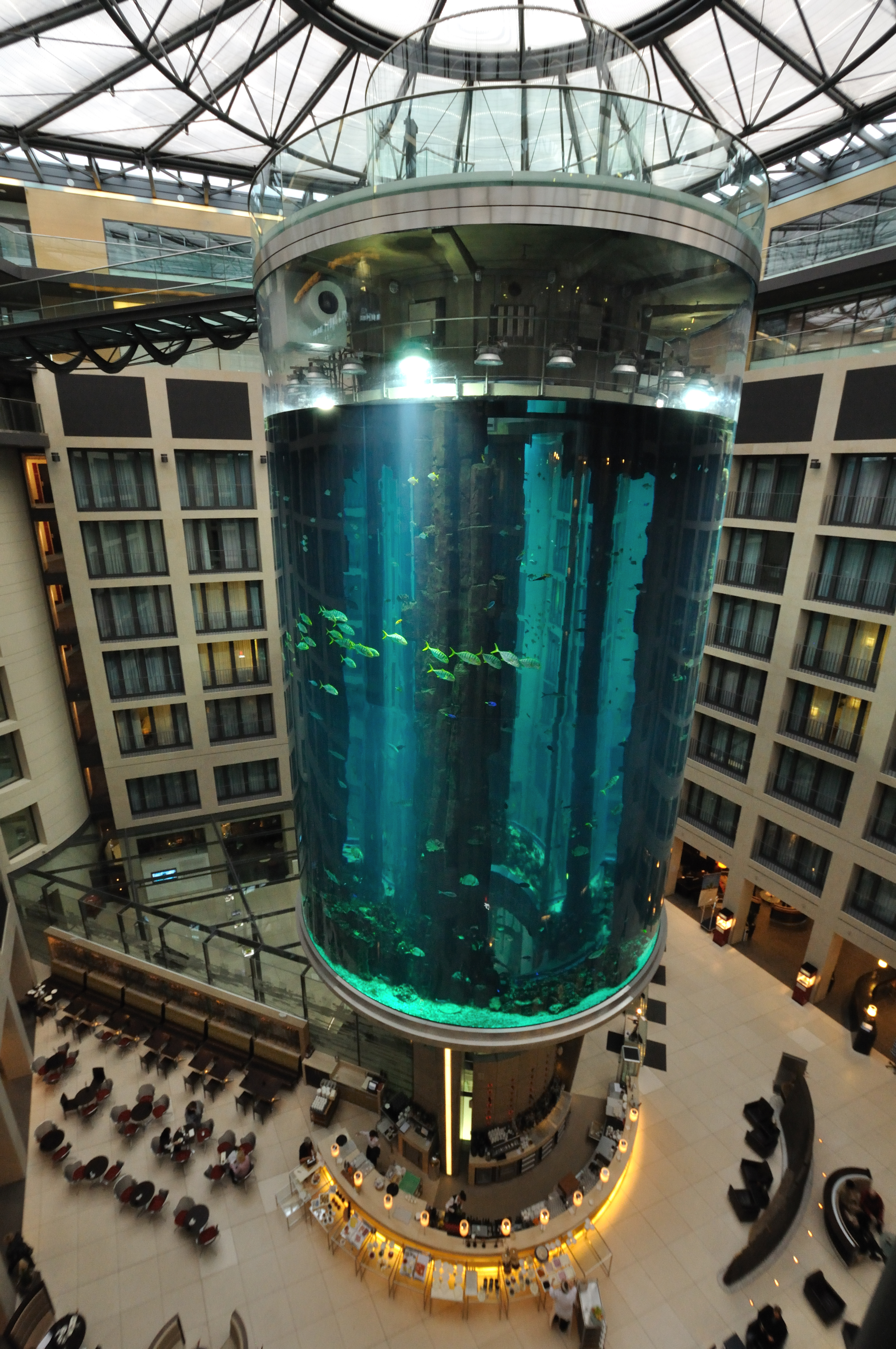
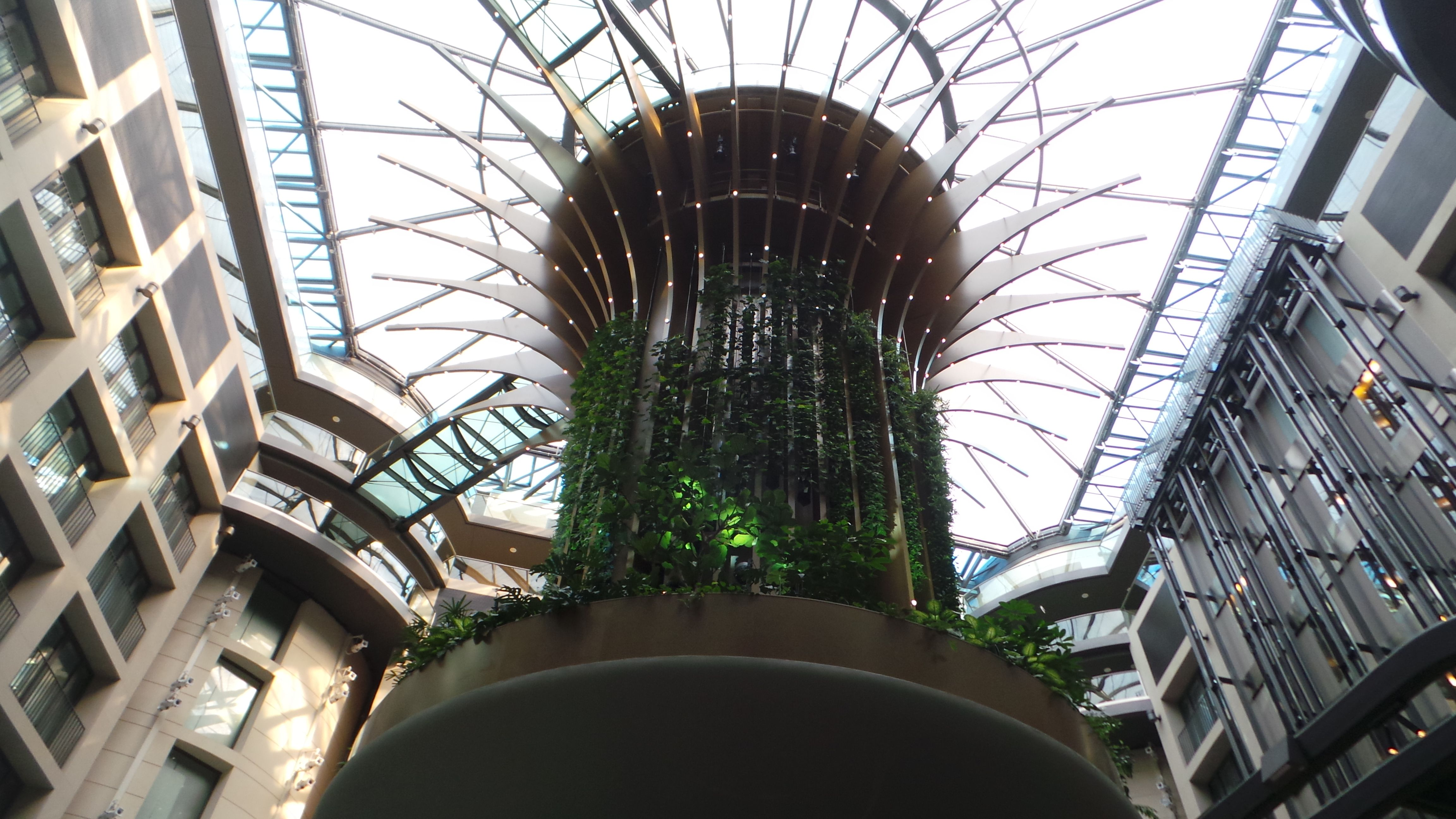
- The AquaDom prior to its destruction as viewed from a room on the sixth floor of the Radisson Collection hotel. The vertical garden that has replaced AquaDom, July 2025
- Interactive map of AquaDom
- 52°31′11″N 13°24′10″E
- Date opened: 2 December 2003
- Date closed: 16 December 2022 (rupture and collapse)
- Location: Berlin, Germany
- No. of animals: > 1,500
- No. of species: > 100
- Total volume of tanks: 980 m^{3} (35,000 cu ft)
- Owner: Union Investment
- Website: domaquaree.de

The AquaDom (mixed Latin and German: 'water dome', more formally 'water cathedral') was a 25-metre-tall (82 ft) cylindrical acrylic glass aquarium with built-in transparent elevator inside the lobby of the Radisson Collection Hotel in the DomAquarée complex on Karl-Liebknecht-Straße in Berlin-Mitte, Germany. The DomAquarée complex also contained offices, a museum, a restaurant, and the Berlin Sea Life Centre aquarium.

On 16 December 2022, the AquaDom aquarium ruptured and collapsed, propelling the 1,500 fish inside into nearby facilities and streets, causing considerable damage and killing the majority of the fish. A vertical indoor garden took its place in the lobby of the hotel, which reopened in February 2025.

== Construction ==
The AquaDom opened on 2 December 2003 at a cost of about 12.8 million euros. The acrylic cylinder was manufactured by International Concept Management, Inc. using Reynolds Polymer Technology panels, with architecture drawings provided by Sergei Tchoban. It was located in the same building as the Berlin Sea Life attraction but was owned and operated by Union Investment.

The aquarium was constructed from 41 acrylic panels – 26 panels for the outside cylinder and 15 panels for the inside cylinder for the elevator – which were bonded together on site. With a diameter of about 11 m (36 ft) and a height of about 16 m (52 ft), resting on a 9 m (30 ft) tall foundation, it held the Guinness World Record for the world's largest cylindrical aquarium.

== Operation ==
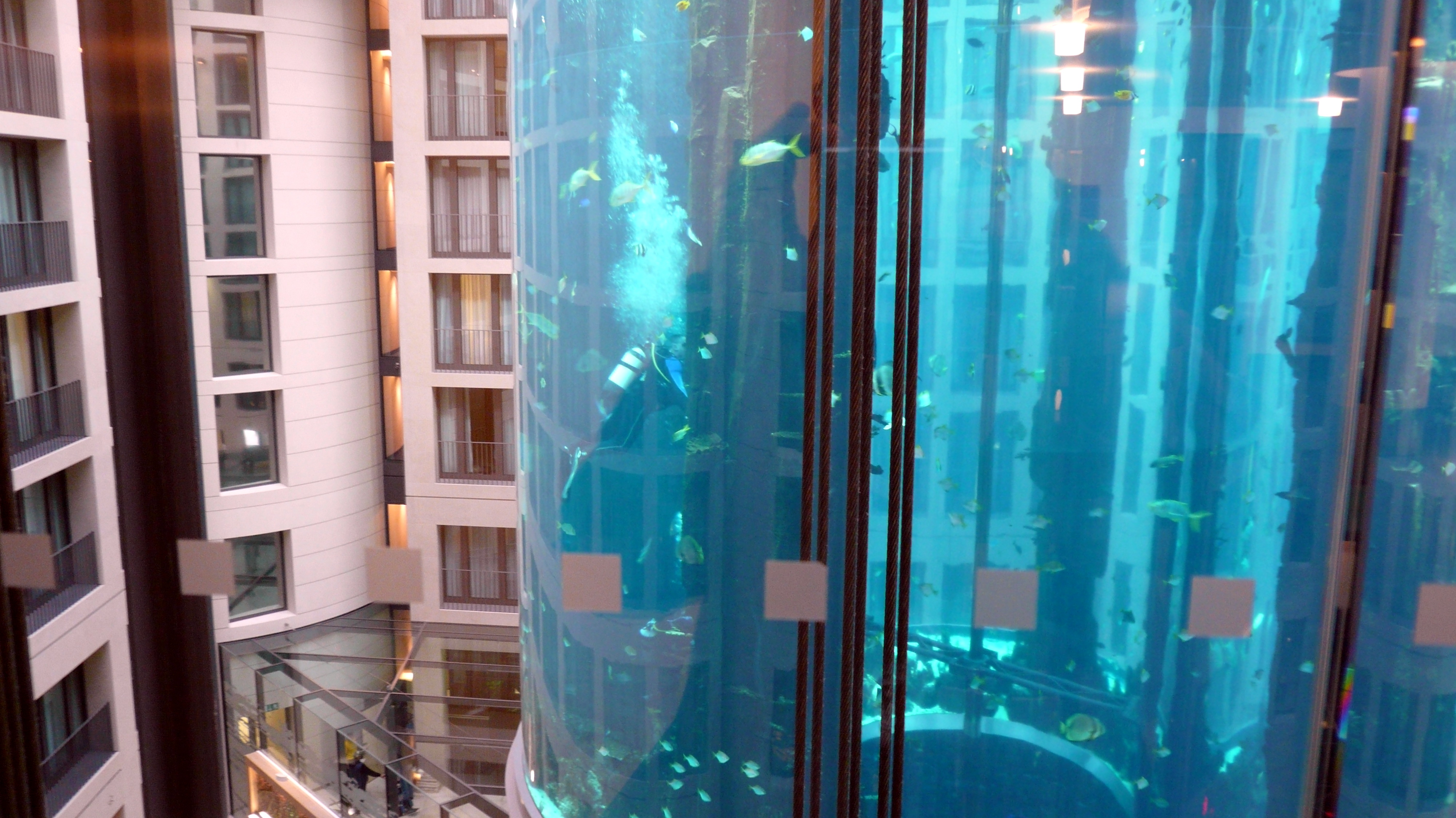
A scuba diver at work in the tank

The water column was 14 m (46 ft) high, held 1 million litres (260,000 US gal; 220,000 imp gal) of saltwater and accommodated about 1,500 tropical fish from over 100 species. A team of scuba divers conducted daily feedings, with 8 kg (18 lb) of feed-fish, and cleaned the tank daily. According to Union Investment, the owner of the complex, the wall thickness of the outer acrylic cylinder was 22 centimetres (8.7 in) at the bottom and 18 centimetres (7.1 in) at the top. The water temperature was kept at 26–27 °C (79–81 °F).

In 2020, the aquarium was refurbished and upgraded, with all the water drained and the fish temporarily relocated to a breeding facility in the basement. According to the owner, seals were renewed at the base and an additional sealing level was fitted. The cylinder was repaired and polished in places. Maintenance work on the elevator was conducted.

== Collapse and aftermath ==
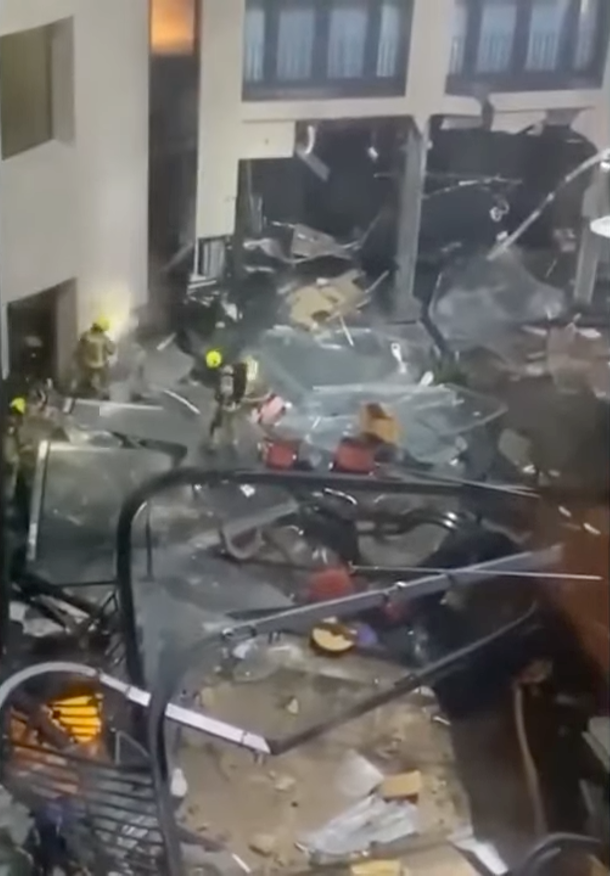
Rescue workers searching through the debris of the AquaDom on the morning of 16 December 2022.

The cylindrical tank burst at 5:43 am local time (4:43 am GMT) on 16 December 2022, sending approximately 1 million litres (260,000 US gal; 220,000 imp gal) of water together with the tank's 1,500 fish into the hotel lobby and adjacent street. Sandra Weeser, a member of Germany's Bundestag staying at the hotel at the time, described awakening to "a kind of shock wave".

Berlin's Technisches Hilfswerk (THW) rescue team mounted a full-scale deployment, completing operations 12 hours later — with the hotel's lobby and atrium remaining devastated, described by onlookers as resembling a battlefield.

The majority of the 1,500 fish were killed and two people were hospitalized with injuries. Officials noted the collapse could easily have taken several lives had it taken place during the hotel's busier operational hours.

Detected by local seismographs, the collapse sent the water out of the hotel lobby and into nearby storm drains, but not before damaging several nearby businesses, including a neighboring Lindt chocolate shop and the basement of the adjacent DDR Museum, the latter of which reopened three and a half months later. An associated power loss threatened hundreds of smaller fish in the facility's breeding tanks, which were ultimately rescued.

With no suspicion of foul play, and prior to a formal investigation, suspected causes included material fatigue, exacerbated by the difference between Berlin's very low air temperature (−9 °C (16 °F) that night), and the tank's water temperature (26 °C (79 °F)).

On 24 October 2023, prosecutors closed the investigation into the rupture after experts failed to determine a conclusive cause.

The hotel reopened after two years on 12 February 2025, with a 24-metre (79 ft) vertical garden consisting of about 2,000 plants of 22 species replacing the aquarium.

== Similar events ==
Catastrophic failures and major leaks have occurred at numerous large acrylic tanks, including failures at the T-Rex Café at Disney Springs in Orlando (2014); the Dubai Aquarium at the Dubai Mall (2010); the Orient Shopping Center, Shanghai (2012); the Gulfstream Casino, Hallandale Beach, Florida (2012); at the Lotte Tower, Seoul, South Korea (2014) and at the Mazatlan, Mexico Aquarium (2017).
