= Schafstedt =

- Municipality
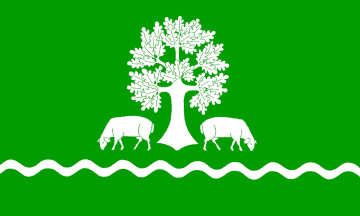
- Flag Coat of arms

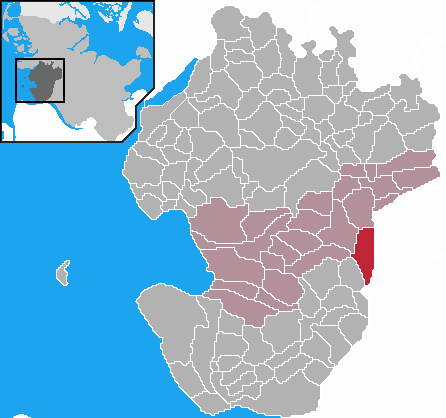
- Location of Schafstedt within Dithmarschen district
- Interactive map of Schafstedt
- Location within Germany Location within Schleswig-Holstein
- Coordinates: 54°04′N 09°18′E
- Country: Germany
- State: Schleswig-Holstein
- District: Dithmarschen
- Municipal assoc.: Mitteldithmarschen
- Subdivisions: 8

Government
  - Mayor: Klaus Buhmann

Area
  - Total: 18.16 km^{2} (7.01 sq mi)
- Elevation: 13 m (43 ft)

Population (2025-12-31)
  - Total: 1,275
  - Density: 70.21/km^{2} (181.8/sq mi)
- Time zone: UTC+01:00 (CET)
  - Summer (DST): UTC+02:00 (CEST)
- Postal codes: 25725
- Dialling codes: 04805
- Vehicle registration: HEI
- Website: www.schafstedt.de

Schafstedt (German pronunciation: [ˈʃaːfʃtɛt]) is a municipality in the district of Dithmarschen, in Schleswig-Holstein, Germany.

== See also ==
- Albersdorf (Amt Kirchspielslandgemeinde)
