= Bundesstraße 75 =

Federal highway in Germany

B 75
- Bundesstraße 75
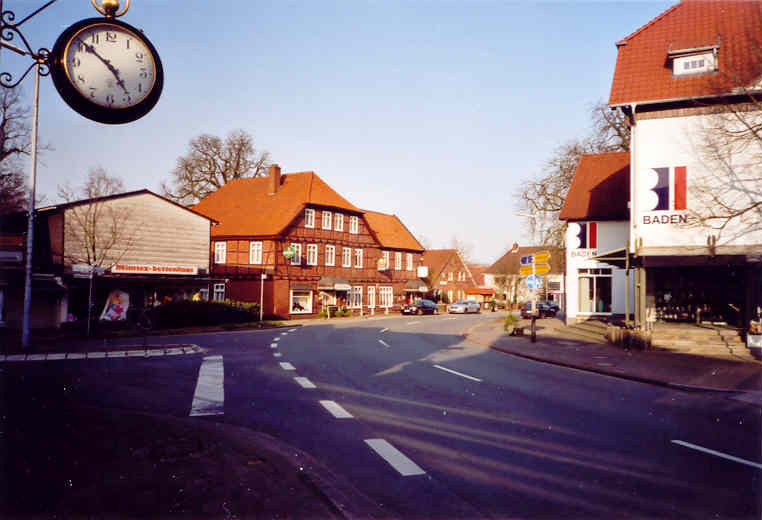
- B75 in Scheeßel

Route information
- Length: 207 km (129 mi) (partially replaced by Bundesautobahn and Landstraße)

Major junctions
- Northeast end: Lübeck borough of Travemünde
- Southwest end: Delmenhorst near Bremen

Location
- Country: Germany
- States: Schleswig-Holstein, Hamburg, Lower Saxony, Bremen

Highway system
- Roads in Germany; Autobahns; List; Federal; List; State; E-roads

The Bundesstraße 75 (or B 75) is a German federal highway running in a northeast to southwest direction from the Lübeck borough of Travemünde to Delmenhorst near Bremen.

The highway goes through the Herren Tunnel under the Trave river just shy of its northeastern terminus. It formerly crossed a drawbridge that the tunnel replaced.

== See also ==
- Transport in Hamburg
