= Tornesch =

- Town
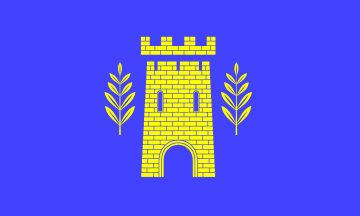
- Flag Coat of arms

- Location of Tornesch within Pinneberg district
- Interactive map of Tornesch
- Location within Germany Location within Schleswig-Holstein
- Coordinates: 53°42′N 9°43′E
- Country: Germany
- State: Schleswig-Holstein
- District: Pinneberg
- Subdivisions: 3 Stadtteile

Government
  - Mayor: Christopher Radon

Area
  - Total: 20.61 km^{2} (7.96 sq mi)
- Elevation: 12 m (39 ft)

Population (2025-12-31)
  - Total: 14,608
  - Density: 708.8/km^{2} (1,836/sq mi)
- Time zone: UTC+01:00 (CET)
  - Summer (DST): UTC+02:00 (CEST)
- Postal codes: 25436
- Dialling codes: 04122, 04120
- Vehicle registration: PI
- Website: www.tornesch.de

Tornesch (German pronunciation: [ˈtɔʁnɛʃ]; Low German: Torneesch) is a town in the district of Pinneberg, in Schleswig-Holstein, Germany. It is situated approximately 7 km (4 mi) southeast of Elmshorn, and 25 km (16 mi) northwest of Hamburg. Tornesch is also the home of the Klaus-Groth-Schule, named after the German poet Klaus Groth. It is also home to the Fritz-Reuter-Schule, named after German writer Fritz Reuter.

== History ==
Tornesch has a place in biochemical history from the wood saccharification process developed by Scholler, also known at the Scholler-Tornesch process. The first factory to use the process was built in Tornesch. This early work was part of the development of biofuel such as cellulosic ethanol.
