= Herren Tunnel =

German road-tunnel

Coordinates: 53°54′02″N 10°46′25″E

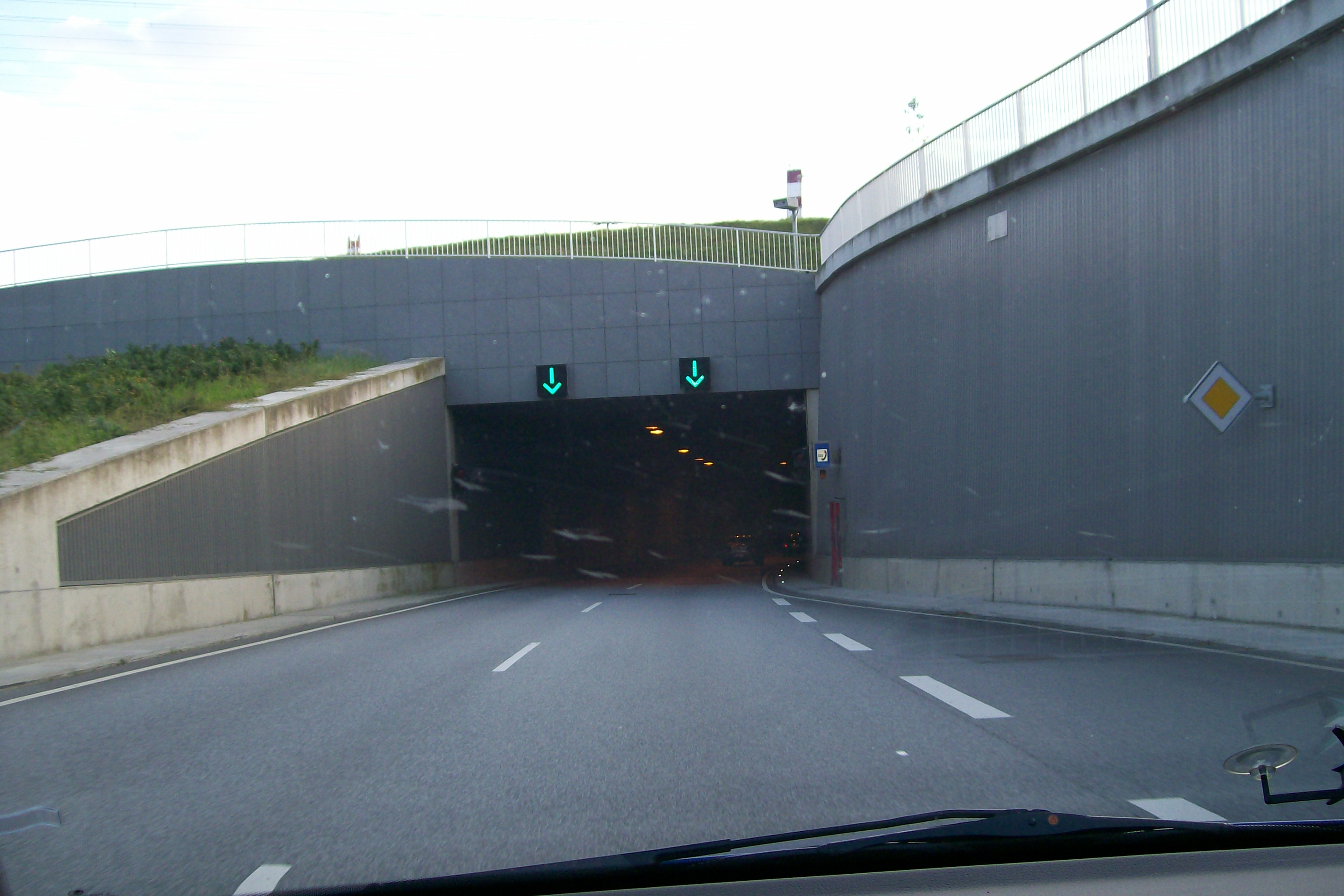
Herrentunnel

The Herren Tunnel (in German: Herrentunnel) is a German 780 metre-long road-tunnel underneath the river Trave. It is part of the national highway Bundesstrasse 75, connecting Lübeck and Travemünde. It is Germany's second toll tunnel, and was opened on 26 August 2005.

The tunnel replaces a bridge. Cyclists who could use the bridge regularly are not allowed to cycle through the tunnel and have to detour via Bad Schwartau or use a free shuttle bus with long waiting times through the tunnel.
