= Hohenfelde, Steinburg =

Hohenfelde
- Municipality
- Coat of arms

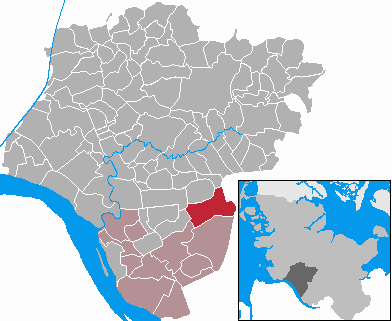
- Location of Hohenfelde within Steinburg district
- Interactive map of Hohenfelde
- Location within Germany Location within Schleswig-Holstein
- Coordinates: 53°51′N 9°37′E
- Country: Germany
- State: Schleswig-Holstein
- District: Steinburg
- Municipal assoc.: Horst-Herzhorn

Government
  - Mayor: Torben Stuke

Area
  - Total: 17.95 km^{2} (6.93 sq mi)
- Elevation: 3 m (9.8 ft)

Population (2025-12-31)
  - Total: 869
  - Density: 48.4/km^{2} (125/sq mi)
- Time zone: UTC+01:00 (CET)
  - Summer (DST): UTC+02:00 (CEST)
- Postal codes: 25358
- Dialling codes: 04126, 04127
- Vehicle registration: IZ
- Website: www.amt-horst-herzhorn.de

Hohenfelde (German pronunciation: [hoːənˈfɛldə]) is a municipality in the district of Steinburg, in Schleswig-Holstein, Germany.
