= Liebknecht Bridge =

Bridge in Berlin, Germany

Liebknecht Bridge Liebknechtbrücke
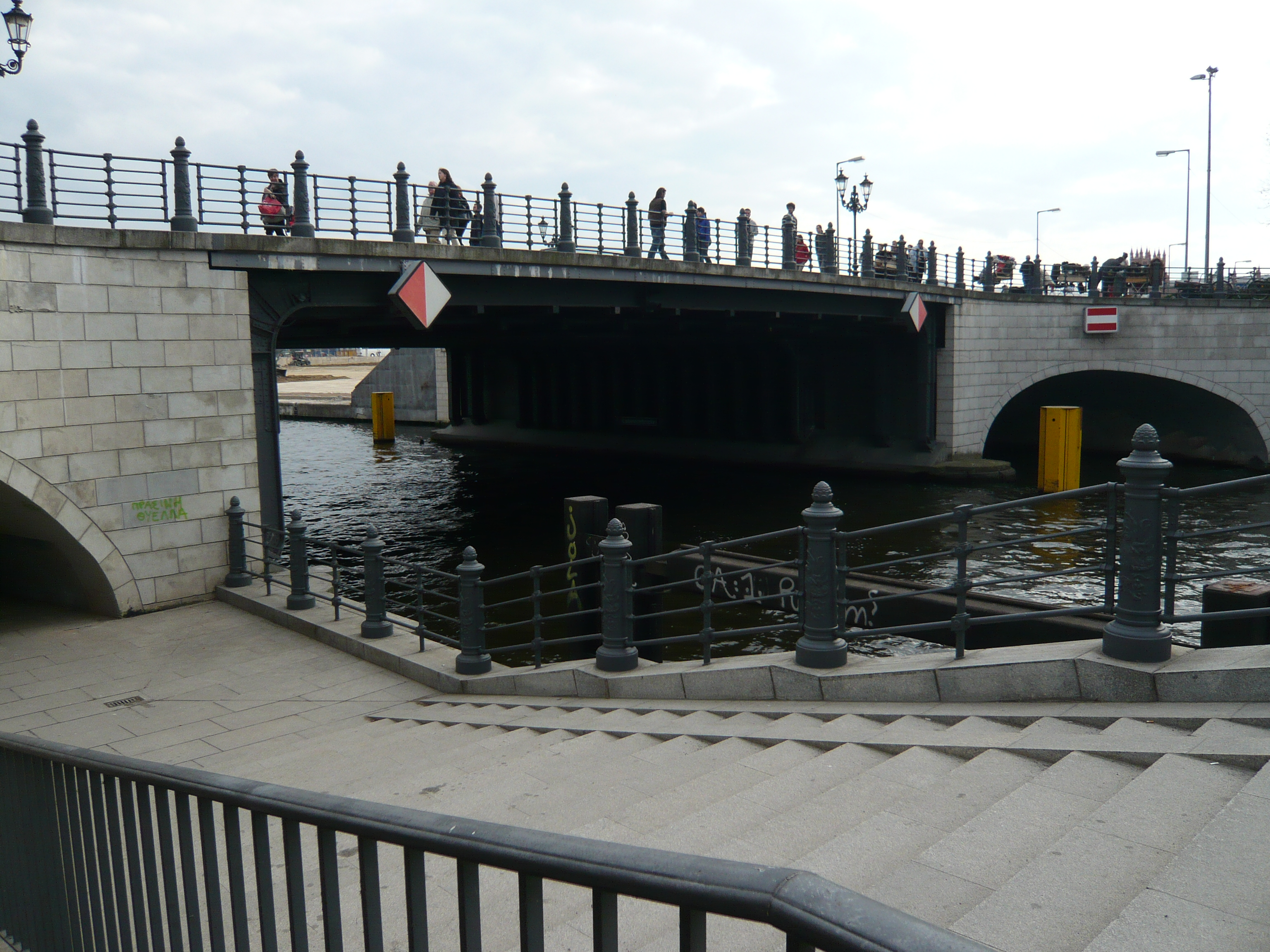
- Liebknecht Bridge
- Coordinates: 52°31′07″N 13°24′08″E
- Locale: Berlin, Germany

Location
- Interactive map of Liebknecht Bridge

Liebknecht Bridge (German: Liebknechtbrücke) is a bridge in Berlin, Germany.
