= Lägerdorf =

- Municipality
- Coat of arms

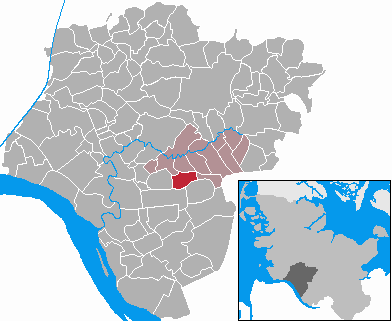
- Location of Lägerdorf within Steinburg district
- Interactive map of Lägerdorf
- Location within Germany Location within Schleswig-Holstein
- Coordinates: 53°53′N 9°35′E
- Country: Germany
- State: Schleswig-Holstein
- District: Steinburg
- Municipal assoc.: Breitenburg

Government
  - Mayor: Uwe Gaetje (CDU)

Area
  - Total: 5.96 km^{2} (2.30 sq mi)
- Elevation: 8 m (26 ft)

Population (2025-12-31)
  - Total: 2,654
  - Density: 445/km^{2} (1,150/sq mi)
- Time zone: UTC+01:00 (CET)
  - Summer (DST): UTC+02:00 (CEST)
- Postal codes: 25566
- Dialling codes: 04828
- Vehicle registration: IZ
- Website: www.amt-breitenburg.de

Lägerdorf is a municipality in the district of Steinburg, in Schleswig-Holstein, Germany.
