= Bundesstraße 5 =

Federal highway in Germany

B 5
- Bundesstraße 5
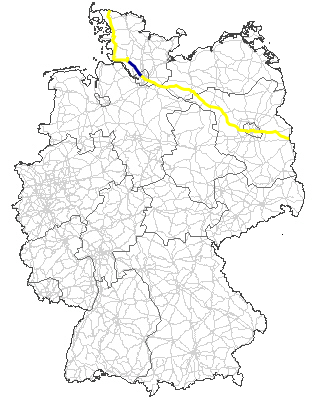

Route information
- Length: 553 km (344 mi)

Location
- Country: Germany
- States: Schleswig-Holstein, Hamburg, Mecklenburg-Vorpommern, Berlin, Brandenburg

Highway system
- Roads in Germany; Autobahns; List; Federal; List; State; E-roads

The Bundesstraße 5 (abbr. B5) is a German federal highway running in a northwesterly to southeasterly direction from the Danish border near Niebüll to Frankfurt (Oder). It provides a direct route for motorists traveling between Berlin and Hamburg. In Berlin B5 forms among others the following squares and streets Heerstraße, Theodor-Heuss-Platz, Kaiserdamm, Straße des 17. Juni, Großer Stern, Unter den Linden, Karl-Liebknecht-Straße, Alexanderplatz, Karl-Marx-Allee, Frankfurter Tor, and Frankfurter Allee. The section north of Hamburg is partially paralleled by Bundesautobahn 23.

== History ==
The numbering of Bundesstraße 5 follows the numbering of highways, then called in German: Fernverkehrsstraßen (literally in English: far traffic streets), in the Weimar Republic, issued on 17 January 1932. The Fernverkehrsstraße 5, or simply 5, however, continued from Frankfurt upon Oder (today as Polish DK29) via Crossen upon Oder, (today as Polish DK32) via Grünberg in Silesia, (today as Polish S3) via Lüben, (today as Polish DK36) via Parchwitz, (today as Polish DK94) via Breslau, Ohlau, Brieg, Oppeln in Silesia, Peiskretscham, (today as Polish DW901) via Gleiwitz (today as Polish DK88) to Beuthen in Upper Silesia.

The route between Berlin and Frankfurt upon Oder was already completed in 1803. The route from there to Breslau was built between 1817 and 1819. In 1824 the route was extended from Breslau until Gleiwitz. The section between Berlin and Hamburg was upgraded to a highway between 1827 and 1830, with its section crossing the Grand Duchy of Mecklenburg-Schwerin representing the first structurally designed road there. The routes Northwest of Hamburg were built in the 1850s. The section from Itzehoe until Bredstedt was finished in 1858.

In 1934 the Fernverkehrsstraßen were renamed into Reichsstraßen (literally in English: Reich's streets), but the numbering remained Reichsstraße 5 or R 5. By the Agreement of Potsdam in August 1945 the section East of the Oder-Neiße Line came under Polish authority and was subsequently renumbered within the Polish system of long-distance routes. After the foundation of the two new German republics in 1949 the section of R 5 within the West German Federal Republic of Germany and in West Berlin became Bundesstraße 5 (literally in English: federal street) or B 5. The section in the East German Democratic Republic (GDR) and East Berlin was given back its former name Fernverkehrsstraße 5 or F 5.

During the division of Germany the F 5 played a crucial role as transit route (German: Transitstrecke) between West Berlin and West German Northern Germany. Transit passengers were not allowed to deviate from the route. In East Berlin F 5 passed the Brandenburg Gate, which became an East Berlin checkpoint within the Berlin Wall on August 13, 1961, but was closed the very next day until December 22, 1989.

F 5 gradually lost its function as transit route to new built autobahns (today's A 19 and A 24) until it was rededicated for intra-GDR traffic only on 21 December 1987. After the unification of East Berlin, the GDR and West Berlin with the Federal Republic of Germany on October 3, 1990, the F 5 was named into Bundesstraße 5 or B 5.

== Bypasses and upgrades ==
Frankfurt (Oder)

Müncheberg

Herzfelde

Dahlwitz

Friedrichsfelde

Berlin (Alexanderplatz)

Wustermark (Nauen - Staaken Expressway)

Nauen

Friesack

Wusterhausen (Dosse)

Kyritz

Perleberg

Karstädt

Grabow (L072)

Grabow (A14)

Boizenburg (Elbe)

Bergedorf

Bergedorf - Hamm Expressway

Hamburg

Stellingen - Pinneberg

Pinneberg - Elmshorn (A23)

Elmshorn (K23)

Elmshorn - Itzehoe (A23)

Itzehoe (Bekmunde) - Wilster - Brunsbüttel

Diekshörn - Kattrepel

Marne

Helde - Friedrichstadt (through Tönning and B202)

Husum

Bredstedt
