= Rosdorf, Schleswig-Holstein =

Rosdorf
- Municipality
- Coat of arms

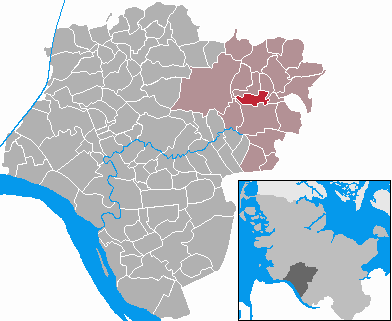
- Location of Rosdorf within Steinburg district
- Interactive map of Rosdorf
- Location within Germany Location within Schleswig-Holstein
- Coordinates: 53°58′N 9°43′E
- Country: Germany
- State: Schleswig-Holstein
- District: Steinburg
- Municipal assoc.: Kellinghusen

Government
  - Mayor: Hauke Vollstedt

Area
  - Total: 5.61 km^{2} (2.17 sq mi)
- Elevation: 3 m (9.8 ft)

Population (2025-12-31)
  - Total: 354
  - Density: 63.1/km^{2} (163/sq mi)
- Time zone: UTC+01:00 (CET)
  - Summer (DST): UTC+02:00 (CEST)
- Postal codes: 25548
- Dialling codes: 04822
- Vehicle registration: IZ
- Website: www.kellinghusen.de

Rosdorf (German pronunciation: [ˈʁɔsdɔʁf]) is a municipality in the district of Steinburg, in Schleswig-Holstein, Germany. It is located around 3 kilometres north of Kellinghusen and east of the Stör River. Rosdorf is situated in the Aukrug Nature Park. The federal highway Bundesstraße 206 from Lübeck to Itzehoe is about 4 kilometres south of Rosdorf.
