= Joachim Meyer-Quade =

German politician and judge (1897–1939)

Gauleiter of Gau Schleswig-Holstein
- In office 15 July 1932 – 15 December 1932
- Preceded by: Hinrich Lohse
- Succeeded by: Hinrich Lohse

Police President of Kiel
- In office 12 April 1934 – 10 September 1939

Personal details
- Born: 22 November 1897 Düsseldorf, Rhine Province, Prussia, Germany
- Died: 10 September 1939 (aged 41) Piątek, Poland
- Party: Nazi
- Occupation: Estate manager and newspaper editor

Military service
- Allegiance: Germany
- Branch/service: Imperial German Army; Wehrmacht
- Years of service: 1915–1920; 1939
- Rank: Vizefeldwebel; Leutnant
- Unit: Field Artillery Regiment 84; 99th Infantry Regiment
- Battles/wars: World War I World War II
- Awards: Iron Cross, 1st and 2nd class

Joachim Meyer-Quade (22 November 1897 – 10 September 1939) was a German Nazi Party (NSDAP) official and Sturmabteilung (SA) Obergruppenführer. He briefly served as the Gauleiter of Gau Schleswig-Holstein and was the Police President of Kiel. He entered the Wehrmacht at the beginning of the Second World War and was killed in action in the Polish Campaign.

== Early life and education ==
Meyer-Quade attended elementary and secondary school. In 1914 he served an agricultural apprenticeship in Dülmen. During the First World War, he joined Field Artillery Regiment No. 84 on 21 January 1915 and was deployed in August to Ypres. On 1 November, he transferred to the 99th Infantry Regiment with which he fought in Flanders, Verdun and the Somme. He was decorated for bravery, earning the Iron Cross 1st and 2nd class. He was promoted to Vizefeldwebel on 13 September 1916 but fell into French captivity on 1 November. After several attempts to escape, he was released from prisoner-of-war camp in January 1920.

== Career ==
Returning to Germany, Meyer-Quade worked again as an agricultural apprentice and then as an estate manager in North Schleswig. In 1923 he was expelled from the now Danish territory, following the 1920 Schleswig plebiscites. He found work in the Krupp factory in Kiel and then as a farm manager in Springe. From 1924 to 1925 he attended a higher education institution for practical farmers in Schleswig. He then worked as an agricultural inspector until 1926.

=== Nazism ===
On 13 June 1925 Meyer-Quade became a member of the Nazi Party (membership number 7,608). Together with the Gauleiter of Gau Schleswig-Holstein, Hinrich Lohse, Meyer-Quade was soon one of the leading Nazis in the Gau. He was named the Acting Ortsgruppenleiter (Local District Leader) in Schleswig on 1 July 1925, serving until 23 August. In 1926 he became the editor (editor-in-chief, 1930) of the North German Agricultural Newspaper. He joined the Sturmabteilung (SA) on 1 July 1927, becoming the local SA-Führer.

In January 1929 Meyer-Quade again became the Schleswig Ortsgruppenleiter as well as the Kreisleiter (County Leader) of Schleswig Kreis. In March, he was named Bezirksleiter (District Leader) of Northeast Schleswig-Holstein, an area comprising three Kreise. In November 1929, he became a member of the District Council of Schleswig. On 14 September 1930 he was elected to the Reichstag from electoral constituency 13, Schleswig-Holstein. He served until 24 May 1932, when he was elected to the Landtag of Prussia. There he was chairman of the agriculture committee from May 1932 until October 1933. On 15 July 1932 Meyer-Quade was promoted to SA-Oberführer and assumed the leadership of the SA for all Schleswig. From 15 July to December 1932 he briefly served as Gauleiter of Gau Schleswig-Holstein, when Lohse was temporarily promoted to the new position of Landesinspekteur, overseeing several Gaue. However, by mid-December, this new position had been abolished and Lohse returned as Gauleiter.

After the National Socialists came to power in January 1933, Meyer-Quade took on various governmental offices. From 5 May 1933 he served as the Landrat (District Administrator) of the Schleswig Kreis, leaving in December 1933 at his own request. In November 1933, 18 months after leaving the Reichstag, Meyer-Quade was again elected to the national parliament for Schleswig-Holstein, this time remaining a member until his death. Also in November 1933, he was named Acting SA-Führer of “SA-Gruppe Niedersachsen”, headquartered in Hanover. He served in that capacity until becoming SA-Führer of “SA-Gruppe Nordmark” based in Kiel on 1 February 1934; and on 12 April 1934 he was named Police President of Kiel. He would hold these two posts until his death. In July 1934 he was appointed to a five-year term on the People's Court. From 30 January 1935 to his death, he also sat on the Prussian Provincial Council of Schleswig-Holstein.

=== Kristallnacht ===
Meyer-Quade was promoted to SA-Obergruppenführer on 9 November 1937. On the evening of 9 November 1938 he ordered the launching of the Kristallnacht pogrom in Kiel, during which the Jewish synagogue was burned and 15 shops owned by Jews were destroyed along with several homes. Two Jews were shot and around 55 were arrested. The men were then transported to the Sachsenhausen concentration camp.

=== World War II ===
At the beginning of World War II in September 1939, Meyer-Quade reentered military service as a volunteer officer of reserves with the rank of Leutnant. He took part in the campaign in Poland, leading an infantry rifle company. Less than two weeks after the start of the war, he was killed in action at Piątek. The Nazis sought to portray Meyer-Quade as a martyr. He was eulogized in the Völkischer Beobachter by the SA Stabschef (Chief of Staff) Viktor Lutze who wrote: “Now he marches to immortality under the standard of Horst Wessel.” Piątek was renamed Quadenstädt in his honor. At the war's end, it resumed its prior name.

== Sources ==
- Lilla, Joachim; Döring, Martin; Schulz, Andreas (2004). Statisten in Uniform. Die Mitglieder des Reichstags 1933-1945. Düsseldorf: Droster Verlag. ISBN 3-7700-5254-4.
- Miller, Michael D.; Schulz, Andreas (2017). Gauleiter: The Regional Leaders of the Nazi Party and Their Deputies, 1925-1945. Vol. II (Georg Joel - Dr. Bernhard Rust). R. James Bender Publishing. ISBN 978-1-932970-32-6.
