= Hennstedt, Steinburg =

Hennstedt
- Municipality
- Coat of arms

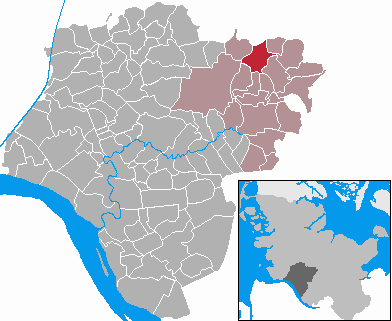
- Location of Hennstedt within Steinburg district
- Interactive map of Hennstedt
- Location within Germany Location within Schleswig-Holstein
- Coordinates: 54°2′N 9°43′E
- Country: Germany
- State: Schleswig-Holstein
- District: Steinburg
- Municipal assoc.: Kellinghusen

Government
  - Mayor: Klaus Rehder

Area
  - Total: 10.33 km^{2} (3.99 sq mi)
- Elevation: 67 m (220 ft)

Population (2025-12-31)
  - Total: 610
  - Density: 59/km^{2} (150/sq mi)
- Time zone: UTC+01:00 (CET)
  - Summer (DST): UTC+02:00 (CEST)
- Postal codes: 25581
- Dialling codes: 04877
- Vehicle registration: IZ
- Website: www.kellinghusen.de

Hennstedt (German pronunciation: [ˈhɛnʃtɛt]) is a municipality in the district of Steinburg, in Schleswig-Holstein, Germany.

== Geography and Transport ==
Hennstedt is located approximately ten kilometers north of Kellinghusen in the Aukrug Nature Park. The rivers Bullenbach, Kirchweddelbach, and Aubek flow through the municipality. Near the town is the Itzespitze, the highest elevation in the Steinburg district. The state roads 121 and 123 intersect in Hennstedt.

== History ==
The town was first mentioned in writing as the property of Rotmar von Henstide in the year 1148.

== Politics ==
=== Municipal council ===
In the municipal election held on May 14, 2023, a total of nine seats were allocated. The Hennstedt Municipal Voters' Association received five seats, and the General Voters' Association Hennstedt received four seats.

== Coat of arms ==
The municipality was granted its own coat of arms in 2011 with the aim of strengthening local identity. The coat of arms, designed by the graphic artist Uwe Nagel, is described as follows: A red cartwheel adorns a silver background above a green hill with six golden bricks; it is bordered at the top by a thrice-curved blue chief.

The three mountains and the hill illustrate Hennstedt's elevated position compared to neighboring communities. The five-spoke cartwheel symbolizes the roads leading to the surrounding villages. The golden bricks refer to the former brickworks and their economic significance. The green of the hill alludes to the importance of agriculture, while the remaining colors, blue, white, and red, correspond to the state colors of Schleswig-Holstein.

== Leisure, tourism, sights ==
In Hennstedt, one can find the bathing area Seelust, one of the few bathing spots in the Aukrug Nature Park.

Hennstedt is home to the sports club SV Kickers Hennstedt, which offers sports such as football (men/youth), women's handball, gymnastics, and tennis.

The neo-Gothic Christ Church was built in 1907 according to the plans of the Hamburg architect Hugo Groothoff.

A prominent landmark in Hennstedt is the 158-meter-high Hennstedt Telecommunications Tower, visible from afar.
