= Wiedenborstel =

- Municipality
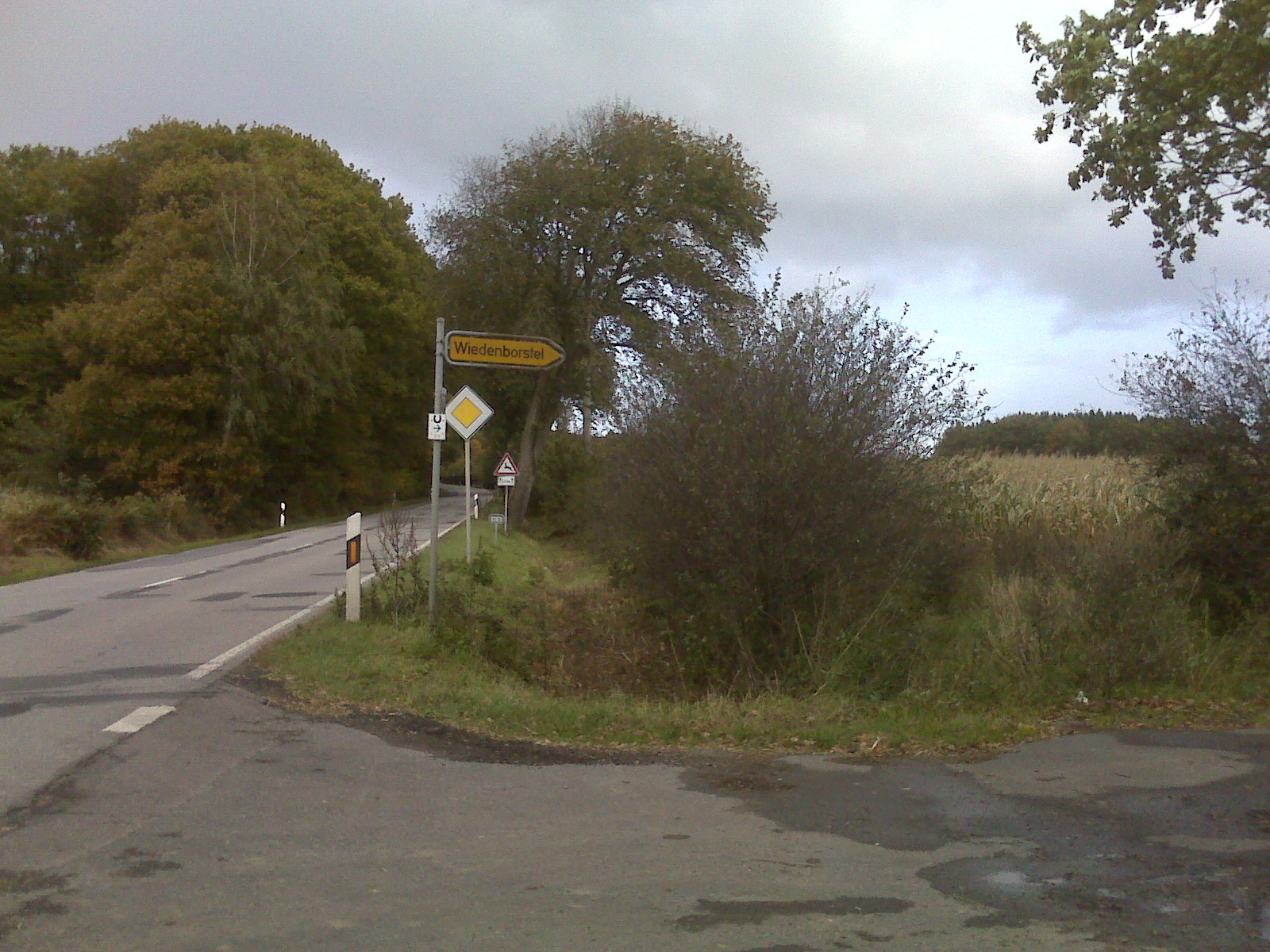
- Village entrance from the Landesstraße 121

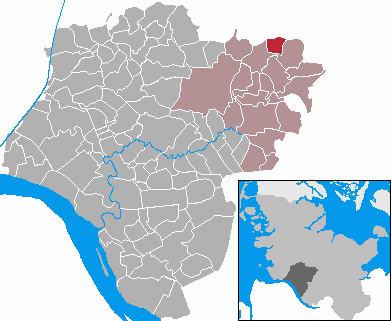
- Location of Wiedenborstel within Steinburg district
- Interactive map of Wiedenborstel
- Location within Germany Location within Schleswig-Holstein
- Coordinates: 54°3′N 9°46′E
- Country: Germany
- State: Schleswig-Holstein
- District: Steinburg
- Municipal assoc.: Kellinghusen

Government
  - Mayor: Heidi Lemmerbrock

Area
  - Total: 4.52 km^{2} (1.75 sq mi)
- Elevation: 46 m (151 ft)

Population (2025-12-31)
  - Total: 9
  - Density: 2.0/km^{2} (5.2/sq mi)
- Time zone: UTC+01:00 (CET)
  - Summer (DST): UTC+02:00 (CEST)
- Postal codes: 24613
- Dialling codes: 04873
- Vehicle registration: IZ
- Website: www.kellinghausen.de

Wiedenborstel (German pronunciation: [ˈviːdn̩ˌbɔʁstl̩]) is a municipality in the district of Steinburg, in Schleswig-Holstein, Germany.

== Geography ==
The village is located approximately 12 km north of Kellinghusen, and 10 km west of Neumünster, in the middle of Aukrug Nature Park. Hamburg is 75 km south.

== Demographics ==
Wiedenborstel was the least populated municipality in Germany as of 31 March 2010 with only eight inhabitants. All of the inhabitants belong to the same family. In 1910, Wiedenborstel had 119 inhabitants. Officially, by 31 December 2012, there were twelve inhabitants. It was no longer the least populous municipality in Germany, having lost that distinction to Gröde (with eleven inhabitants), and tied with Dierfeld (also with twelve). It was still the least densely populated municipality in Germany as of that date.
