= Hingstheide =

- Municipality
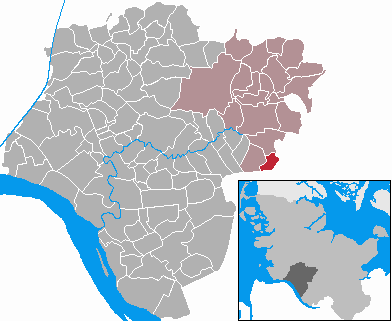
- Location of Hingstheide within Steinburg district
- Interactive map of Hingstheide
- Location within Germany Location within Schleswig-Holstein
- Coordinates: 53°54′N 9°45′E
- Country: Germany
- State: Schleswig-Holstein
- District: Steinburg
- Municipal assoc.: Kellinghusen

Government
  - Mayor: Susanne Storm

Area
  - Total: 3.83 km^{2} (1.48 sq mi)
- Elevation: 6 m (20 ft)

Population (2025-12-31)
  - Total: 81
  - Density: 21/km^{2} (55/sq mi)
- Time zone: UTC+01:00 (CET)
  - Summer (DST): UTC+02:00 (CEST)
- Postal codes: 25563
- Dialling codes: 04822
- Vehicle registration: IZ
- Website: www.kellinghusen.de

Hingstheide is a municipality in the district of Steinburg, in Schleswig-Holstein, Germany.
