= Poyenberg =

- Municipality
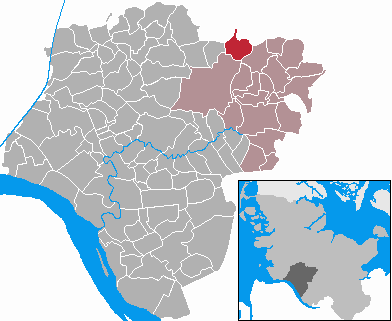
- Location of Poyenberg within Steinburg district
- Interactive map of Poyenberg
- Location within Germany Location within Schleswig-Holstein
- Coordinates: 54°1′N 9°41′E
- Country: Germany
- State: Schleswig-Holstein
- District: Steinburg
- Municipal assoc.: Kellinghusen

Government
  - Mayor: Karsten Beckmann

Area
  - Total: 8.82 km^{2} (3.41 sq mi)
- Elevation: 63 m (207 ft)

Population (2025-12-31)
  - Total: 365
  - Density: 41.4/km^{2} (107/sq mi)
- Time zone: UTC+01:00 (CET)
  - Summer (DST): UTC+02:00 (CEST)
- Postal codes: 25581
- Dialling codes: 04877
- Vehicle registration: IZ
- Website: www.kellinghusen.de

Poyenberg is a municipality in the district of Steinburg, in Schleswig-Holstein, Germany.
