= Quarnstedt =

- Municipality
- Coat of arms

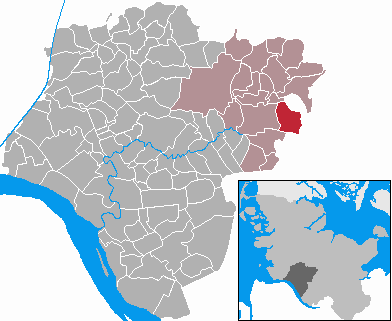
- Location of Quarnstedt within Steinburg district
- Interactive map of Quarnstedt
- Location within Germany Location within Schleswig-Holstein
- Coordinates: 53°57′N 9°47′E
- Country: Germany
- State: Schleswig-Holstein
- District: Steinburg
- Municipal assoc.: Kellinghusen

Government
  - Mayor: Adolf Humfeldt

Area
  - Total: 10.59 km^{2} (4.09 sq mi)
- Elevation: 4 m (13 ft)

Population (2025-12-31)
  - Total: 415
  - Density: 39.2/km^{2} (101/sq mi)
- Time zone: UTC+01:00 (CET)
  - Summer (DST): UTC+02:00 (CEST)
- Postal codes: 25563
- Dialling codes: 04822
- Vehicle registration: IZ
- Website: www.kellinghusen.de

Quarnstedt is a municipality in the district of Steinburg, in Schleswig-Holstein, Germany.
