= Waldemar Magunia =

German Nazi official and SA officer (1902–1974)

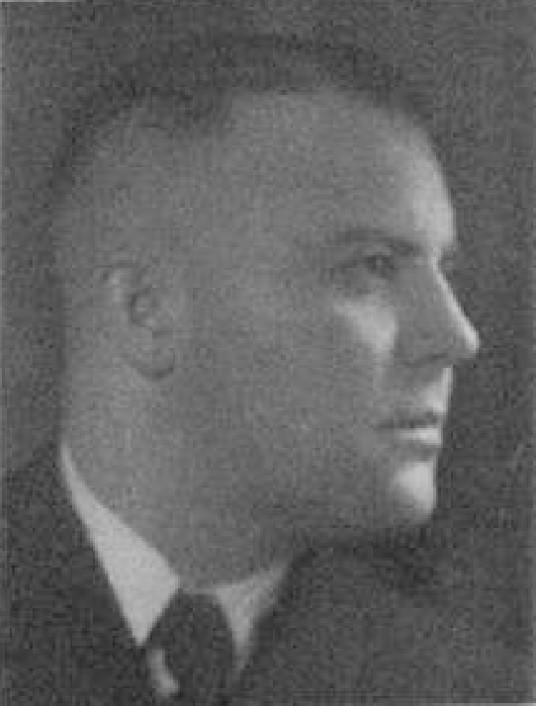
- Magunia, c. 1938

Generalkommissar, Generalbezirk Kiev Reichskommissariat Ukraine
- In office 14 February 1942 – 6 October 1943
- Appointed by: Erich Koch
- Preceded by: Helmut Quitzrau
- Succeeded by: Position abolished

Deputy and Representative of the Chief of Civil Administration Bezirk Bialystok
- In office August 1941 – January 1942
- Appointed by: Erich Koch

Gauobmann in East Prussia German Labor Front
- In office 1937–1941
- Appointed by: Robert Ley

Deputy Gauleiter Gau East Prussia
- In office January 1926 – 15 September 1928

Personal details
- Born: 8 December 1902 Königsberg, East Prussia, Kingdom of Prussia, German Empire
- Died: 16 February 1974 (aged 71) Oldenburg in Holstein, Schleswig-Holstein, West Germany
- Party: Nazi Party
- Profession: Master baker

Military service
- Allegiance: German Empire
- Branch/service: Imperial German Army; Freikorps
- Years of service: 1918–1922
- Unit: 1st (East Prussian) Foot Artillery Regiment
- Battles/wars: World War I

Waldemar Magunia (8 December 1902 - 16 February 1974) was a Nazi Party politician and an SA-Oberführer in the Nazi paramilitary organization, the Sturmabteilung (SA). During the Second World War, he worked in the occupied eastern territories, as the deputy to Erich Koch, the Chief of Civil Administration in Bezirk Bialystok, and then as the Generalkommissar for the General District of Kiev in the Reichskommissariat Ukraine.

== Early life ==
Magunia was born in Königsberg in East Prussia. After attending middle school, he volunteered for service in the First World War with the 1st (East Prussian) Foot Artillery Regiment "von Linger" on 28 March 1918. At the end of the war, he joined a Freikorps unit and left the military on 31 December 1922. He then completed an apprenticeship as a baker, passed the journeyman's and master's examinations by 1927 and then worked as a master baker.

== Nazi Party career ==
Magunia joined the Nazi Party in June 1921 and was appointed leader of the first Sturmabteilung (SA) unit in East Prussia. He served as the deputy Gauleiter in Gau East Prussia from January 1926 to 15 September 1928. He was elected as a member of the Landtag of Prussia in 1932, serving until its dissolution in October 1933. Also in 1932, he became the Party economic advisor in Gau East Prussia under Gauleiter Erich Koch. In 1933, he was briefly a member of the East Prussian provincial Landtag. In April 1933, he became president of the Handwerkskammer (Chamber of Crafts) for East Prussia, serving until 1942. In 1934, he attained the status of a Landeshandwerksmeister (State Master Craftsman). In November 1933, he was elected as a deputy to the Reichstag from electoral constituency 1 (East Prussia) and was re-elected in 1936 and 1938, serving until the fall of the Nazi regime. From 1937 to 1941, he also served as Gauobmann (chairman) of the German Labor Front (DAF) in Gau East Prussia.

== Second World War ==
From August 1941 to January 1942, Magunia served as the deputy and representative of Erich Koch who was the Chief of Civil Administration in Bezirk Bialystok, territory occupied after the German invasion of the Soviet Union. Finally, on 14 February 1942, Manugia was appointed the Generalkommissar (General Commissioner) for the Generalbezirk Kiev in the Reichskommissariat Ukraine, also under Koch who was the Reichskommissar. He remained in that post until just before the city fell to the Red Army in November 1943. In 1944, Magunia was promoted to the rank of SA-Oberführer.

After the end of the war in 1945, Magunia worked as a manager at a firm in Oldenburg in Holstein. In 1957, he stood as a candidate for the Bundestag for the Deutsche Reichspartei, a neo-Nazi party. He died on 16 February 1974 in Oldenburg in Holstein.

== Sources ==
- Klee, Ernst (2007). Das Personenlexikon zum Dritten Reich. Wer war was vor und nach 1945. Frankfurt-am-Main: Fischer-Taschenbuch-Verlag. ISBN 978-3-596-16048-8.
- Miller, Michael D.; Schulz, Andreas (2012). Gauleiter: The Regional Leaders of the Nazi Party and Their Deputies, 1925–1945. Vol. 1 (Herbert Albrecht – H. Wilhelm Hüttmann). R. James Bender Publishing. ISBN 978-1-932-97021-0.
- Stockhorst, Erich (1985). 5000 Köpfe: Wer War Was im 3. Reich. Arndt. ISBN 978-3-887-41116-9.
