= Wulfsmoor =

- Municipality
- Coat of arms

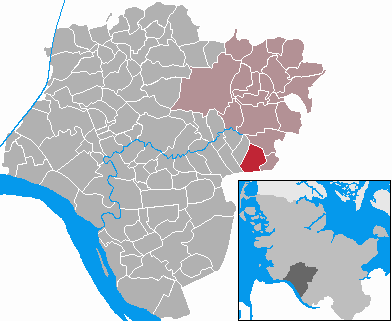
- Location of Wulfsmoor within Steinburg district
- Interactive map of Wulfsmoor
- Location within Germany Location within Schleswig-Holstein
- Coordinates: 53°55′N 9°44′E
- Country: Germany
- State: Schleswig-Holstein
- District: Steinburg
- Municipal assoc.: Kellinghusen

Government
  - Mayor: Reimer Kläschen

Area
  - Total: 8.78 km^{2} (3.39 sq mi)
- Elevation: 2 m (6.6 ft)

Population (2025-12-31)
  - Total: 365
  - Density: 41.6/km^{2} (108/sq mi)
- Time zone: UTC+01:00 (CET)
  - Summer (DST): UTC+02:00 (CEST)
- Postal codes: 25563
- Dialling codes: 04822
- Vehicle registration: IZ
- Website: www.kellinghusen.de

Wulfsmoor is a municipality in the district of Steinburg, in Schleswig-Holstein, Germany.
