= Oeschebüttel =

- Municipality
- Coat of arms

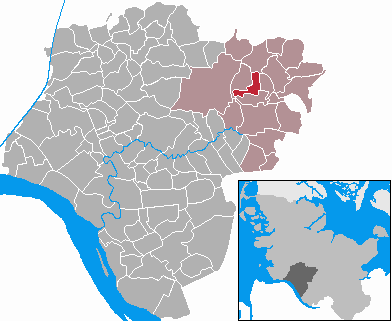
- Location of Oeschebüttel within Steinburg district
- Interactive map of Oeschebüttel
- Location within Germany Location within Schleswig-Holstein
- Coordinates: 53°59′N 9°43′E
- Country: Germany
- State: Schleswig-Holstein
- District: Steinburg
- Municipal assoc.: Kellinghusen

Government
  - Mayor: Heiner Rickers

Area
  - Total: 5.48 km^{2} (2.12 sq mi)
- Elevation: 15 m (49 ft)

Population (2025-12-31)
  - Total: 177
  - Density: 32.3/km^{2} (83.7/sq mi)
- Time zone: UTC+01:00 (CET)
  - Summer (DST): UTC+02:00 (CEST)
- Postal codes: 25548
- Dialling codes: 04822, 04826, 04877
- Vehicle registration: IZ
- Website: www.kellinghusen.de

Oeschebüttel is a municipality in the district of Steinburg, in Schleswig-Holstein, Germany.
