= Gau Schleswig-Holstein =

- Gau of Nazi Germany
- 1925–1945
- Flag Coat of arms

- Capital: Kiel
- Government
- Gauleiter
  - 1925–1945: Hinrich Lohse
- History
  - Establishment: 26 February 1925
  - Disestablishment: 8 May 1945
Preceded by
Province of Schleswig-Holstein
Free City of Lübeck
Free State of Oldenburg
Succeeded by
Schleswig-Holstein
- Today part of: Germany

The Gau Schleswig-Holstein was formed on 26 February 1925. It was an administrative division of Nazi Germany from 1933 to 1945 in the Prussian Province of Schleswig-Holstein, parts of the Free State of Oldenburg and, from 1 April 1937, the Free City of Lübeck. Before that, from 1925 to 1933, it was the regional subdivision of the Nazi Party in that area.

== History ==
The Nazi Gau (plural Gaue) system was originally established in a party conference on 22 May 1926, in order to improve administration of the party structure. From 1933 onwards, after the Nazi seizure of power, the Gaue increasingly replaced the German states as administrative subdivisions in Germany.

At the head of each Gau stood a Gauleiter, a position which became increasingly more powerful, especially after the outbreak of the Second World War, with little interference from above. Local Gauleiters often held government positions as well as party ones and were in charge of, among other things, propaganda and surveillance and, from September 1944 onward, the Volkssturm and the defense of the Gau.

The position of Gauleiter in Schleswig-Holstein was held by Hinrich Lohse from its establishment on 26 February 1925 throughout the history of the Gau, with the exception of a six-month period in 1932 when the office was held by Joachim Meyer-Quade. From 1941 onward Lohse was simultaneously in charge of the Reichskommissariat Ostland where he was responsible for the implementation of Nazi Germanization policies built on the foundations of the Generalplan Ost: the killing of almost all Jews, Romani people and Communists and the oppression of the local population were its necessary corollaries. He was sentenced to ten years in prison in 1948 but released in 1951, an extradition request by the Soviet Union having been refused, and died in 1964.
