= Hinrich Lohse =

German Nazi Party politician (1896–1964)

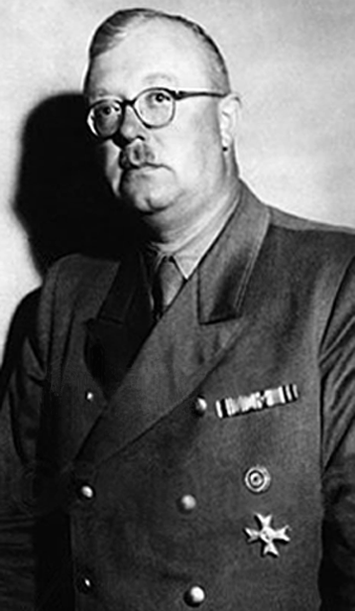
- Lohse in 1941

Reichskommissar for the Ostland
- In office 25 July 1941 – 13 August 1944
- Appointed by: Adolf Hitler
- Preceded by: Office established
- Succeeded by: Erich Koch

Oberpräsident Province of Schleswig-Holstein
- In office 25 March 1933 – 6 May 1945
- Preceded by: Heinrich Thon
- Succeeded by: Otto Hoevermann (acting)

Gauleiter Gau Schleswig-Holstein
- In office 27 March 1925 – 6 May 1945
- Führer: Adolf Hitler
- Preceded by: Office established
- Succeeded by: Office abolished

Legislative positions
- 1933–1945: Reichstag Deputy
- 1932: Reichstag Deputy
- 1928–1933: Landtag of Prussia Deputy
- 1924–1930: Altona City Councilor

Personal details
- Born: 2 September 1896 Mühlenbarbek, Schleswig-Holstein, Prussia, German Empire
- Died: 25 February 1964 (aged 67) Mühlenbarbek, Schleswig-Holstein, West Germany
- Party: Nazi Party
- Other political affiliations: Deutschvölkischer Schutz- und Trutzbund; Völkisch-Social Bloc
- Occupation: Bank clerk
- Civilian awards: Golden Party Badge; Nuremberg Party Day Badge

Military service
- Allegiance: German Empire
- Branch/service: Imperial German Army
- Years of service: 1915–1916
- Unit: Reserve Infantry Regiment 76; Reserve Infantry Regiment 94
- Battles/wars: World War I
- Military awards: Wound Badge, in black

Hinrich Lohse (2 September 1896 – 25 February 1964) was a German Nazi Party official, politician and convicted war criminal. He served as the Gauleiter and Oberpräsident of Schleswig-Holstein and was an SA-Obergruppenführer in the Nazi paramilitary organization, the Sturmabteilung (SA). He is best known for his rule of the Reichskommissariat Ostland, during the Second World War. The Reichskommissariat comprised the modern-day states of Lithuania, Latvia, and Estonia, as well as parts of Belarus, and was the scene of Holocaust-related atrocities. Lohse was sentenced to ten years in prison in 1948 but was released in 1951.

== Early life ==
Hinrich Lohse was born into a peasant family in the town of Mühlenbarbek in the Province of Schleswig-Holstein. From 1903 to 1912 he attended the Volksschule in his home town and, for the next year, a trade school in Hamburg. In 1913, he began working at the Blohm & Voss shipyard in Hamburg. During the First World War, he was conscripted into Reserve Infantry Regiment 76 of the Imperial German Army on 23 September 1915. He served in combat on the western front with Reserve Infantry Regiment 94 until he was severely wounded on 9 August 1916. He was awarded the Wound Badge in black, and was discharged from the military with a ten-percent war disability in November. He returned to employment in the shipbuilding industry and later moved into banking. From 1919, Lohse was an associate at the Schleswig-Holstein Farmers' Association and, as of 1920, business manager in Neumünster of the Schleswig-Holstein Farmers and Farmworkers Democracy, the regional agrarian political party.

== Nazi Party career in Schleswig-Holstein ==
By 1923, Lohse was a member of the Deutschvölkischer Schutz- und Trutzbund, the largest and most active antisemitic organization in the Weimar Republic. In the Spring of that year, he joined the Nazi Party (membership number 7,522) and was appointed the Party's Gauleiter for Schleswig-Holstein on 27 March 1925. As an early Party member, he would later be awarded the Golden Party Badge. During the time that the Party was banned in the wake of Adolf Hitler's failed Beer Hall Putsch of November 1923, Lohse joined the Völkisch-Social Bloc, a Nazi front organization, and was elected under its banner to the city council of Altona. When Hitler refounded the Nazi Party in February 1925, Lohse became the Ortsgruppenleiter (local group leader) of Altona, and formally re-enrolled in the Party on 13 June. He continued to sit on the city council as a Nazi Party member until 1930.

In September 1925, Lohse joined the National Socialist Working Association, a short-lived group of northern and western German Gaue, organized and led by Reich Organization Leader Gregor Strasser, which unsuccessfully sought to amend the Party program. It was dissolved in 1926 following the Bamberg Conference. In May 1928, Lohse was elected to the Landtag of Prussia where he served until it was dissolved by the Nazis in October 1933.

Between 3 September 1928 and 15 April 1929, Lohse also temporarily administered Gau Hamburg before the appointment of Karl Kaufmann as Gauleiter. In August 1929, he attended the party rally in Nuremberg for which he was awarded the Nuremberg Party Day Badge. During this time, he also led into the Nazi Party various nationally-oriented farming associations in northern Germany, such as the Rural People's Movement. On 15 July 1932, he was appointed as Landesinspekteur-North. In this position, he had oversight responsibility for his Gau and three others (Hamburg, Mecklenburg-Lubeck, and Pomerania). This was a short-lived initiative by Strasser to centralize control over the Gaue. However, it was unpopular with all the Gauleiter and was repealed on Strasser's fall from power in December 1932. Lohse then returned to his Gauleiter position in Schleswig-Holstein.

In the July 1932 parliamentary election, Lohse was elected to the Reichstag for electoral constituency 13 (Schleswig-Holstein). While he was not elected at the following two general elections in November and March, he returned as a member for Schleswig-Holstein at the November 1933 election and retained this seat until the fall of the Nazi regime in May 1945. Shortly after the Nazi seizure of power he was appointed as Oberpräsident (high president) of the province of Schleswig-Holstein on 25 March 1933. He thus united under his control the highest Party and governmental offices in the province. On 11 April, he was named as the province's plenipotentiary to the Reichsrat, serving until its abolition by the Nazis on 14 February 1934. On 11 July 1933, Lohse was named to the recently reconstituted Prussian State Council. On 15 November, he was made an honorary SA-Gruppenführer in the Nazi paramilitary, the Sturmabteilung (SA). In 1934, he took over the chairmanship of the Nordische Gesellschaft (Nordic Association). On 1 January 1937, he was promoted to SA-Obergruppenführer. On 16 November 1942, Lohse was appointed the Reich Defense Commissioner for his Gau.

== Reichskommissar in the Baltics and Holocaust involvement ==
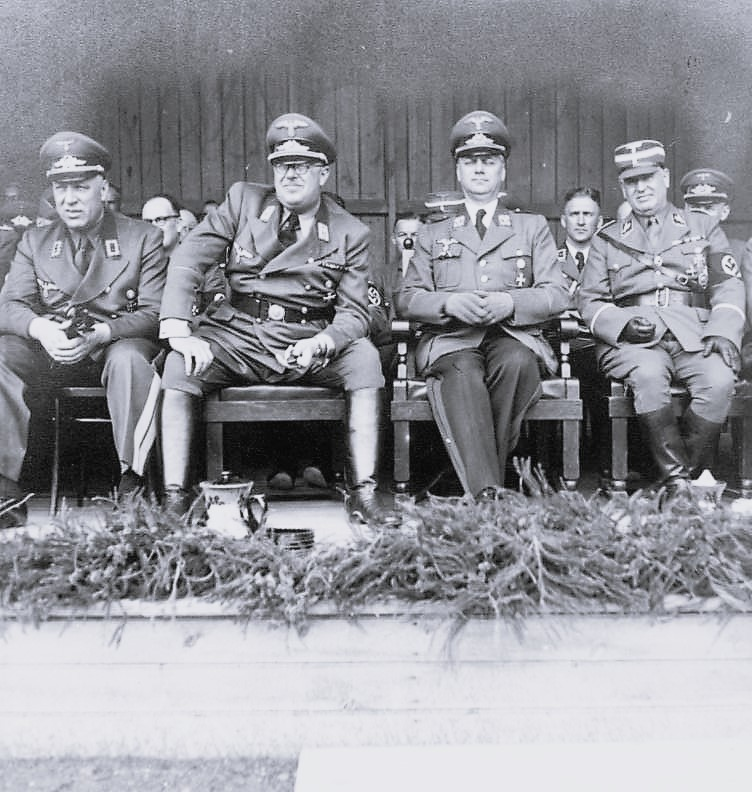
General Commissioner of Latvia Otto-Heinrich Drechsler, Reich Commissar for the Ostland Hinrich Lohse, Reich Minister for the Occupied Eastern Territories Alfred Rosenberg and SA Officer Eberhard Medem in Dobele (1942).

On 25 July 1941, following the German conquest of the Baltic states from the Soviet Union, Lohse was appointed Reichskommissar for the Ostland. Lohse retained his functions in Schleswig-Holstein and shuttled between his two seats of Riga and Kiel. He reported to Reichsminister Alfred Rosenberg of the Reich Ministry for the Occupied Eastern Territories and had charge of the implementation of Nazi Germanization policies on the basis of the Generalplan Ost, which involved the killing of almost all Jews, Romani people, and Communists, and the oppression of the local population that was its necessary corollary. Lohse did not have direct line-authority over the police forces or over Einsatzgruppen A, whose murderous actions were under the control of SS-Brigadeführer and Generalmajor der Polizei Franz Walter Stahlecker, and Higher SS and Police Leader (HSSPF) SS-Obergruppenführer Friedrich Jeckeln, the chief organizer of the Rumbula massacre in Latvia in 1941.

Nevertheless, as the leader of the civil administration, he implemented, through a series of special edicts and guiding principles, many of the preparatory acts that facilitated the subsequent police Aktionen (the Nazi euphemism for killing operations). These measures, first put forth in his decree of 27 July 1941, included compiling lists of Jews, mandating that they must wear the yellow badge, confiscating their property and banning them from public transportation, school attendance or employment in professions. Jews considered employable were to be used in forced labor. They were to be gathered together in ghettos and were "to be given only as much food as the rest of the population can do without, but no more than suffices for scanty nourishment of the Ghetto inmates". In particular, Lohse shared responsibility with HSSPF SS-Obergruppenführer Hans-Adolf Prützmann for the enslavement and ghettoization of the Jews of Latvia.

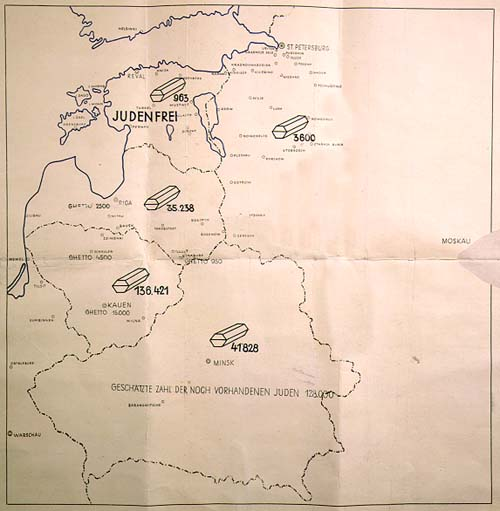
Annotated map of the Reichskommissariat Ostland documenting 220,250 murders committed by Einsatzgruppe A by October 1941, with Estonia marked as Judenfrei

On 31 October 1941, Georg Leibbrandt, a high official in the Reich Ministry, wrote to Lohse requesting an explanation for his order forbidding the execution of Jews in Libau. Lohse replied on 15 November acknowledging that "the cleansing of the East of Jews is a necessary task", but asking whether there was "a directive to liquidate all Jews in the East … without regard to age and sex and economic interests" affecting the war economy. Leibbrandt's deputy, Otto Bräutigam, responded on 18 December, informing Lohse that "Economic considerations should fundamentally remain unconsidered in the settlement of the [Jewish] problem". Though Lohse raised concerns about the murder of Jews that was taking place, like many civil administrators, he did this out of a concern for the impact on the local war-economy. After receiving the reply, he continued to remain in his post for the next three years while Holocaust-related murders continued. Lohse fled the Reichskommissariat Ostland without authorization on 13 August 1944 in the face of the Red Army advance, and he was immediately removed as Reichskommissar. On 21 September 1944, Hitler replaced Lohse in the Ostland with Erich Koch. Lohse returned to Gau Schleswig-Holstein, where he continued to exercise absolute power as Gauleiter and Reich Defense Commissioner until the last days of the war in Europe.

== Postwar trial and life ==
On 6 May 1945, Lohse was dismissed as Oberpräsident of Schleswig-Holstein by German President Karl Dönitz and, shortly thereafter, was imprisoned by the British Army. He was tried by the court in Bielefeld between October 1947 and January 1948, and was sentenced to 10 years in prison and confiscation of his property. A request by the Soviet Union for his execution was denied. He was held at the prison in Esterwegen until he was released in March 1951 due to ill health (thrombosis). In July of the same year, a finding by the Kiel denazification committee placed him in Group III (lesser offenders) and authorized him to receive a pension of 25% of an Oberpräsident's salary. However, in March 1952, the pension was revoked by the German government in Bonn under pressure from the Landtag of Schleswig-Holstein in protest of his antidemocratic rule in the province. His appeal of this issue was dismissed by the Federal Administrative Court in October 1955. Lohse spent his later years in his hometown of Mühlenbarbek, where he died in February 1964.

== See also ==
- New Order (Nazism)
- Nazism and race
- German occupation of the Baltic states during World War II
- German occupation of Estonia during World War II
- German occupation of Latvia during World War II
- German occupation of Lithuania during World War II
- German occupation of Byelorussia during World War II
- Forced labour under German rule during World War II

== Sources ==
- Information about Hinrich Lohse in the Reichstag database
- Lohalm, Uwe (1970). Völkischer Radikalismus: die Geschichte des Deutschvölkischen Schutz- und Trutz-Bundes, 1919-1923. Hamburg: Leibniz-Verlag. ISBN 978-3-874-73000-6.
- Mazower, Mark (2008). Hitler's Empire: How the Nazis Ruled Europe. New York: The Penguin Press. ISBN 978-1-594-20188-2.
- Miller, Michael D.; Schulz, Andreas (2017). Gauleiter: The Regional Leaders of the Nazi Party and Their Deputies, 1925–1945. Vol. 2 (Georg Joel – Dr. Bernhard Rust). R. James Bender Publishing. ISBN 978-1-932-97032-6.
- Orlow, Dietrich (1969). The History of the Nazi Party: 1919–1933. University of Pittsburgh Press. ISBN 0-8229-3183-4.
- Wistrich, Robert S. (1982). Who's Who in Nazi Germany. Macmillan Publishing Co. ISBN 0-02-630600-X.
