= Willenscharen =

- Municipality
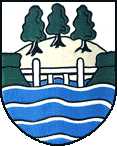
- Coat of arms

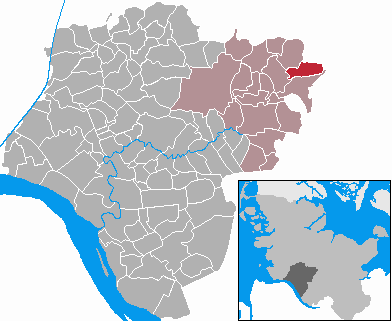
- Location of Willenscharen within Steinburg district
- Interactive map of Willenscharen
- Location within Germany Location within Schleswig-Holstein
- Coordinates: 54°1′N 9°48′E
- Country: Germany
- State: Schleswig-Holstein
- District: Steinburg
- Municipal assoc.: Kellinghusen

Government
  - Mayor: Harm Thun

Area
  - Total: 7.62 km^{2} (2.94 sq mi)
- Elevation: 6 m (20 ft)

Population (2025-12-31)
  - Total: 165
  - Density: 21.7/km^{2} (56.1/sq mi)
- Time zone: UTC+01:00 (CET)
  - Summer (DST): UTC+02:00 (CEST)
- Postal codes: 24616
- Dialling codes: 04324
- Vehicle registration: IZ
- Website: www.kellinghusen.de

Willenscharen is a municipality in the district of Steinburg, in Schleswig-Holstein, Germany. The airfield of the model airplane community of Steinburg is located here.
