= Kellinghusen (Amt) =

Kellinghausen
- Amt
- Coat of arms

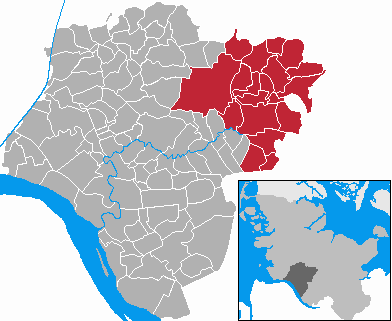
- Location of the Kellinghausen Amt within Steinburg district
- Interactive map of Kellinghausen
- Location within Germany Location within Schleswig-Holstein
- Coordinates: 53°57′N 9°43′E
- Country: Germany
- State: Schleswig-Holstein
- District: Steinburg
- Seat: Kellinghusen
- Subdivisions: 19 municipalities

Government
  - Mayor: Clemens Preine

Area
  - Total: 195.74 km^{2} (75.58 sq mi)

Population (2025-12-31)
  - Total: 22,502
  - Density: 114.96/km^{2} (297.74/sq mi)
- Time zone: UTC+01:00 (CET)
  - Summer (DST): UTC+02:00 (CEST)
- Vehicle registration: IZ
- Website: www.amt-kellinghusen.de

Kellinghusen is an Amt ("collective municipality") in the district of Steinburg, in Schleswig-Holstein, Germany. Its seat is in the town Kellinghusen. In the Amt is situated the second-least populated municipality of the nation, Wiedenborstel.

== History ==
Before 1 January 2008, when it was joined by the (previously Amt-free) town Kellinghusen and the municipalities Hohenlockstedt and Lockstedt from the former Amt Hohenlockstedt, it was named Kellinghusen-Land.

== Subdivision ==
The Amt Kellinghusen consists of the following municipalities:

1. Brokstedt
2. Fitzbek
3. Hennstedt
4. Hingstheide
5. Hohenlockstedt
6. Kellinghusen [town]
7. Lockstedt
8. Mühlenbarbek
9. Oeschebüttel
10. Poyenberg
11. Quarnstedt
12. Rade
13. Rosdorf
14. Sarlhusen
15. Störkathen
16. Wiedenborstel
17. Willenscharen
18. Wrist
19. Wulfsmoor
