= Störkathen =

- Municipality
- Coat of arms

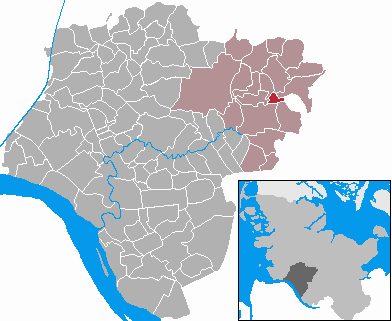
- Location of Störkathen within Steinburg district
- Interactive map of Störkathen
- Location within Germany Location within Schleswig-Holstein
- Coordinates: 53°59′N 9°45′E
- Country: Germany
- State: Schleswig-Holstein
- District: Steinburg
- Municipal assoc.: Kellinghusen

Government
  - Mayor: Yves Tischler

Area
  - Total: 2.03 km^{2} (0.78 sq mi)
- Elevation: 4 m (13 ft)

Population (2025-12-31)
  - Total: 89
  - Density: 44/km^{2} (110/sq mi)
- Time zone: UTC+01:00 (CET)
  - Summer (DST): UTC+02:00 (CEST)
- Postal codes: 25548
- Dialling codes: 04822
- Vehicle registration: IZ
- Website: www.kellinghusen.de

Störkathen is a municipality in the district of Steinburg, in Schleswig-Holstein, Germany.
