= Fitzbek =

- Municipality
- Coat of arms

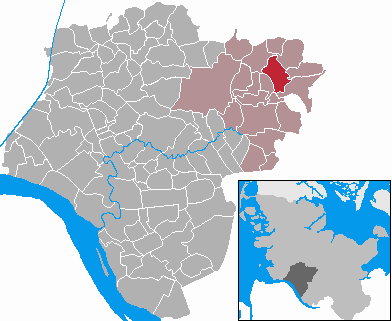
- Location of Fitzbek within Steinburg district
- Interactive map of Fitzbek
- Location within Germany Location within Schleswig-Holstein
- Coordinates: 54°0′N 9°46′E
- Country: Germany
- State: Schleswig-Holstein
- District: Steinburg
- Municipal assoc.: Kellinghusen

Government
  - Mayor: Axel Peters

Area
  - Total: 10.24 km^{2} (3.95 sq mi)
- Elevation: 4 m (13 ft)

Population (2025-12-31)
  - Total: 375
  - Density: 36.6/km^{2} (94.8/sq mi)
- Time zone: UTC+01:00 (CET)
  - Summer (DST): UTC+02:00 (CEST)
- Postal codes: 25579
- Dialling codes: 04324
- Vehicle registration: IZ
- Website: www.fitzbek.de

Fitzbek is a municipality in the district of Steinburg, in Schleswig-Holstein, Germany.
