= Hohenlockstedt =

- Municipality
- Coat of arms

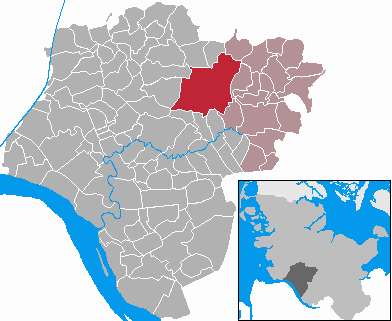
- Location of Hohenlockstedt within Steinburg district
- Interactive map of Hohenlockstedt
- Location within Germany Location within Schleswig-Holstein
- Coordinates: 53°58′N 9°37′E
- Country: Germany
- State: Schleswig-Holstein
- District: Steinburg
- Municipal assoc.: Kellinghusen
- Subdivisions: 6

Government
  - Mayor: Wolfgang Wein

Area
  - Total: 45.6 km^{2} (17.6 sq mi)
- Elevation: 17 m (56 ft)

Population (2025-12-31)
  - Total: 5,877
  - Density: 129/km^{2} (334/sq mi)
- Time zone: UTC+01:00 (CET)
  - Summer (DST): UTC+02:00 (CEST)
- Postal codes: 25551
- Dialling codes: 04822, 04826
- Vehicle registration: IZ
- Website: www.kellinghusen.de

Hohenlockstedt is a municipality in the district of Steinburg, in Schleswig-Holstein, Germany. It is situated approximately 8 km northeast of Itzehoe. Hohenlockstedt was formerly known as Lockstedter Lager and was used as a training area in Holstein until 1927.

Hohenlockstedt is part of the Amt ("collective municipality") Kellinghusen.

== History ==
Hohenlockstedt, formerly known as Lockstedter Lager military camp, was founded in 1872 as a training ground for the IX. Army Corps of the German army. In 1900, the German troop contingent for the mission against the Boxer Rebellion in China was set up, under the leadership of Alfred von Waldersee. A small wooded ridge nearby bears the name Waldersee-Höhe.

The military training area reached its greatest extent at the beginning of the First World War, when it covered an area of about 60 km², on which up to 18,000 soldiers were stationed.

From 1915, Finnish volunteers in the Jäger Movement were trained as soldiers at the Lockstedter Lager, and would later form the core of a new Finnish army. Finland was then part of the Russian Empire as a Grand Duchy. In 1917, Finland was able to gain independence, among other things with the help of these volunteers, who formed the elite core of the White army in the Finnish Civil War.

From 1927, it was made into a parish of the same name. During the Weimar Republic, the camp grounds were a rallying point of various far-right groups, including Freikorps groups and Nazis. The place was considered the cradle of the Schleswig-Holstein SA.

Because of its bad reputation, the community changed its name to Hohenlockstedt in 1956.

== Sister cities ==
- Lapua, Finland
