= Mühlenbarbek =

- Municipality
- Coat of arms

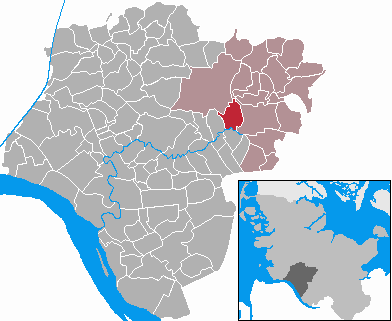
- Location of Mühlenbarbek within Steinburg district
- Interactive map of Mühlenbarbek
- Location within Germany Location within Schleswig-Holstein
- Coordinates: 53°57′N 9°40′E
- Country: Germany
- State: Schleswig-Holstein
- District: Steinburg
- Municipal assoc.: Kellinghusen

Government
  - Mayor: Thies Rehder

Area
  - Total: 8.66 km^{2} (3.34 sq mi)
- Elevation: 1 m (3.3 ft)

Population (2025-12-31)
  - Total: 253
  - Density: 29.2/km^{2} (75.7/sq mi)
- Time zone: UTC+01:00 (CET)
  - Summer (DST): UTC+02:00 (CEST)
- Postal codes: 25548
- Dialling codes: 04822
- Vehicle registration: IZ
- Website: www.kellinghusen.de

Mühlenbarbek is a municipality in the district of Steinburg, in Schleswig-Holstein, Germany.
