= Otto Bräutigam =

German lawyer and diplomat

Otto Bräutigam (14 May 1895 – 30 April 1992) was a German diplomat and lawyer who worked for the Auswärtiges Amt (German Foreign Office) and for the Reich Ministry for the Occupied Eastern Territories, which was led by Alfred Rosenberg, in Nazi Germany. In that position, Bräutigam was involved in the Holocaust, but notably voiced opposition to the Reich's brutal policies in Eastern Europe. After World War II, he joined the Auswärtiges Amt of West Germany.

== Early life and career ==
Born in Wesel, Bräutigam studied law in 1913 and 1914 at Grenoble, Oxford and Strasbourg. He fought in World War I and finished his studies in Münster in 1919.

In 1920, he joined the Auswärtiges Amt. In 1922, he received his doctorate and worked in various German embassies. In 1928 Bräutigam was sent to Moscow, where he met Alfred Rosenberg.

== World War II ==
According to William L. Shirer's The Rise and Fall of the Third Reich, a 13-page document from Berlin was presented at the Nuremberg Trials that showed that Bräutigam had written several requests to integrate the local factions into the Wehrmacht and to start by avoiding unnecessary cruelty to the local population. He had noted:

...when we came to the east we found the people of east Europe, ready to be our partners in destroying Bolshevism we need to re-place our cards. Promise them something that guarantee their future... due to our cruel policies the Russian nationalist are uniting with the Bolsheviks against us.

It did not take the population of the east long to recognize that we are not there to destroy Bolshevism, but we are there to replace it.

Bräutigam's top-secret report to his superiors in the Reichskommissariat Ostland fell on deaf ears. Shirer described the report as "daring and exceptional" in which Bräutigam had written:

We now experience the grotesque spectacle that after the tremendous starvation of prisoners of war, millions of foreign laborers must be recruited to fill the gaps which have appeared in Germany. With the usual unlimited abuse of Slav people, "recruiting" methods were used which can only be compared with the blackest periods of the slave trade. (They are allowed only the most limited education, and can be given no welfare services.) We are interested in feeding them only insofar as they are still capable (and they are given to understand that in every aspect we regard them as inferior).

— Otto Bräutigam, 25 October 1942

Goebbels and Heinrich Himmler welcomed the idea by 1942. Pyotr Krasnov and Andrei Shkuro requested permission from Goebbels to fight along with Nazi Germany. They had mustered a Cossack force, largely from Soviet prisoners-of-war in German captivity.

The forces fell under the overall command of Helmuth von Pannwitz. The following year, the 1st Cossack Division and Ukrainian Liberation Army were supported or created. The Cossack units were formed to fight the Bolsheviks, but Red Army had already taken most of the German-held territory.

== Prosecution ==
At the Nuremberg Trials, Bräutigam was not charged but acted as a witness against prominent members of Nazi Germany.

In 1950, Bräutigam was charged with multiple murder in Nürnberg-Fürth but was found not guilty, like for other former Nazis at the time.

== West German Foreign Office ==
In 1953, Bräutigam joined the West German Auswärtiges Amt (Foreign Office). After more evidence of his Nazi past came to the light, he was temporarily suspended in 1956. In 1957, however, a report concluded that he had "attempted to avoid the killing" and so he was reinstated in his position in 1958.

In 1959, he received the Order of Merit of the Federal Republic of Germany. He worked as consul general in Hong Kong until his retirement in 1960.
