= Kellinghusen =

- Town
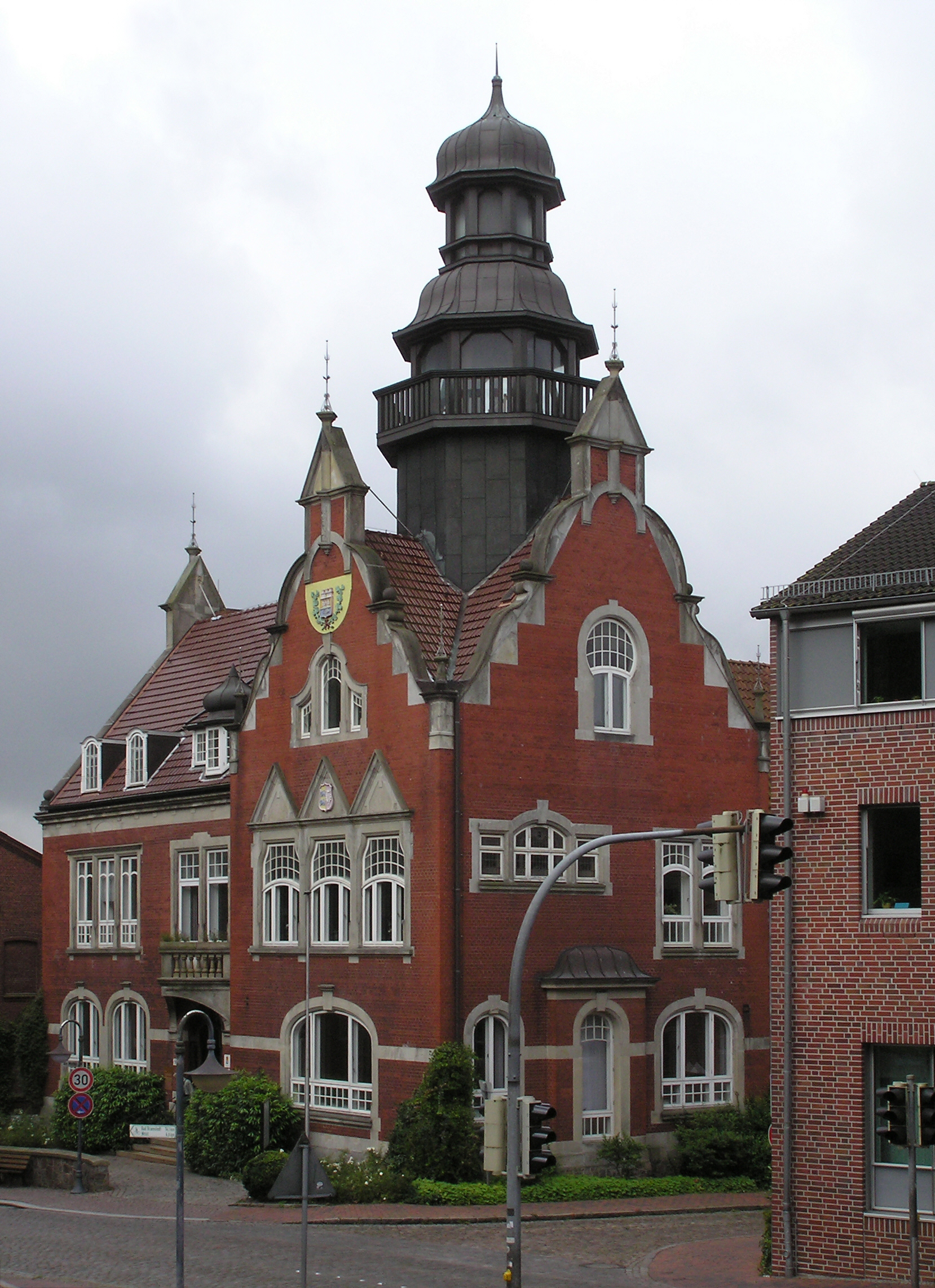
- Town hall

- Coat of arms

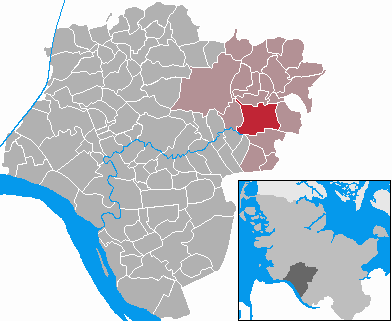
- Location of Kellinghusen within Steinburg district
- Interactive map of Kellinghusen
- Location within Germany Location within Schleswig-Holstein
- Coordinates: 53°57′N 009°43′E
- Country: Germany
- State: Schleswig-Holstein
- District: Steinburg
- Municipal assoc.: Kellinghusen

Government
  - Mayor: Axel Pietsch

Area
  - Total: 18.81 km^{2} (7.26 sq mi)
- Elevation: 3 m (9.8 ft)

Population (2025-12-31)
  - Total: 8,091
  - Density: 430.1/km^{2} (1,114/sq mi)
- Time zone: UTC+01:00 (CET)
  - Summer (DST): UTC+02:00 (CEST)
- Postal codes: 25548
- Dialling codes: 04822
- Vehicle registration: IZ
- Website: www.kellinghusen.de

Kellinghusen (German pronunciation: [kɛlɪŋˈhuːzn̩]) is a town in the district of Steinburg in the Bundesland of Schleswig-Holstein.

== Geography ==
Kellinghusen is located northeast of Itzehoe on both sides of the Stör River. The federal highway Bundesstraße 206 passes Kellinghusen in the south. Kellinghusen is connected with the Bundesautobahn 7 in the east and the Bundesautobahn 23 in the west. Prospectively Kellinghusen will be connected with the Bundesautobahn 20 in the south. The next Railroad stations are in Wrist, Bad Bramstedt and Itzehoe. The Luftkurort Kellinghusen, a health resort, is in the countryside of Holstein and a gateway to the 380-square-kilometer Aukrug Nature Park. The slightly hilly landscape of this nature park, with a favorable climate of forests, ponds, heathland, and moorland, serves as a popular holiday destination.

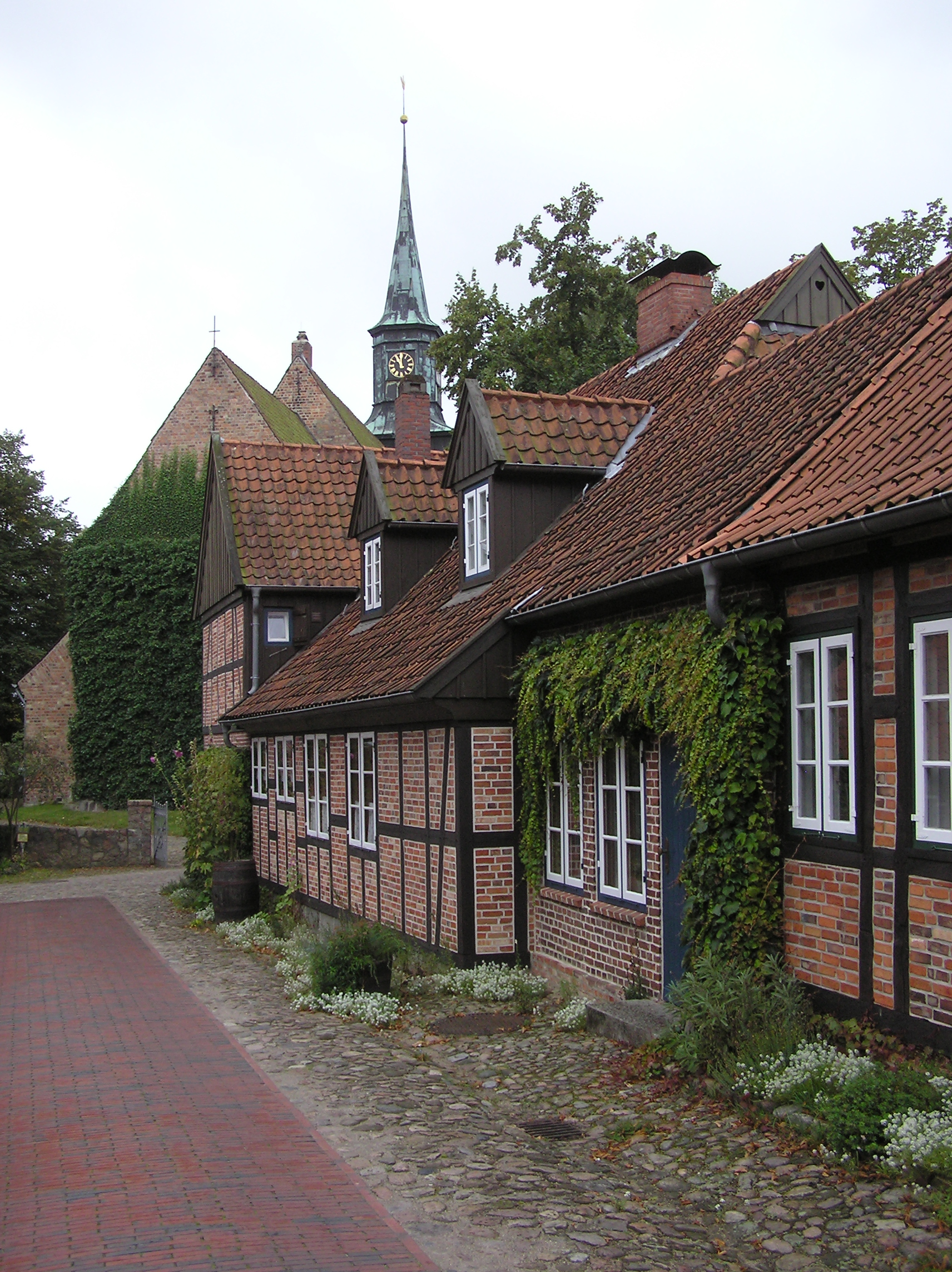
Kellinghusen

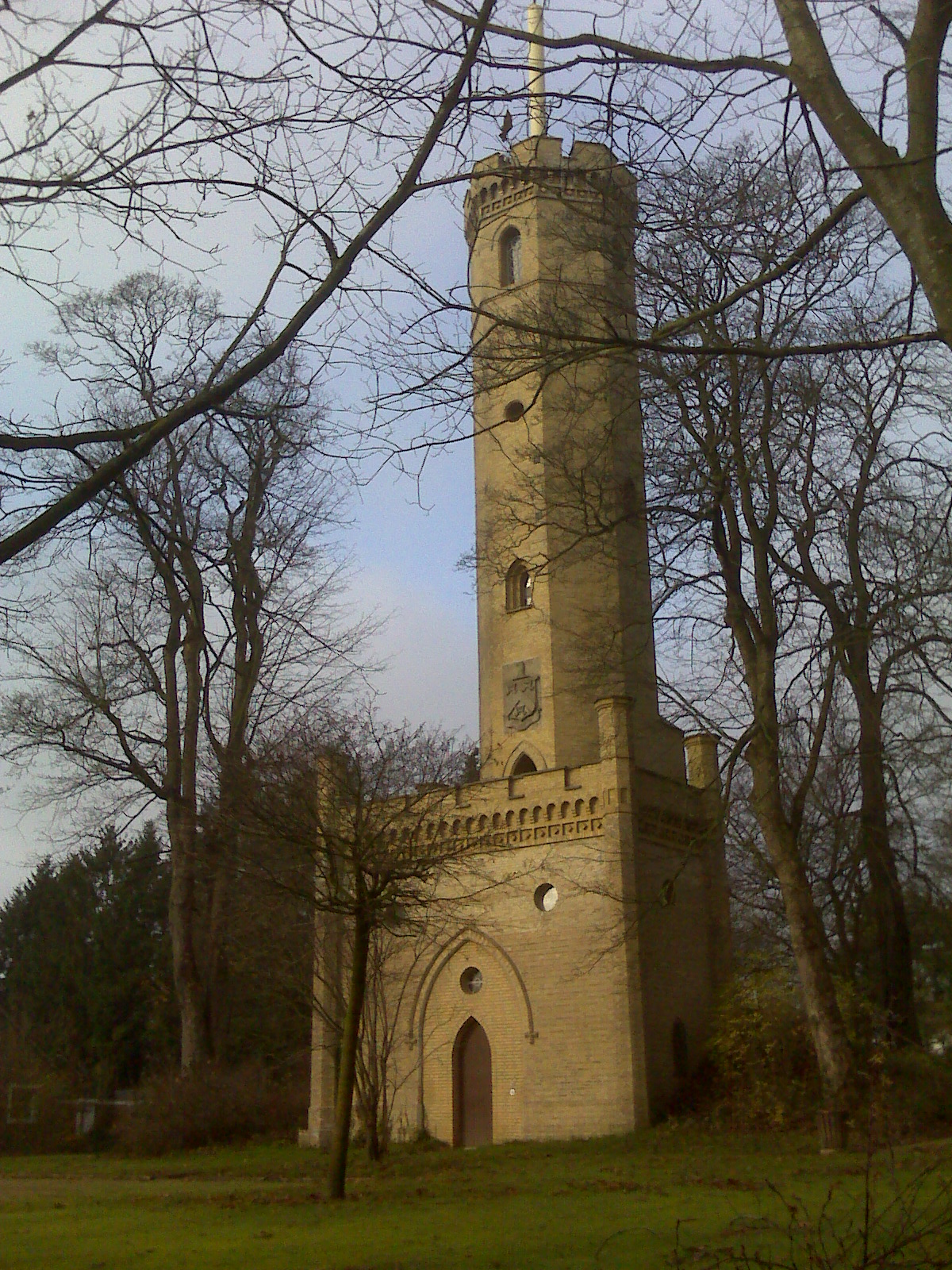
Luisenberger Turm (Luisenberg tower)

== History ==
Kellinghusen was first mentioned in the 11th century and became known during the 18th century for its faience. The town, which has existed since the time of Charlemagne, was first known as Kellinghusen around the year 1148, as evidenced by the name "Thoto of Kerleggehusen." The residents were primarily craftsmen, traders, and manufacturers. Plentiful clay in the area favored the establishment of faience factories.

From 1964 - 2009 Kellinghusen was one base of the Bundeswehr. During the Cold War an arsenal of nuclear weaponry of the United States Armed Forces was situated in Kellinghusen.

== Politics ==
=== Honorary Mayor ===
- 1945–1946 Emil Staben (SPD)
- 1946 Hermann Nau (SPD)
- 1946–1948 Emil Staben (SPD)
- 1948–1950 Otto Staack (DWB)
- since 2010 Axel Pietsch (BFK)

=== Mayor ===
- 1950–1953 Gerhard Muhs (non-party)
- 1953–1971 Paul Jeske (non-party)
- 1971–1976 Herbert Hinz (CDU)
- 1977–1982 Helmut Hagedorn (CDU)
- 1982–1992 Franz-Joseph Kuß (non-party)
- 1992–2003 Siegfried Kalis (SPD)
- 2004–2010 Helga Maria Nießen (non-party)

== Districts ==
- Feldhusen
- Mühlenbek
- Overndorf
- Grönhude
- Rensing
- Vorbrügge

== Born in Kellinghusen ==
- Wilhelmine Kähler (1864–1941), politician (SPD), Member of the Reichstag, Member of the Landtag (Prussia) and trade unionist
- Albert Behnke (1904–1994), horticulturist, founder of Behnke's nurseries in Beltsville, USA.
