= Stadler FLIRT =

Swiss built multiple unit passenger trainset

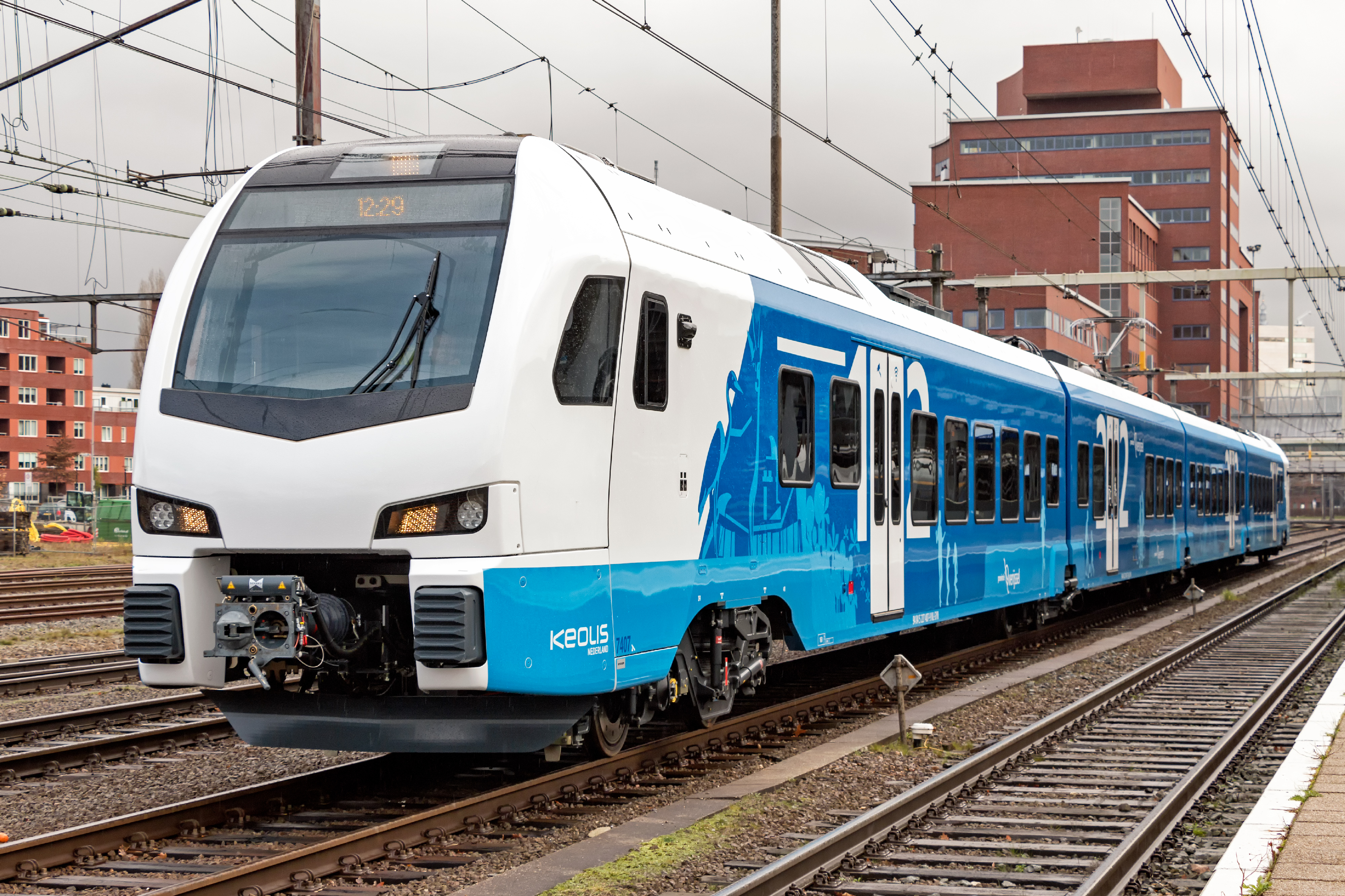
- Stadler FLIRT of Keolis Nederland
- Manufacturer: Stadler Rail
- Constructed: 2004–present
- Number built: Over 3000 sold (as of December 2025)

Specifications
- Car length: 15,700 mm (51 ft 6 in); 17,500 mm (57 ft 5 in) (not including cab)
- Width: 2,820 mm (9 ft 3 in); 2,880 mm (9 ft 5 in); Non-standard: UK: 2,720 mm (8 ft 11 in); NSB/VR: 3,200 mm (10 ft 6 in); Broad gauge: 3,480 mm (11 ft 5 in)
- Height: 4,120 to 4,380 mm (13 ft 6 in to 14 ft 4 in)
- Platform height: 550 to 1,200 mm (22 to 47 in)
- Entry: Level
- Maximum speed: 127 to 200 km/h (79 to 124 mph)
- Traction system: ABB IGBT-VVVF
- Acceleration: 0.6 to 1.3 m/s^{2} (1.3 to 2.9 mph/s)
- Electric systems: Overhead line: 25 kV 50 Hz AC; 15 kV 16.7 Hz AC; 1,500 V DC; 3,000 V DC
- Current collection: Pantograph, contact shoe
- Multiple working: Up to 4, cross-type operation with KISS
- Track gauge: 1,435 mm (4 ft 8 1/2 in); 1,520 mm (4 ft 11 27/32 in); Non-standard: 1,067 mm (3 ft 6 in); 1,524 mm (5 ft); 1,600 mm (5 ft 3 in); 1,668 mm (5 ft 5 21/32 in)

Stadler FLIRT (Fast Light Innovative Regional Train) is a family of passenger multiple unit trainsets made by Stadler Rail of Switzerland. The trains have a maximum speed of 127 to 200 kilometres per hour (79 to 124 mph).

While the standard FLIRT is an EMU powered by overhead lines, a modular PowerPack car can be added for off-wire operation. The PowerPack may contain diesel engines, hydrogen fuel cells, batteries, or combinations thereof, while traction remains fully electric. This modular setup allows operation on both electrified and non-electrified routes.

The FLIRT was originally developed for the Swiss Federal Railways and first delivered in 2004. The design proved highly successful and adaptable, leading to orders for more than 2,750 units from operators across 24 countries. The first bi-mode FLIRT units, combining overhead electric operation with diesel power packs, were ordered by Italy's Aosta Valley region in 2015. Tri-mode versions, combining diesel, electric, and battery operation, were first ordered by Transport for Wales in 2018. The first hydrogen fuel-cell variant was ordered in 2019 for Arrow in San Bernardino County, California, United States.

== Specifications ==
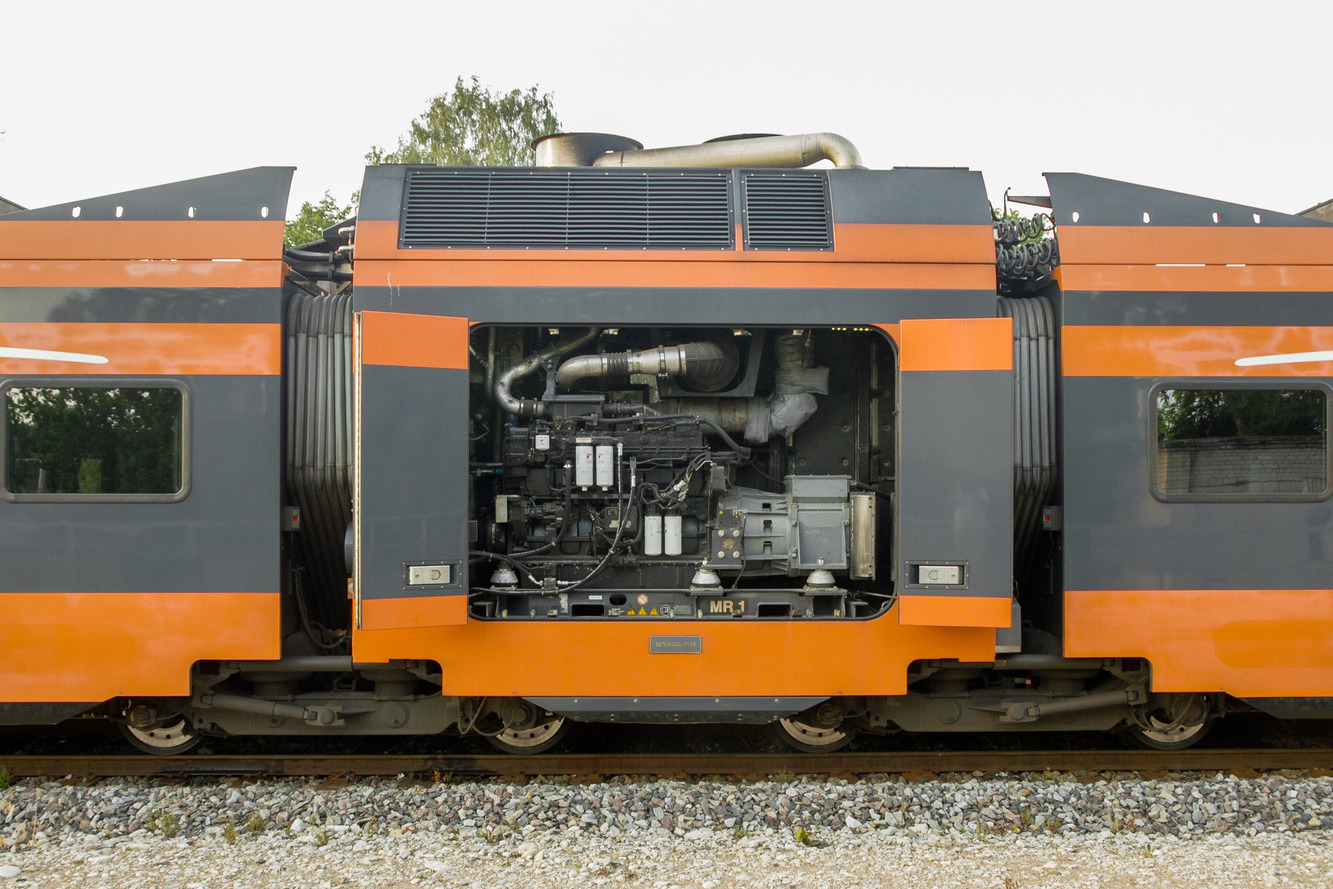
PowerPack car with its doors opened showing the diesel engine and generator, and its Jacobs bogies shared between adjacent coaches

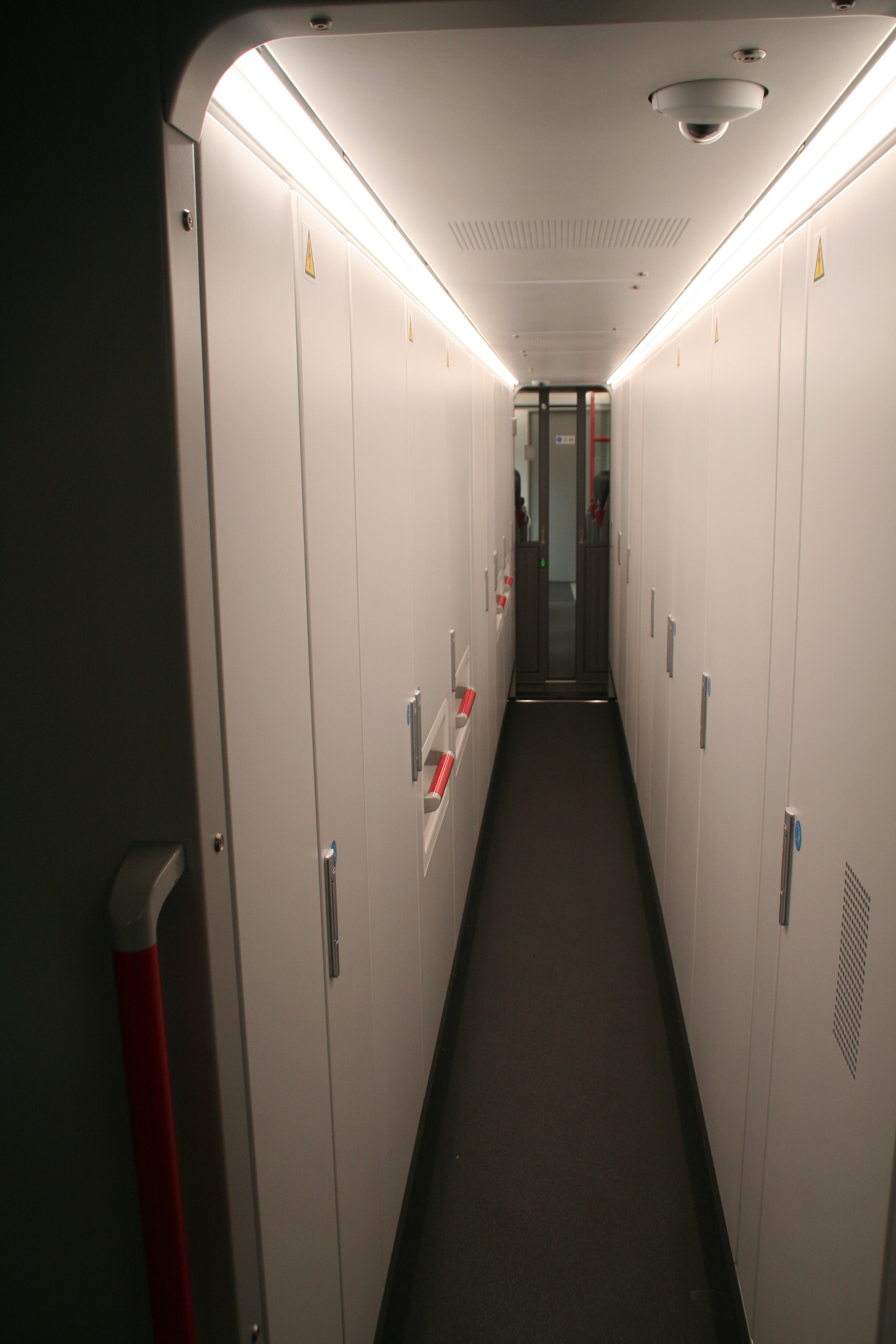
The interior gangway of a PowerPack car which allows passengers to move between the two sections of the train

Although the earliest versions of the FLIRT physically resemble the preceding Stadler GTW series—designed for lower-speed local services—the FLIRT was developed for higher-speed regional operations and has since also replaced the GTW in many local roles.

FLIRT trainsets are highly modular in design and can be configured with two to six passenger carriages, with or without an additional PowerPack car. Electric variants are available for all common power supply systems, both AC and DC, and for standard- and broad-gauge networks. Automatic couplers at both ends allow up to four trainsets to operate in multiple, including cross-operation with Stadler's double-deck KISS units.

The FLIRT can use Jacobs bogies shared between adjacent coaches, conventional bogies, or a combination of both, and features wide, walk-through gangways. It can be built with an entirely high-floor layout or a combination of high- and up to 90% low-floor sections. To provide level boarding at most stations, the floor height at the entrances can range from 550 to 1,200 millimetres (22 to 47 in). Each side of the vehicle has one or two wide, bi-parting sliding doors per carriage. Passenger areas can be fitted out to include toilets, food service areas, or sleeping compartments, depending on operator needs.

While the standard FLIRT operates as an EMU drawing power from overhead lines, the design allows for the addition of a modular PowerPack that provides off-wire capability. These cars can house diesel engines driving electric generators (creating a diesel multiple unit, DMU), hydrogen fuel cells (zero-emission multiple unit, ZEMU), battery packs (battery electric multiple unit, BEMU), or combinations of these systems. Regardless of configuration, all FLIRT variants use electric traction motors on the powered axles, with the PowerPack serving only as a source of electrical power. This modular design enables operation on non-electrified routes or in mixed electrified and non-electrified networks.

The train's traction system is highly redundant with up to four independent drivetrains. Compartments between the driving cab and the passenger saloon contain the primary and auxiliary IGBT-based traction converters supplied by ABB, which control the induction traction motors located in the bogies directly beneath. This configuration is used in all FLIRT variants, whether or not a PowerPack is installed. On shorter configurations of two carriages, only one bogie may be powered. On longer configurations of five or six carriages, a third powered bogie may be added at the centre of the train. Each powered bogie typically provides a continuous output of 660 to 1,000 kilowatts (890 to 1,340 hp) and a short-term maximum of 1,200 to 1,750 kW (1,610 to 2,350 hp). Depending on configuration, length, and weight, FLIRT units achieve maximum speeds between 127 and 200 kilometres per hour (79 and 124 mph), with acceleration rates ranging from 0.6 to 1.3 m/s^{2} (1.3 to 2.9 mph/s).

FLIRT trainsets hold world records for the longest journeys completed using alternative propulsion. A battery-powered FLIRT set the record for the longest distance travelled in pure battery mode, covering 244 kilometres (152 mi) in Germany. On 22 March 2024, a hydrogen-powered FLIRT set a record by travelling 2,803 kilometres (1,742 mi) without refuelling or recharging at the Transportation Technology Center in the United States.

== Operators ==
=== Algeria ===
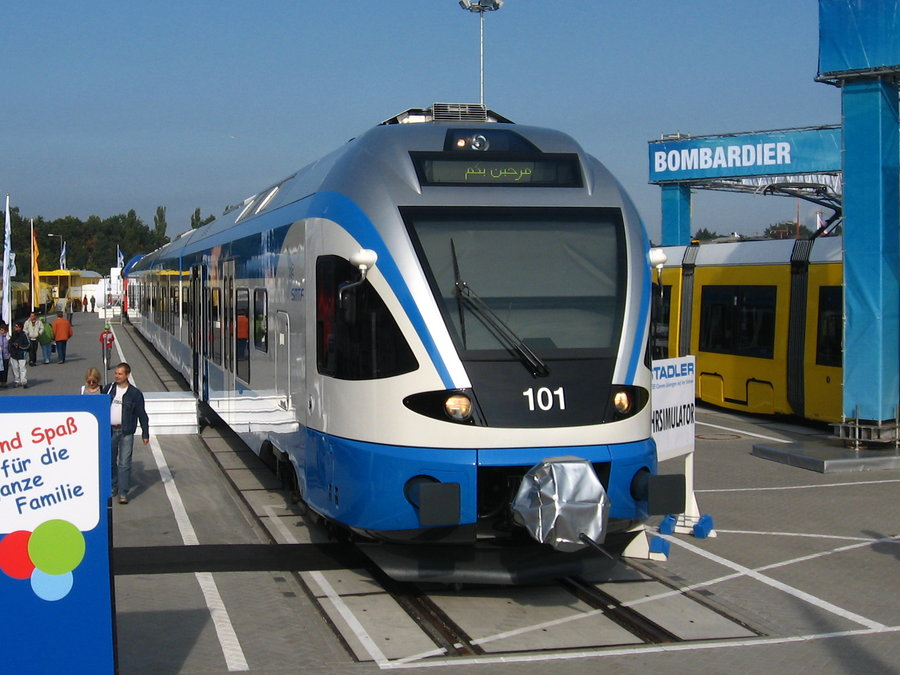
SNTF Class 541 FLIRT at InnoTrans 2008

On 18 March 2006, the Algerian national railway operator SNTF announced that it had ordered 64 four-car EMUs for operation on the Algiers suburban rail network. The trains were delivered between 2008 and 2010. They are designated by the SNTF as the Class 541, with series numbers 541-101 to 541-164.

=== Azerbaijan ===
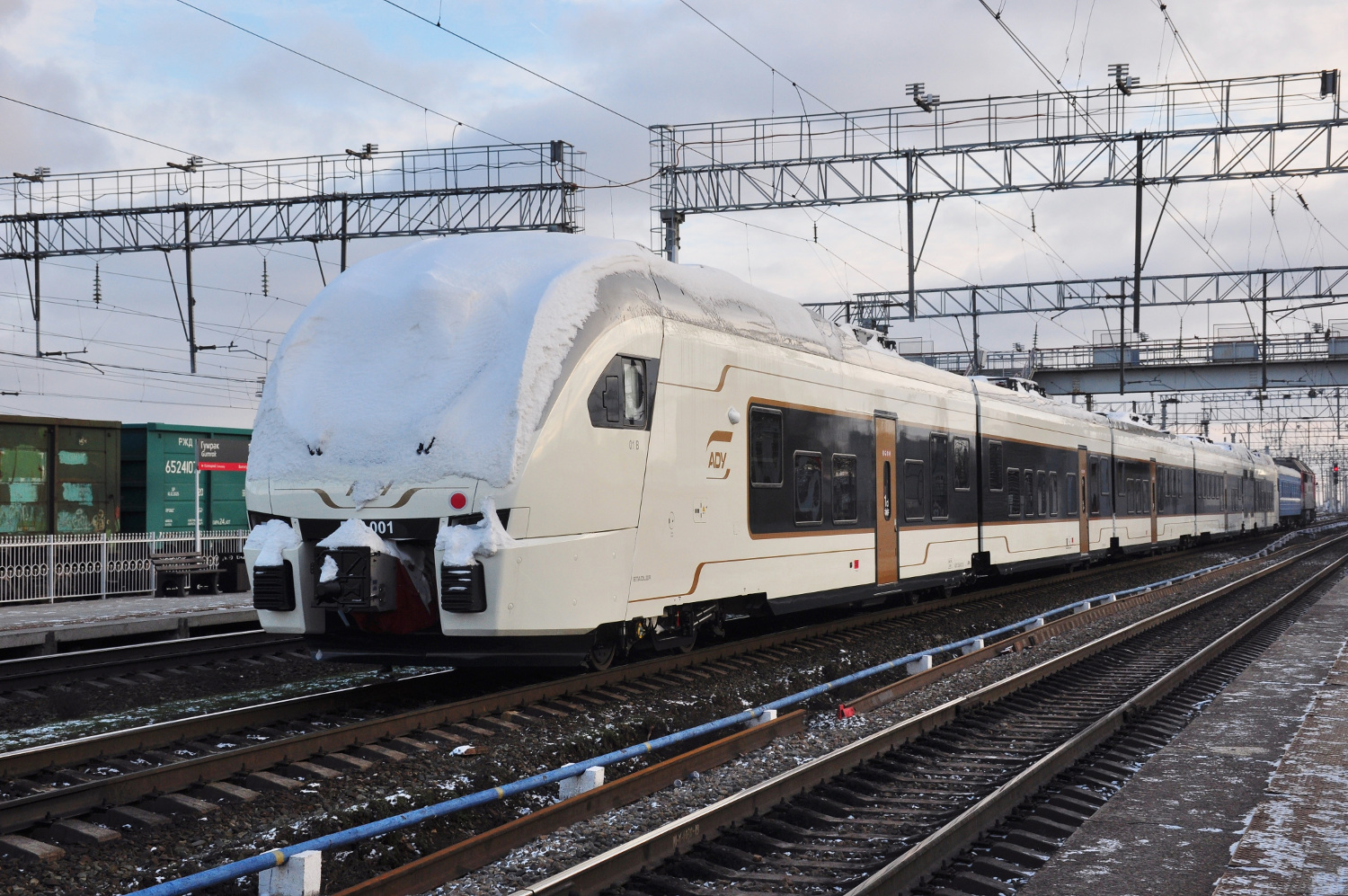
Azerbaijani DŞ1-001 DMU during its transportation in Russia

In November 2019, it was announced that Azərbaycan Dəmir Yolları (Azerbaijan Railways) had placed a €115 million order for ten Russian-gauge Stadler FLIRT units in various configurations, for delivery to begin in 2022.

The order specification is as follows:

- Three EMUs for regional trains
- Three EMUs for inter-regional trains
- Four DŞ1-class DMUs for inter-regional trains

Train length is to range between 93 and 107 m (305 ft 1 3/8 in and 351 ft 5/8 in), with capacity varying from 236 to 271 passengers.

Because the Azerbaijan Railway is currently converting the electrification voltage of many lines on its network from 3 kV DC to 25 kV AC, the diesel fleet will be introduced first, allowing the service to be upheld during this conversion process.

In December 2023, the four DMUs were delivered to Azerbaijan Railways. The first EMUs followed in summer 2024.

=== Belarus ===
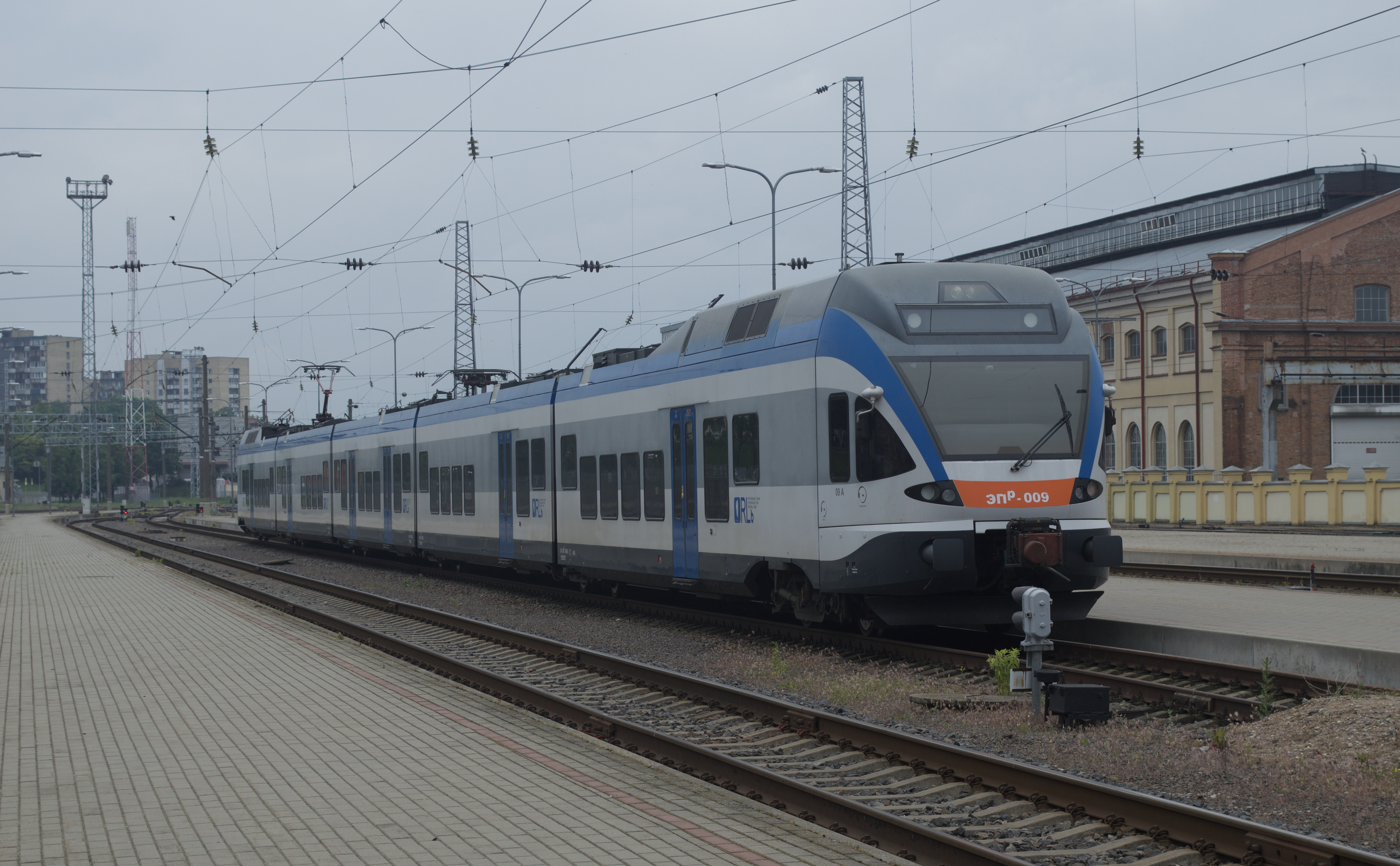
Belarusian Railways FLIRT at Vilnius train station

Ten Russian-gauge units were delivered to the Belarusian Railways in 2011. Six more were delivered from 2013 to 2014.

The trains are mostly used on various suburban routes around Minsk, such as Minsk-Pasažyrski to Minsk National Airport. The Stadler FLIRT trains are also used as inter-regional transport in Belarus, on the routes Minsk–Homieĺ, and Minsk–Brest.

Two Stadler FLIRT units with an interior optimised for longer distance (EP^{m}-class) were delivered to Belarus in 2015 to 2016, and in January 2019, ten more of these trains were ordered for delivery in 2020.

=== Canada ===
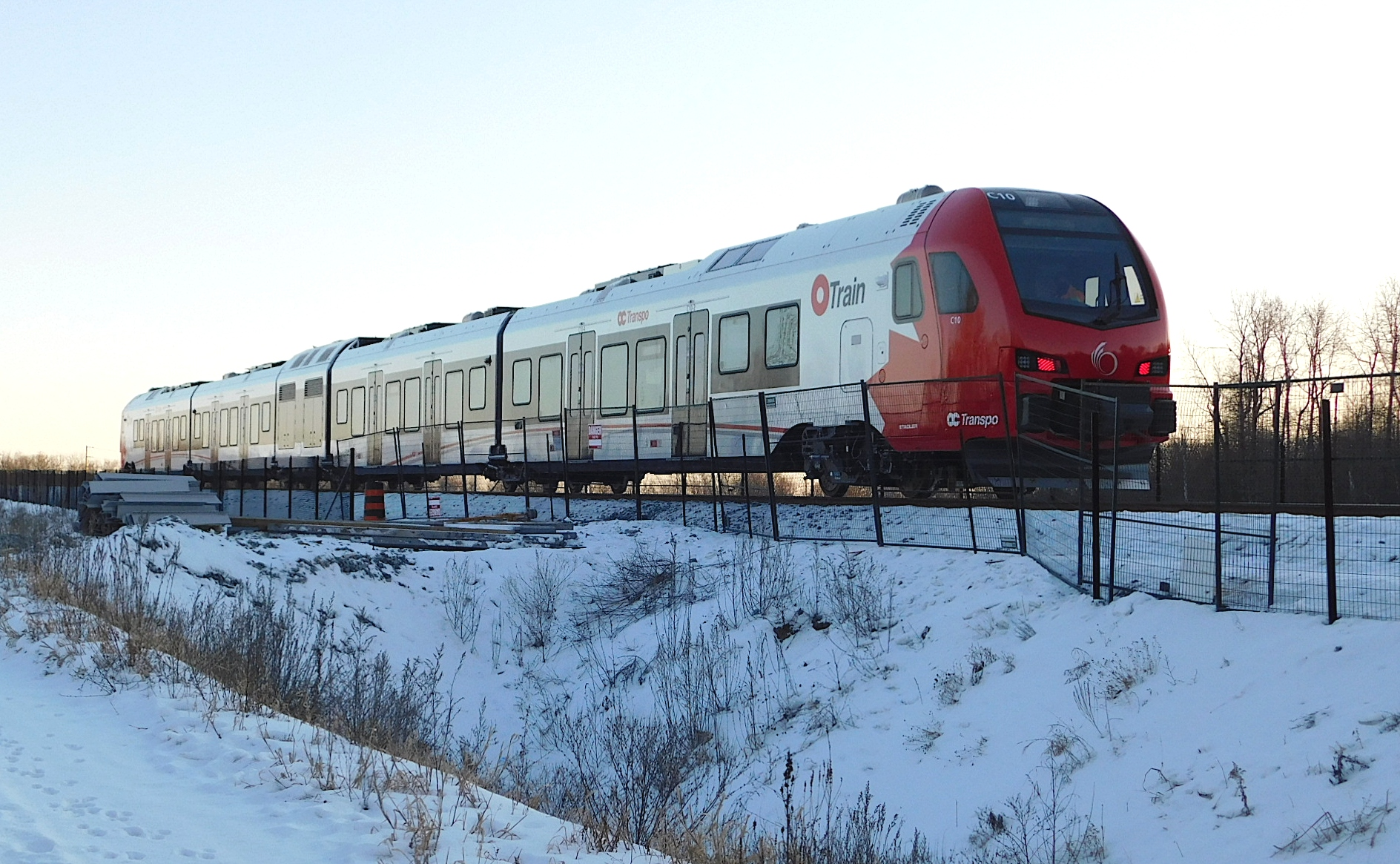
OC Transpo FLIRT

The city of Ottawa put 7 Stadler FLIRTs into service on O-Train Line 2 in 2025 to increase capacity, partially replacing the Coradia LINTs, which now primarily run on Line 4.

Line 2 is a combination of frequent rapid transit and suburban regional rail, serving both as the inner city's main north-south route and also railway to the Riverside South suburb. However, unlike most Stadler FLIRTs which are heavy rail regional trains, these versions of the Stadler FLIRT are smaller diesel-electric light rail vehicles that provide a light rail service to be consistent with the rest of Ottawa's O-Train light rail system.

=== Czech Republic ===
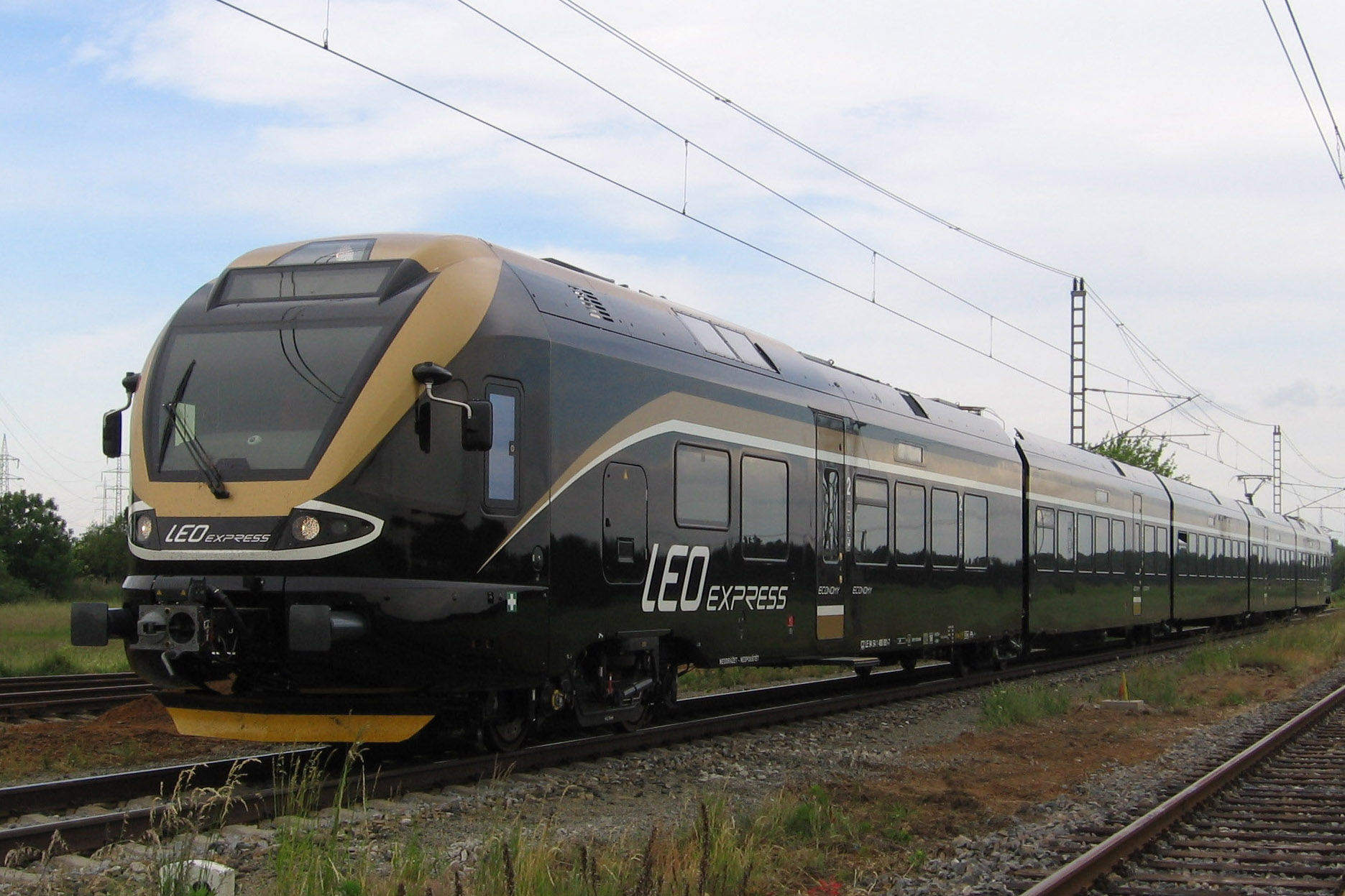
Stadler FLIRT of Czech private rail operator Leo Express on the test circuit in Cerhenice, the Czech Republic

The Czech private operator LEO Express ordered five units. Units are modified as InterCity trains. All five units have operated on the Prague–Ostrava line since December 2012. Since December 2013 one unit is operated on the Prague–Staré Město u Uherského Hradiště and since December 2014 one unit is operated on the international route Prague–Košice (Slovak Republic).

=== Denmark ===
On 9 October 2024, the local railway operator Lokaltog formally signed a contract for the supply of 14 two-car units of the battery–electric Akku model with an option for 10 more. They are scheduled to be delivered in 2028.

=== Estonia ===
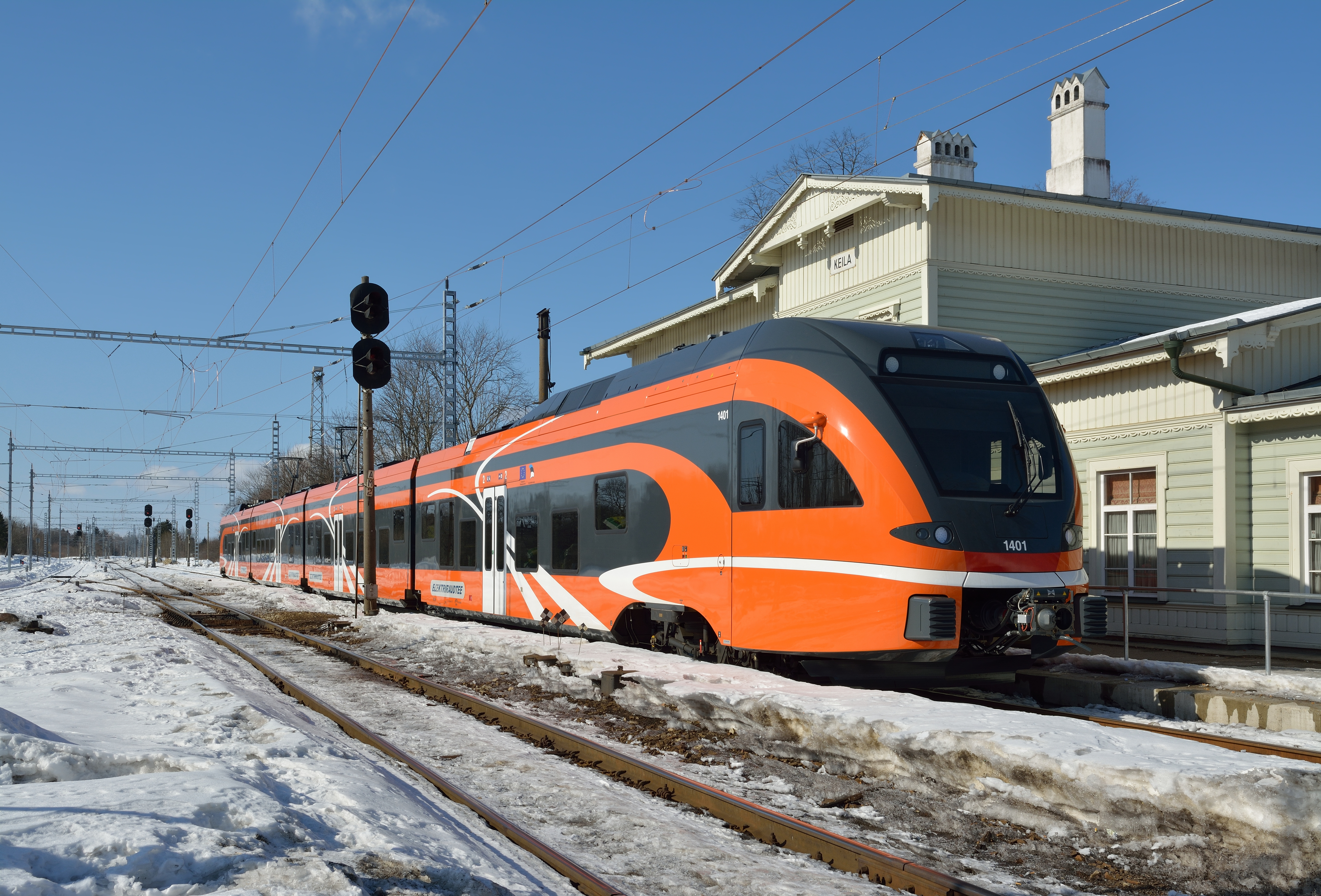
Estonian Stadler FLIRT EMU 1401 at Keila

Elron ordered 18 electric (6 four-car and 12 three-car) and 20 diesel (6 four-car, 8 three-car and 6 two-car) broad-gauged trains. By June 2014 all 38 trains were delivered. This has been the first time FLIRT DMUs were produced. First five trains went into service on 1 July 2013 and by January 2014 all old trains were replaced by the new ones. On 16 April 2014 one of the new DMUs that had been operating for just five months had an accident near Raasiku, a collision with a truck. The unit was badly damaged. It went back into service in 2015, and two damaged carriages were replaced. In November 2014, Elron initiated an investigation into suspected flaws in some diesel trains. Two different build flaws were found in many of the trains and faulty components were replaced under warranty.

=== Finland ===
81 four-section 1,524 mm (5 ft) broad-gauged FLIRT units, classified as Sm5 in the Finnish system, have been ordered by Pääkaupunkiseudun Junakalusto Oy (a joint venture between the cities of Helsinki, Espoo, Vantaa and Kauniainen) for service on the Helsinki commuter rail network. The Sm5 units are leased by Pääkaupunkiseudun junakalusto to the Helsinki Regional Transport Authority, but they are currently operated by the VR Group. The initial order in 2006 was for 32 trainsets. 9 further units were ordered in 2011 and 34 further units in 2014.

The first Sm5 unit arrived in Finland on 11 November 2008. Following preliminary testing the first unit was displayed to the public in Helsinki on 17 December 2008. During the remainder of 2008 and for most of 2009 the Sm5 units were extensively tested in different parts of Finland. The first unit entered passenger service on 18 November 2009.

In November 2022, VR Group, the country's national rail operator, awarded Stadler Rail the contract to manufacture 20 new FLIRT 4 EMUs (but based on FLIRT G and without Jacobs bogies) with an additional option for 50 trainsets, classified as Sm7, for longer-distance VR commuter rail services. These trains will be partly manufactured in Switzerland with final assembly taking place in Poland and Belarus, and they are expected to enter service in spring 2026.

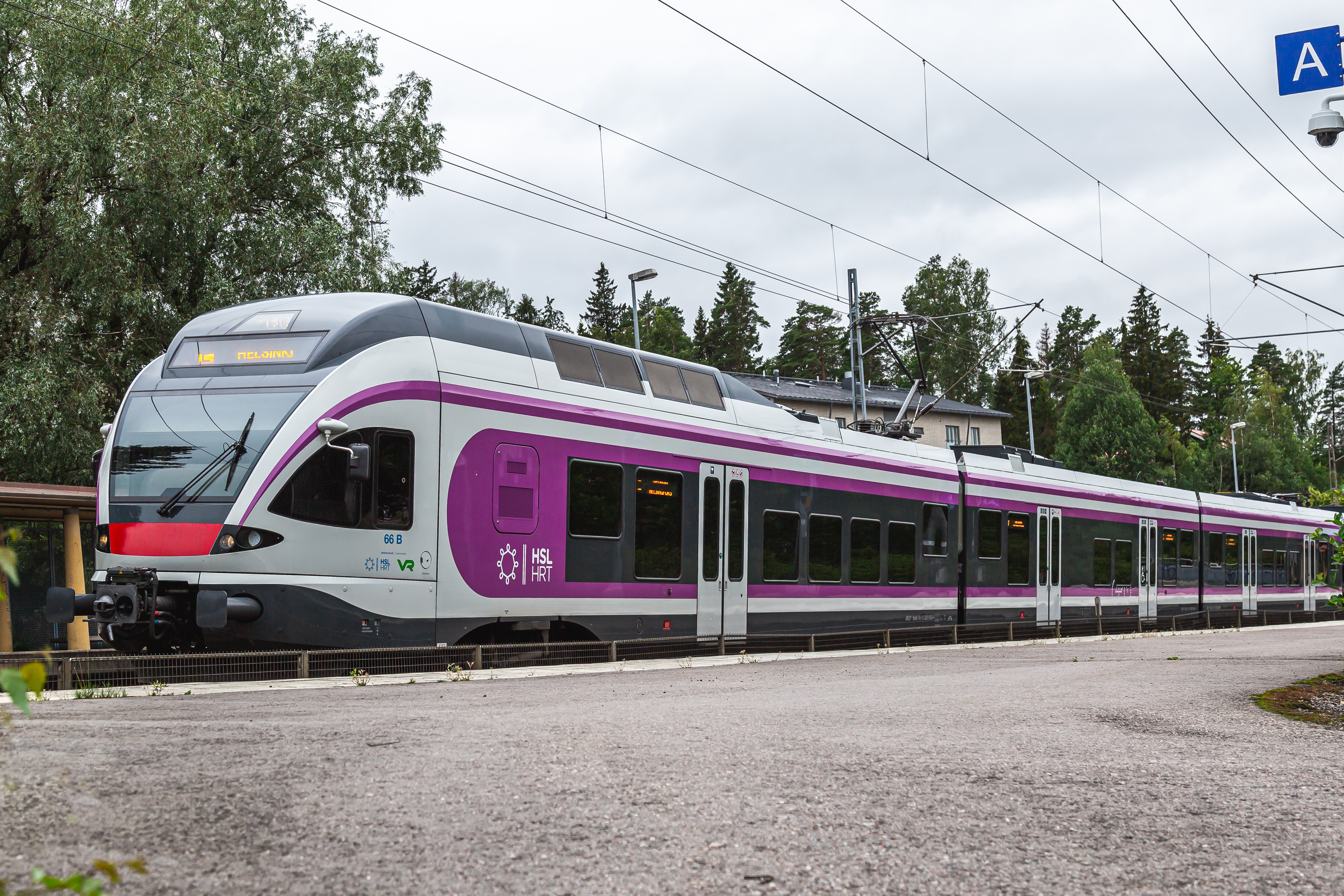
Class Sm5 EMU in Tuomarila.

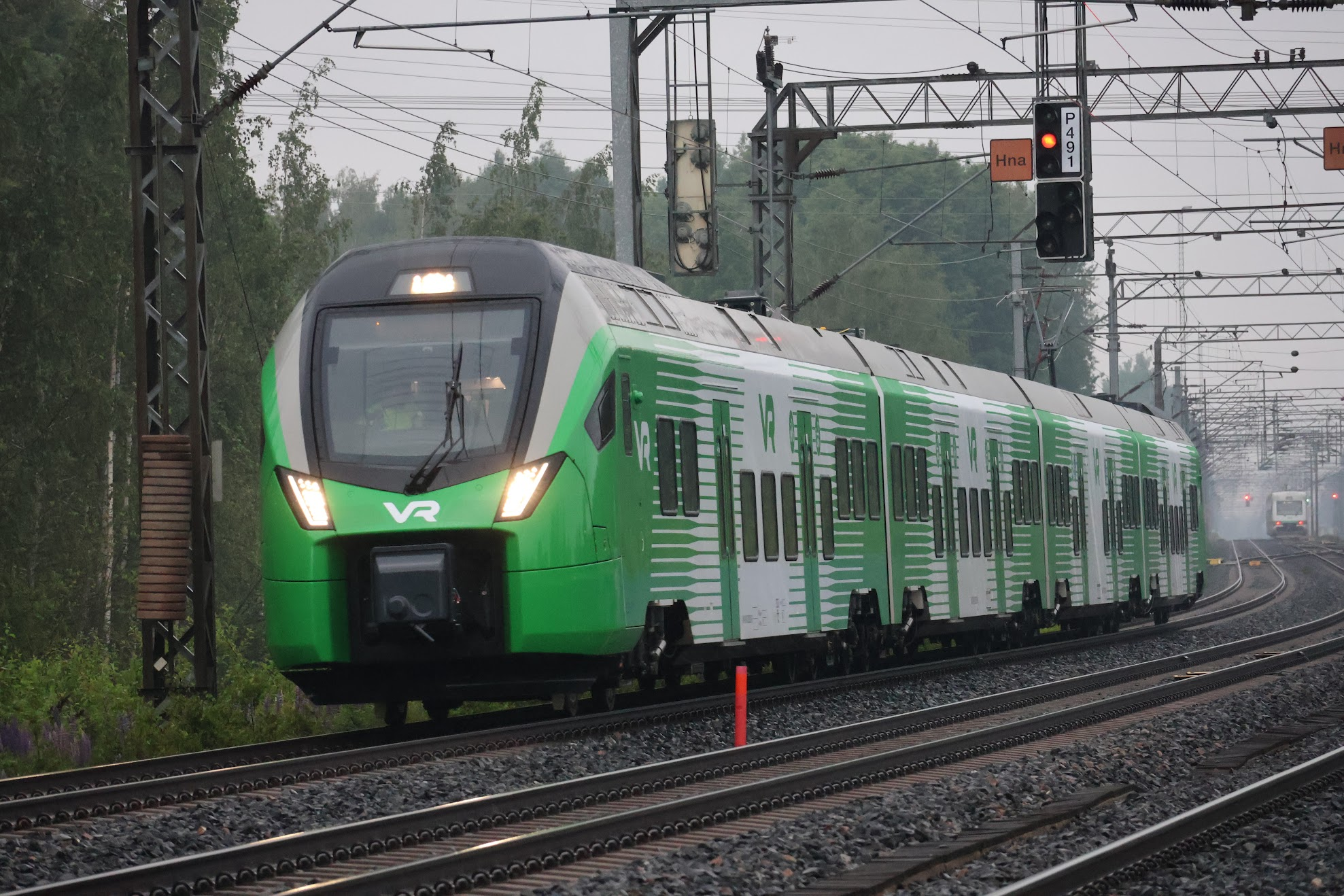
VR Class Sm7 EMU

=== Germany ===
The Cantus Verkehrsgesellschaft, a joint subsidiary of Hessische Landesbahn and Hamburger Hochbahn, became the first German FLIRT operator when they received their first train in 2006. Their fleet consists of fourteen three-car and six four-car units.

Since December 2007 Abellio Rail NRW has operated nine three-car and eight two-car FLIRT trains for regional routes between Essen, Hagen, Iserlohn and Siegen. This was the first time that a FLIRT with only two sections was ordered.

Also since December 2007 WestfalenBahn uses fourteen three-car and five five-car trains for trains services in the Teutoburg Forest region.

In 2006 DB Regio, a subsidiary of Deutsche Bahn ordered five five-section vehicles for regional services on the German east coast. The trains were delivered in August 2007 and, until December 2019, were used on the routes Rostock–Stralsund–Lietzow–Sassnitz (Hanse-Express), Sassnitz–Stralsund and Binz–Lietzow. Since October 2020, they run the RB17 (Wismar – Ludwigslust).

The biggest order from Germany so far came in October 2006 from the leasing company Angel Trains Europa when they ordered 25 four-car FLIRT trains. All 25 units have been leased to Eurobahn who uses them on the Hellweg Network in North Rhine-Westphalia. Only a year later, in November 2007, Angel Trains ordered four more four-car and fourteen five-car trains that will also be used by Eurobahn. In 2017, Eurobahn also took over the WestfalenBahn operation of the Teutoburger-Wald-Network, taking over 18 FLIRT 1 units, as well as ordering eight new FLIRT 3 units.

On the InnoTrans 2008, a trade fair focused on rail transport, Vias announced their order for twelve four-section and seven three-section units. Starting in December 2010, the trains were put on the Frankfurt–Koblenz route. The same year, the Hessische Landesbahn (HLB) started to operate three three- and five six-car FLIRT units on the Frankfurt – Gießen – Siegen line.

Starting in December 2013, the Bayerische Oberlandbahn, called Bayerische Regiobahn (BRB) since 2020, uses three three-car and 28 six-car FLIRTs for their Meridian services, which run between Munich-Salzburg and Kufstein. Since August 2014, the ownership of the trains was transferred to AlphaTrains, only to be leased back for the Meridian.

Go-Ahead Germany ordered 45 units in 2016 for delivery in 2019.

Transdev ordered 64 three-car units in November 2018, planned to enter service in 2021 on Hanover S-Bahn lines. In June 2019, Transdev subsidiary NordWestBahn awarded Stadler a €100m order to supply 16 FLIRT electric multiple-units for the Bremen/Niedersachsen S-Bahn services. The trains will enter service starting December 2022.

In July 2019, Schleswig-Holstein rail authority NAH.SH awarded Stadler a €600m order for 55 battery-powered FLIRT Akku multiple unit trains along with maintenance for 30 years. The trains, which offer 150 km (93 mi) of battery range, were originally scheduled to enter operations in 2022 to replace DMUs on non-electrified routes. Regular operations began in October 2023.

In October 2025, an agreement was signed with VIAS Rail GmbH to supply 36 FLIRT XL MUs for the Rhine-Ruhr S-Bahn network. They are planned to enter service in December 2029

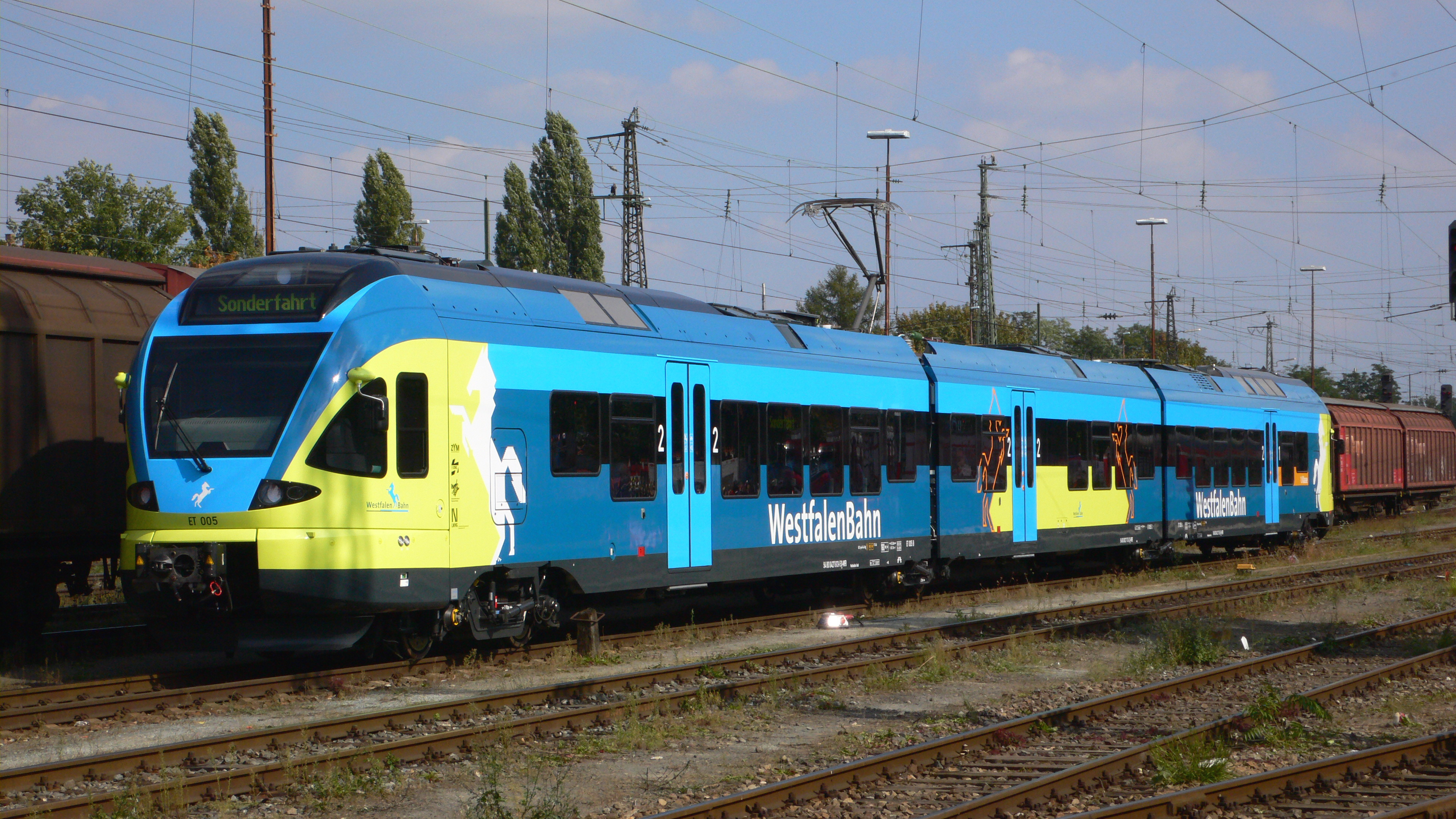
FLIRT of WestfalenBahn

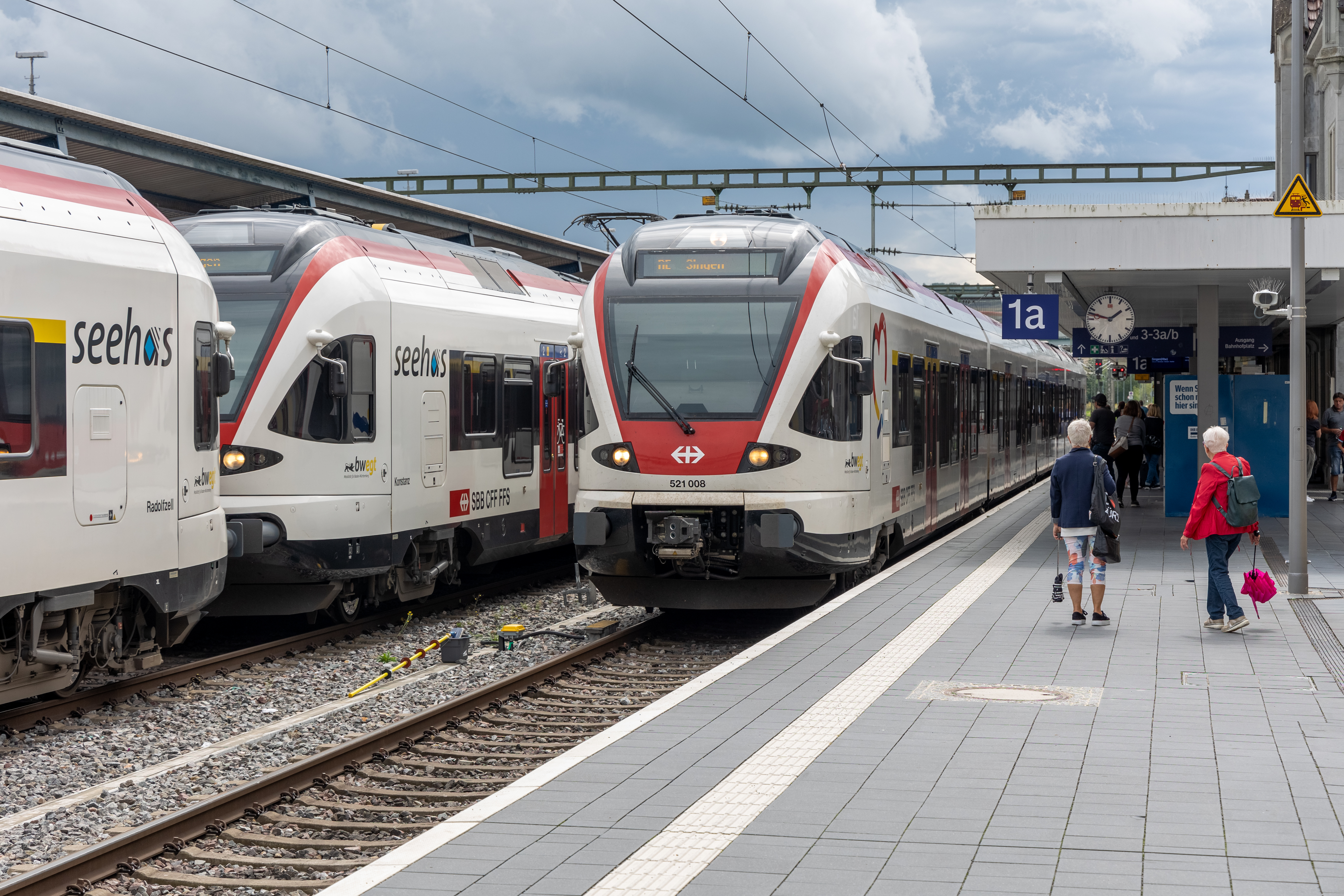
FLIRT of SBB GmbH at Konstanz station

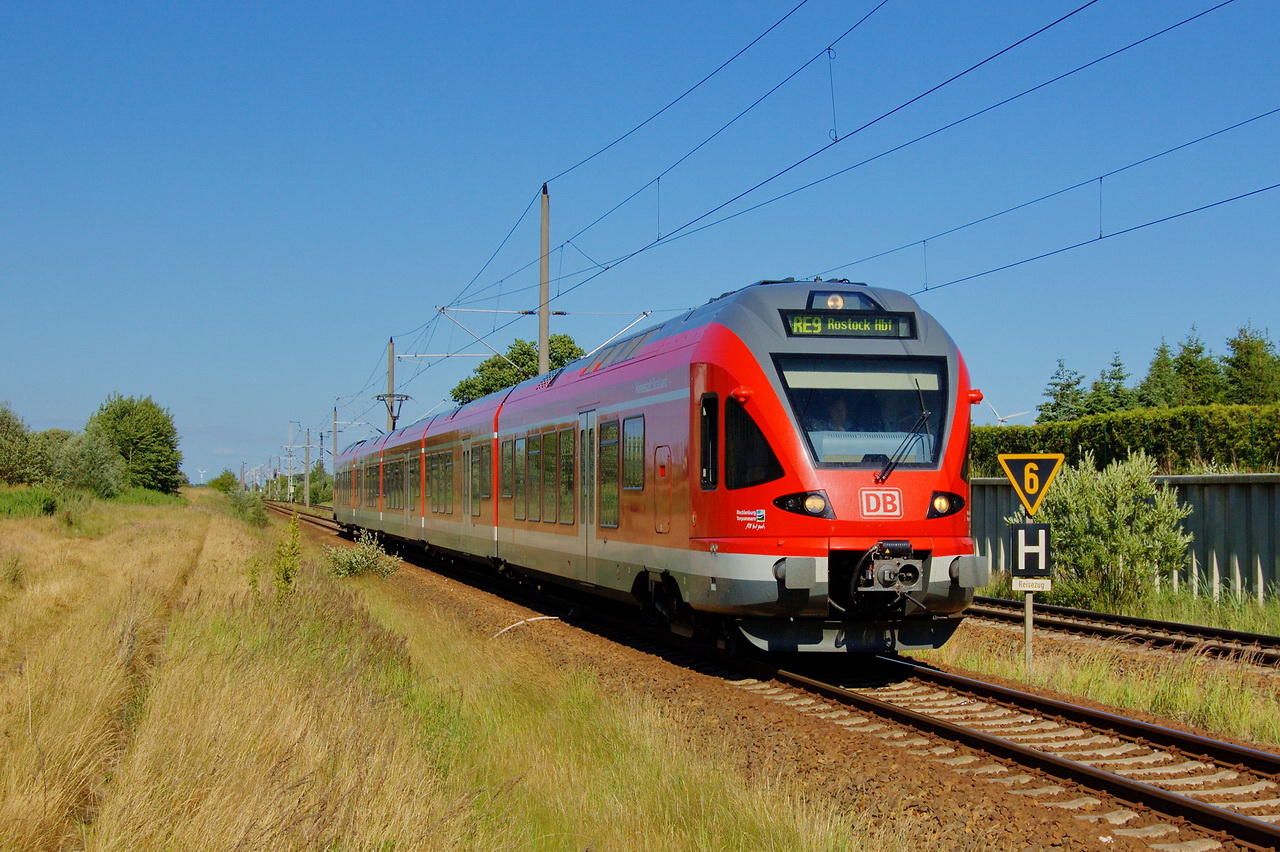
FLIRT of DB Regio

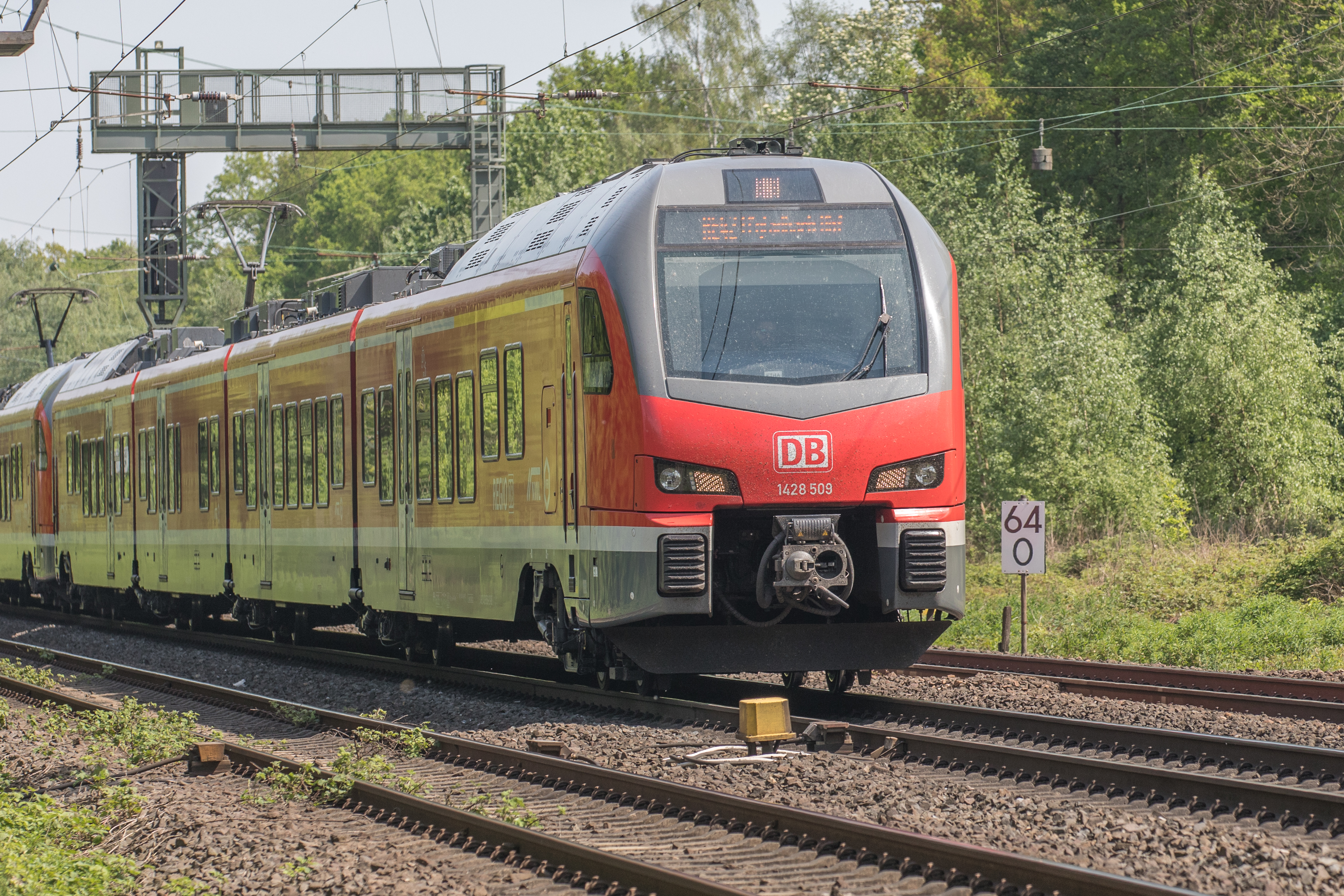
DB Regio FLIRT 3 on Wanne-Eickel–Hamburg railway

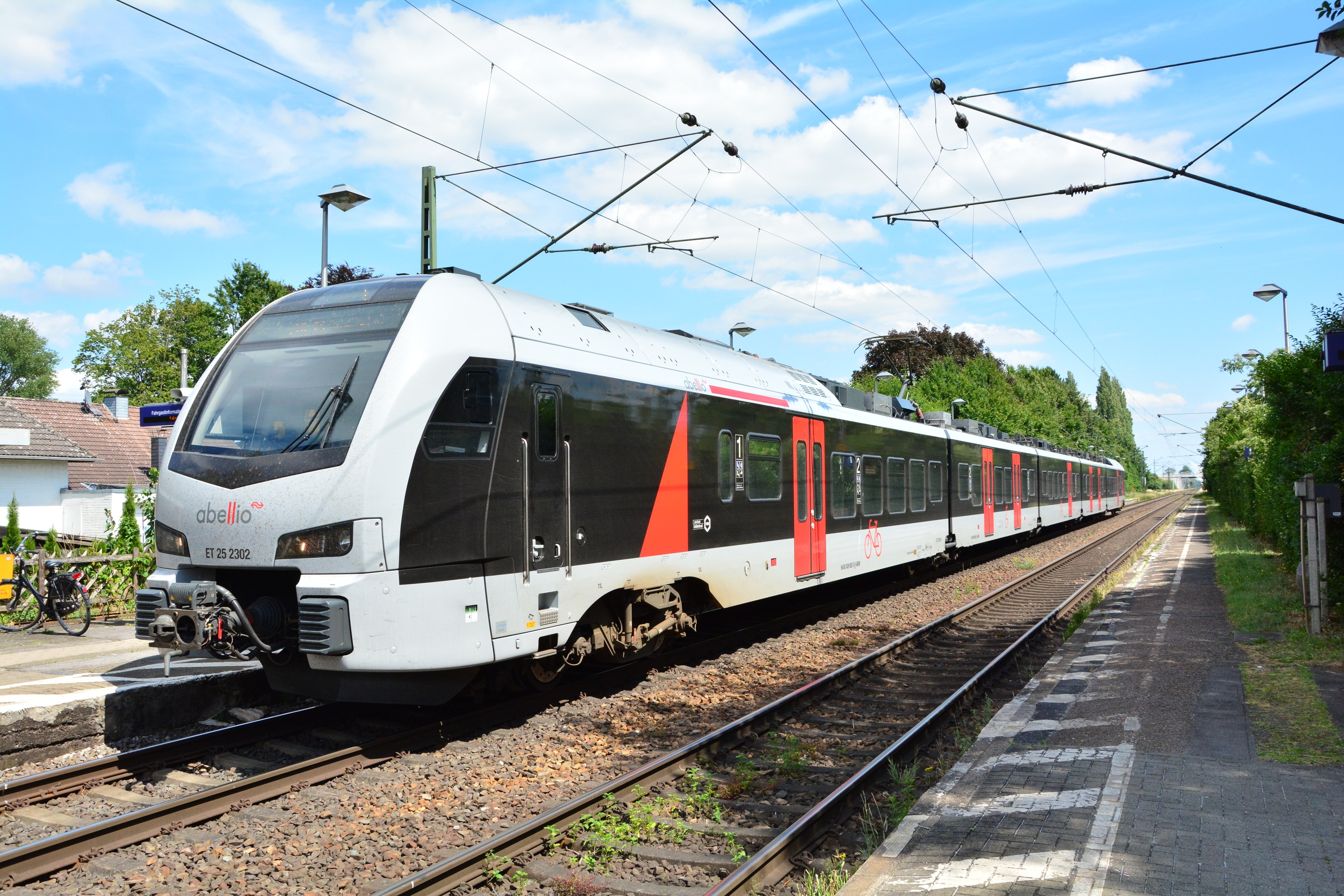
FLIRT 3 of Abellio NRW

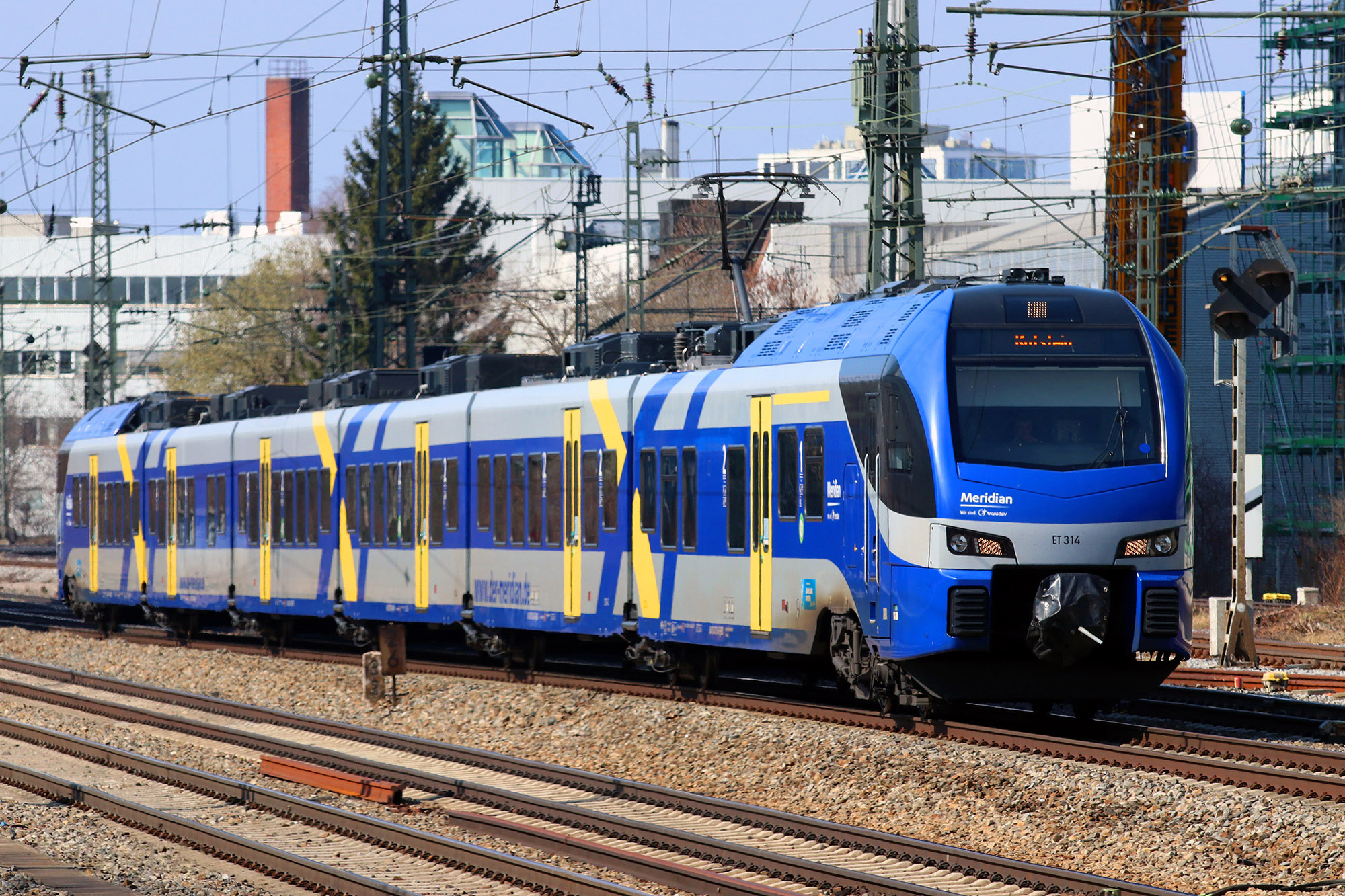
FLIRT 3 of Meridian

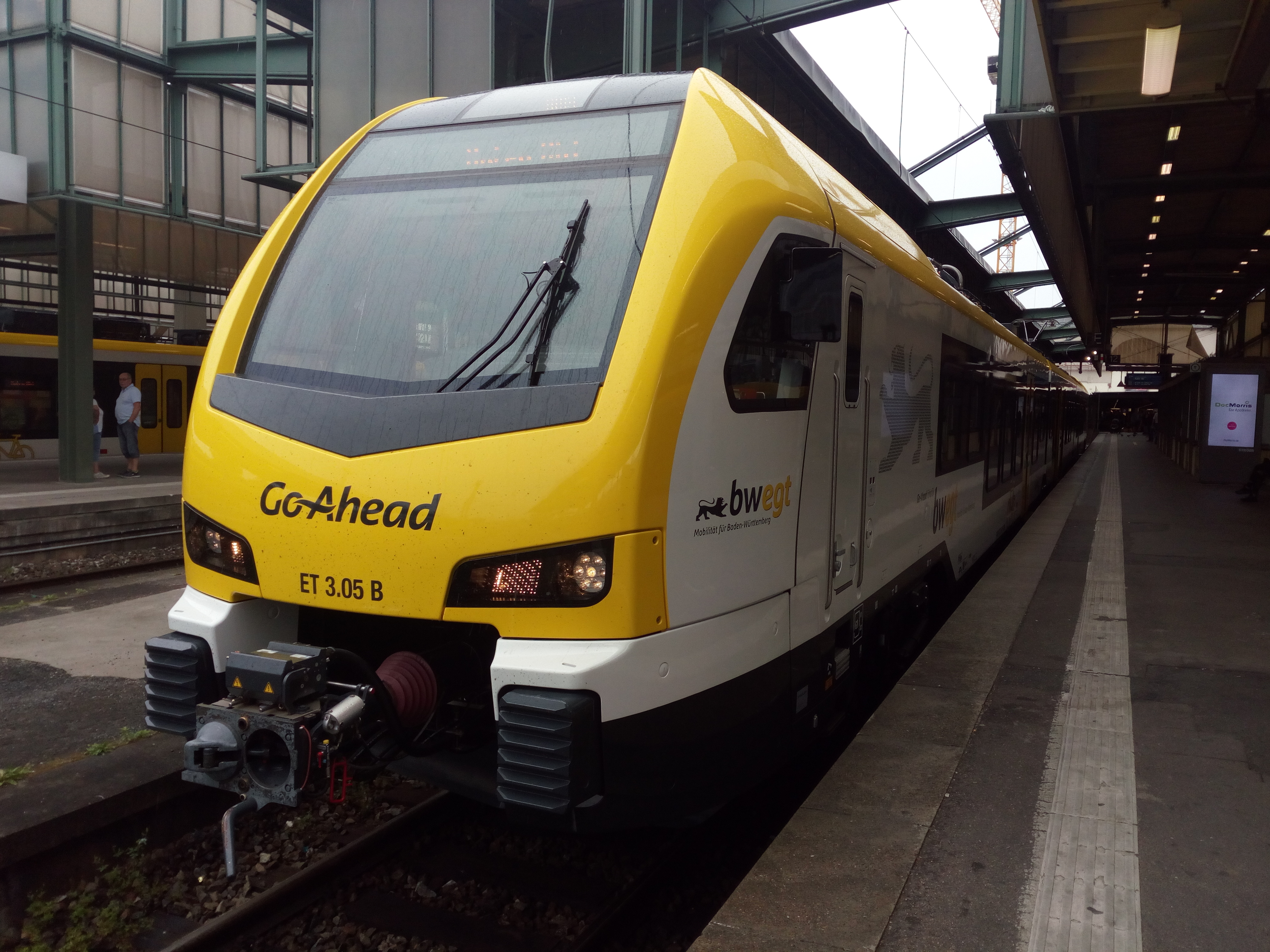
FLIRT 3 of Go-Ahead Germany

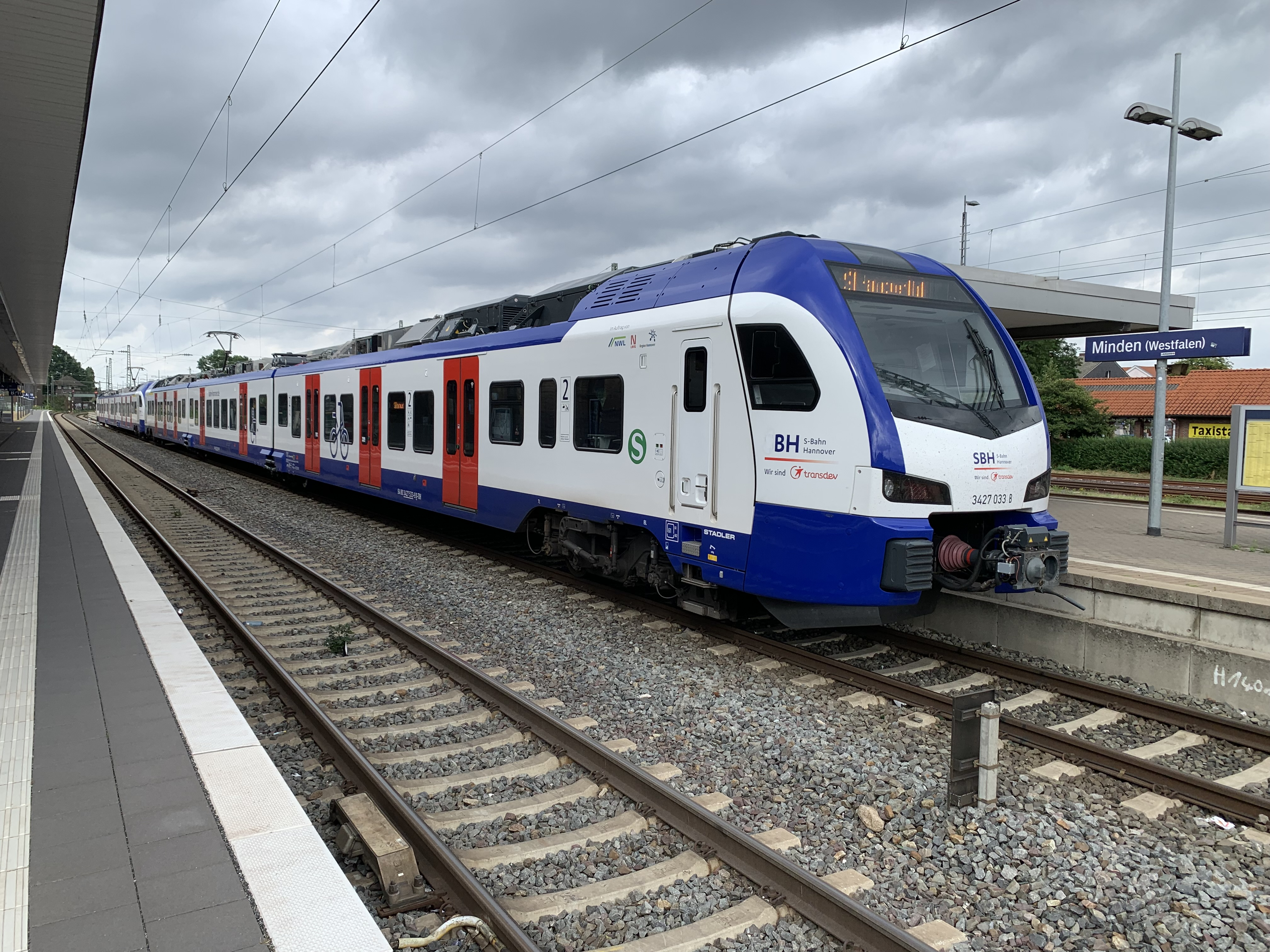
FLIRT 3 XL of Transdev

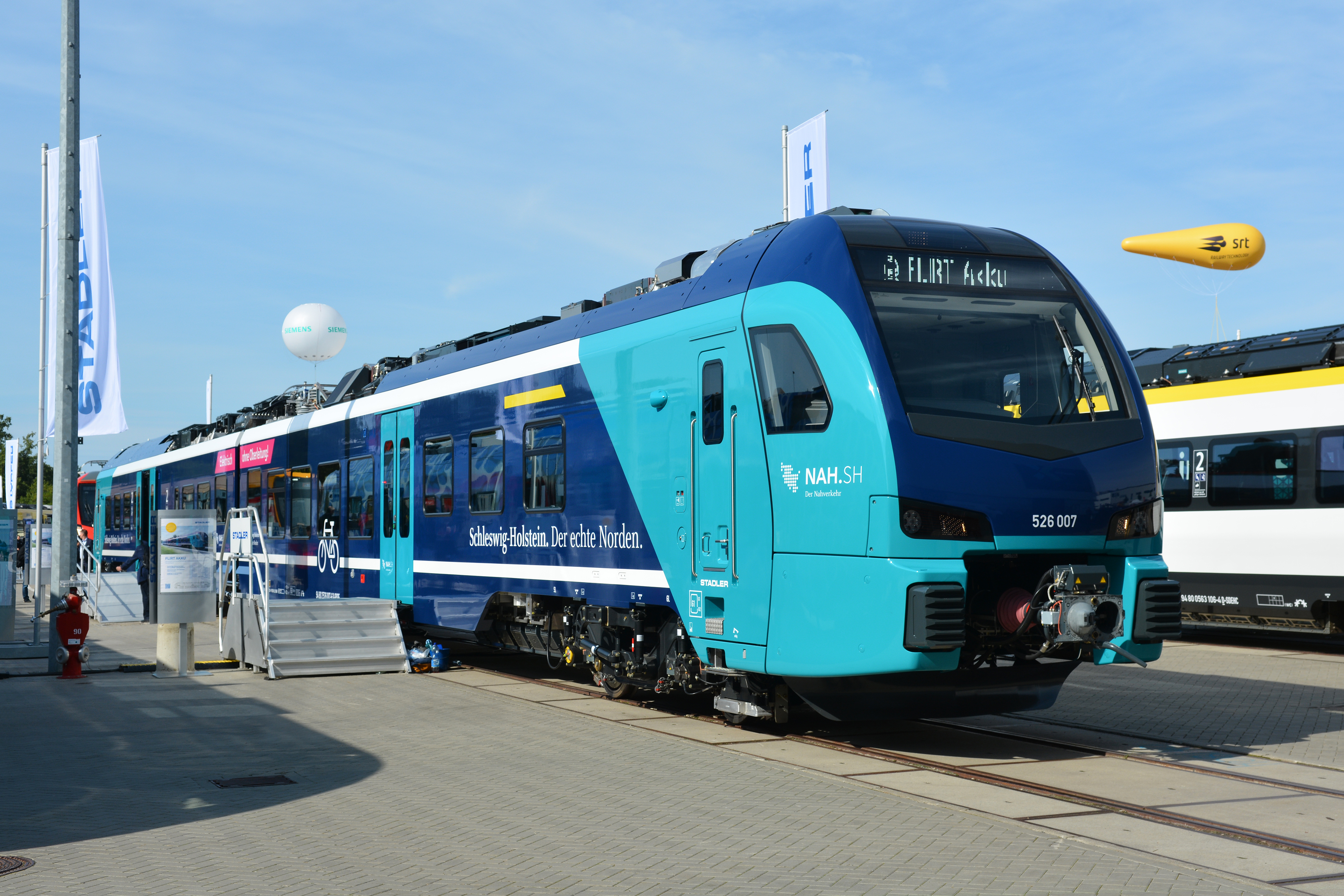
FLIRT Akku

=== Hungary ===
- Hungarian State Railways operates 123 units. Technical details: single voltage 25 kV, maximum speed 160 km/h, four-section trains with 200+11 (folding) seats, up to three trains can be connected together. The first 60 units got red, black, and white livery. During the first modernization the paint scheme was unified with other electric trains of MÁV. Now all 123 units have blue, black, and white livery with yellow doors.
- Győr–Sopron–Ebenfurth railway in 2012 ordered four units, delivery until Q2 2014. First two units arrived on 6 December 2014 and started their public service on 15 December of the same year.
- Hungarian State Railways in 2013 ordered further 42 units, delivery until Q3 2015. The first two units arrived on 27 February 2014 and the first one presented to the public at Kápolnásnyék on 19 March. New units have arrived in new livery of blue and white colour scheme with yellow doors instead of the previous red and white one.
- Győr–Sopron–Ebenfurth railway in 2013 ordered further six units, delivery until Q3 2015
- Hungarian State Railways in July 2015 ordered further 21 units, delivery until Q4 2016. The first unit arrived on 11 September 2015 These four-section units have the same blue and white colour scheme with yellow doors which is the same as the 2013 orders livery.
- Győr–Sopron–Ebenfurth railway in September 2016 ordered further ten units the first order of the new FLIRT 3 version, delivery until Q1 2019
- Győr–Sopron–Ebenfurth railway in 2024 ordered eleven five-car FLIRT EMUs for intercity services on the Budapest-Győr-Sopron and Szombathely lines with plans for these trains to also operate in Austria. The trains will be dual-voltage and capable of running at a maximum speed of 160 km/h. They will feature both first and second class, air conditioning, low-floor passenger areas, food and beverage vending machines, USB-C chargers, Wi-Fi, holders for tablets and smartphones, and bicycle storage. The first unit finished construction in July 2026 and the testing of the trains began in August of the same year, with testing taking place in Făurei in Romania, in Velim in Czechia, and in Hungary from the end of 2026. The first train is expected to enter service in 2027, with the full fleet in service by summer 2028.

MÁV operates 123 units, while GYSEV operates twenty units from this series (2019).

It is planned that the first sixty units will be equipped with ETCS L2 signaling, control and train protection system, while all newer units are already equipped with ETCS L2. The units will also receive the blue and white colour scheme.

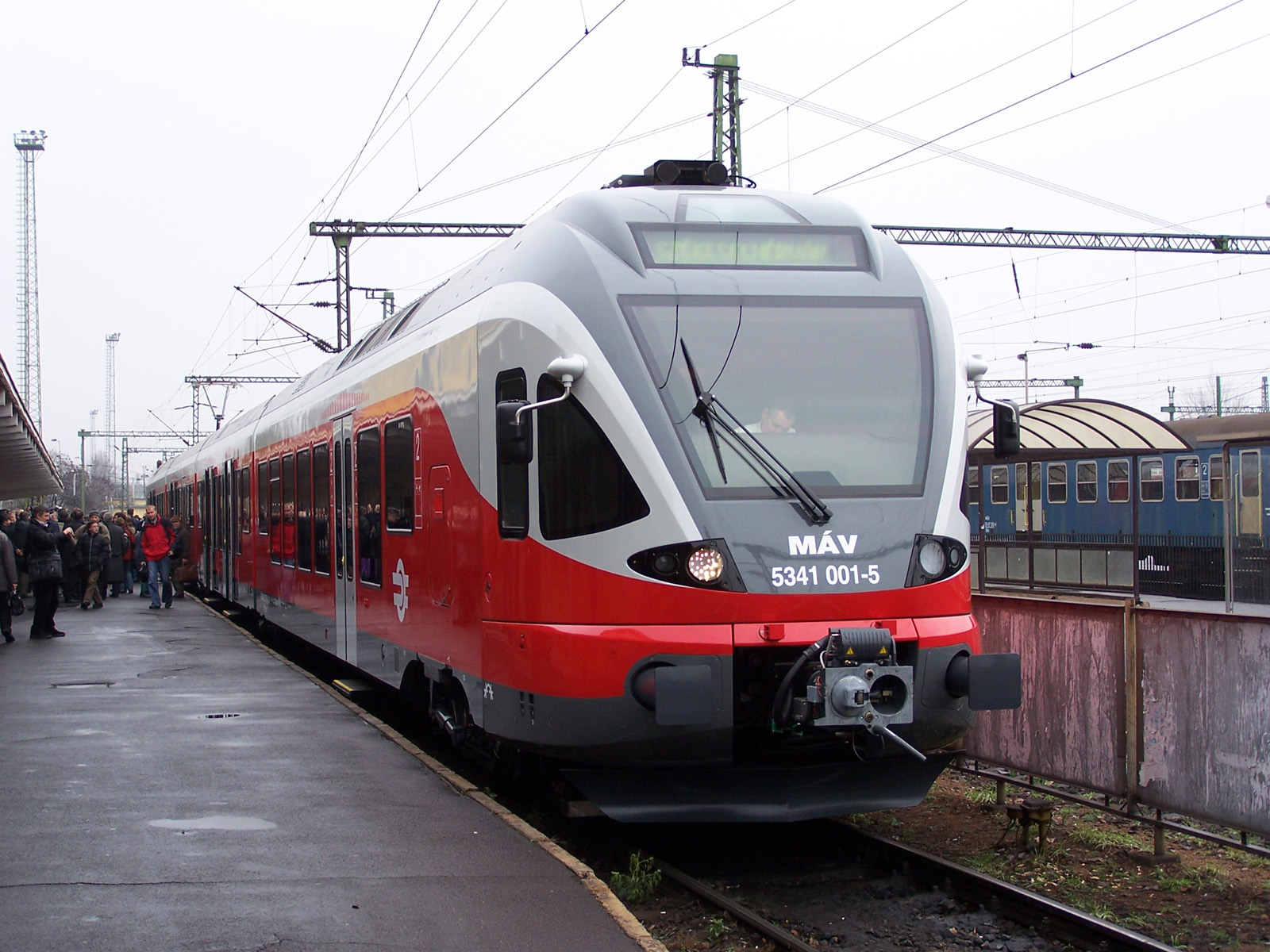
MÁV-Start series 415 FLIRT (old red livery)

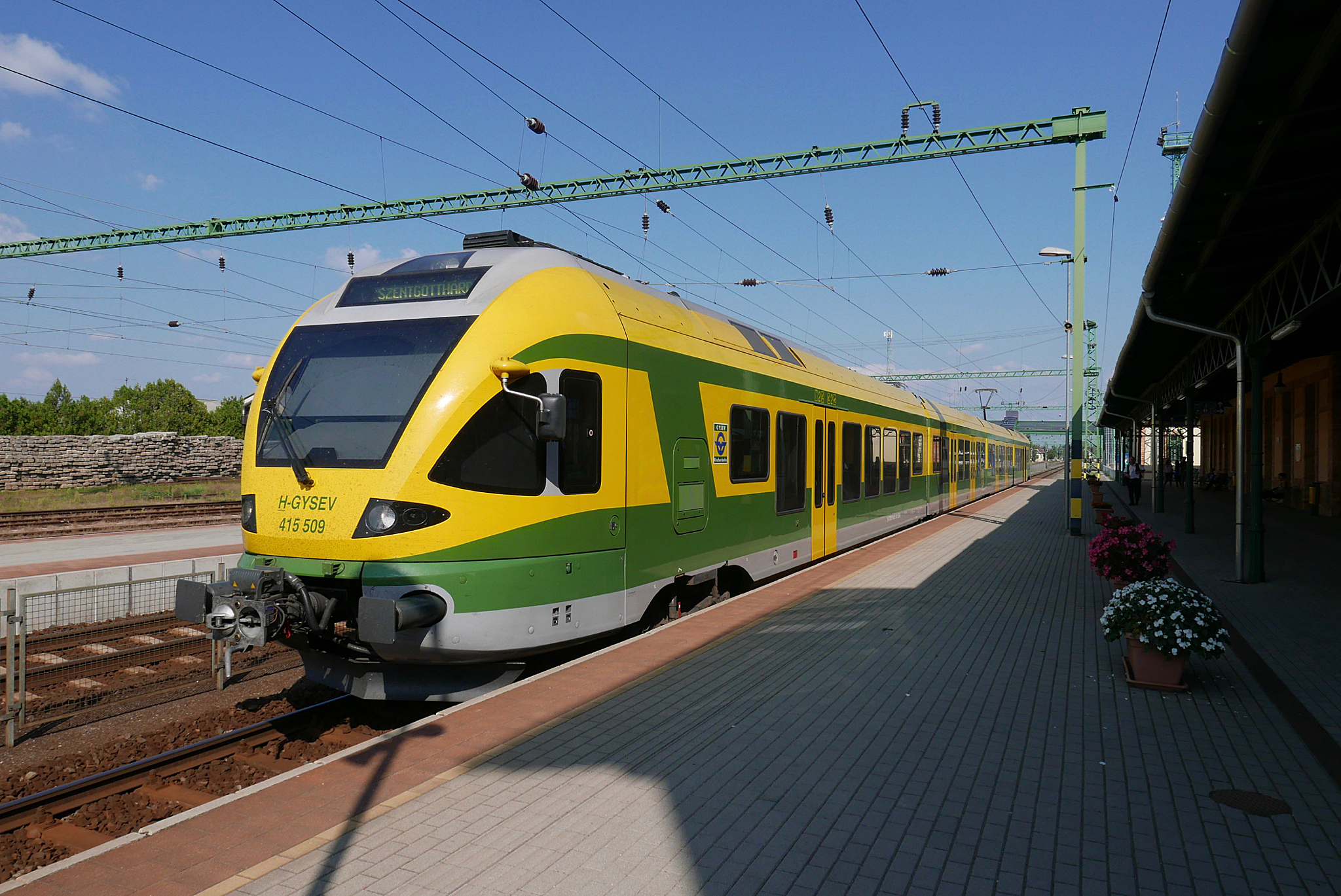
GySEV series 415 FLIRT

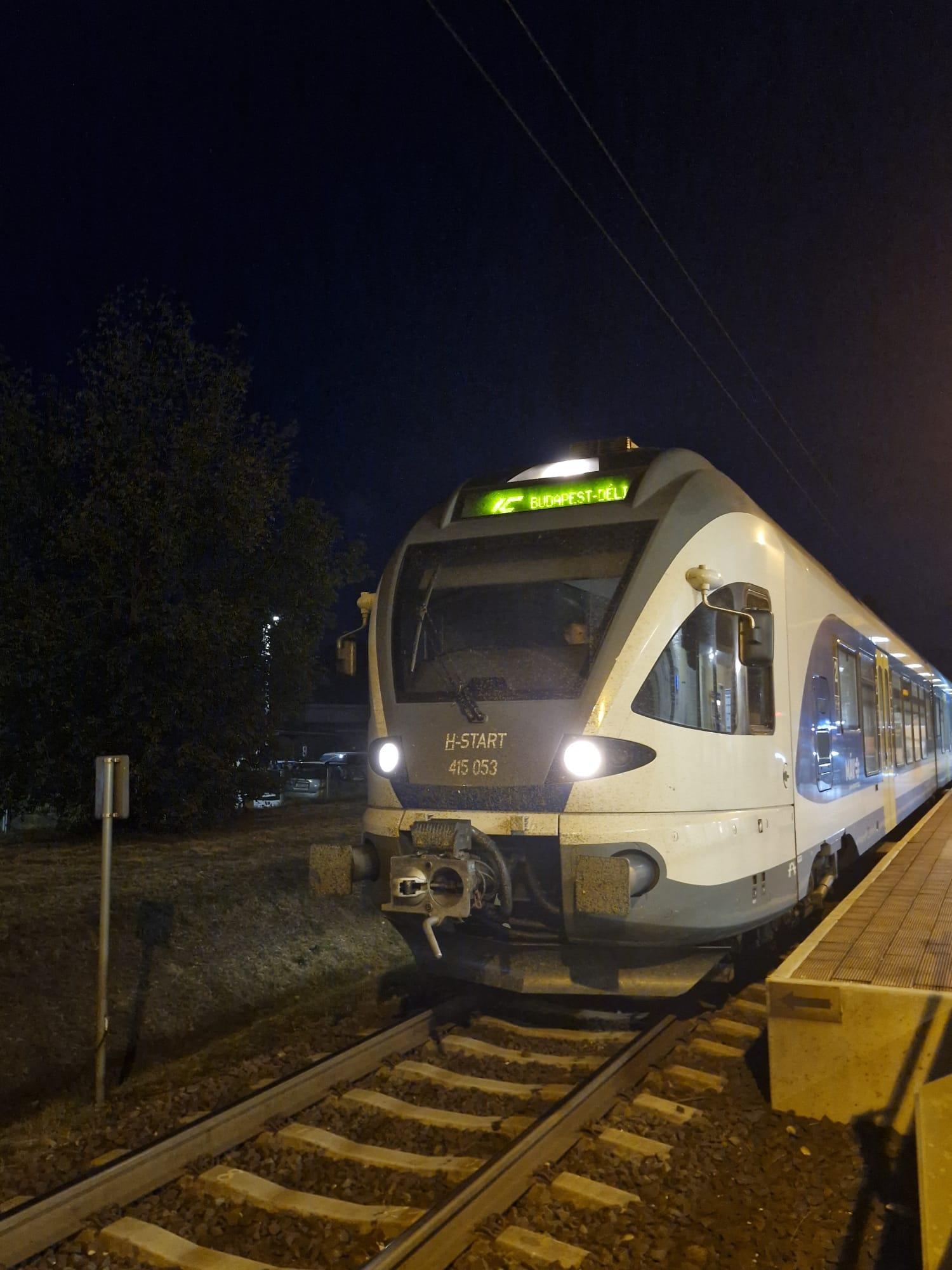
MÁV-Start series 415 FLIRT (new blue livery)

=== Ireland ===
On 8 December 2025, Iarnród Éireann and NI Railways selected Stadler FLIRT multiple units for use on the Enterprise service between Dublin and Belfast. The units will be tri-mode, capable of running on Dublin’s 1.5 kV DC overhead wires, internal batteries, and a diesel generator, with provisions to replace the diesel power plant with dual-voltage equipment.

=== Italy ===
In Italy FLIRT units are used by nine regional railways, with total units ordered and built divided among the following companies:

Ferrovie del Gargano: ETR 330, single voltage to 3 kV DC, maximum speed 160 km/h (99 mph). Fleet: three units.

Ferrotramviaria: ETR 340, single-voltage 3 kV DC, maximum speed 160 km/h (99 mph). Fleet: four units.

SAD used on the Puster Valley Railway, ETR 155 and ETR 170. Dual-voltage 15 kV AC and 3 kV DC. Fleet: four ETR 155 and six ETR 170. In July 2011 have been ordered eight new units for routes within the jurisdiction of SAD. As of 2020 there are eight FLIRT dual-voltage units, 001–008 (005–008 ex ETR 155), and 24 ETR 170.1 and 170.2 dual- and tri-voltage units (3 kV DC, 15 kV AC, 25 kV 50 Hz)

Infrastrutture Venete (formerly Sistemi territoriali): ETR 340, single-voltage 3 kV DC, maximum speed 160 km/h (99 mph). Fleet: two units from 2008, four and sixteen FLIRT units ordered in 2009. The FLIRTs ordered in 2009 will be built in conjunction with AnsaldoBreda: Stadler Rail will produce end units, traction systems and onboard auxiliary, and bogies, while AnsaldoBreda will produce intermediate cars, final assembly, and delivery to the operators at the plant in Pistoia.

Tilo (Switzerland and Italy): RABe 524/ETR 150, dual-voltage 15 kV AC, 3 kV DC. Maximum speed 160 km/h (99 mph). The first 19 units of this type to be delivered were four sections long, followed by eleven units which are six sections long and equipped with ETCS Level 2.

Ferrovie Emilia Romagna: Twelve units constructed with AnsaldoBreda: Stadler Rail will produce end units, traction systems and onboard auxiliary, end engines, while AnsaldoBreda will produce intermediate cars and handle final assembly and delivery to the operators at the plant in Pistoia.

Valle d'Aosta region (licensed to Trenitalia):

- BTR 813, electro-diesel multiple units with maximum speed of 160 km/h (99 mph) in electric mode and 140 km/h (87 mph) in diesel mode.
- ETR 814, electric multiple units with maximum speed of 160 km/h (99 mph), will be entry in service after the electrification of railway Aosta - Ivrea in 2026.
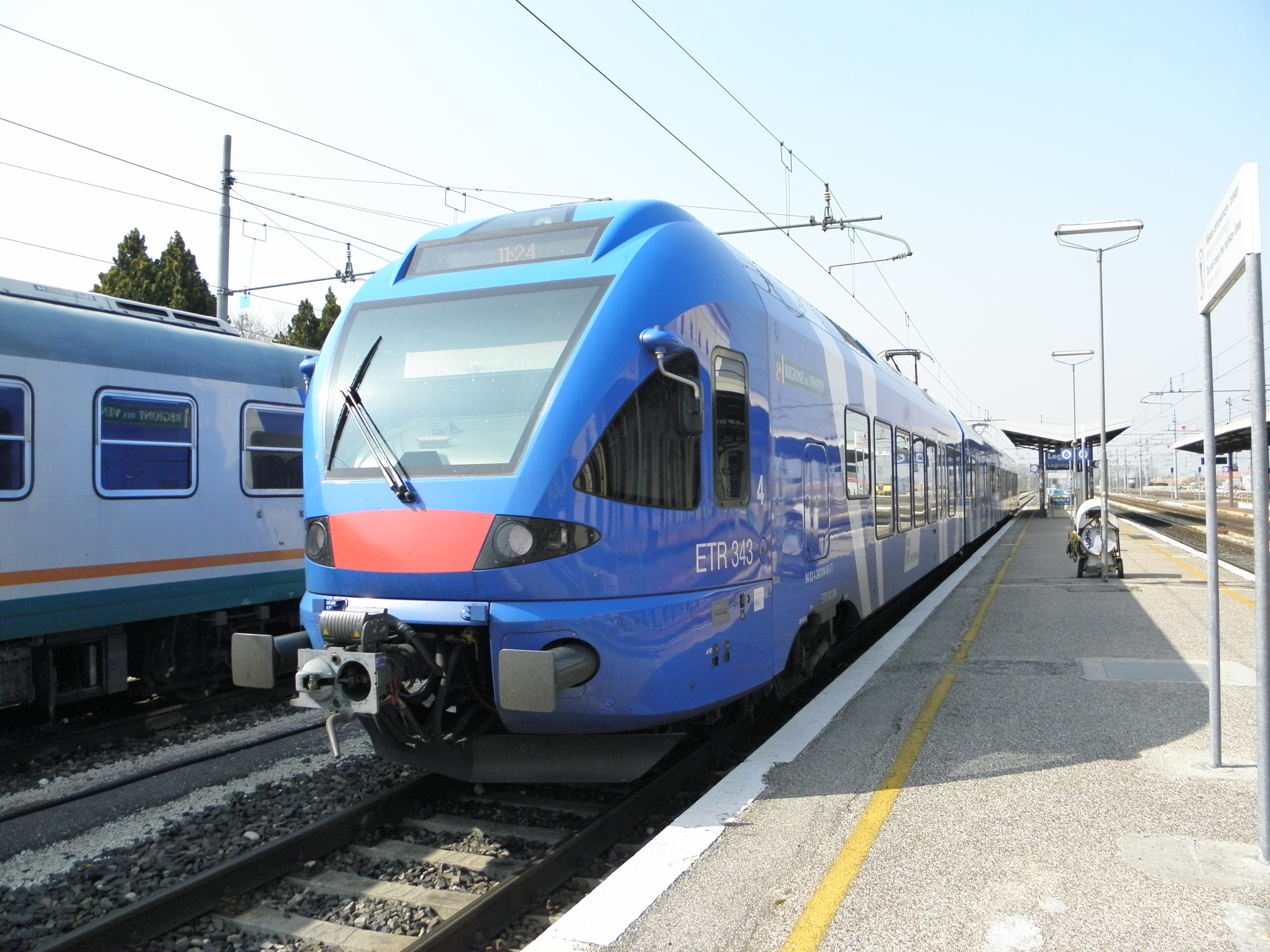
ST ETR 340 unit

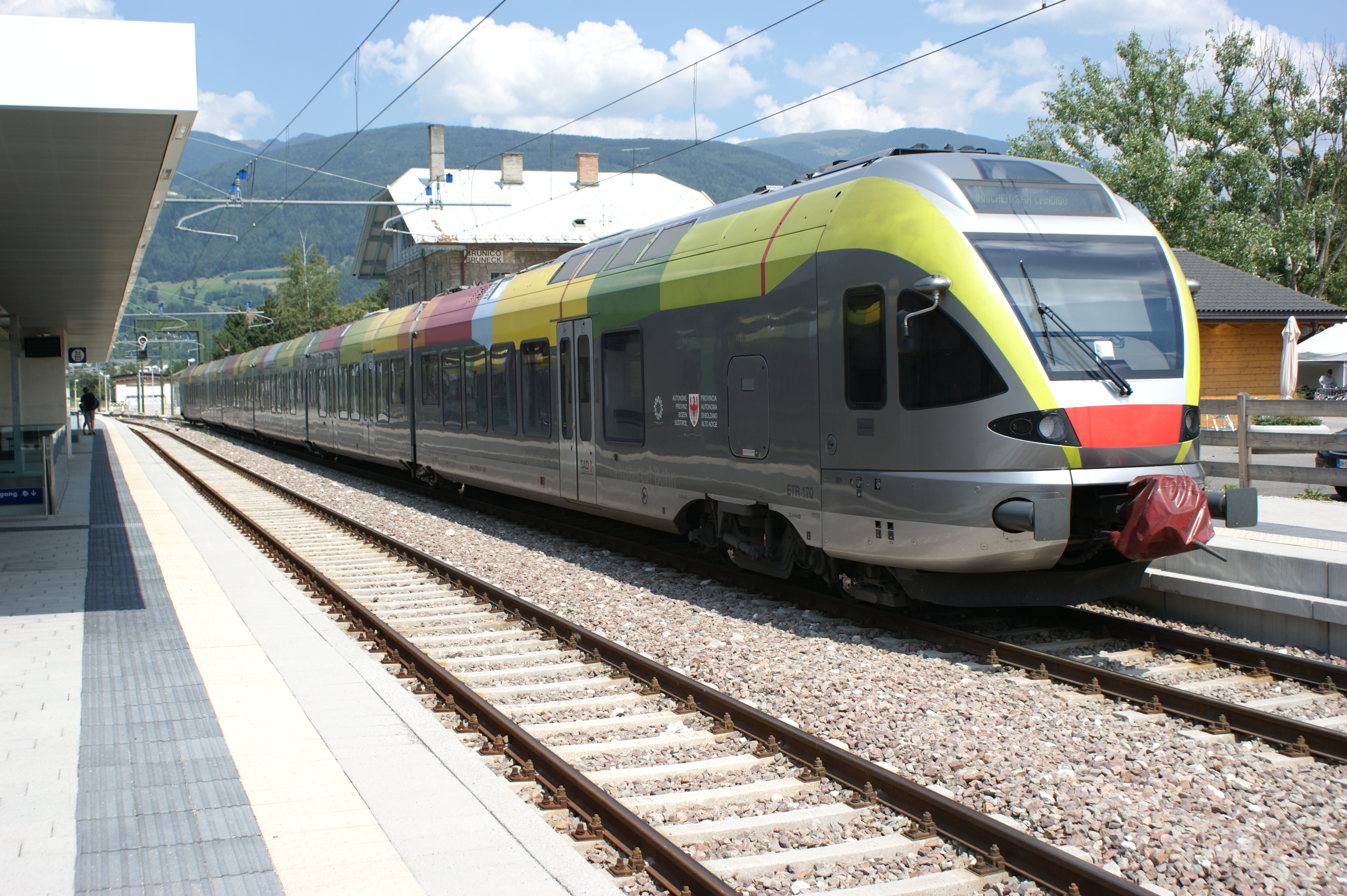
SAD ETR 170 unit at Bruneck railway station

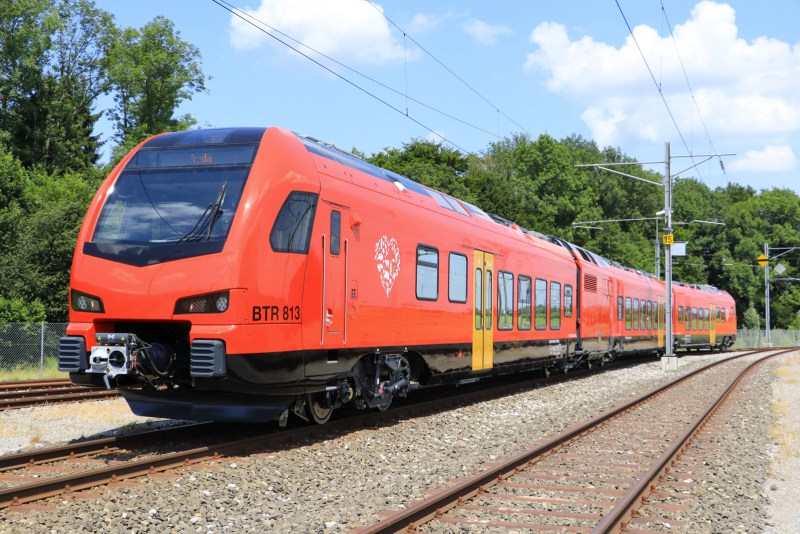
BTR 813 unit

Trenord: ATR 803, named "Colleoni". Thirty diesel multiple unit with diesel generator and traction batteries with the maximum speed of 140 km/h (87 mph). The first four trains entered service from 2022 in the Brescia - Parma to replace the oldest Aln 668. These trains were temporarily retired due to initial problems of the systems of supports of conducts (SSC) caused from this last one. The trains returned in service in 2023.

Ente Autonomo Volturno (EAV) (Campania Region) has five trains in service from 2022 in the Alifana Railway.

=== Lithuania ===
On 21 June 2023, Lithuanian passenger rail operator LTG Link announced that it has ordered nine 5-car Stadler FLIRT EMUs and six 3-car FLIRT battery-electric multiple units, along with an option for a further 13 electric and 26 battery-electric units. The trains entered service in late 2026.

=== Netherlands ===
On 23 April 2015 the Netherlands' railway operator Nederlandse Spoorwegen announced that it was ordering 58 Stadler FLIRT EMUs, comprising 25 four-car units and 33 three-car units, to be delivered by the end of 2016. The very short delivery deadline (20 months), to meet capacity needs, allowed NS to invoke 'urgency mode' provisions in EU procurement rules and place the order without tendering. The 58 FLIRT EMUs for NS were produced at Stadler's plant in Siedlce, Poland, 92 km east of Warsaw, following the order which that plant completed for PKP Intercity in Poland. Meanwhile, Arriva Nederland also ordered two- and three-car units for operation in the province of Limburg.

As of 2023, FLIRT 2, 3 and 4 EMUs are in service in the Netherlands with the following operators:

- Arriva
- Nederlandse Spoorwegen (some of them with R-net branding)
- Keolis (Blauwnet, RRReis and former Connexxion Valleilijn branding)
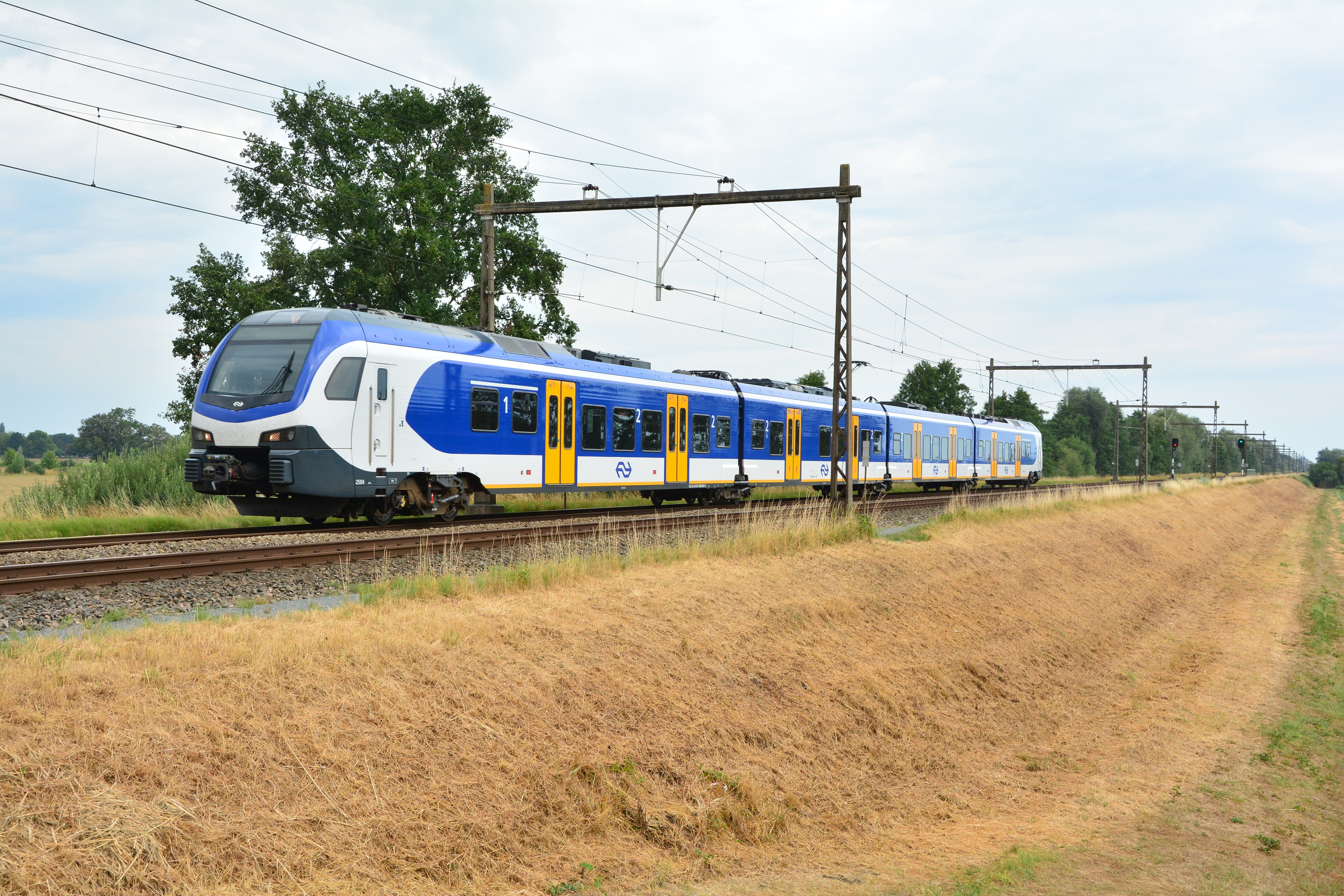
Nederlandse Spoorwegen FLIRT

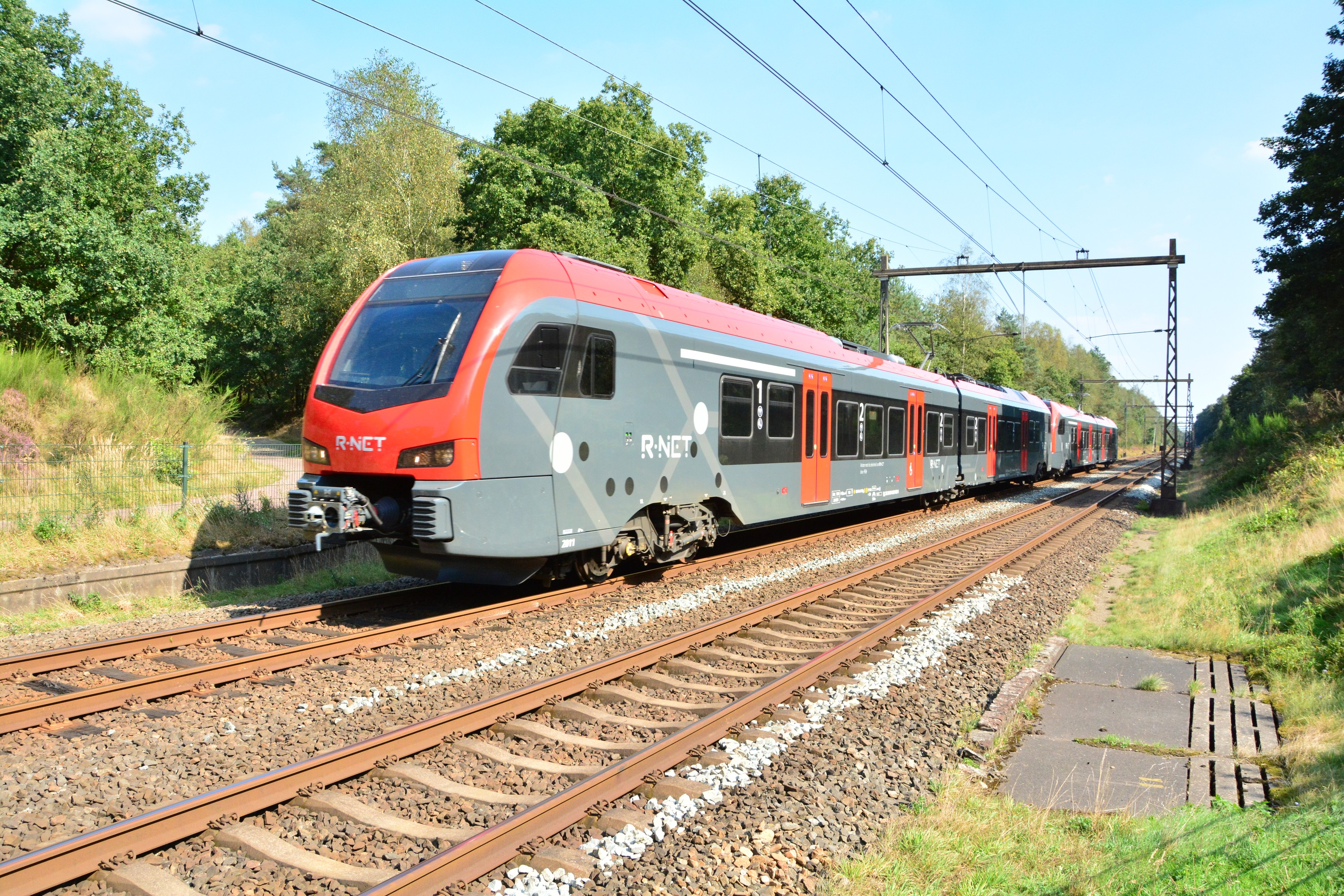
NS R-Net FLIRT

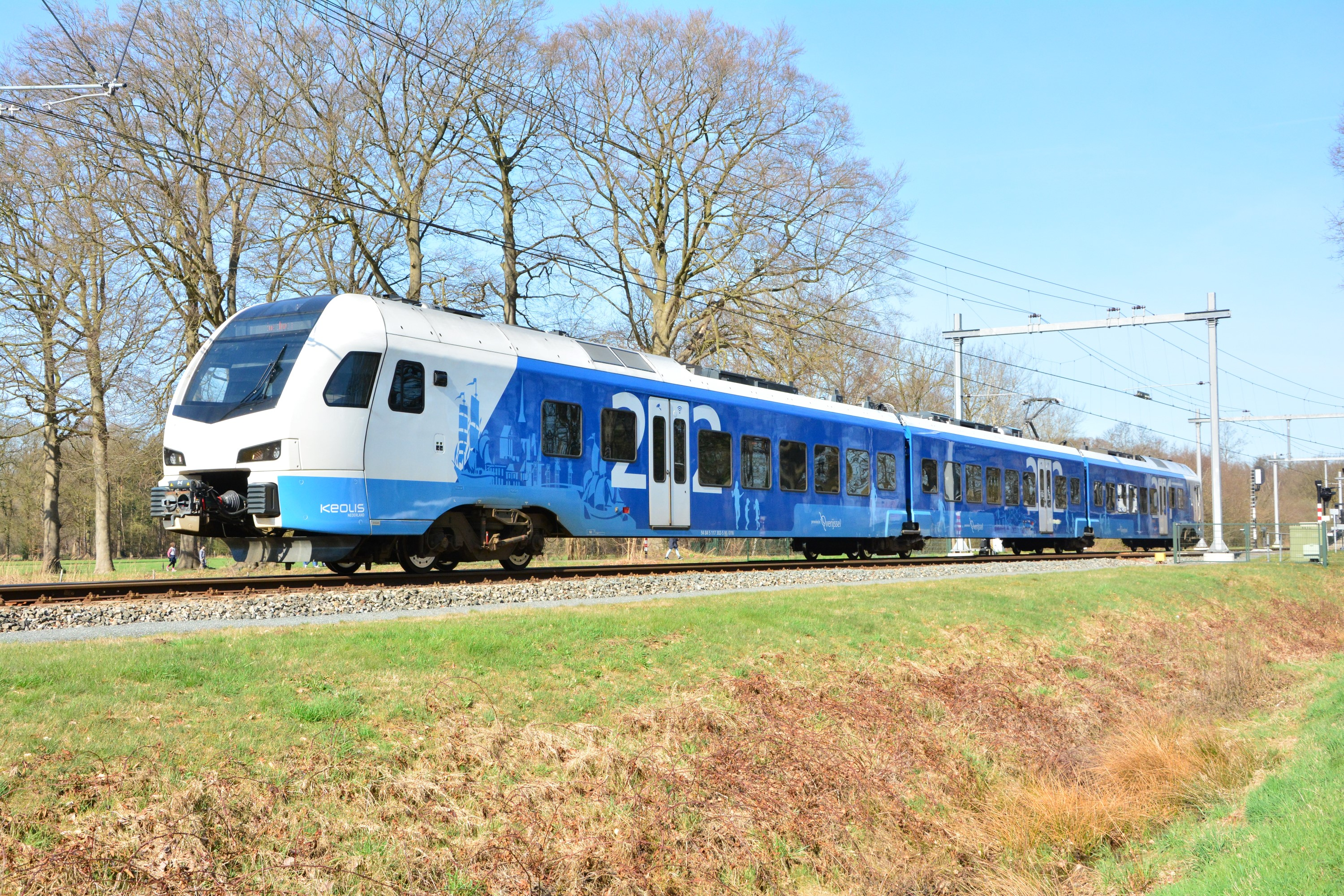
Keolis FLIRT

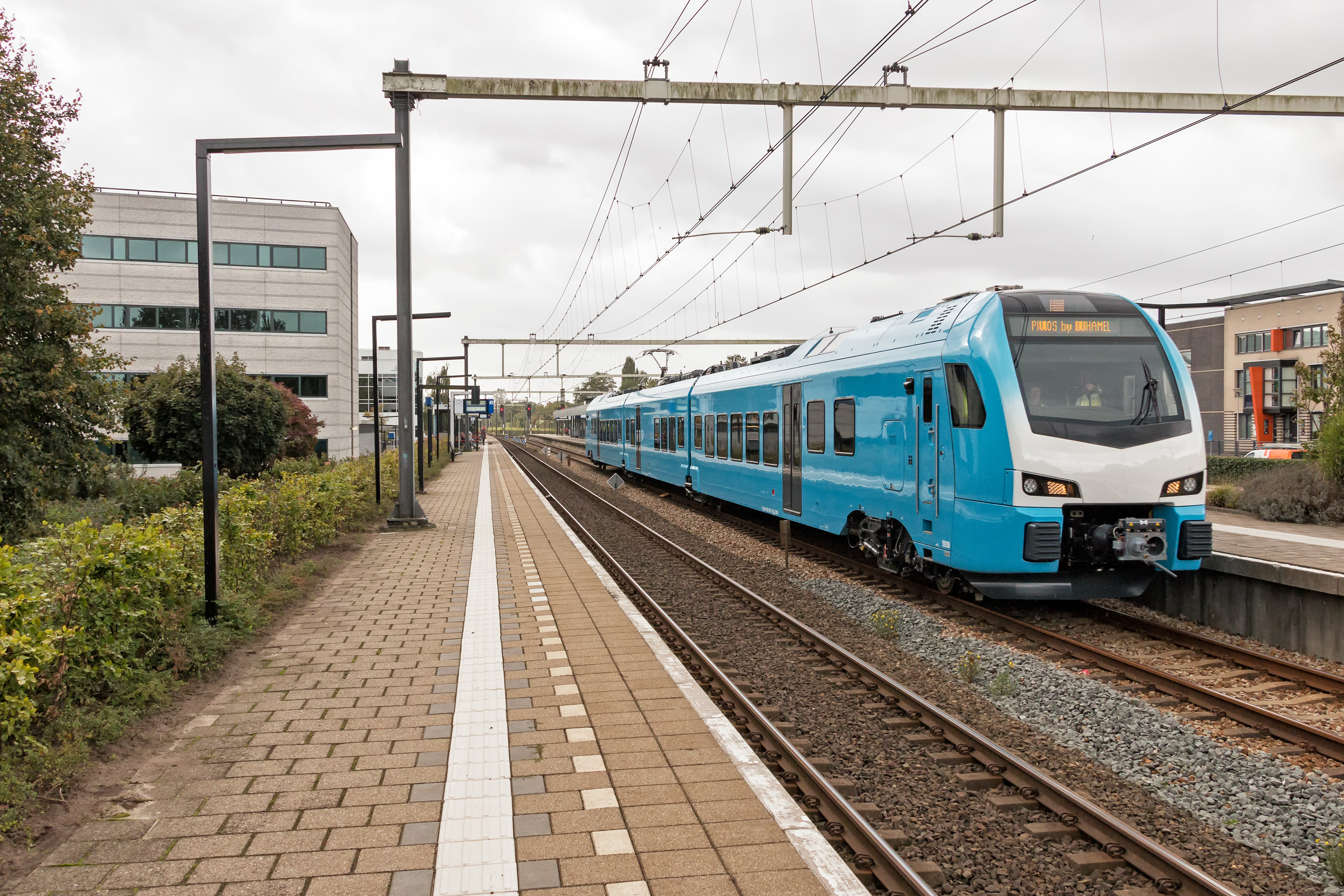
Ex-Connexxion FLIRT, now Keolis RRReis

In November 2025, NS signed a contract for 36 FLIRT EMUs.

=== Norway ===
50 Flirt units were ordered by Vy (formerly Norwegian State Railways (NSB)), with a further 100 on option. 26 units were placed on Oslo Commuter Rail and the remaining 24 units were used on regional and express routes. During spring and summer 2012 all Flirt trains used by Vy were fitted with free wireless Internet access for passengers. In Vy's system, the FLIRT trains are classified as Class 74 for regional trainsets and Class 75 for local trainsets.

All trains will be five-car sets; unlike previous five-car FLIRTs each will have a third powered bogie giving it a maximum power output of 4,500 kW (6,000 hp) and a top speed of 200 km/h (124 mph). Trial runs started on the Bergen Line in 2009, using an SBB-CFF-FFS unit. The first units were scheduled to enter passenger service on 29 February 2012. The FLIRT's introduction was delayed after a unit derailed during tests by NSB on 15 February 2012, injuring five people. The train was running much too fast, and there were no safety systems along the railway to catch the driver's error.

The first train entered regular service on 2 May 2012 on the line from Skien to Lillehammer. The last of the 50 trains was delivered on 24 January 2014. Vy had ordered a further 57 trains, for a total of 107, as of October 2015. In 2017 an order for additional 18 was placed, for a total of 125, forty of which are short regional trains, and the rest local commuter trains. In July 2018, 36 short regional and 64 local commuter trains had been delivered.

Local Class 75 trains are configured with five seats (2+3) abreast. The Class 74 regional trains were also delivered with 2+3 seating on regional trains except in the premium "Komfort" section that had 2+2 seating. Significant passenger complaints over cramped seating led Nsb to reconfigure the regional trains into 2+2 seating in 2014.

These fleets have 800 mm (31 1/2 in) floor without steps. Many Norwegian platforms are too low for this floor height, so they will have to be raised to 550 mm (21 5/8 in) platform height. (Note: Also in Poland, low platforms have been raised during Polish FLIRT delivery.) These fleets cannot operate on low-platform lines such as the Bergen Line, the Sørlandet Line west of Kongsberg, and the Dovre Line north of Lillehammer. Raised platforms will be matched with conventional train steps; vertical gaps between this fleet and platforms will remain.

In 2018 the last options were used, which includes 25 trainsets, most of which include the Class 75 and 74 that are set to operate on Gjøvikbanen and Vossebanen.

The two last are bi-mode trains named Class 76. These are similar to the FLIRT 3s owned by Greater Anglia in the UK but each will have an extra carriage for diesel generators in order to operate on tracks without electrification and as fully electric on electrified parts of the railway.

In total 14 trainsets of the bi-modal Class 76 will be delivered to serve Trønder Commuter Rail as well as the Meråker and Røros Lines. These will replace the aging Class 92's built by Duewag which are fully diesel. All this is included in Bane Nor (Norway's Rail Management Agency) and Jernbaneverkets's plan to finally modernize the Trøndelag Railways, which have outdated buildings and infrastructure. These lines were partially electrified, between Støren and Trondheim, by 2021, with further electrification to be implemented.

In November 2022 the final 150th train set was delivered.

In February 2023 Norske tog ordered 17 FLIRT NEX long-distance trains, with the option of up to 100 train sets, to enter testing in 2025 and service on the Bergen Line in 2026, replacing end-of-life trainsets on the line. These will be classified as 'Class 79' and have 8 wagons including reclining seats, flexible sleeping compartments that can be used as private seating areas during daytime use, bistro, and a family area.

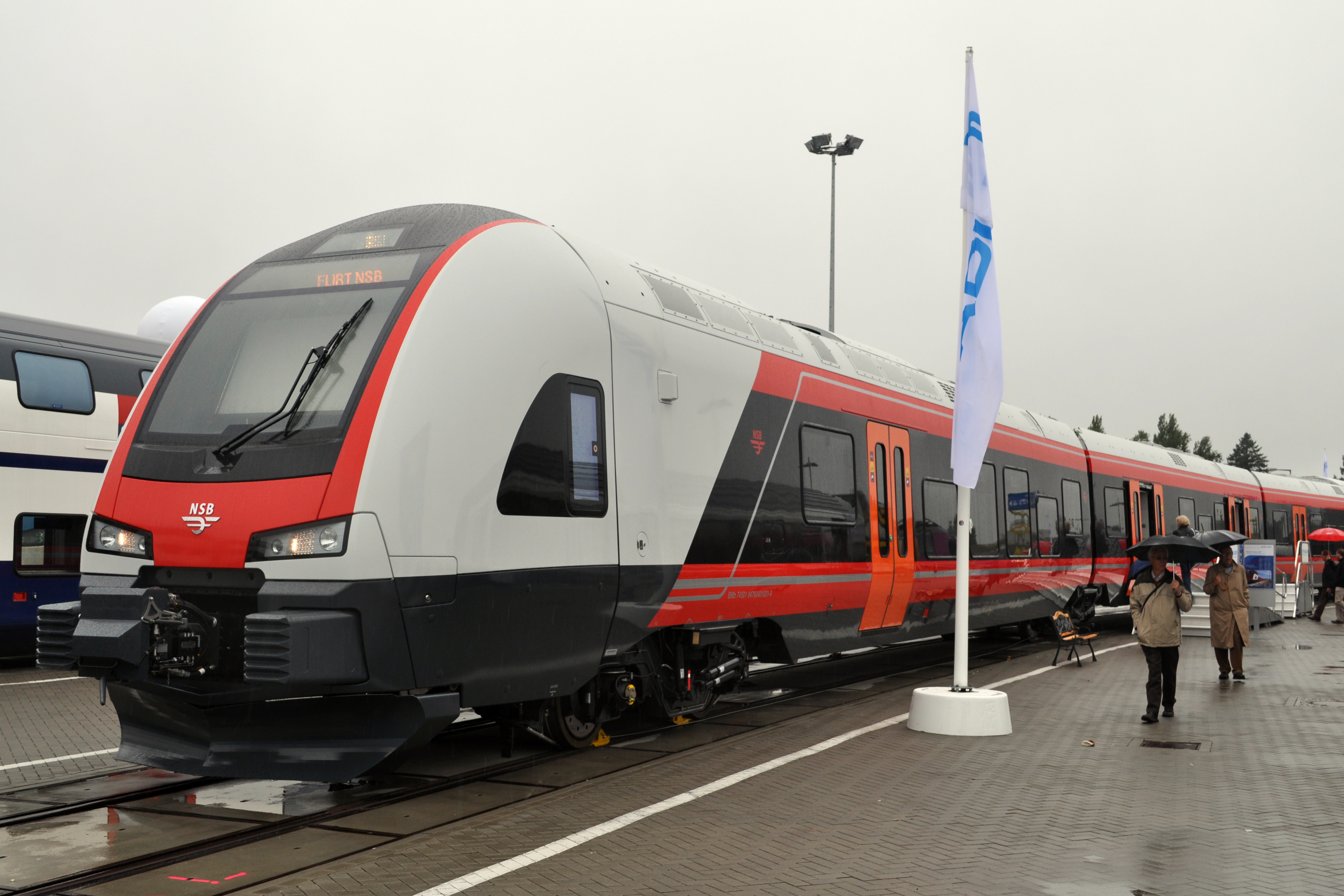
The Stadler Flirt for NSB (now Vy) at InnoTrans 2010

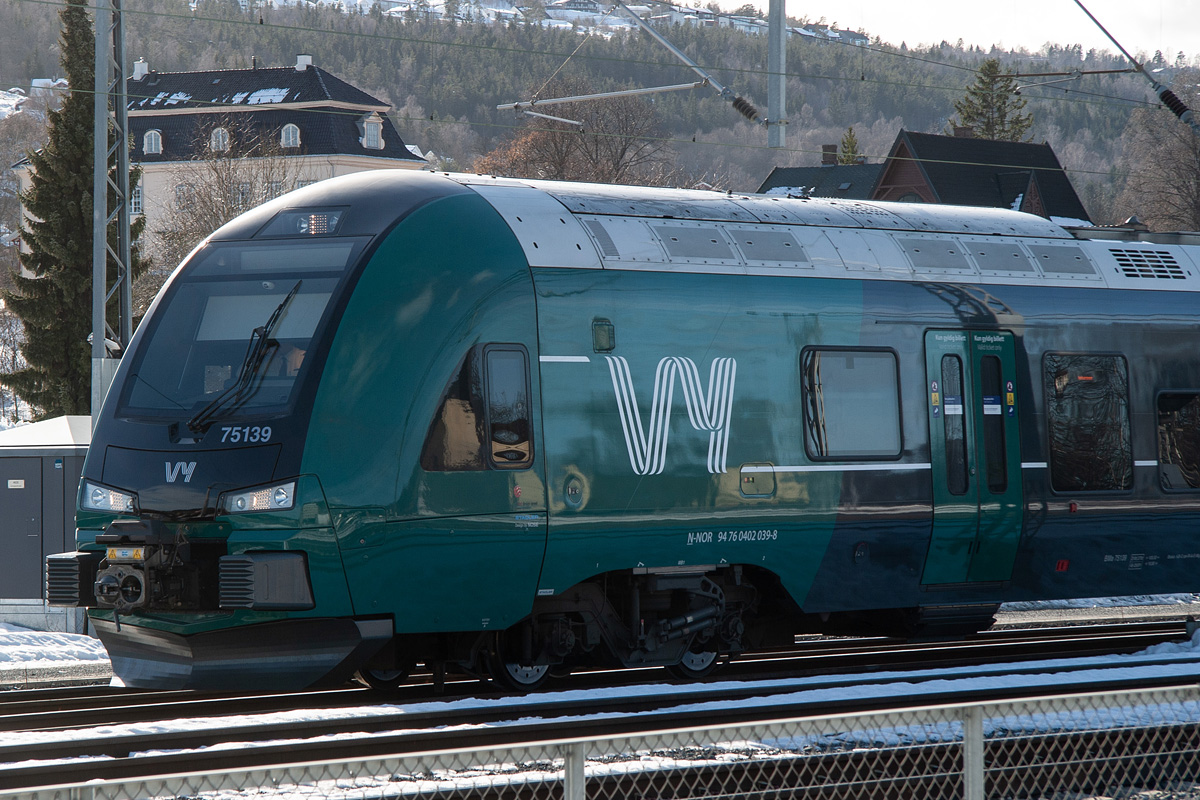
Stadler Flirt with new Vy livery

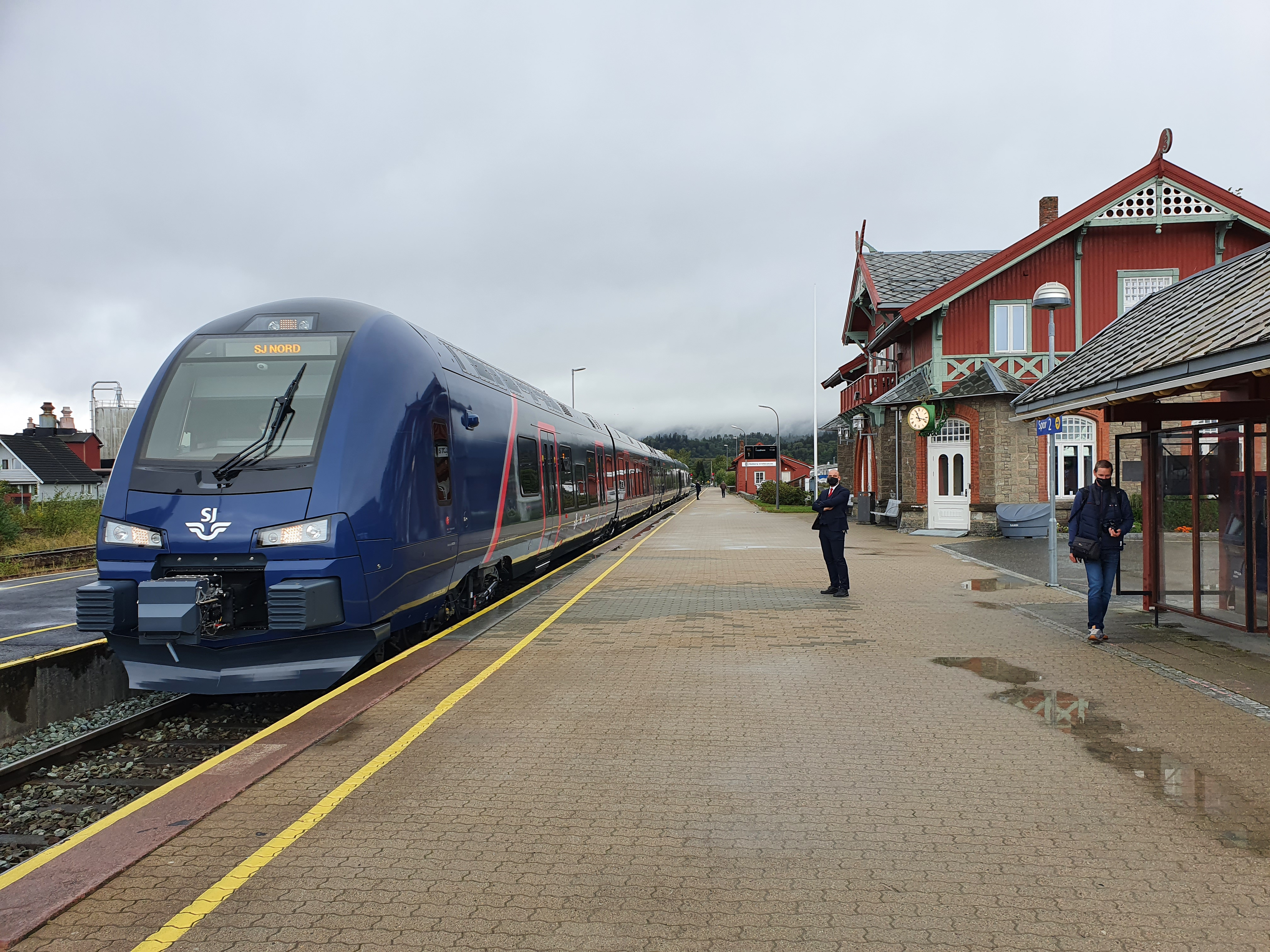
Bi-modal Stadler Flirt for SJ Norge

=== Poland ===
Masovian Railways in 2008 bought 10 four-car 3 kV DC (class ER75) units for services in the Warsaw region. Silesian Railways (KŚ) bought four four-car 3 kV DC units (class EN75) for service in Silesia. Łódź Agglomeration Railway (ŁKA) in 2012 ordered 20 two-car FLIRT3 units for service in the region around Łódź, for delivery by February 2015. PKP Intercity in August 2013 ordered 20 eight-car 3 kV DC FLIRT3 units (class ED160) with interiors for long-distance travel and top speed of 160 km/h (99 mph), for service on four long-distance routes in Poland, from a consortium of Stadler Polska and Newag for delivery by October 2015. In 2018 Masovian Railways started another order of total 61 five-car 3 kV DC FLIRT3 units (class ER160) in five batches slated for deliveries from 2020 to 2022. In 2019 PKP Intercity ordered further twelve eight-car 3 kV DC FLIRT3 units for deliveries through 2023.

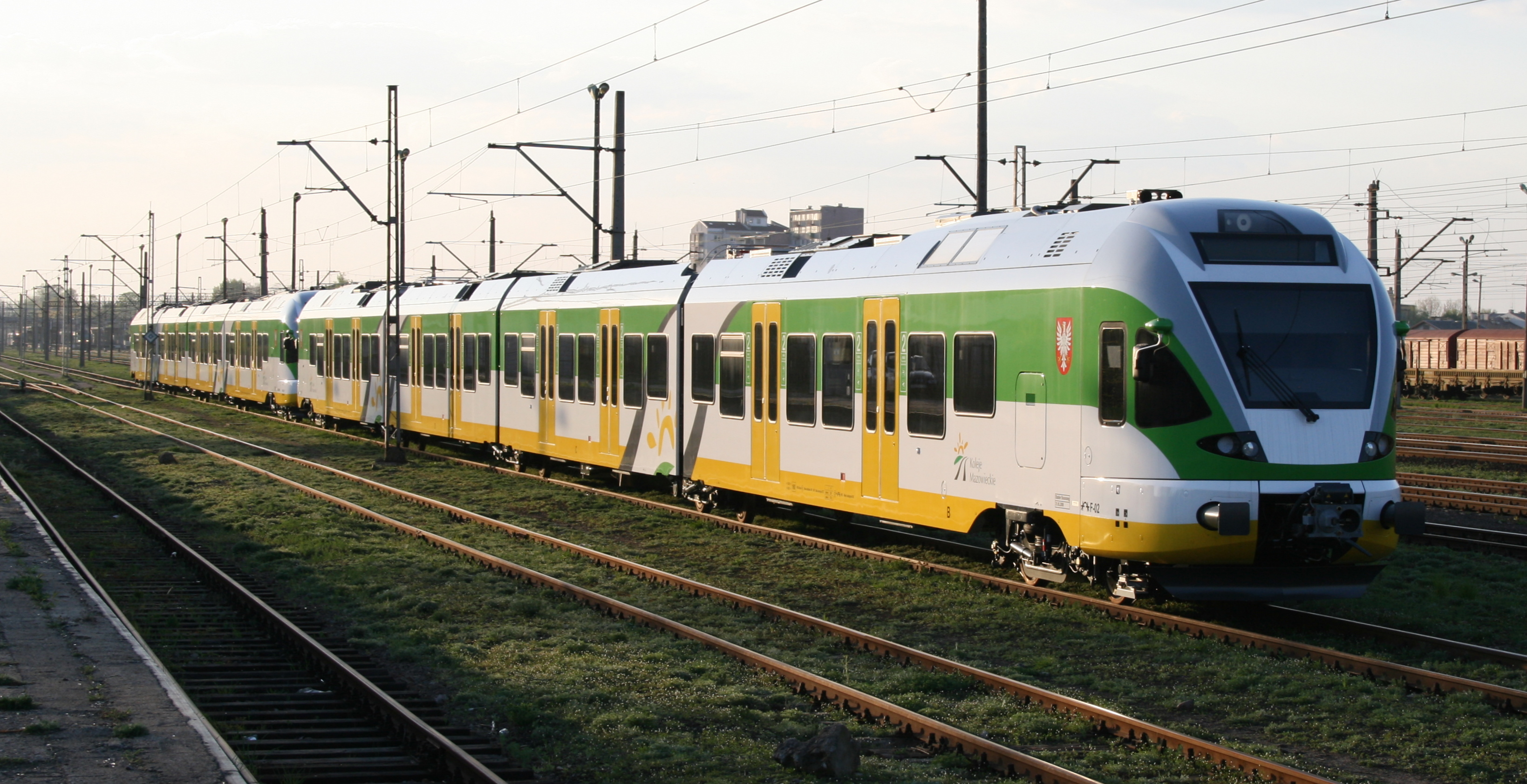
FLIRT for Masovian Railways

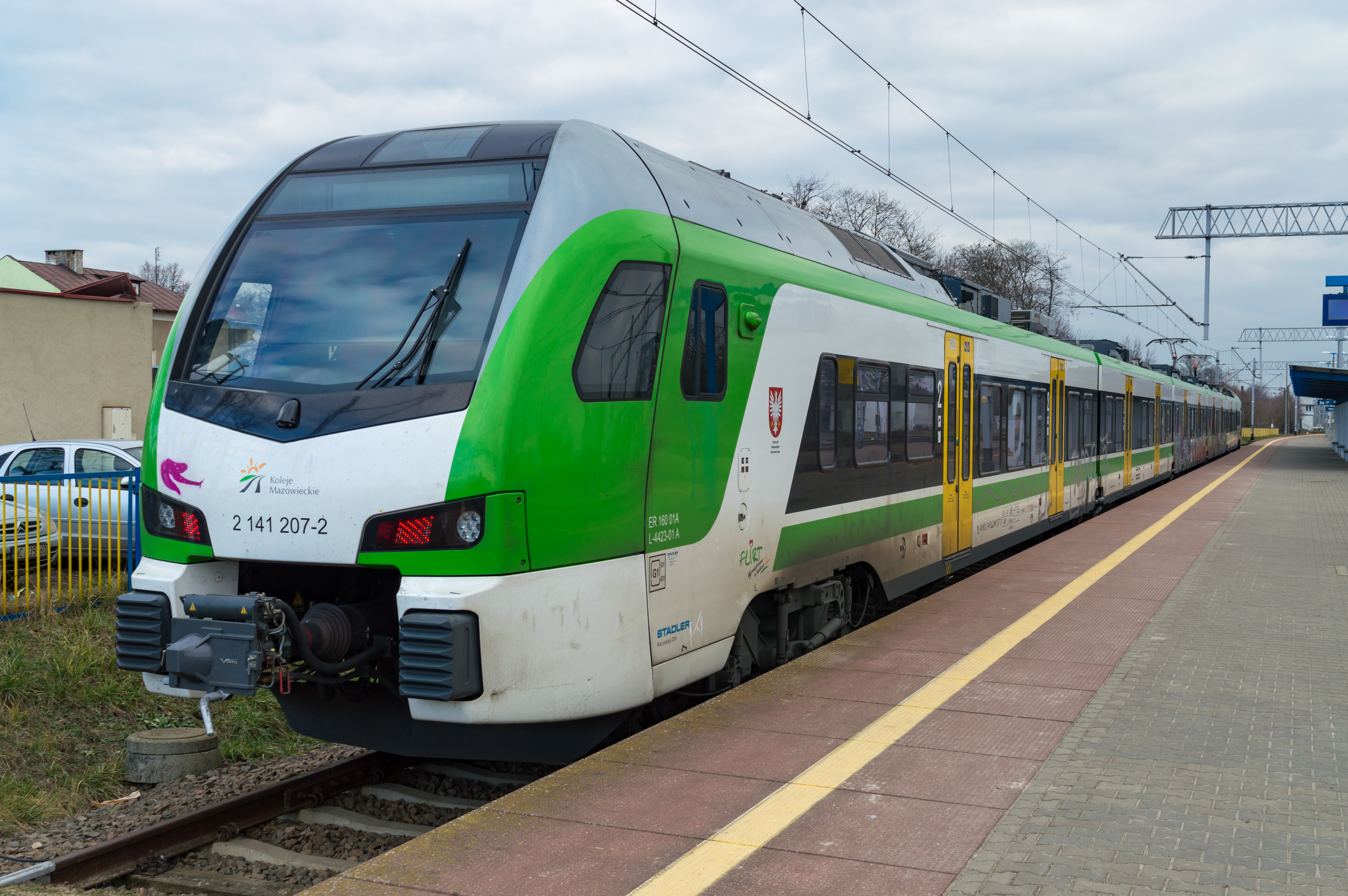
FLIRT3 for Masovian Railways

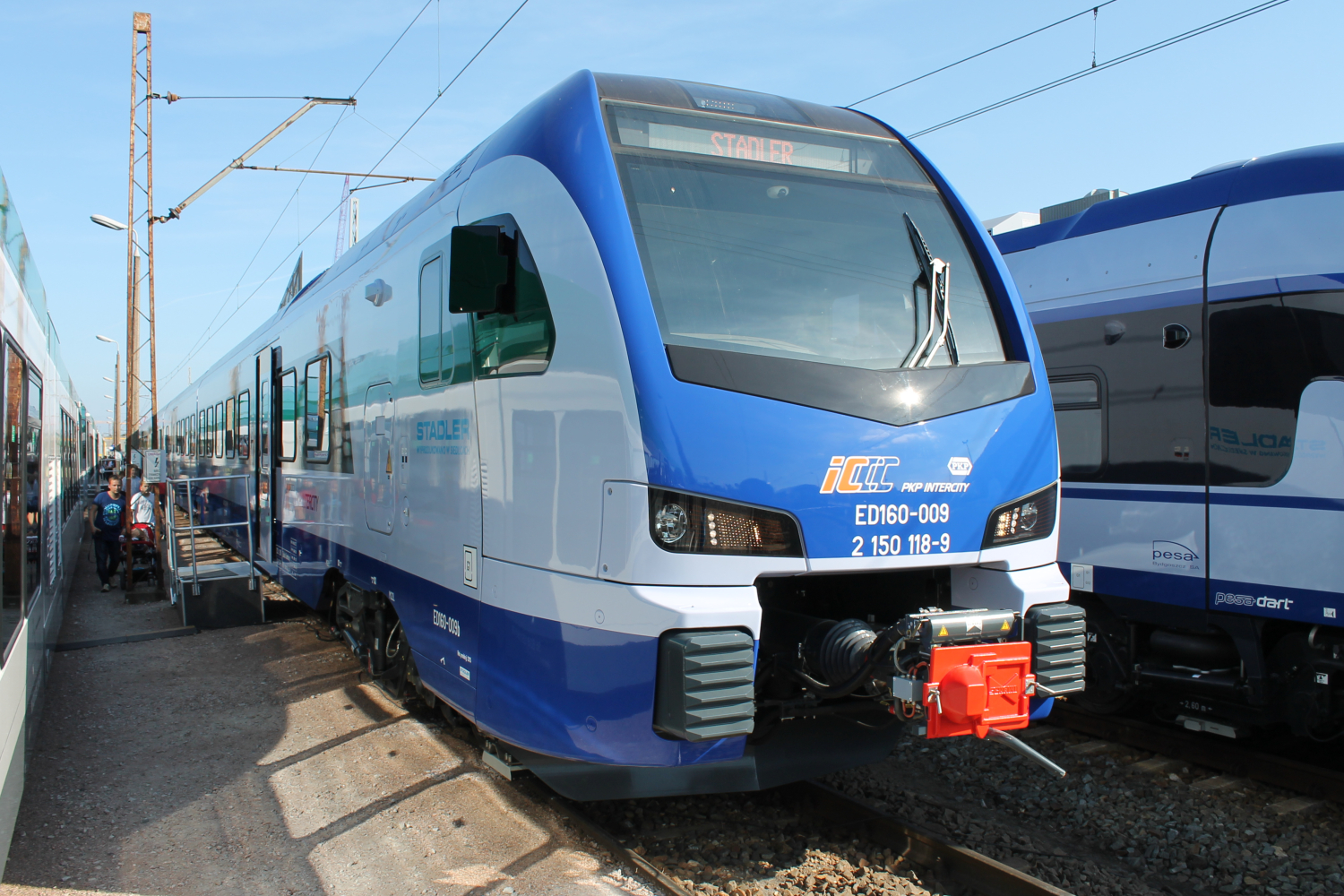
FLIRT 3 for Polish PKP Intercity

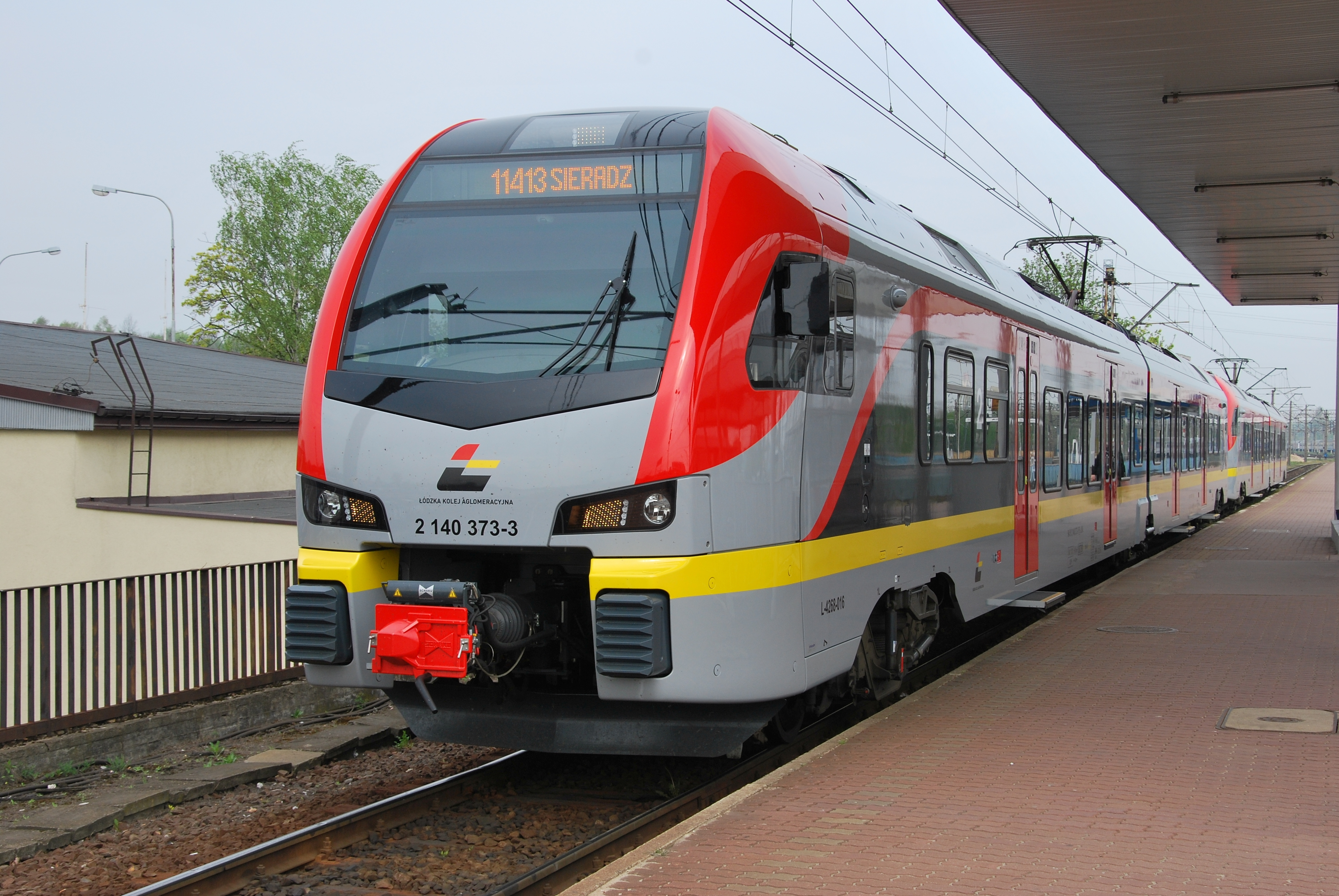
FLIRT 3 for Łódź Agglomeration Railway

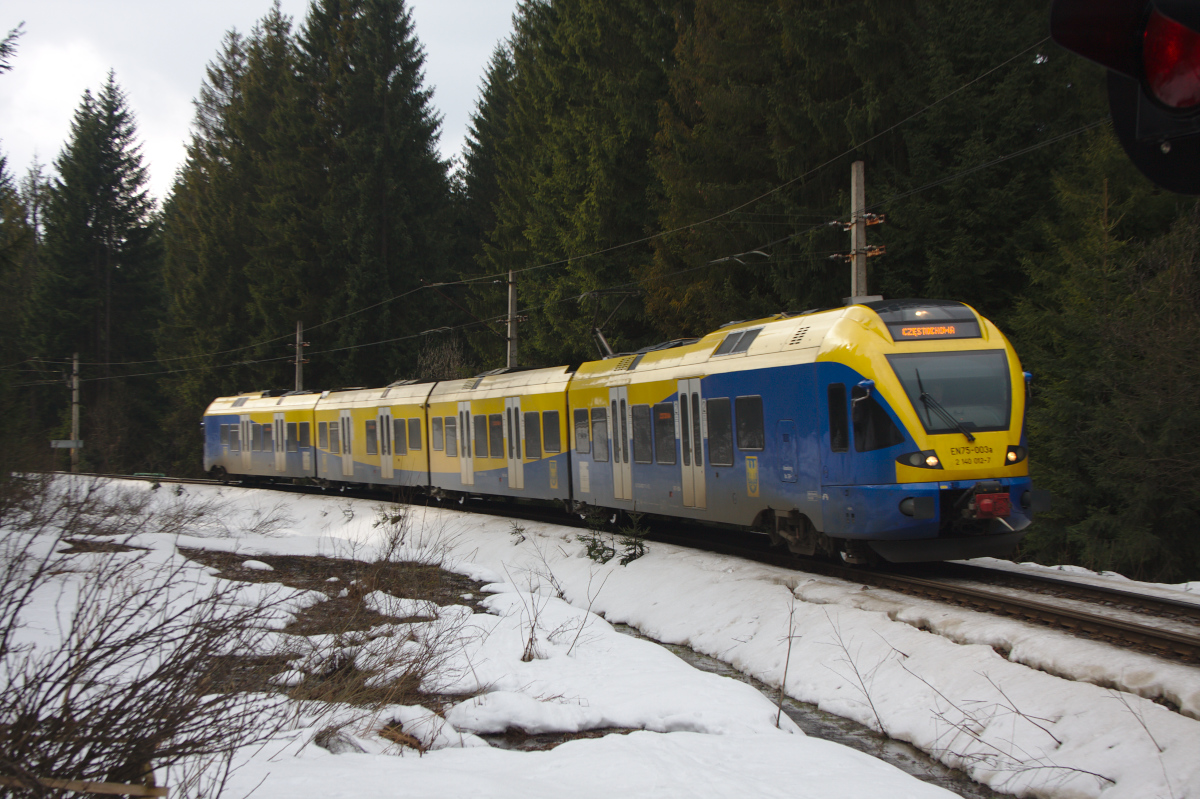
Flirt for Silesian Railways

=== Portugal ===
In October 2020, Comboios de Portugal have ordered a delivery of 22 FLIRT units in 1,668 mm (5 ft 5 21/32 in) for the renewal of its regional fleet, these are the first FLIRT trains in the Iberian Peninsula. This order comprises 10 electric units (EMUs) and 12 bimodal units (BMUs). Electric units will be 63.2 metres (207 ft 4 1/4 in) long with three cars and a top speed of 160 km/h (99 mph). Besides these three cars, bimodal units will also include a removable generator car, making these units 74.4 metres (244 ft 1 1/8 in) long. When powered by the generator, bimodal units will be limited to 140 km/h (87 mph), with the top speed remaining the same as their electric counterparts otherwise. Both units will seat 214 passengers each, with a total capacity of 375 passengers per unit, and will feature "step-free" entrances, room for bycicles and passengers on wheelchairs, and wireless APs. Delivery is delayed, and expected for October 2025.

=== Serbia ===
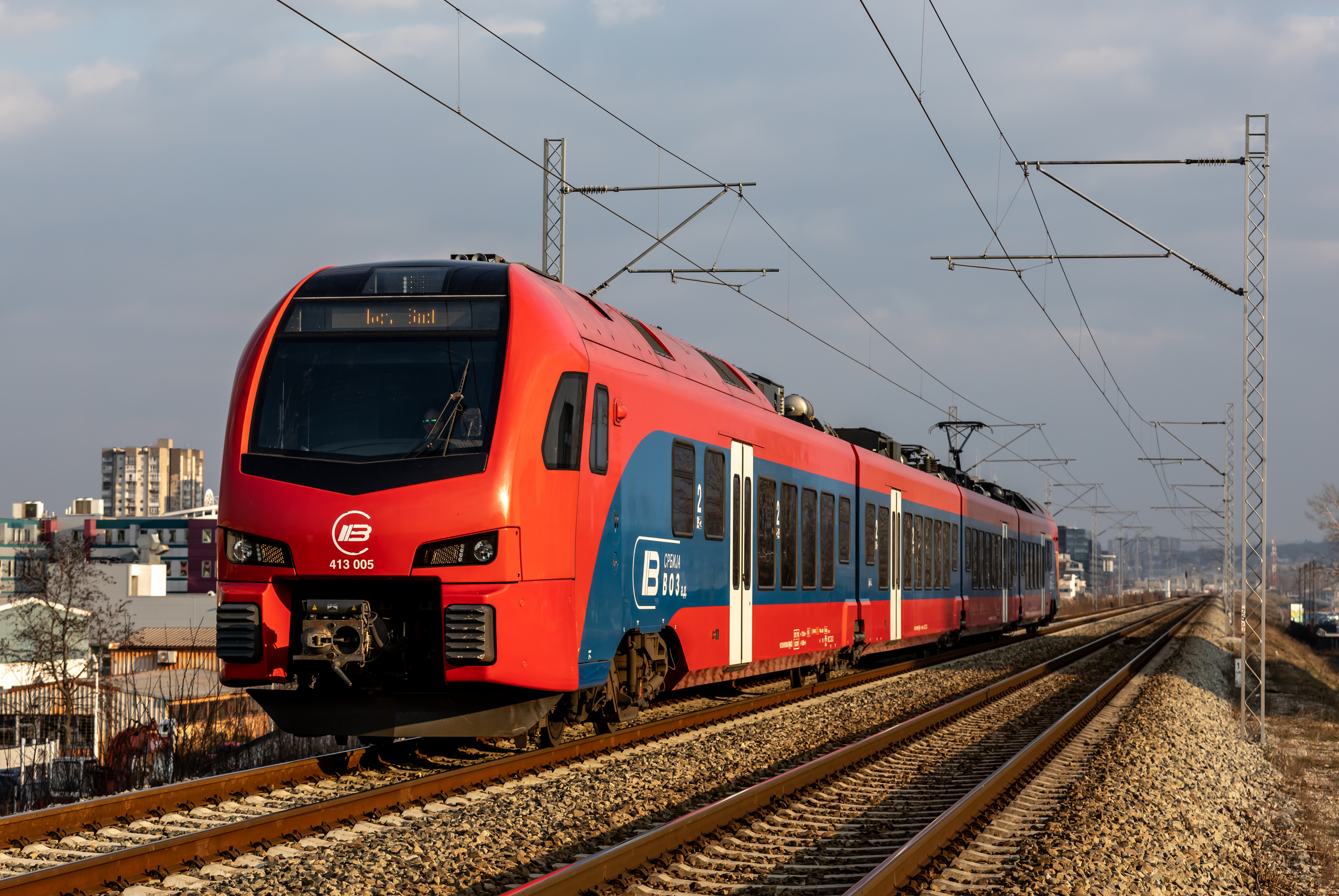
Srbija Voz ŽS 413 approaching Tošin Bunar for a service to Novi Sad

Serbian Railways operates 21 FLIRT 3 four-car EMUs with top speed of 160 km/h for regional traffic which were delivered in 2014 and 2015. In 2022 further 18 units were ordered with deliveries expected to start from October 2023. Trains are numbered ŽS 413/417.

=== Slovenia ===
Slovenian Railways ordered eleven 235-passenger FLIRT EMUs (SŽ 510/515) and five 171-passenger DMUs (SŽ 610/615) in April 2018, for delivery by early 2020 and exercised an option for a further 10 EMUs and 16 DMUs in May 2019 for delivery by late 2021, bringing the total order up to 21 four-car EMUs and 21 three-car DMUs. Together with 10 Stadler KISS units there are 52 Stadler trainsets in Slovenia as of October 2022.

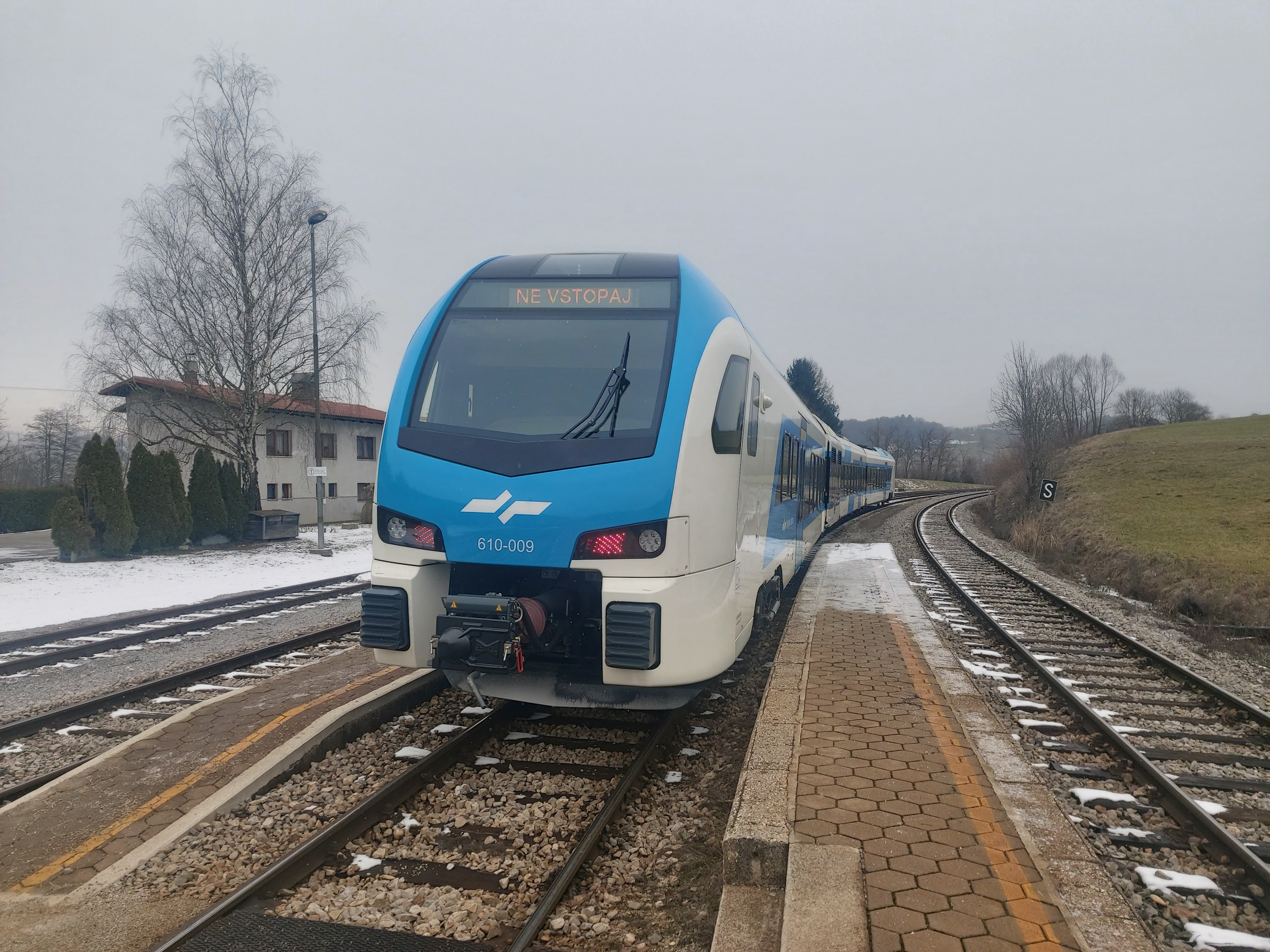
SŽ 610/615

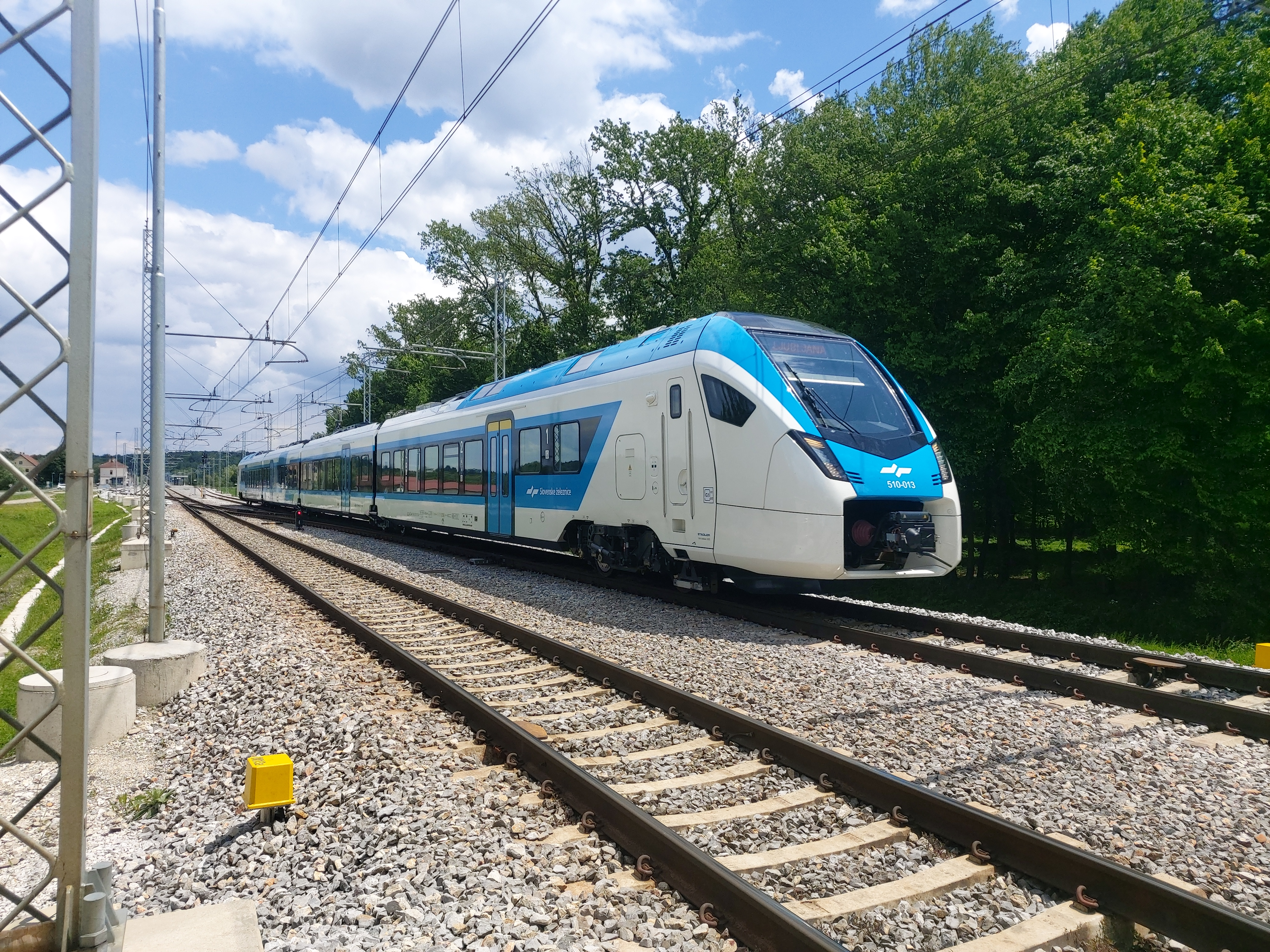
SŽ 510/515

=== Spain ===
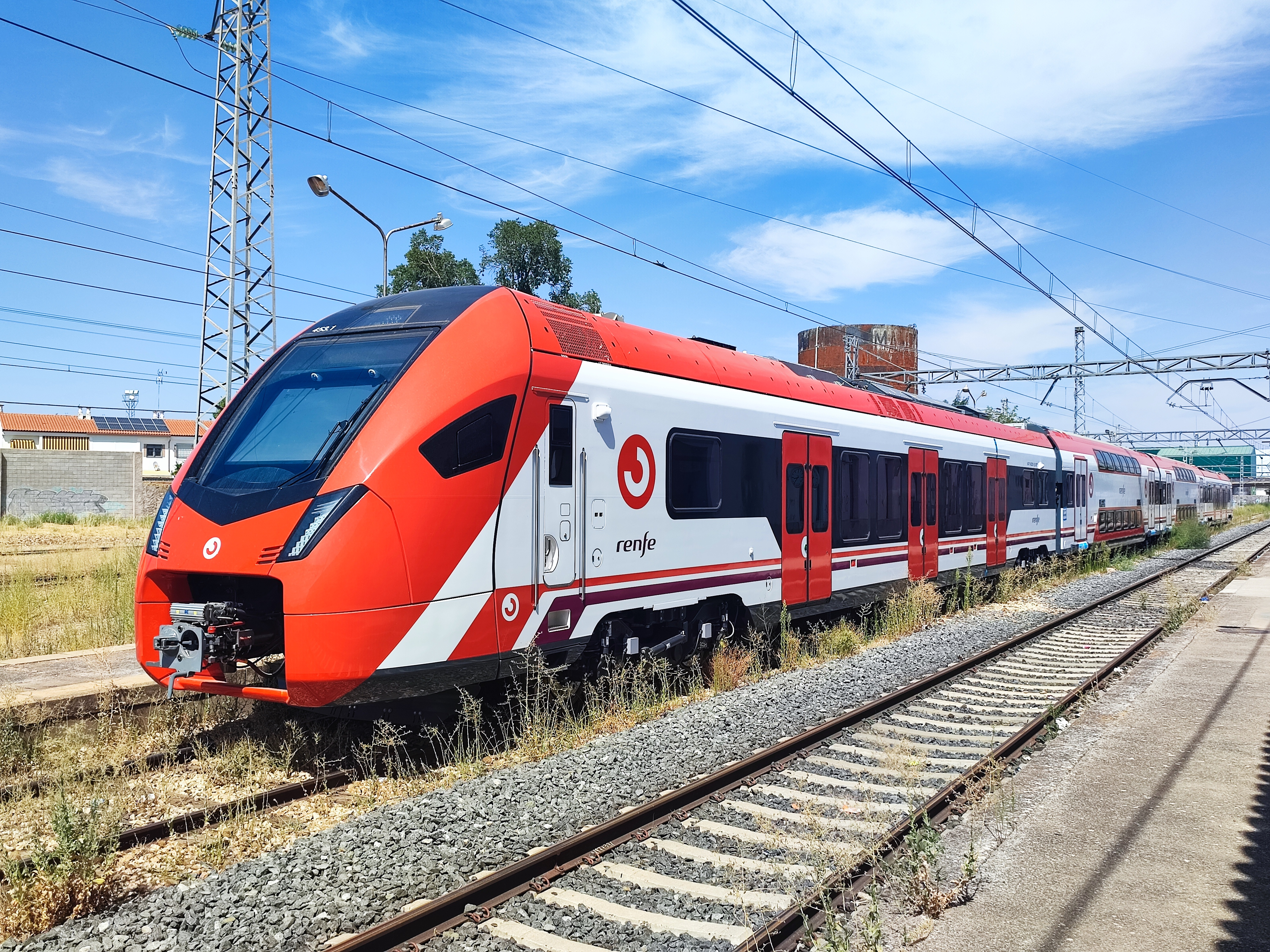
Renfe Class 453 trainset under testing

Renfe's Cercanías division ordered 24 100 m (328 ft 1 in) trains and 55 200 m (656 ft 2 in) combined FLIRT/KISS EMUs classified as Renfe Class 453 in 1,668 mm (5 ft 5 21/32 in) for Cercanías Madrid in 2021, which are expected to enter service in 2025, replacing older rolling stock dating from the 1970s to the early 1990s. The 100 m variants will consist of two single-deck FLIRT end cars connected to two bilevel KISS intermediate cars, while the 200 m variants will feature two additional single-deck FLIRT intermediate cars.

=== Sweden ===
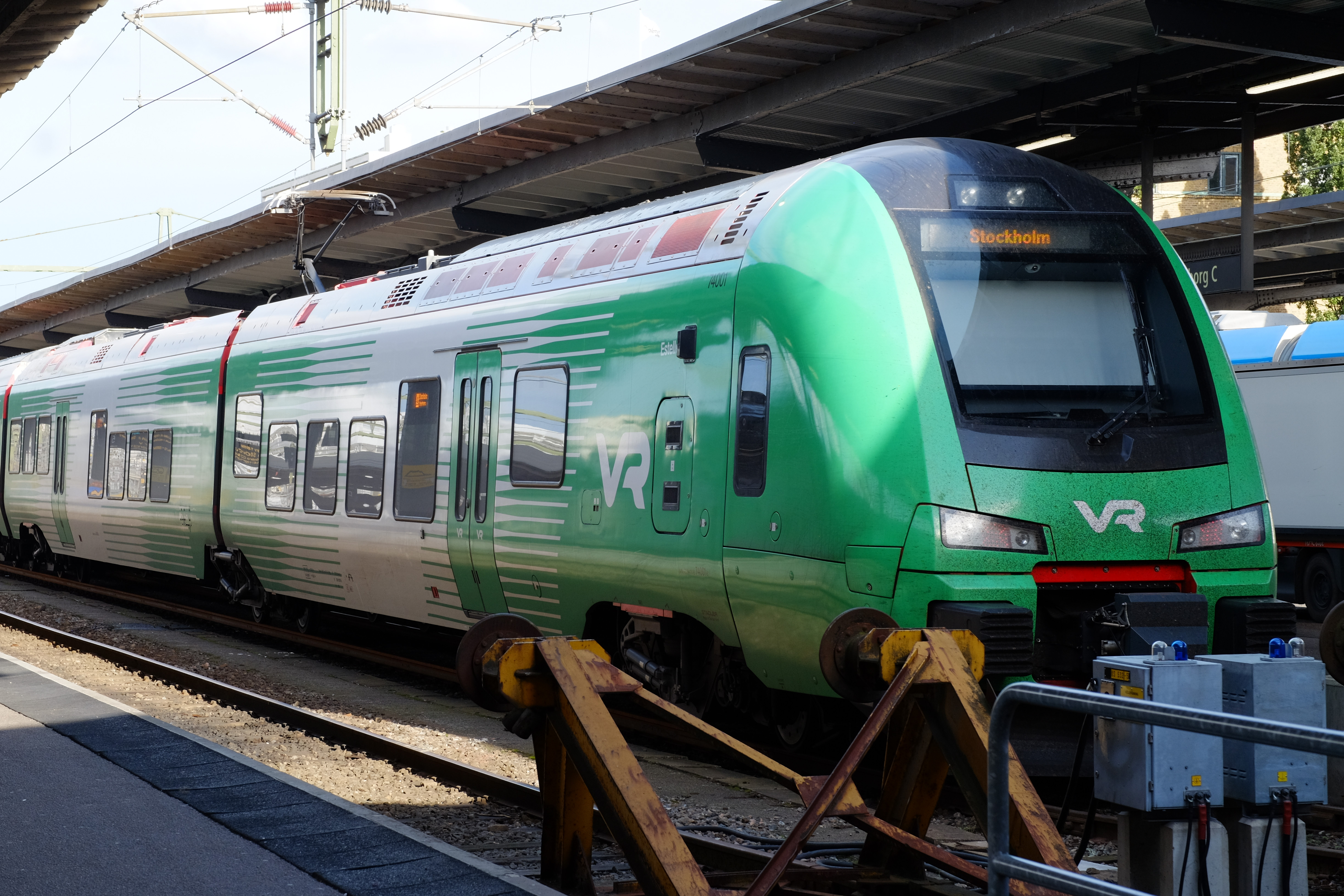
X74 trainset at Gothenburg Central Station

VR Snabbtåg Sverige (then MTRX) ordered six Flirt EMUs for inter-city operation between Stockholm and Gothenburg. They are very similar to the Norwegian units, maximum 200 km/h, but have more comfortable seats aimed for longer distances, and a small café area. The first unit was delivered in November 2014. They started customer operation in March 2015.

=== Switzerland ===
The Swiss Federal Railways were Stadler's first customer for the FLIRT when they ordered 42 units with options for 100 more in September 2002. The first vehicle was delivered in 2004 for the use on the Stadtbahn Zug.

Meanwhile, the Swiss Federal Railways have ordered a total of 117 units that can be broken down into four different types that differ in their equipment for driving in neighboring countries. The base version is the class RABe 523 that is used on the Stadtbahn Zug and the RER Vaud. These 43 4-section units can only be used within Switzerland. The 30 RABe 521 and 14 RABe 522 are versions that can also be used in Germany and France respectively. They also consist of four sections and are used on the Basel S-Bahn. The last version is the Italy-capable RABe 524/ETR 150 that is used on Treni Regionali Ticino Lombardia (TILO) services in Ticino and northern Italy. The first 19 units of this type to be delivered were four sections long, and were followed by eleven units ordered that six-sections long and are additionally equipped with the ETCS Level 2 train control system.

In December 2018, SBB ordered seven trains, with an option of seven more. They will be manufactured 2019–2021. Each train has four single-deck cars, with a total of 27 seats in first class and 154 in second class. The SBB name is 'Mouette' (lit. 'Seagull').

BLS selected Stadler for 58 six-car EMU sets in May 2017 for service on RegioExpress and Bern S-Bahn routes, with delivery scheduled to take place between 2021 and 2026. The contract was signed in January 2018, but the quantity was reduced to 52 sets.

In October 2021, the Swiss Federal Railways selected the FLIRT in a new contract, for 286 trainsets and an option for 224 additional ones (up to 510). The contract is worth up to CHF 2 billion. Alstom brought an appeal to court, which was rejected in May 2022, confirming the contract. The order will also include trainsets for SBB's subsidiaries Thurbo and RegionAlps.They are planned to be delivered between 2026 and 2034. They will replace the first generation of Stadler FLIRT, and also the Domino train sets.

Besides the Swiss Federal Railways two other companies in Switzerland operate FLIRT trains: The Südostbahn (SOB) uses several trains with the designation RABe 526 (FLIRT and FLIRT-III, including the Traverso used as Voralpen Express, Treno Gottardo, Aare-Linth and Alpenrhein-Express). The Transports Publics Neuchâtelois (TransN) owns three RABe 527 and four RABe 523 trains.

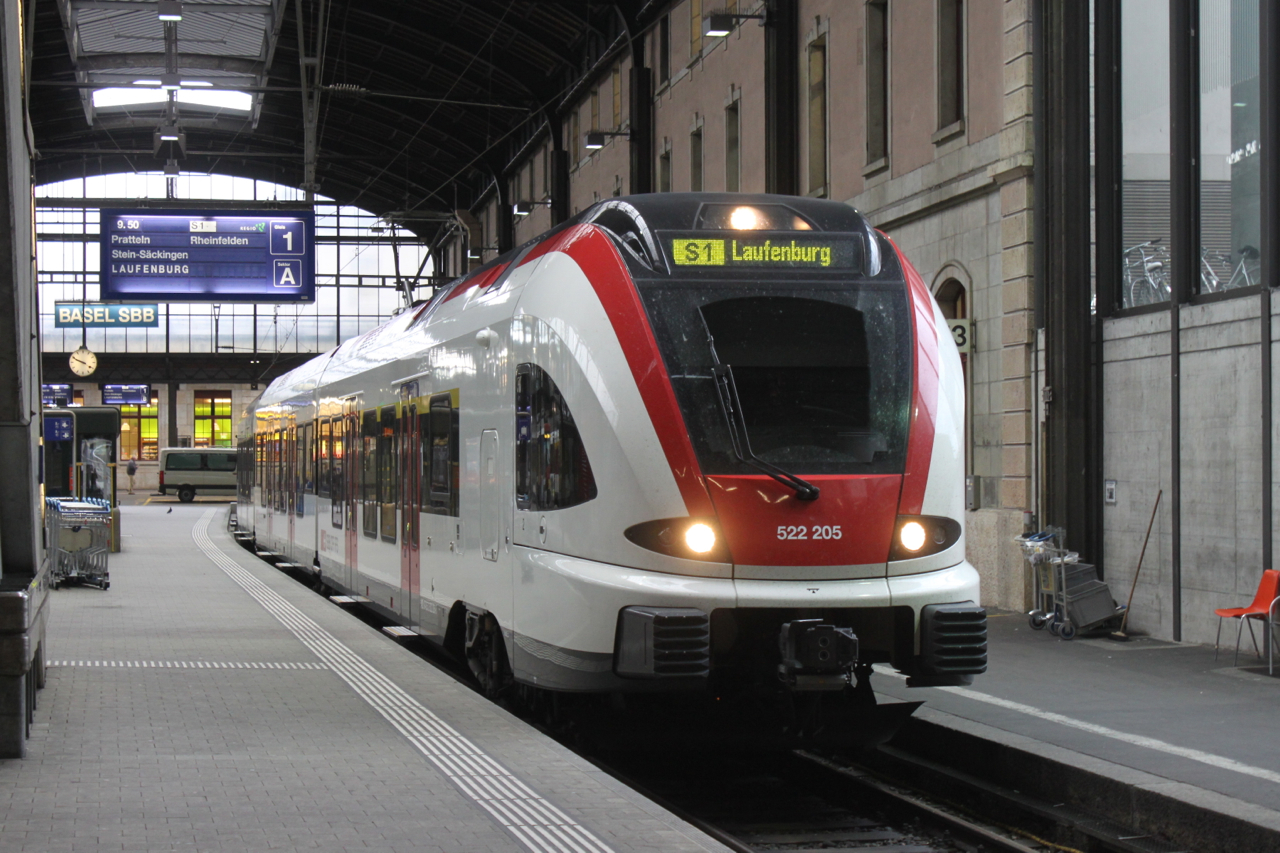
RABe 522 of the Swiss Federal Railways at Basel SBB

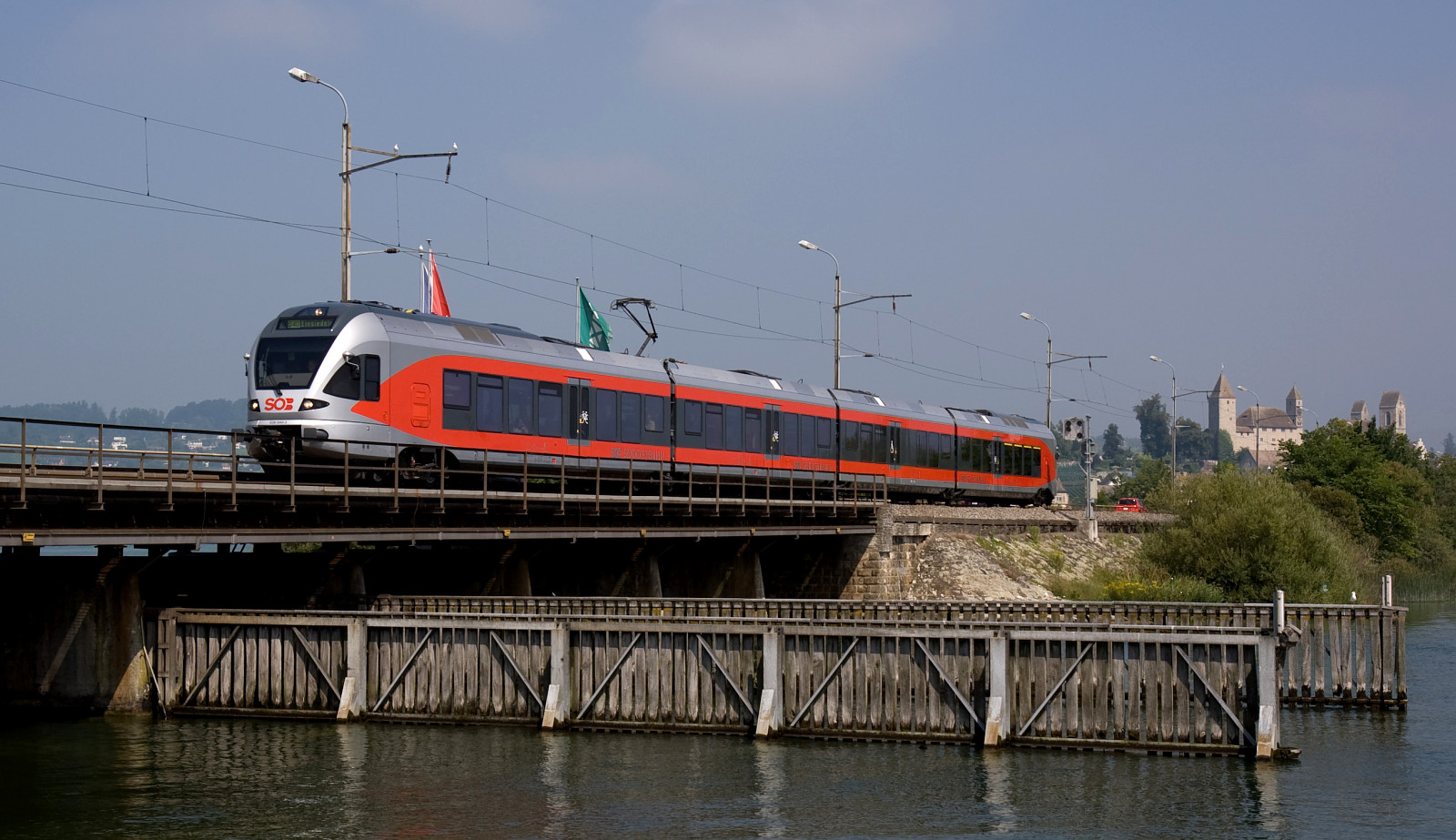
Stadler FLIRT of the Swiss Südostbahn on Seedamm

=== United Kingdom ===
In August 2016 Greater Anglia selected Stadler FLIRT electric and bi-mode units for the East Anglia franchise to replace its Class 90 electric locomotives, Mark 3 carriages and Driving Van Trailers, Class 153, 156 and 170 diesel multiple units, and Class 379 electric multiple units. This comprised 14 three-car and 24 four-car bi-mode multiple units (Class 755) and 20 twelve-car electric multiple units (Class 745) (of which ten will be used for Stansted Express and ten for Intercity services).

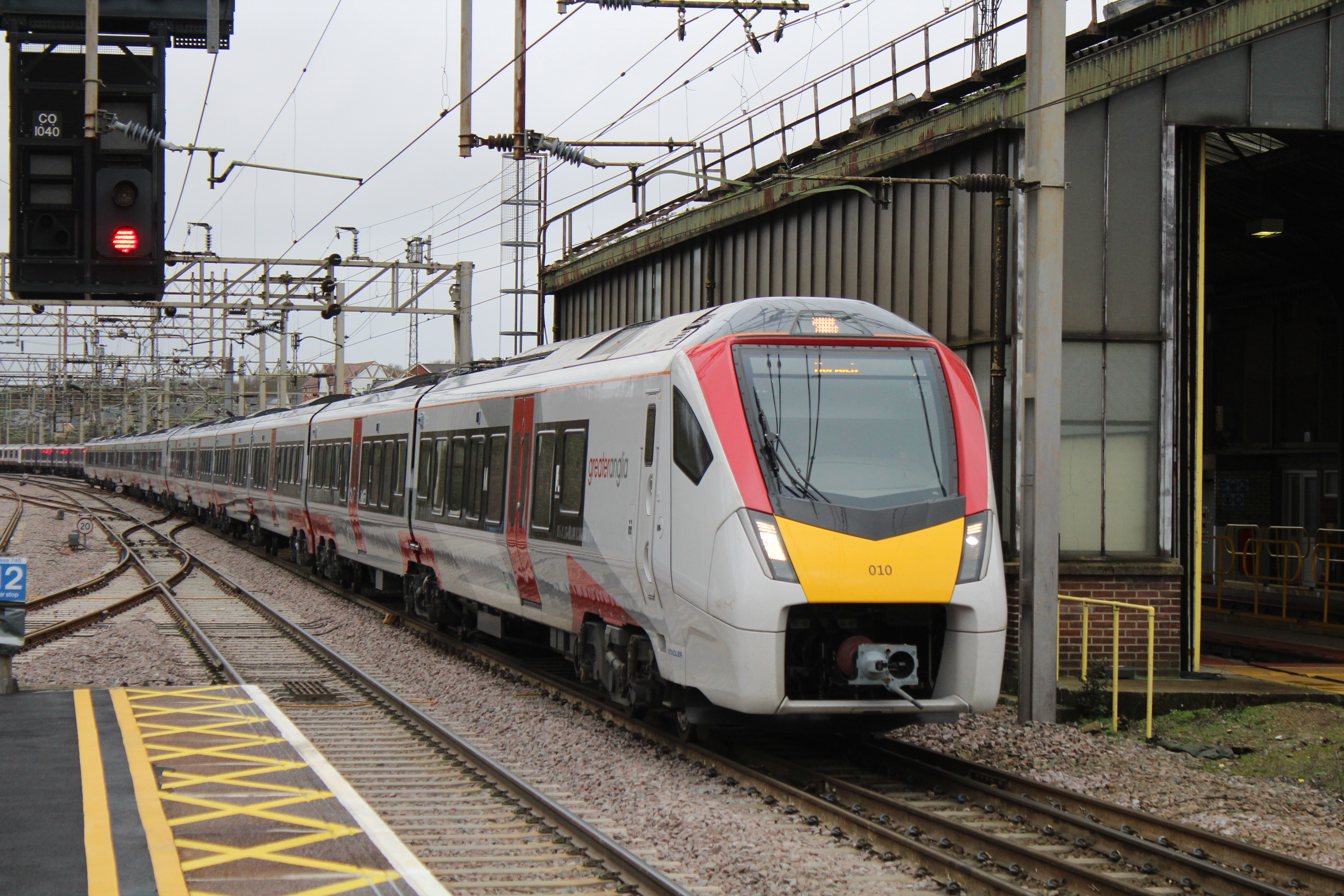
Stadler electric FLIRT Class 745 for Greater Anglia

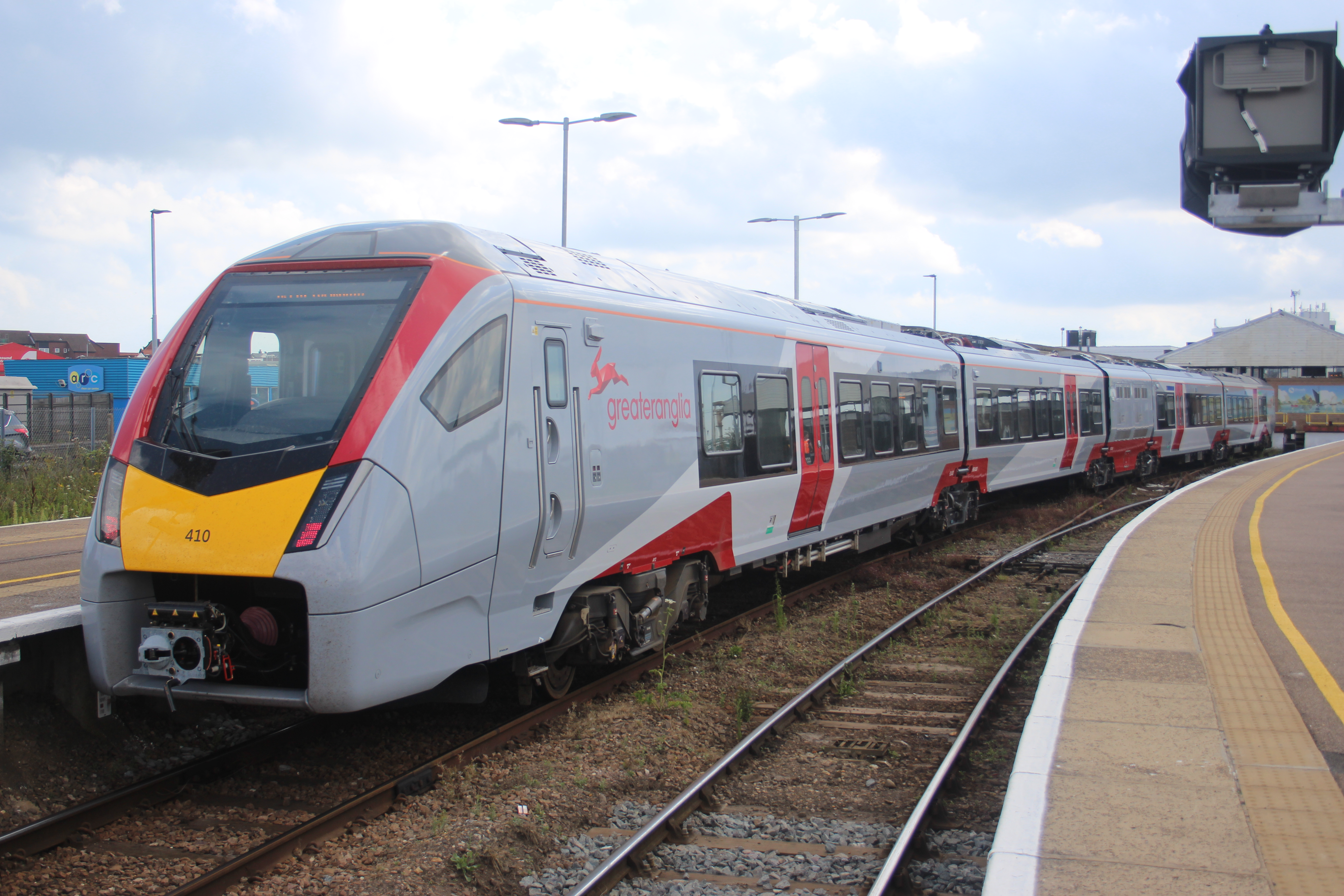
Stadler bi-mode FLIRT Class 755 for Greater Anglia

==== Wales ====
In June 2018, KeolisAmey Wales announced it would purchase 35 FLIRT trains: 24 (seven three-car and 17 four-car) tri-mode Class 756 units and eleven four-car diesel-electric Class 231 units for the South Wales Metro, later in 2018, the Welsh Government body Transport for Wales awarded the contract for the Wales and Borders franchise to KeolisAmey in 2018 which commenced rail operations on 14 October 2018. KeolisAmey used the brand names Transport for Wales and TfW Rail (Welsh: Trafnidiaeth Cymru and TrC Trenau), which are owned by the Welsh Government, for day-to-day operations. The Welsh Government nationalised the franchise on 7 February 2021, transferring operations to Transport for Wales Rail, although Amey continues to provide an infrastructural role in the franchise, particularly on the South Wales Metro.

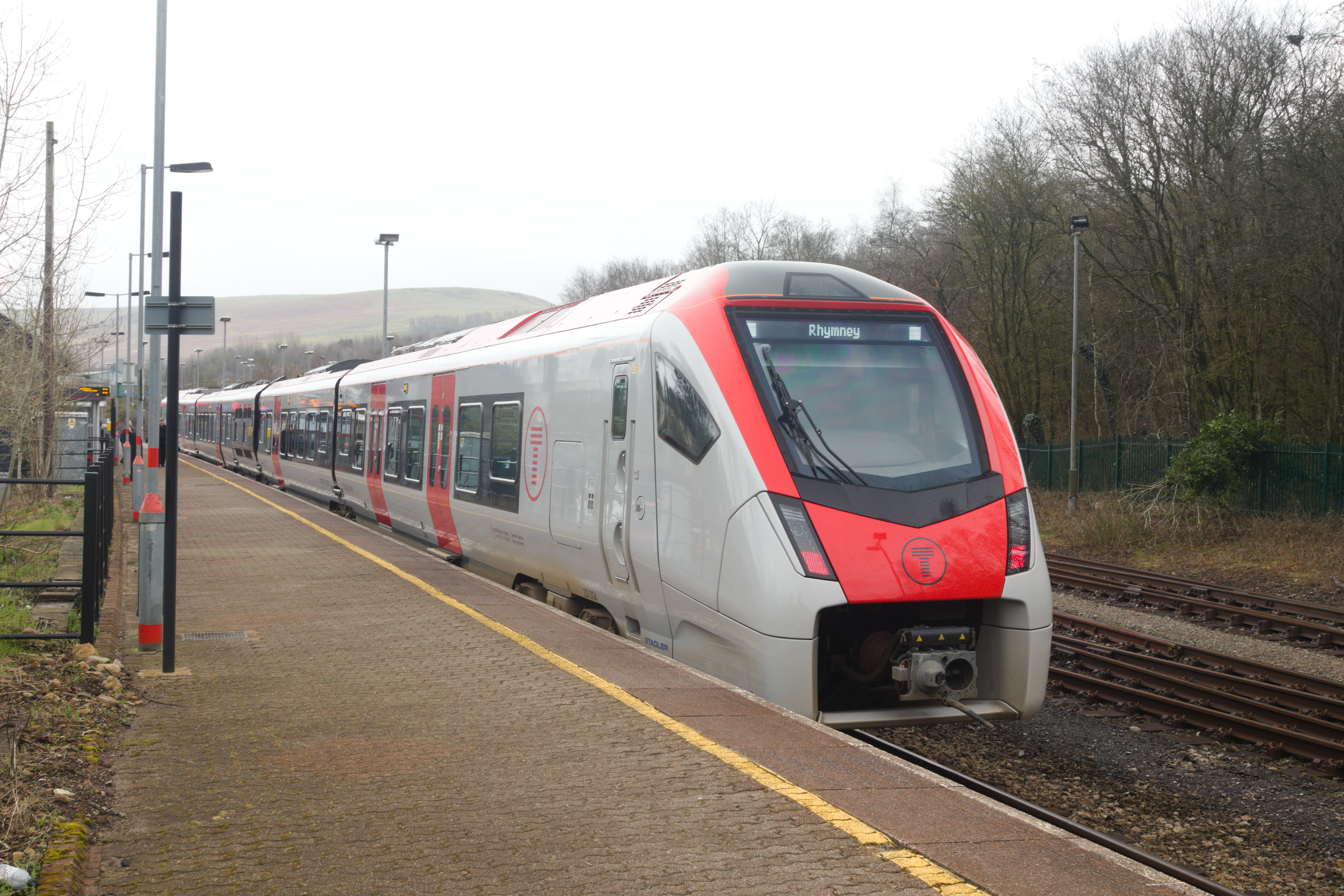
Stadler diesel-electric FLIRT Class 231 at Rhymney

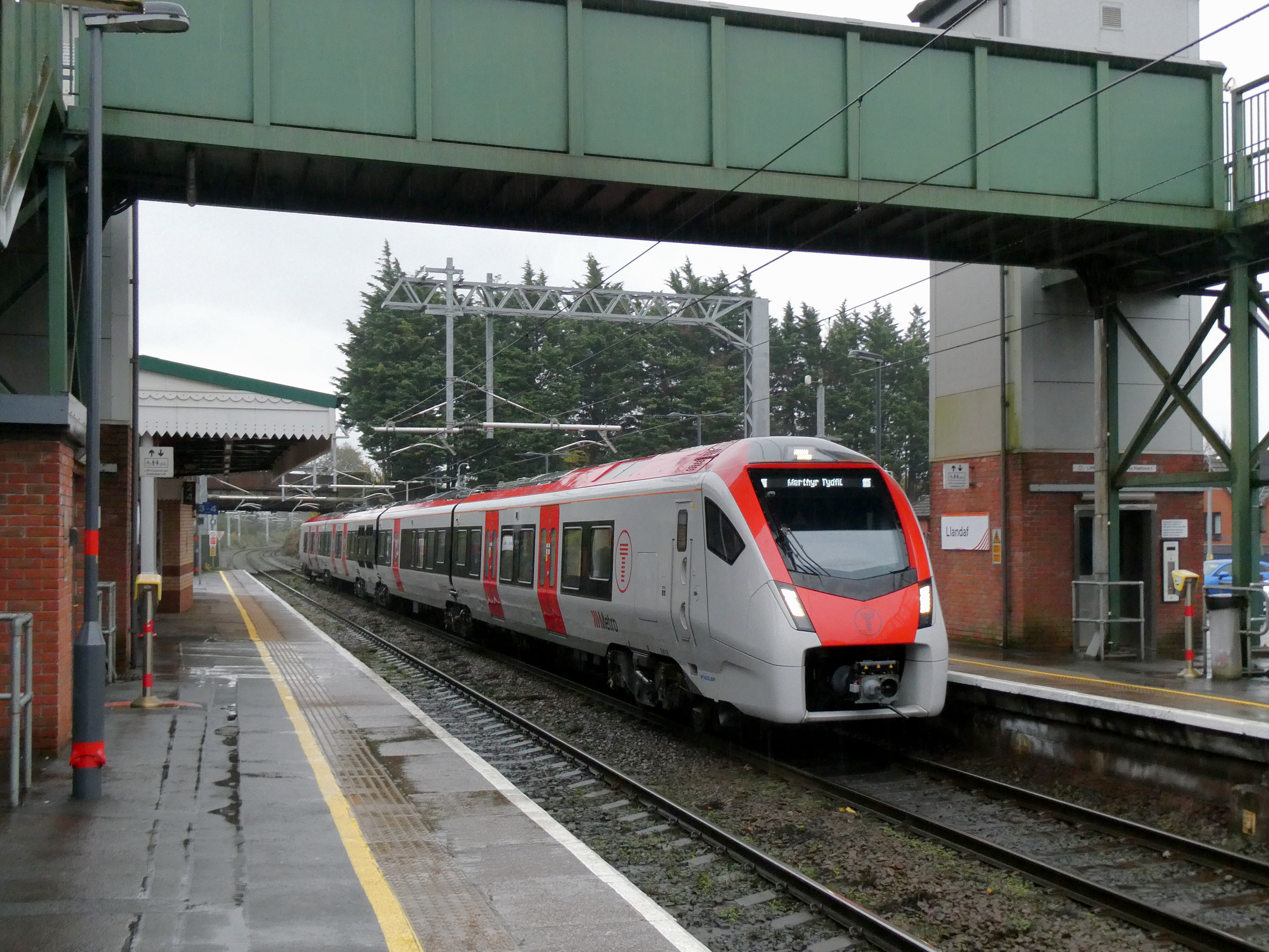
Stadler tri-mode FLIRT Class 756 at Llandaf

=== United States ===
On 9 June 2015, Trinity Metro signed a contract for the supply of eight four-car articulated FLIRT3 diesel-electric multiple units for the TEXRail commuter line, which opened in January 2019. The contract was signed at a ceremony held at Fort Worth Central Station. The contract is valued at $107 million, and includes the supply of components for 10 years. The contract also includes an option for an additional 24 DMUs. This was Stadler's first order for its FLIRT family in the US (previous orders had been for the GTW), and the first to include US federal funding and thus be subject to the Buy America Act. As such, one element of the contract was that the final assembly of the trains would take place in the US, and several assembly sites, such as in nearby Lewisville, Texas, were considered for the facility. Stadler eventually leased space from the Utah Transit Authority in their former Union Pacific shops in Salt Lake City, Utah.

Public unveiling events for the completed American-built FLIRT units occurred in both Atlanta, Georgia on 9 October 2017 and Salt Lake City, on the Salt Lake, Garfield and Western Railway, on 13 October 2017 as Stadler broke ground for their permanent Salt Lake facility.

Three two-car FLIRT sets were built for the Arrow commuter rail service in Redlands, California, which started operation in 2022. The $31.4 million contract includes the vehicles themselves, spare parts, and training for servicing and operation. In November 2019, the San Bernardino County Transportation Authority ordered an additional FLIRT powered via hydrogen fuel cell, the first such train in the United States. In September 2022, an order of four additional hydrogen-powered trains was announced by Stadler and CalSTA for Amtrak California inter-city services.

Eight four-car sets entered service with Dallas Area Rapid Transit on the Silver Line when it opened on 25 October 2025.

In February 2024, Metra ordered 16 battery electric multiple unit models, expected to be delivered in January 2028, for use on the Beverly Branch of the Rock Island Line or North Central Service.

In February 2026, the Utah Department of Transportation and Utah Transit Authority ordered ten diesel-powered models for use on the FrontRunner commuter rail line.

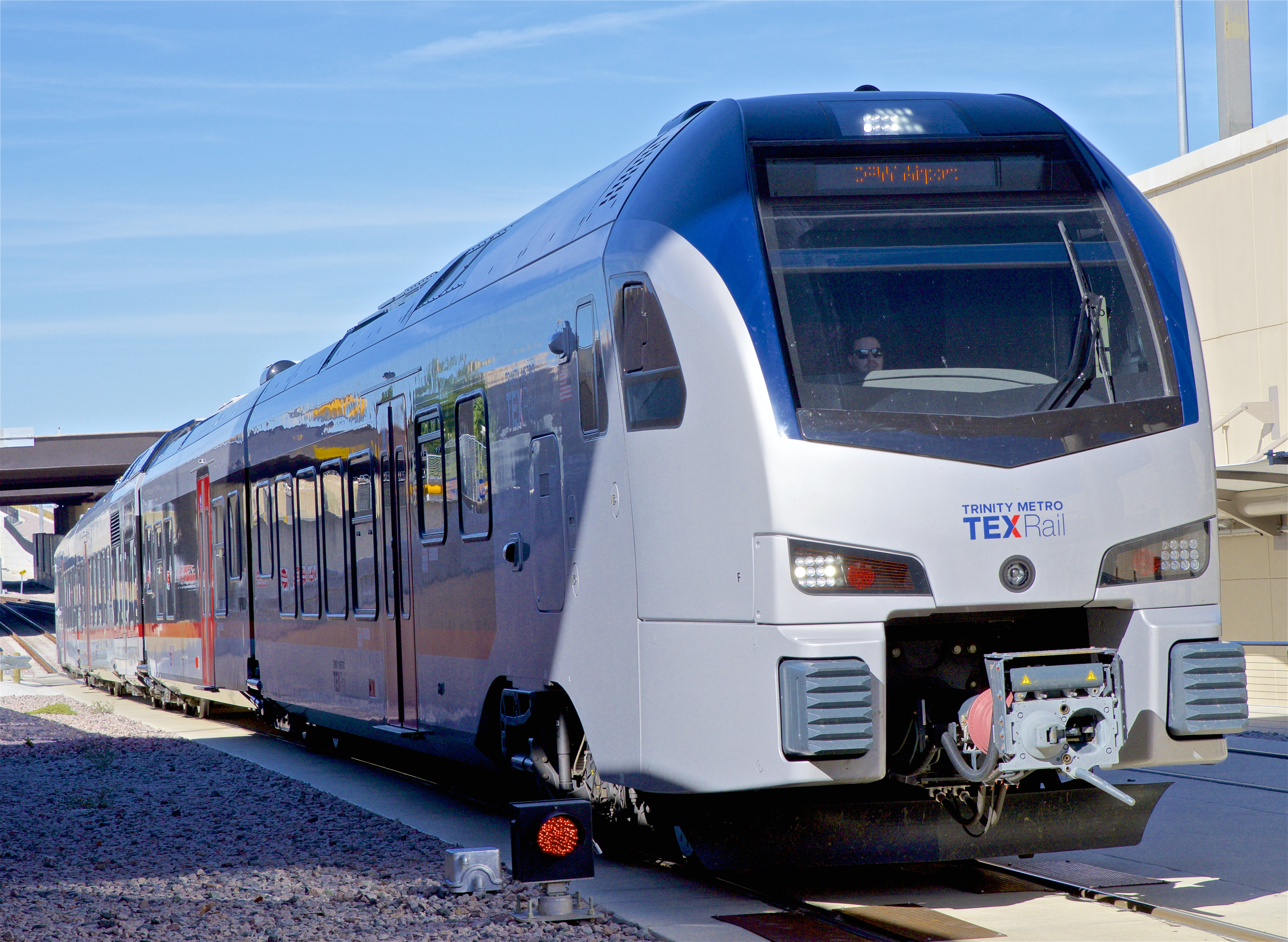
FLIRT for TEXRail at DFW Airport Terminal B station, 2019

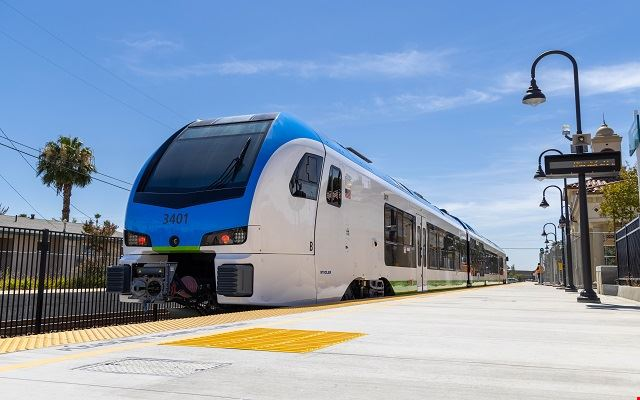
FLIRT for Arrow at Redlands–University station, 2022

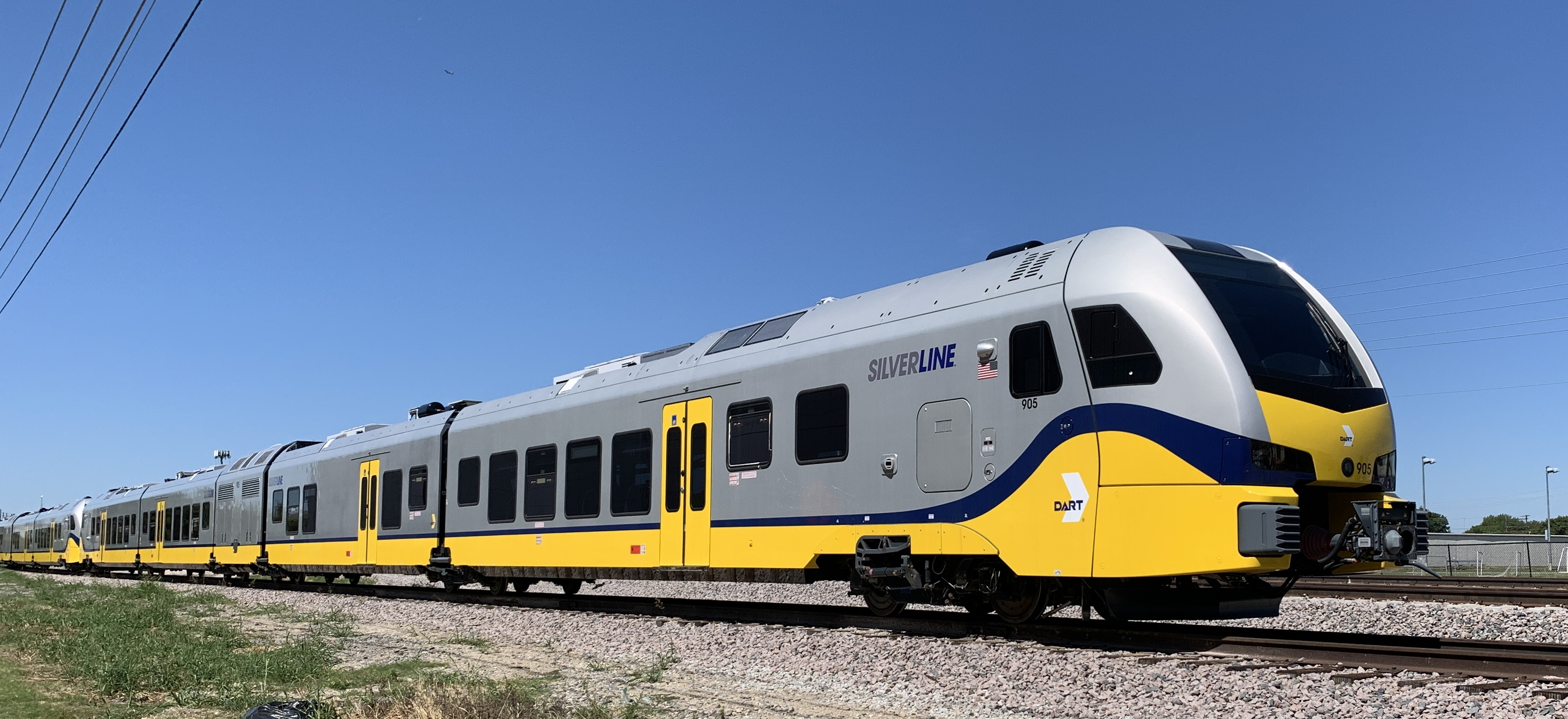
FLIRT for DART Silver Line near Shiloh Road station, 2024

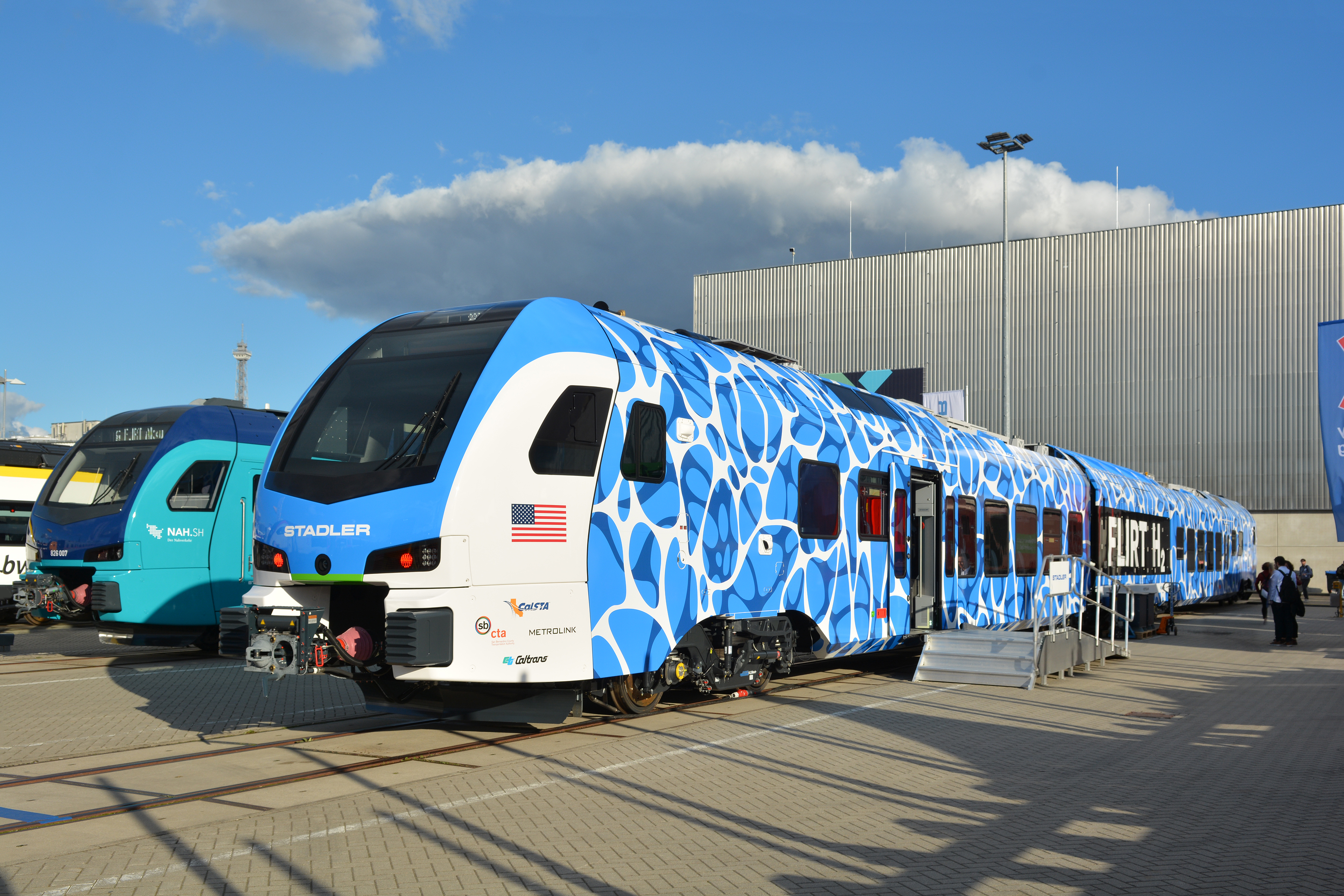
The hydrogen-powered FLIRT for Arrow

FLIRT for Metra on display at APTA EXPO 2026

== Cancelled contracts ==
=== Latvia ===
On 1 July 2014 Latvian rail operator Pasažieru vilciens announced that it would acquire FLIRT trains as part of a hire/purchase contract, however Pv owner Latvian Railways ultimately withdrew the contract and no procurement went ahead.

== Accidents and incidents ==
- On 15 February 2012, a FLIRT unit used for tests and driver education, without passengers, derailed near Holmestrand in Norway, injuring five people. The train had been entering a bend at 135 km/h (84 mph) instead of the allowed maximum speed of 70 km/h (43 mph). The train driver was convicted of negligence but given a conditional discharge by the court who also faulted the lack of safety systems that could catch the driver's error.
- On 16 April 2014, a FLIRT operated by Elron heading from Tallinn to Tartu was involved in an accident in Raasiku. A dump truck hit the third wagon at a level crossing, causing multiple wagons to derail. One female passenger aged 43 was killed, 12 people received injuries. The dump truck driver, a man aged 59, received fatal injuries. The damaged units were repaired and resumed service.
- On 5 November 2014, a FLIRT operated by SNTF derailed in Hussein-Dey, on the eastern suburb of Algiers in Algeria, it was heading to Thenia, 50 kilometers from the capital, the train was supposed to be commuted to a passing loop at 150 m from Hussein-Dey train station to allow the fast Algiers-Oran to overtake, because the latter is not programmed to stop at that station, the train derailed on the switch at a higher speed than limited, the accident killed a 55-year-old woman and injured 70, according to the local authorities.
- On 16 May 2015, a FLIRT operated by WestfalenBahn was involved in a collision on a level crossing at Ibbenbüren, North Rhine-Westphalia, Germany. Two people were killed and twenty were injured. The train was scrapped.
- On 9 February 2016, two FLIRTs operated by the Bayerische Oberlandbahn were involved in a head-on collision near Bad Aibling, Germany. 11 people were killed, 80 were injured.
- On 12 July 2016, a FLIRT was involved in a head-on collision at Andria, Apulia, Italy that killed 23 people.
- On 5 June 2017, a FLIRT operated by Leo Express ignored a stop signal and crashed into a buffer stop at Přerov, Czech republic. 18 people were injured including staff.
- On 24 November 2019, a Class 755 train operated by Greater Anglia was approaching a level crossing at Thorpe End, Norfolk, England at 45 miles per hour (72 km/h) when the barriers lifted as the train was 220 yards (200 m) from the crossing and cars started crossing in front of the train. Despite emergency braking, the train was unable to stop before the crossing. A collision was avoided by half a second. The Rail Accident Investigation Branch's report on the incident was released on 14 December 2020. In response to the incident, Greater Anglia imposed a 20-mile-per-hour (32 km/h) speed restriction over five level crossings on the Bittern Line.
- On 24 August 2023, a FLIRT ER160-22 operated by Masovian Railways, passed red signal and collided with ET41-121 operated by PKP Cargo in Skierniewice, Poland.

== Fleet details ==
Class	Operator (Note: Operator when the vehicle was originally built; if the vehicle is currently operated by another company, please state this in the 'Notes' column.)	No. built	Year built	Cars per set	Unit nos.	Notes
Austria
Rh 4750	ÖBB	16	2025-2026	3		FLIRT Akku BEMU (15+25 kV) to be operated on Kamptalbahn line.
Azerbaijan
EŞR	Azerbaijan Railways CJSC	3		5	EŞR‑001 – EŞR‑003	FLIRT^{G} EMU R (25 kV, 1520 mm gauge), designed for regional traffic. The 'G' indicates that they comply with GOST standards.
EŞI	Azerbaijan Railways CJSC	3		5	EŞI‑001 – EŞI‑003	FLIRT^{G} EMU IR (25 kV, 1520 mm gauge), designed for interregional traffic.
DŞI	Azerbaijan Railways CJSC	4		5	DŞI‑001 – DŞI‑004	FLIRT^{G} DMU IR (1520 mm gauge), designed for interregional traffic.
Belarus
	BZD	10	2010-2012	4		FLIRT EMU (25 kV).
	BZD	6	2014	5		FLIRT EMU (25 kV).
Canada
FLIRT3	OC Transpo	7	2021	4	C10 – C16	DEMUs for use on O-Train Line 2.
Czech Republic
480	LEO Express	5		5	408 001 – 408 005	3 kV DC EMU used on Prague–Ostrava–Žilina–Košice.
Estonia
	Elron	12	2012–2014	3		FLIRT EMU (3 kV, 1520 mm gauge)
	Elron	6	2012–2014	4		FLIRT EMU (3 kV, 1520 mm gauge)
	Elron	6	2012–2014	2		FLIRT DEMU (1520 mm gauge)
	Elron	8	2012–2014	3		FLIRT DEMU (1520 mm gauge)
	Elron	6	2012–2014	4		FLIRT DEMU (1520 mm gauge)
Finland
Sm5	VR	81	2008–2017	4	01 – 81	FLIRT EMU (25 kV AC), 1524 mm gauge. Owned by Pääkaupunkiseudun Junakalusto Oy, leased to the Helsinki Regional Transport Authority (HSL), operated by VR for the Helsinki commuter rail network.
Sm7	VR	20	2025–	4		FLIRT EMU (25 kV AC), 1524 mm gauge.
Germany
BR 429.0	DB Regio AG	5		5	429 026 – 429 030	FLIRT EMU (15 kV).
BR 429.1	DB Regio AG	28		5	429 100 – 429 127	FLIRT3 EMU operated on SÜWEX (Südwest Express) line in Rhineland-Palatinate. These EMU's are coupled with CFL KISS EMU's between Koblenz Hbf and Trier Hbf.
BR 6526	DB Regio AG	44		2	6526 001 – 6526 044	FLIRT Akku BEMU 2-4/8 (without jacobs bogies) operated on Palatinate railway lines in Germany. One side is designated BR 6526 while the other side is designated BR 6826.
BR 3428	DB Regio AG	22		4	3428 017 – 046	FLIRT 3XL EMU (15 kV AC).
BR 427.1	Berchtesgadener Land Bahn	5	2009	3	ET 130 – ET 134	15 kV FLIRT EMU. Leased from Angel Trains, now Alpha Trains.
BR 426.1	Abellio Rail NRW	8		2		FLIRT EMU (15 kV) operated on Ruhr-Sieg-Netz (Essen-Siegen, Essen-Hagen, Hagen-Iserlohn and Hagen-Siegen). Currently operated by DB Regio AG.
BR 427.1	Abellio Rail NRW	9		3		FLIRT EMU (15 kV) operated on Ruhr-Sieg-Netz (Essen-Siegen, Essen-Hagen, Hagen-Iserlohn and Hagen-Siegen). Currently operated by DB Regio AG.
BR 3427	Abellio Rail NRW	17		3	3427 001 – 3427 017	FLIRT 3XL EMU operated on S-Bahn Rhein-Ruhr. Currently operated by DB Regio AG.
BR 3429	Abellio Rail NRW	24		5	3429 001 – 3429 024	FLIRT 3XL EMU operated on S-Bahn Rhein-Ruhr. Currently operated by DB Regio AG.
BR 1429	Abellio Rail NRW	14		5	ET 25 2201 – ET 25 2214	15 kV FLIRT3 EMU operated in North Rhine-Westphalia. Currently operated by VIAS Rail.
BR 2429	Abellio Rail NRW	7		5	ET 25 2301 – ET 25 2307	Multi-system FLIRT3 EMU (1.5+15+25 kV) equipped for services to the Netherlands (Düsseldorf Hbf – Arnhem Centraal). Currently operated by VIAS Rail in North Rhine-Westphalia.
BR 1427	Go-Ahead, now Arverio	13		3	ET 3	FLIRT 3 EMU operated in Baden-Württemberg.
BR 1428	Go-Ahead, now Arverio	9		4	ET 4	FLIRT 3 EMU operated in Baden-Württemberg.
BR 1429	Go-Ahead, now Arverio	19		5	ET 5	FLIRT 3 EMU operated in Baden-Württemberg.
BR 1430	Go-Ahead, now Arverio	14		6	ET 6	FLIRT 3 EMU operated in Baden-Württemberg.
BR 3427	Go-Ahead, now Arverio	11		3	ET 9.01 – ET 9.11	FLIRT 3XL EMU operated in Baden-Württemberg, Murrbahn.
BR 2429	Eurobahn	8	2017	5	ET 4.01 – ET 4.08	Multi-system FLIRT3 EMU (1.5+15+25 kV) equipped for services to the Netherlands (Hengelo – Bielefeld Hbf). Leased from Alpha Trains.
BR 1429	Eurobahn	5	2018	5	ET 4.21 – ET 4.25	15 kV FLIRT3 EMU, leased from Alpha Trains.
BR 428	Eurobahn	25	2008	4	ET 5.01 – ET 5.25	15 kV FLIRT EMU. Leased from Angel Trains, now Alpha Trains.
BR 428	Eurobahn	4	2010	4	ET 6.01 – ET 6.04	15 kV FLIRT EMU. Used on RE13 route to the Netherlands (Venlo – Hamm (Westf)). Leased from Alpha Trains.
BR 429.0	Eurobahn	14	2010	5	ET 7.01 – ET 7.14	15 kV FLIRT EMU. Used on RE13 route to the Netherlands (Venlo – Hamm (Westf)). Leased from Alpha Trains.
BR 427	Eurobahn	14		3	ET 8.01 – ET 8.14	15 kV FLIRT EMU.
BR 429.0	Eurobahn	5		5	ET 9.01 – ET 9.05	15 kV FLIRT EMU.
BR 3428	Transdev	16	2022	4	3428 001 - 016	FLIRT 3XL EMU (15 kV AC) operated in Regio S-Bahn Bremen under "NordWestBahn". The order was placed on 13 June 2019. Leased from Alpha Trains.
BR 3428	VIAS	8	2025	4	3428 036 - 043	FLIRT 3XL EMU (15 kV AC) operated in "Rheingau Express". The order was placed on . Leased from Alpha Trains.
Hungary
415	MÁV	60	2007–2010	4	415 001 - 060	FLIRT EMU (25 kV AC).
415	GYSEV	4	2012	4	415 500 - 503	
415	MÁV	42	2013	4	415 061 - 102	
415		6	2013	4	415 103 - 108	
415	GYSEV	6	2013	4	415 504 - 509	
415	MÁV	15	2015	4	415 109 - 123	
435	GYSEV	10	2016	4	435 501 - 510	FLIRT3 EMU (25 kV AC).
445	GYSEV	11	2026	5	445 000 - 011	FLIRT EMU (15 kV+25 kV).
Ireland
	Iarnród Éireann; NI Railways	8	2028–			Tri-mode (1.5 kV + battery + diesel, 1600 mm gauge)
Italy
ETR 350	Ferrovie Emilia Romagna	12		5		FLIRT EMU (3 kV)
BTR 813	Valle d'Aosta	5	2016	3		Bimodal FLIRT3 EMU (3kV + diesel)
Netherlands
FLIRT-II	Abellio	6	2015–2016	2	2010–2015	FLIRT3 EMU (1.5 kV) operated on route Gouda – Alphen aan den Rijn.
FLIRT-III	NS Reizigers	33	2015–2017	3	2201–2233	FLIRT3 EMU (1.5 kV) operated on Hoofdrailnet (South Eastern parts of the Netherlands). Nicknamed "FFF"—"Flirt Fast Forward".
FLIRT-IV	NS Reizigers	25	2015–2017	4	2501–2525	FLIRT3 EMU (1.5 kV) operated on Hoofdrailnet (South Eastern parts of the Netherlands). Nicknamed "FFF"—"Flirt Fast Forward".
FLIRT-III	Keolis Nederland	9	2017	3	7301–7309	FLIRT3 EMU (1.5 kV) operated on regional services Zwolle–Enschede and Zwolle–Kampen
FLIRT-IV	Keolis Nederland	7	2017	4	7401–7407	FLIRT3 EMU (1.5 kV) operated on regional services Zwolle–Enschede and Zwolle–Kampen
FLIRT-III	Keolis Nederland(RRReis)	2	2017	3	5038–5039	FLIRT3 EMU (1.5 kV). Former Connexxion units for use on the Valleilijn between Ede-Wageningen and Amersfoort.
FLIRT-II	Arriva Nederland	15	2016	2	450–464	FLIRT3 EMU (1.5 kV) operated on regional services in Limburg.
FLIRT-III	Arriva Nederland	13	2023	3	560–572	FLIRT3 EMU (1.5 kV) operated on regional services in Limburg.
FLIRT-IIImc	Arriva Nederland	8	2017–2018	3	550–557	Multi-system FLIRT3 EMU suitable for Belgium (3 kV), the Netherlands (1.5 kV) and Germany (15 kV). These units were refitted with ECTS between 2021 and 2023 for operations in Belgium in order to operate a service between Aachen – Heerlen – Maastricht – Liège.
FLIRT-III	Arriva Nederland	5	2026-2027	4	(unknown)	To be operated on Almelo - Hardenberg route after electrification.
Flirt Flex	NS Reizigers	18	2026-2030	4	(unknown)	Project name "S5G" (Sprinter 5th Generation).
Flirt Flex	NS Reizigers	18	2026-2030	6	(unknown)	Project name "S5G" (Sprinter 5th Generation).
Norway
74	Vy	53	2010–2022	5		FLIRT Nordic EMU (15 kV) operated on regional services (Eastern parts of Norway).
75	Vy	63	2012–2020	5		FLIRT Nordic EMU (15 kV) operated on Oslo Commuter Rail
75–2	Vy Gjøvikbanen; Vy Tog	20	2017–2019	5		FLIRT Nordic EMU (15 kV) operated on Gjøvik Line, Bergen Commuter Rail
76	SJ Norge	14	2020–2021	5		FLIRT NT BMU (diesel/battery/15 kV) used on Trøndelag/Trondheim Commuter Rail, Røros Line.
	Norske tog AS	8		8		FLIRT Nordic Express. Type A: EMU (15 kV+25 kV) with day and night configuration.
	Norske tog AS	4		7		FLIRT Nordic Express. Type B: BMU (15 kV+25 kV+diesel) with day and night configuration. Car 'A' is a dedicated 'powerhead' for traction.
	Norske tog AS	3		8		FLIRT Nordic Express. Type C: EMU (15 kV+25 kV) with day configuration.
	Norske tog AS	2		8		FLIRT Nordic Express. Type D: EMU (15 kV+25 kV) with day configuration and a cargo car.
Poland
EN 75	Silesian Railways	4	2008	4		FLIRT EMU (3 kV) for regional services in Silesia.
ER 75	Masovian Railways	10	2008	4		FLIRT EMU (3 kV) for regional services in Mazovia.
LM-4268	Łódź Agglomeration Railway	20	2014–2015	3		FLIRT^{3} EMU operated on regional services in Łódź metropolitan area. Initially 2 cars per set, later extended to 3 cars.
ED 160	PKP Intercity	20	2015	8		FLIRT3 EMU (3 kV). Used for routes connecting major cities.
ED 160	PKP Intercity	12	2022–2023	8		FLIRT3 EMU (3 kV). Used for routes connecting major cities.
ER 160	Masovian Railways	61	2020–2023	5		FLIRT3 EMU operated on regional services in Mazovia.
	Masovian Railways	75	2025-	5		FLIRT3 EMU operated on regional services in Mazovia.
Serbia
ŽS 413/417	Srbijavoz	21	2014-2015	4	413‑001/002 - 413 041/042	FLIRT3 EMU (25 kV AC).
ŽS 413/417	Srbijavoz	18	2022-2023	4	413‑101/102 - 413‑135/136	FLIRT EMU (25 kV AC) with traction equipment from Ingeteam.
Spain
	Adif	3			162‑010 – 162‑012	FLIRT EDMU (3 kV + 25 kV) used for testing and measurements; two are built for 1668 mm gauge (010 and 012) and one for 1435 mm gauge (011). Nicknamed "Doctor Green".
	FGC	4		3		FLIRT EMU (3 kV) operated in Lleida.
T100	Renfe	24		4		FLIRT HC EMU (3 kV).
T200	Renfe	55		8		FLIRT HC EMU (3 kV).
Sweden
	MTR Express	6	2013	5		FLIRT Nordic EMU (15 kV AC) operated on Gothenburg–Stockholm.
Switzerland
RABe 523.0	SBB CFF FFS	43	2004–2005	4	523 001 – 523 043	FLIRT EMU used in the Stadtbahn Zug and in the RER Vaud as RABe 523.
RABe 521.0	SBB CFF FFS	30	2004–2006	4	521 001 – 521 030	FLIRT EMU (15 kV) operated in the Regio S-Bahn Basel as RABe 521 they also have a permit for Germany.
RABe 521.2 (RABe 526.6)	SBB CFF FFS	9		4	521 201 – 521 209	15 kV FLIRT EMU. Originally numbered RABe 526 651 – 526 659.
RABe 524.0	SBB CFF FFS	19	2007–2008	4	524 001 – 524 019	Multi-system FLIRT EMU (3+15 kV). First set of regional trains for the TILO network in Ticino and the Lombardia-Region (Italy), used as RABe 524 and also holds a permit for Italy.
RABe 527.3	TransN	3	2007–2009	4	527 331 – 527 333	Used as regional trains and RegioExpress.
RABe 526.0	SOB	23	2007–2013	4	526 041 – 526 063	FLIRT EMU (15 kV AC). Used on Lucerne S-Bahn line S31, St. Gallen S-Bahn lines S4 and S6, Zurich S-Bahn lines S13 and S40, and as extension set to "Traverso" (FLIRT-III) sets on the InterRegio Voralpen Express during peak hours.
RABe 524.1	SBB CFF FFS	17	2010–2014	6	524 101 – 524 117	Multi-system FLIRT EMU (3+15 kV). Second set of regional trains for the TILO network in Ticino and the Lombardia Region (Italy), used as RABe 524.1 and also holds a permit for Italy. As an improvement over the previous iteration, it now has 6 cars instead of 4 and a second onboard toilet.
RABe 527.1	TPF	8	2011–2014	4	527 191 – 527 198	FLIRT EMU (15 kV) used as RER Fribourg and RegioExpress (Bern-Fribourg/Freiburg-Romont FR-Bulle-Broc-Chocolaterie) as RABe 527.
RABe 524.2	SBB CFF FFS	4	2014	4	524 201 – 524 204	Multi-system FLIRT EMU (3+15 kV). Third set of regional trains for the TILO network in Ticino and the Lombardia Region (Italy), used as RABe 524.2 and also holds a permit for Italy. This model is back to 4 cars, but it has a brand new color theme to be applied to the original RABe 524 as well.
RABe 523.0	TransN	4	2017	4	523 074 – 523 077	FLIRT EMU. Used as regional trains and RegioExpress.
RABe 522.2	SBB CFF FFS	32	2011–2019	4	522 201 – 522 232	FLIRT EMU (15+25 kV AC). Used in multiple regional lines and the Léman Express as RABe 522 they also have a permit for France
RABe 524.3	SBB CFF FFS	14		6	524 301 – 524 305, 524 306 – 524 314	Multi-system FLIRT3 EMU for TILO services.
RABe 526	SOB	6	2019–2021	4	526 001 – 526 006	15 kV FLIRT EMU. Used on St. Gallen S-Bahn lines S4 and S6, Zurich S-Bahn lines S13 and S40, and as extension set to "Traverso" sets on InterRegio ines during peak hours.
RABe 526	SOB	23	2019–2021	8	526 101/201 – 526 117/217	15 kV FLIRT EMU. Also known as "Traverso" used on InterRegio lines over the Gotthard Panoramaroute (Treno Gottardo), between Bern and Chur (Aare-Linth), and between Luzern and St. Gallen (Voralpen Express).
RABe 528	BLS AG	56	2021–2026	6	528 101 – 528 130, 528 201 – 528 228	FLIRT EMU, also known as 'MIKA'. Used on the S-Bahn Bern network and on RegioExpress lines.
United Kingdom
745/0	Greater Anglia	10	2018–2020	12	745001 – 745010	EMU for Intercity services
745/1	Greater Anglia	10	2018–2020	12	745101 – 745110	EMU for Stansted Express services
755/4	Greater Anglia	24	2018–2020	4	755401 – 755424	Bi-mode
755/3	Greater Anglia	14	2018–2020	3	755301 – 755314	Bi-mode
756/0	Transport for Wales	7	2021–2023	3	756001 – 756007	Tri-mode
756/1	Transport for Wales	17	2021–2023	4	756101 – 756117	Tri-mode
231	Transport for Wales	11	2021–2022	4	231001 –231011	DEMU
United States
	Trinity Metro (TEXRail)	8	2015–2018	4	101 – 108	DEMU
	SBCTA (Arrow)	3	2018–2022	2	3401 – 3403	DEMU
	SBCTA (Arrow)	1	2019–2024	2	3501	ZEMU
	DART (Silver Line)	8	2019–2024	4	901 – 908	DEMU
	Metra	8 (Note: Base order. Options include 8 more trainsets, 16 trailer cars with toilets, and 16 trailer cars without toilets.)	2024–	2 (Note: Can be extended with the optional trailers, if needed.)	?	BEMU on order for Rock Island District

== See also ==
- Alstom Aventra
- CAF Civity
- CRRC ZEMU03
- Hitachi AT300
- Siemens Desiro
- TMH Ivolga

== Sources ==
- Official Website Flirt160
- Official Website Flirt200
- Old
- Description of the SBB variants from Bruno Lämmli (in German)
- SOB Rolling Stock
