= Intercity (Deutsche Bahn) =

Locomotive-hauled long-distance passenger rail service in Germany

DB Intercity

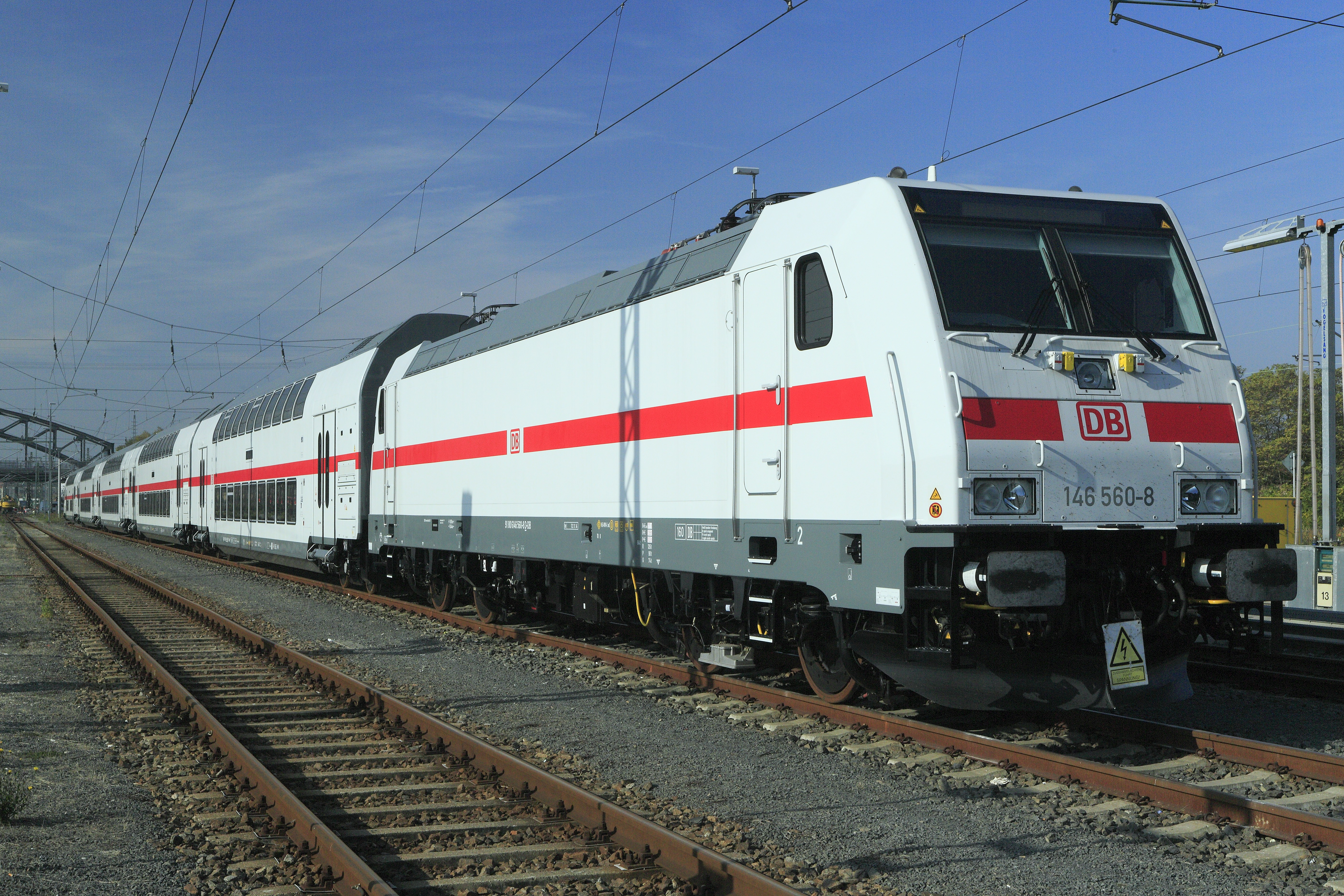
- A current DB Intercity 2 trainset

Overview
- Locale: Germany
- Dates of operation: 1971–present
- Predecessor: F-Zug

Technical
- Track gauge: 1,435 mm (4 ft 8 1/2 in) standard gauge

Other
- Website: bahn.com

Intercity, often shortened to IC ([iːˈtseː]), is the second-highest train classification in Germany, after the Intercity Express (ICE). Intercity services are locomotive-hauled express trains, usually over long-distances. There are Intercity routes throughout Germany and routes generally operate every other hour, with multiple routes giving a more frequent service on core routes. Intercity services are operated by the DB Fernverkehr division of Deutsche Bahn, Germany’s national railway.

The Intercity name was introduced in Germany in 1971, replacing the F-Zug category, and was the top category of train in Germany until the introduction of the high-speed ICE services in the early 1990s. With the proliferation of ICE services, the role of IC trains has diminished slightly. Nonetheless, Intercity trains still offer a high standard of average speed and comfort; all routes offer first class coaches, and most include some sort of catering, though all buffet cars and restaurant cars were retired in 2023. In October 2026, the last of the original IC rolling stock (Intercity 1) were replaced with newer Intercity 2 rolling stock or upgraded to ICE services and trainsets.

A number of German Intercity services serve destinations outside Germany, usually to Austria, Switzerland and the Netherlands with some operating under the EuroCity brand.

== History ==
=== Inception ===
The Intercity logo, in use from 1971 to 1991

The original Intercity network

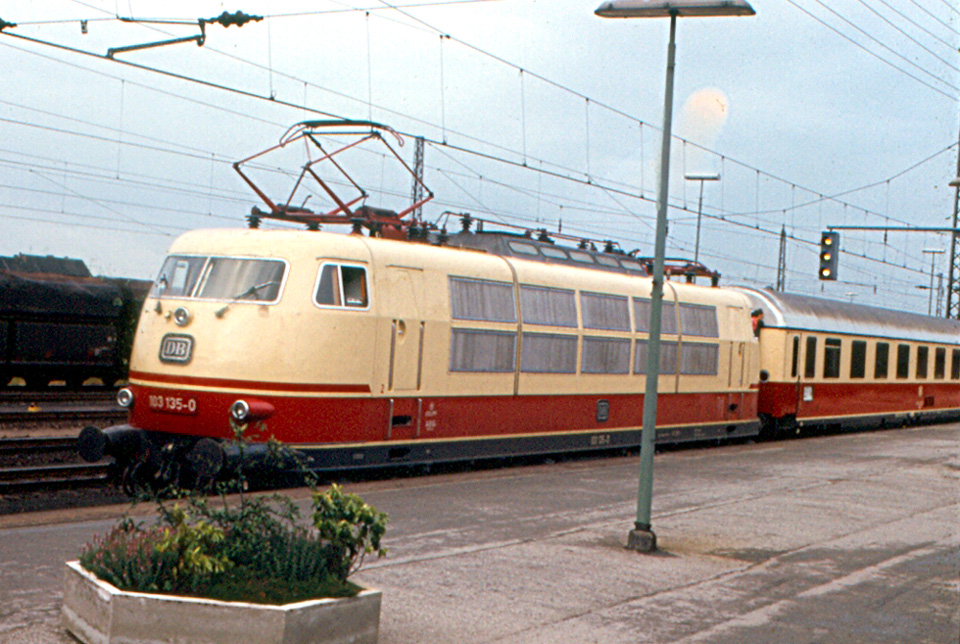
A classic Intercity train at Emmerich in 1973, hauled by a Class 103

The idea for Intercity services on the Deutsche Bundesbahn network was first proposed in 1967, inspired by the success of British Rail's InterCity brand. After some planning, the proposal was approved in 1969, and the services were finally introduced in September 1971, after some delays in delivery of new coaching stock. The original network consisted of four lines, operating every two hours, and connecting the largest cities in West Germany. At this time, Intercity trains were first-class only. The original lines were:

- Line 1 (red): Hamburg-Altona – Bremen – Münster (Westf) – Dortmund – Essen – Duisburg – Düsseldorf – Cologne – Bonn – Koblenz – Mainz – Mannheim – Heidelberg – Stuttgart – Ulm – Augsburg – Munich
- Line 2 (blue): Hannover – Bielefeld – Hamm – Dortmund – Hagen – Wuppertal-Elberfeld (– Solingen-Ohligs) – Cologne – Bonn – Koblenz – Wiesbaden – Frankfurt (Main) – Würzburg – Nuremberg – Augsburg – Munich
- Line 3 (green): Hamburg-Altona – Hannover – Göttingen – Fulda – Frankfurt (Main) – Mannheim – Karlsruhe – Freiburg (Breisgau) – Basel
- Line 4 (gold): Bremen – Hannover – Göttingen – Bebra – Fulda – Würzburg (– Ingolstadt) – Munich

Gradually, the Intercity network started to expand, and with the introduction of the Class 103 locomotives, 200 km/h running was possible. Services were increased in frequency to hourly, and second class accommodation was provided – in 1979 this was promoted with the slogan "every hour, every class".

Additionally, there is also another new line 5, running from Dortmund to Munich. It was opened since 2 May 1985.

- Line 1 (red): Hamburg-Altona – Bremen – Osnabrück – Münster (Westf) – Dortmund – Bochum – Essen – Duisburg – Düsseldorf – Köln – Bonn – Koblenz – Wiesbaden – Frankfurt (Main)
- Line 2 (brown): Hannover – Bielefeld – Hamm – Dortmund – Essen – Duisburg – Düsseldorf – Cologne – Bonn – Koblenz – Mainz – Mannheim – Heidelberg – Stuttgart – Ulm – Augsburg – Munich
- Line 3 (green): Hamburg-Altona – Hannover – Göttingen – Fulda – Frankfurt (Main) – Mannheim – Karlsruhe – Freiburg (Breisgau) – Basel (– Switzerland)
- Line 4 (gold): Hamburg-Altona – Hannover – Göttingen – Bebra – Fulda – Würzburg – Augsburg – München
- line 4a (grey): Oldenburg or Bremerhaven – Bremen – Hannover
- Line 5 (blue): Dortmund – Hagen – Wuppertal-Elberfeld (– Solingen-Ohligs) – Cologne – Bonn – Koblenz – Mainz – Frankfurt Airport – Frankfurt (Main) (– Aschaffenburg) – Würzburg – Nuremberg – Augsburg – Munich

The InterCity for 3a is also part of the TransEuropExpress:

- Line 3a: Amsterdam – Utrecht – Oberhausen – Duisburg – Düsseldorf – Köln – Bonn – Koblenz – Mainz – (Mannheim – Karlsruhe – Freiburg (Breisgau) – Basel) or (Mannheim – Heidelberg – Stuttgart – Ulm – Augsburg – Munich – Salzburg) or (Frankfurt Airport – Frankfurt (Main) – Würzburg – Augsburg – Munich – Innsbruck)

Some ICs switched between lines 4 and 5, 2 and 5 (Essen or Wuppertal), or 2 and 3 (Basel or Stuttgart).

=== Reunification and growth ===
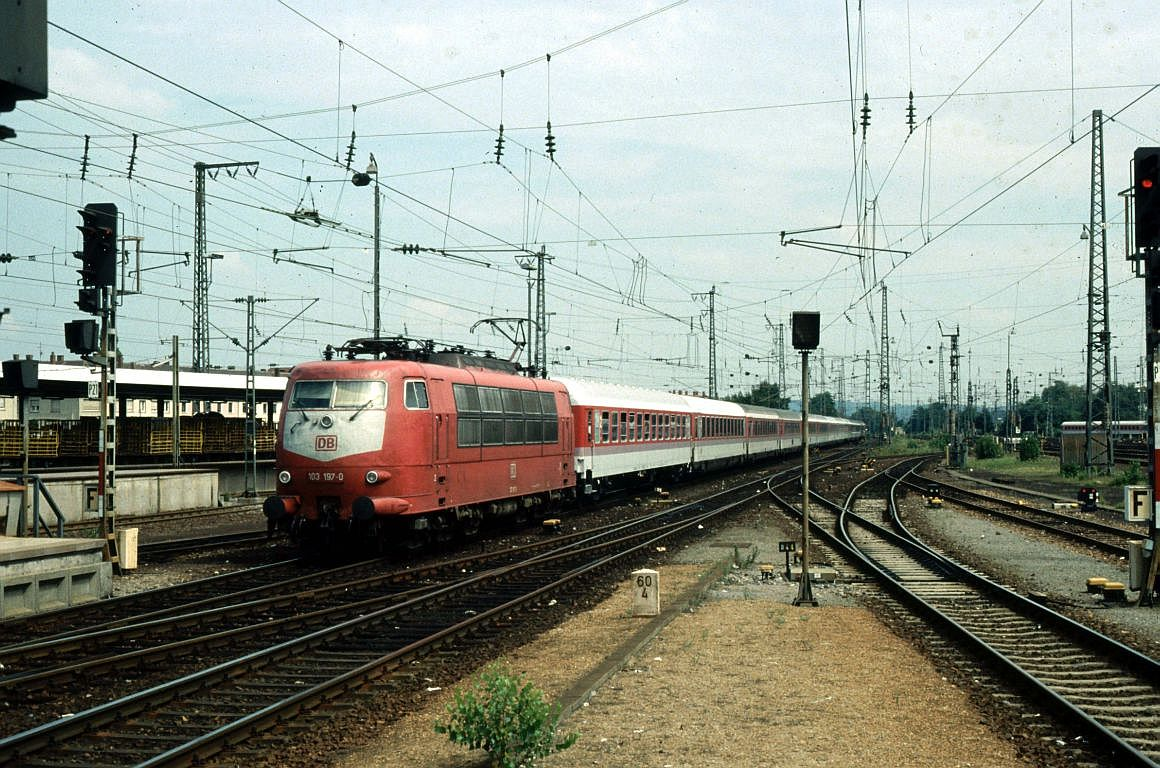
An Intercity train at Karlsruhe in 1995

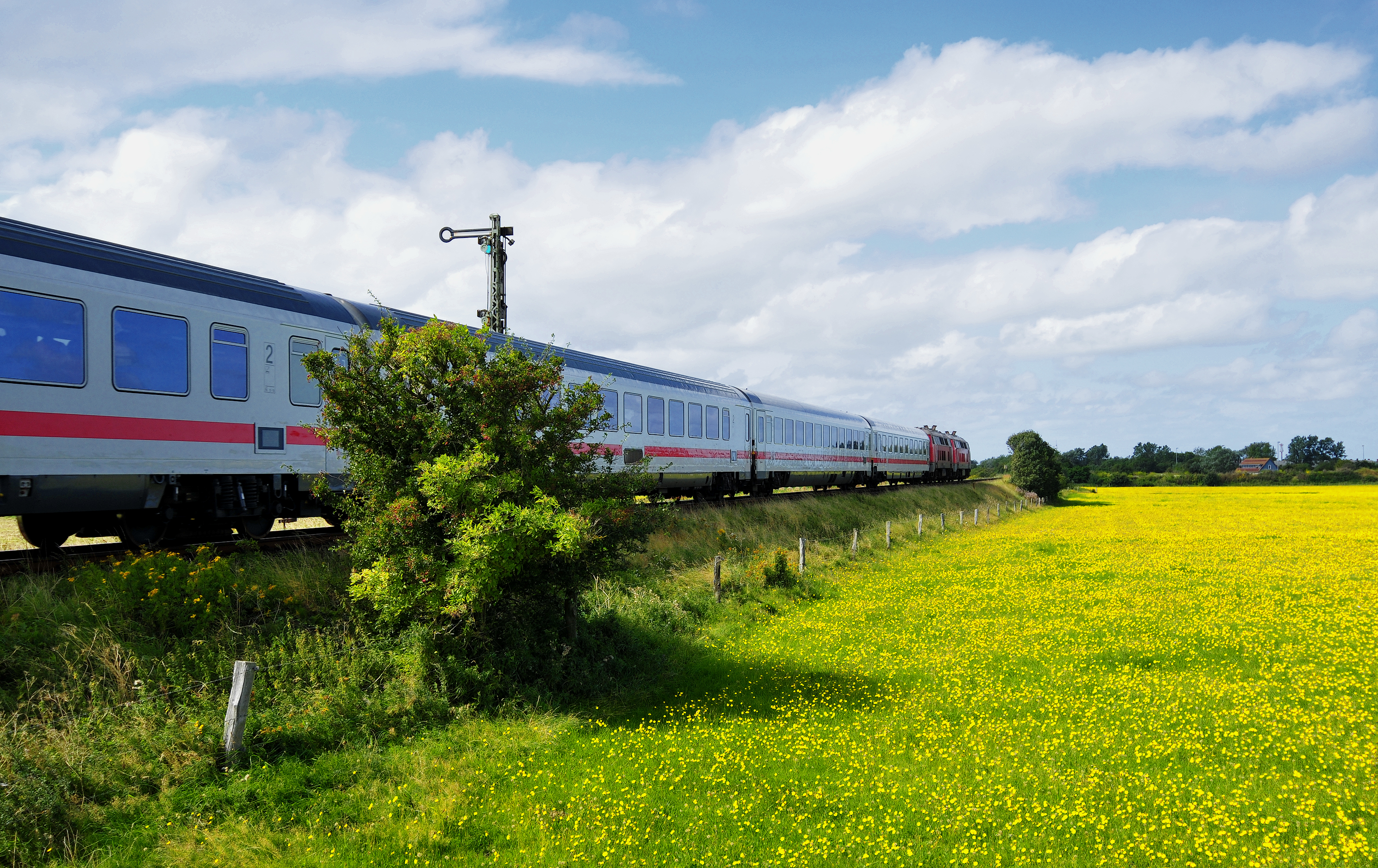
An Intercity train at Sylt in 2012

IC routes in 1992

The network continued to evolve throughout the 1980s, and in the early 1990s it saw major changes. One major driving force for this was German reunification, which saw the network expand across the former East Germany, but also the opening of two high-speed lines in 1991: Mannheim to Stuttgart and Hannover to Würzburg. The first generation ICEs were introduced around this time, and took over most services on the Hannover – Fulda corridor, while the remaining services expanded in all directions.

The routes on 2 June 1991 were as follows:

- IC Line 1 (red): Hamburg-Altona – Bremen – Münster (Westf) – Dortmund – Essen – Duisburg – Düsseldorf – Cologne – Bonn – Koblenz – Mainz – Frankfurt (Main) Flughafen – Frankfurt (Main) – Aschaffenburg – Würzburg – Nürnberg – (Ingolstadt – Munich) or (Regensburg – Passau – Linz – Wien) (connecting to Austria)
- IC Line 1a (magenta): Wiesbaden – Frankfurt (Main) (every two hours)
- IC Line 2 (brown): (Dortmund – Bochum) or (Münster (Westf) – Recklinghausen – Gelsenkirchen) – Essen – Duisburg – Düsseldorf – Köln – Bonn – Koblenz – Mainz – Mannheim – Heidelberg – Stuttgart – Ulm – Augsburg – Munich (eight EC train pairs via Salzburg to Budapest, Klagenfurt, Wien or Zagreb)
- IC Line 2a (magenta): Wiesbaden – Mainz
- IC Line 3 (green): Berlin – Potsdam – Magdeburg – Helmstedt – Braunschweig – Hildesheim – Göttingen – Kassel-Wilhelmshöhe – Fulda – Frankfurt (Main) – Mannheim – Karlsruhe (every two hours, one EC train pair via Basel to Zürich)
- IC Line 4 (gold): Hamburg-Altona – Hannover – Göttingen – Kassel-Wilhelmshöhe – Fulda – Würzburg – Augsburg – Munich (every two hours to Nuremberg)
- IC Line 5 (blue): (every two hours: Berlin – Potsdam – Magdeburg –) Braunschweig – Hannover– Bielefeld – Hamm – Dortmund – Hagen – Wuppertal – Solingen-Ohligs – Cologne – Bonn – Koblenz – Mainz – Mannheim – Karlsruhe – Freiburg (Breisgau) – Basel (new EC pairs of trains to Brig, Chur, Geneva, Interlaken, Milan or Sestri Levante)
- EC Line 5a (lilac): Amsterdam – Utrecht – Emmerich – Oberhausen – Duisburg – Düsseldorf – Cologne (every two hours, two EC train pairs on Line 5 to Chur and Interlaken)
- ICE Line 6 (orange): Hamburg-Altona – Hannover – Göttingen – Kassel-Wilhelmshöhe – Fulda – Frankfurt (Main) – Mannheim – Stuttgart – Ulm – Augsburg – Munich
- IC Line 6a (grey): Oldenburg or Bremerhaven – Bremen – Hannover

Meanwhile, a new type of express train – the InterRegio – was created in the late-1980s, replacing the old D-Zug services, providing semi-fast services to complement Intercity trains.

The new changes on 31 May 1992 were as follows:

- IC Line 1 (red): from Nuremberg to Munich
- IC Line 3 (green): Hamburg-Altona – Hannover – Göttingen – Kassel-Wilhelmshöhe – Fulda – Frankfurt – Mannheim – Karlsruhe (– Basel – Zürich)
- ICE Line 4 (yellow): either Bremen or Hamburg-Altona, to Nuremberg
- IC Line 6a (grey): every two hours Bremen – Hannover
- IC Line 8 (lime): Berlin – Flughafen Berlin-Schönefeld – Leipzig – Naumburg – Jena – Saalfeld – Probstzella – Lichtenfels – Bamberg – Erlangen – Nuremberg – Ingolstadt – Munich (every two hours)

From 1996, IC line 8 was connected from Berlin to Hamburg, which together with IC line 7 between the two cities, which ran until 1998, created an hourly service. IC line 5 ran from 1997 via Hanover Magdeburg and Leipzig to Dresden instead of Berlin. as a result, the new ICE line 10 was established from Berlin to Cologne/Bonn. At the same time, the branch to Basel, which was previously served by IC line 5, was abandoned. The line now ended in Nuremberg. From 1998 the trains of ICE line 6 and ICE line 10 ran over the new Berlin–Hanover line.

=== Modern era ===
The next major change to Intercity services came about in 2002, with the opening of the Cologne–Frankfurt high-speed rail line largely to replace the West Rhine Railway, a major trunk route for Intercity services. While previous high speed lines in Germany had been designed for mixed usage, and could be used by Intercity trains, this line can only be operated by new ICE 3 units. This, along with the introduction of another generation of ICEs, the ICE T, saw large numbers of Intercity routes converted to ICE. Meanwhile, the InterRegio classification was abolished, and many of its services converted into Intercity routes.

As a result, the character of Intercity has changed. Having been on an almost equal footing with the ICE, it is very much secondary. While it still provides a high quality of service, trains now stop more frequently, and are more commonly found on lesser routes. Most current IC trains convey fewer first-class coaches, more open seating as opposed to compartments, and a Bistro Cafe (buffet car) instead of a restaurant or no on-board catering at all, although this is as much a reflection of the changing habits of modern passengers than it is a change in the status of Intercity trains. Until 2023, Lines 30 and 31 – Hamburg to Frankfurt/Stuttgart – were closest in character to a 'classic' Intercity train, but these have now been abolished, with sections of these services reallocated to lines such as 55.

== Current services ==
Deutsche Bahn's long distance services are operated over numbered routes. If they are operated by Intercity-Express rolling stock they are considered to be Intercity-Express lines. Lines operated by Intercity rolling stock or a mixture of Intercity and Intercity-Express sets are listed below (as of 2022).

=== Line 17 ===
IC line 17 was established on 15 December 2019. This is a service that has been served every two hours since 9 March 2020. Between Rostock and Berlin, IC line 17 is the successor to Interregio line 14, which operated here until 2002. Some former IC services on line 28 were replaced here by line 17. On the section between Berlin and Dresden, the line supplements the heavily used Eurocity line RJ 27 to Prague and has connected Berlin Brandenburg Airport (BER) since it opened. Two trains a day continue from Dresden on to Chemnitz.

Line	Route
IC 17	Chemnitz – Freiberg – Dresden – Dresden-Neustadt – Elsterwerda – BER Airport – Berlin Südkreuz – Berlin – Berlin Gesundbrunnen – Oranienburg – Neustrelitz – Waren – Rostock

=== Line 35 ===
Trains run every two hours between Emden and Cologne. Some trains start at Norddeich Mole or Emden Außenhafen. Emden Außenhafen is only served from March to October. A pair of trains runs daily from Koblenz (on weekends from Cologne) to Bremerhaven-Lehe or from Bremerhaven-Lehe to Cologne. All IC trains running between Leer and Norddeich Mole can be used with regional tickets.

Line	Route	Stock
IC 35	(Norddeich Mole – Norddeich – Norden –) or (Emden Außenhafen –) Emden – Leer – Papenburg – Meppen – Lingen – Rheine – Münster – Recklinghausen – Wanne-Eickel – Gelsenkirchen – Oberhausen – Duisburg – Düsseldorf Airport – Düsseldorf – Cologne	IC2

=== Line 37 ===
Since the 2018 annual timetable, a daily pair of trains has again been running between Düsseldorf and Luxembourg. Until December 2014, this section was part of line 35. (Stadler KISS) double-deck multiple units of the CFL are used. On the Koblenz–Trier railway, the train runs as an RE, between Koblenz and Düsseldorf as an IC on behalf of DB Fernverkehr with the option of reserving seats and taking bicycles.

Line	Route
IC 37	Düsseldorf – Cologne – Bonn – Remagen – Andernach – Koblenz – Kobern-Gondorf – Treis-Karden – Cochem – Bullay – Wittlich – Schweich – Trier – Wasserbillig – Luxemburg

=== Line 55 ===
Line 55 runs every two hours from Dresden via Leipzig, Magdeburg, Hanover, Dortmund, Hagen and Wuppertal to Cologne. With the annual timetable change in December 2022, the line was extended to Stuttgart as a replacement for line 30. Since December 2023, one train pair has continued to/from Tübingen, replacing a train pair on line 32. Some trains are now operated as ICE 55.

Line	Route	Stock
IC 55	Dresden – Dresden-Neustadt – Riesa – Leipzig – Leipzig/Halle Airport – Halle – Köthen – Magdeburg – Helmstedt – Braunschweig – Hanover – Minden – Bad Oeynhausen – Herford – Bielefeld – Gütersloh – Hamm – Dortmund – Hagen – Wuppertal – Solingen – Cologne – Bonn – Koblenz – Mainz – Mannheim – Heidelberg – Vaihingen (Enz) – Stuttgart – Nürtingen – Metzingen – Reutlingen – Tübingen	IC2

One train pair (IC 2012/IC 2013 Allgäu), formerly operated as part of line 32, connects North Dortmund with Oberstdorf in the Allgäu region. The stops at Plochingen and Göppingen are only served when traveling towards Oberstdorf.

Route	Stock
Dortmund – Bochum – Essen – Duisburg – Düsseldorf – Cologne – Bonn – Koblenz – Mainz – Mannheim – Heidelberg – Vaihingen – Stuttgart – Plochingen – Göppingen – Ulm – Memmingen – Kempten – Immenstadt Sonthofen – Fischen – Oberstdorf	Class 101/class 218 + IC 1 coaches

=== Line 56 ===
Line 56 starts in Norddeich Mole and runs every two hours via Braunschweig to Leipzig. A few trains use an alternative route from Emden Außenhafen station. Peine is served by two trains in the direction of Leipzig and one in the direction of Emden. One pair of trains runs from Magdeburg via Potsdam and Berlin to Cottbus; it is the only long-distance service to stop at some stations. The other trains run via Köthen and Halle to Leipzig. Intercity 2 sets have been in service since December 2015.

Between Norddeich Mole and Bremen, the trains run one hour later than the Lower Saxony RE 1 services; on this section they can be used with regional transport tickets. This also applies to the free of charge ride for severely disabled people.

Line	Route	
IC 56	Norddeich Mole – Norddeich – Norden – Marienhafe – / Emden Außenhafen – Emden – Leer – Augustfehn – Westerstede-Ocholt – Bad Zwischenahn – Oldenburg – Hude – Delmenhorst – Bremen – Verden – Nienburg – Hannover – Peine – Braunschweig – Helmstedt – Magdeburg –	– Halle – Leipzig
IC 56	Norddeich Mole – Norddeich – Norden – Marienhafe – / Emden Außenhafen – Emden – Leer – Augustfehn – Westerstede-Ocholt – Bad Zwischenahn – Oldenburg – Hude – Delmenhorst – Bremen – Verden – Nienburg – Hannover – Peine – Braunschweig – Helmstedt – Magdeburg –	– Brandenburg – Potsdam – Berlin-Wannsee – Berlin – Berlin Ost – Königs Wusterhausen – Lübben – Lübbenau – Cottbus

=== Line 57 ===
Three pairs of trains are used daily on line 57. The IC 2230/2233 train pair connects Magdeburg with Hamburg. There is also the IC 2234/2235 train pair, which connects Leipzig with Rostock via Magdeburg and Schwerin, and the IC 2238/2239 train pair, which also connects Leipzig with Rostock via Magdeburg and Schwerin, but runs beyond Rostock to Warnemünde

Line	Route	
IC 57	(Leipzig – Halle – Köthen –) Magdeburg – Stendal –	– Salzwedel – Uelzen – Lüneburg – Hamburg-Harburg – Hamburg – Hamburg-Altona
IC 57	(Leipzig – Halle – Köthen –) Magdeburg – Stendal –	Wittenberge – Ludwigslust – Schwerin – Bad Kleinen – Bützow – Rostock (– Warnemünde)

=== Line 61 ===
Line 61 runs every two hours between Karlsruhe and Nuremberg. As of December 2025, two trains pairs per day continue to/from Leipzig. Schorndorf is only served by two trains in the morning towards Nuremberg and by two trains in the evening towards Stuttgart. Since the line runs via Pforzheim, it only uses part of the Mannheim–Stuttgart high-speed railway. Since December 2018, the line has been gradually converted to operation with Intercity 2 sets.

Line	Route
IC 61	Karlsruhe – Pforzheim – Mühlacker – Vaihingen – Stuttgart – Schorndorf – Schwäbisch Gmünd – Aalen – Ellwangen – Crailsheim – Ansbach – Nuremberg (– Erlangen – Bamberg – Lichtenfels – Kronach – Saalfeld – Jena-Göschwitz – Jena Paradies – Naumburg – Weißenfels – Leipzig)

=== Line 76 ===
Trains run every two hours between Flensburg and Fredericia. Danish IC3 diesel multiple units (DSB class MF) are used, which are equipped with PZB and are therefore approved for the German network. The service is operated by the DSB.

Line	Route	Stock
IC 76	Flensburg – Padborg – Tinglev – Rødekro – Vojens – Vamdrup – Lunderskov – Kolding – Fredericia	DSB Class MF

=== Line 87 ===
Until 2010, this line (known as the Gäubahn in Germany) was run as ICE 87, but as there was a shortage of ICE T sets available due to several problems, locomotive-hauled Intercity trains were subsequently used. To continue to Zurich, it was sometimes necessary to change trains in Singen to a Swiss Federal Railways (SBB) service.

As of 2025, an hourly service is offered between Stuttgart and Zurich. Since the installation of ETCS equipment on the Swiss network was completed, Intercity 2 trainsets run from Stuttgart to Zurich. Two pairs of trains continue from Singen to Konstanz from Monday to Friday. Local transport tickets are also valid from Stuttgart to Singen/Konstanz. A few trains have been extended to Frankfurt.

Line	Route
IC 87	(Frankfurt – Heidelberg –) Stuttgart – Böblingen – Horb – Rottweil – Tuttlingen – Singen – Schaffhausen – Zurich
IC 87	Stuttgart – Böblingen – Herrenberg – Gäufelden – Bondorf – Horb – Sulz – Oberndorf – Rottweil – Spaichingen – Tuttlingen – Engen – Singen – Radolfzell – Konstanz

=== Line 89 ===
Line 89 runs every two hours from Munich to Verona. There are also two pairs of trains in the morning hours to Bologna.

Line	Route
EC 89	Munich – Munich East – Rosenheim – Kufstein – Wörgl – Jenbach – Innsbruck – Brenner – Franzensfeste – Brixen – Bolzano – Trento – Rovereto – Verona – Bologna

=== Line 95 ===
Four pairs of trains run daily between Berlin and Warsaw. These are called the Berlin-Warszawa-Express and are operated by DB Fernverkehr and Polskie Koleje Państwowe. They differ visually from the typical IC cars. In addition, a pair of trains runs via Gdańsk to Gdynia and a pair of trains to Kraków.

Line		Route
EC 95	Berlin-Warszawa-Express (PKP: EIC )	Berlin – Berlin Ost – Frankfurt – Rzepin – Świebodzin – Zbąszynek – Poznań – Konin – Kutno – Warsaw West – Warsaw Central – Warsaw East
EC 95	Gedania (PKP: IC )	Berlin – Berlin Ost – Frankfurt – Rzepin – Świebodzin – Zbąszynek – Poznań – Gniezno – Inowrocław – Bydgoszcz – Tczew – Gdańsk (Główny) – Gdańsk (Wrzeszcz) – Gdańsk (Oliwa) – Sopot – Gdynia
EC 95	Wawel (PKP: IC )	Berlin – Berlin Ost – Frankfurt – Rzepin – Zielona Góra – Głogów – Lubin – Legnica – Wrocław – Opole – Gliwice – Zabrze – Katowice – Kraków (Główny) – Kraków (Płaszów) – Bochnia – Tarnów – Dębica – Rzeszów – Łańcut – Przeworsk – Jarosław – Przemyśl

== Named services ==
Originally, all Intercity services had names, usually named after a famous figure from one of the cities along the route. Nowadays, fewer services are named, usually those that serve the extremities of the rail network. Names are usually taken from a geographical location along the route.

Line	Train No.	Route	Name
35	133–134	Norddeich Mole – Emden – Münster – Gelsenkirchen – Düsseldorf – Cologne – Koblenz – Trier – Luxembourg	Ostfriesland
35	2004–2005	Emden – Münster – Gelsenkirchen – Düsseldorf – Cologne – Koblenz – Mainz – Mannheim – Karlsruhe – Offenburg – Konstanz	Bodensee
35	2006–2007	Dortmund – Cologne – Koblenz – Mainz – Mannheim – Karlsruhe – Offenburg – Konstanz	Bodensee
32	2010–2011	Berlin – Hannover – Dortmund – Düsseldorf – Cologne – Koblenz – Mainz – Mannheim – Stuttgart – Tübingen	Loreley
55	2012–2013	Dortmund – Düsseldorf – Cologne – Koblenz – Mainz – Mannheim – Stuttgart – Ulm – Oberstdorf	Allgäu
35	2018–2019	Norddeich Mole – Emden – Münster – Gelsenkirchen – Düsseldorf – Cologne – Koblenz – Mainz – Mannheim – Stuttgart	Nordeney
27	2072–2073	Westerland – Hamburg – Wittenberge – Berlin	Sylter Strand
26	2082–2083	Hamburg – Hannover – Kassel – Würzburg – Ansbach – Augsburg – Munich – Freilassing – Berchtesgaden	Königssee
26	2084–2085	Hamburg – Hannover – Kassel – Würzburg – Ansbach – Augsburg – Oberstdorf	Nebelhorn
26	2170–2171, 2190–2191, 2193	Westerland – Hamburg – Hannover – Kassel – Gießen – Frankfurt	Wattenmeer
26	2184	Hannover – Hamburg – Rostock – Stralsund – Binz	Strelasund
31	2220–2221	Fehmarn – Puttgarden – Lübeck – Hamburg – Bremen – Münster – Dortmund – Cologne – Koblenz – Mainz – Frankfurt	Fehmarn
56	2238–2239	Warnemünde – Rostock – Wittenberge – Stendal – Magdeburg – Halle – Leipzig – Dresden	Warnow
30	2310–2311	Westerland – Hamburg – Bremen – Münster – Dortmund – Cologne – Koblenz – Mainz – Frankfurt – Stuttgart	Nordfriesland
30	2314–2315	Westerland – Hamburg – Bremen – Münster – Dortmund – Cologne – Koblenz – Mainz – Frankfurt	Deichgraf
31	2327	Fehmarn – Puttgarden – Lübeck – Hamburg – Bremen – Münster – Dortmund – Cologne – Koblenz – Mainz – Frankfurt – Würzburg – Nuremberg – Passau	Lübecker Bucht
35	2332, 2336–2337	Emden – Rheine – Münster – Gelsenkirchen – Oberhausen – Düsseldorf – Cologne	Borkum
35	2333	Cologne – Düsseldorf – Oberhausen – Gelsenkirchen – Münster – Rhine – Emden – Norddeich Mole	Nordeney
26	2355–2356	Binz – Stralsund – Rostock – Hamburg – Hannover – Kassel – Gießen – Frankfurt	Arkona
26	2370–2371	Hamburg – Hannover – Kassel – Gießen – Frankfurt – Mannheim – Karlsruhe – Offenburg – Konstanz	Schwarzwald
26	2377	Binz – Stralsund – Rostock – Hamburg – Hannover – Kassel – Gießen – Frankfurt	Strelasund
56	2431	Emden – Oldenburg – Bremen – Hannover – Braunschweig – Magdeburg – Potsdam – Berlin – Cottbus	Borkum
56	2432	Cottbus – Berlin – Potsdam – Magdeburg – Braunschweig – Hannover – Bremen – Oldenburg – Emden – Norddeich Mole	Ostfriesland
56	2434	Leipzig – Halle – Magdeburg – Braunschweig – Hannover – Bremen – Oldenburg – Emden – Norddeich Mole	Borkum
56	2435	Norddeich Mole – Emden – Oldenburg – Bremen – Hannover – Braunschweig – Magdeburg – Halle, Leipzig	Ostfriesland

== Rolling stock ==
=== Motive power ===
The original Intercity services were hauled by the Class 103 electric locomotives, built in the early-1970s and capable of 200 km/h. Lesser routes were operated by Class 110 and 111 locos, but these had a lower maximum speed, and with line speeds increasing, their use became untenable. A new Class 120 was introduced in 1987, and these classes were relegated to Regional duties. In the mid-1990s the Class 101 was introduced, and these locomotives now dominate Intercity services, with the 103s having been largely retired in the early-2000s.

On non-electrified Intercity routes, such as Hamburg to Westerland, or Ulm to Lindau, Class 218 diesel locomotives are used, usually double-headed. For cross-border services, multi-voltage electric locos were needed, such as the Class 181 to France and Luxembourg or the Class 180 into the Czech Republic and Poland.

After German reunification, former Deutsche Reichsbahn locomotives could be found on Intercity services – not only the Class 180s, but the 112 (electric) and 219 (diesel) locos. While the 219s have been retired, the 112s are now solely used on Regional-Expresses due to their top speed of 160 km/h.

In July 2026, most of the remaining scheduled services of the IC1 trainsets were discontinued, as both the IC connections to and from Oberstdorf and Westerland (Sylt) were replaced by ICE L trains as part of the minor timetable change. The last scheduled service with single-deck IC passenger cars was the IC 51 line, Düsseldorf – Gera, which ran for the last time on 20 September 2026. The era of the Intercity 1 finally came to an end with three farewell journeys on 10 October 2026. The farewell was officially celebrated in Wiesbaden under the train numbers IC 1971 (year of introduction), IC 1979 (introduction of second class) and IC 2026 (decommissioning).

While most Intercity trains have been loco-hauled, a small number of services have been operated by multiple units: early services were operated by the VT 11.5 and Class 403 (1973) TEE units, while Nuremberg to Dresden route, was briefly operated by Class 612 DMUs in Intercity livery. This service was later classified as an Interregio-Express (part of DB Regio) and the units were painted in standard DB red. Through service on that route has since been withdrawn altogether with Mitteldeutsche Regio Bahn serving the electrified route from Dresden to Hof and DB Regio serving the route from Hof to Nuremberg.

==== Gallery ====
Current motive power
146.5 (Electric loco)	147.5 (Electric loco)

=== Coaching stock ===
Early Intercity trains used classic Eurofima stock, shared with TEE and D-Zug expresses, but with the growth of the network in the 1980s, and the inclusion of second class, large numbers of new air-conditioned coaches were built, which are still in use to this day. In the mid-1990s driving trailers were introduced on Intercity and Interregio services, which had the effect of speeding up journey times: many major German railway stations are termini, so a lot of Intercity services include at least one change of direction. With the demise of InterRegio in 2002, a large number of IR coaches were incorporated in Intercity services – particularly second class coaches but also the Bistro Café, which had replaced a full restaurant car on most routes.

Between 2012-2014, Deutsche Bahn undertook a refurbishing program named IC mod to renew its remaining Intercity coaches with updated interiors similar to that found in the ICE 3 fleet.

In December 2023, DB retired all remaining bistro and restaurant cars from IC services due to them being prone to technical issues and reaching the end of their lifespan. While mobile catering was introduced on some routes, several InterCitys lost food and beverage services entirely.

In September 2026, DB retired all remaining IC single-deck coaches (dubbed Intercity 1) after 55 years of service with several dedicated farewell services. All remaining IC lines are now served with double-deck coaches and trainsets gradually introduced since 2015.

==== Livery ====
Intercity coaches were originally in the blue and beige colour scheme employed on D-Zug services, with first class coaches in the TEE dark red and beige. A rebranding of the Deutsche Bundesbahn in the mid-1980s saw a new colour scheme for Intercity services, orient red and light grey with a pastel pink stripe in between. When DB adopted traffic red as its corporate colour in the mid-1990s, this replaced orient red, with the pink stripe taken off, before a new livery was introduced in 2000s – based on the Intercity-Express, the coaches are all white with a red stripe.

== Rolling stock replacement ==
Deutsche Bahn planned to replace most Intercity and Eurocity rolling stock with Intercity-Express ICE 4 electric multiple unit trainsets by 2025. ICE 4 is a Deutsche Bahn project to procure up to 300 fourth generation Intercity-Express trains to replace its existing Intercity fleets used on long-distance passenger services in Germany.

In addition to the ICE 4, Deutsche Bahn has awarded Bombardier Transportation a contract to supply double-decker coaches for Intercity services. This kind of coach is used in German Regional-Express trains. The coaches being supplied for Intercity services have a more comfortable interior than those used for regional train double-decker coaches. In both classes only open coaches are provided and there is no dining car. The double-decker coaches have been in service since 2015. Unlike most previous IC stock, the new trains, marketed as "InterCity 2" by DB, have a top speed of 160 km/h and are mainly intended for routes where higher speeds are not possible or would offer little or no benefit. The ICE 4 are taking over routes with maximum speeds between 160 km/h (99 mph) and 250 km/h (160 mph). The InterCity 2 services are also intended to expand the Intercity network to cities that had lost their long-distance service upon withdrawal of Interregio services.

As of September 2026, all classic IC 1 coaches have been retired and replaced by the aforementioned new ICE or IC 2 trainsets.

== See also ==
- EuroCity in Germany
- Intercity-Express
- Trans Europe Express
- InterCity (in other countries)
