= Norddeich =

Norddeich may refer to:

- Norddeich (Dithmarschen), a municipality in the district of Dithmarschen, Schleswig-Holstein, Germany
- Norddeich (Norden), a seaside resort in the district of Norden, East Frisia, Germany
  - Norddeich Mole railway station, Norden
  - Norddeich radio station, Norden
  - Norddeich railway station, Norden
