= Norddeich station (disambiguation) =

Norddeich station may refer to:

- Norddeich station, Norden, Lower Saxony
- Norddeich radio station, Norden, Lower Saxony
- Norddeich Mole station, Norden, Lower Saxony
