= Legnica railway station =

Railway station in Legnica, Poland

Legnica
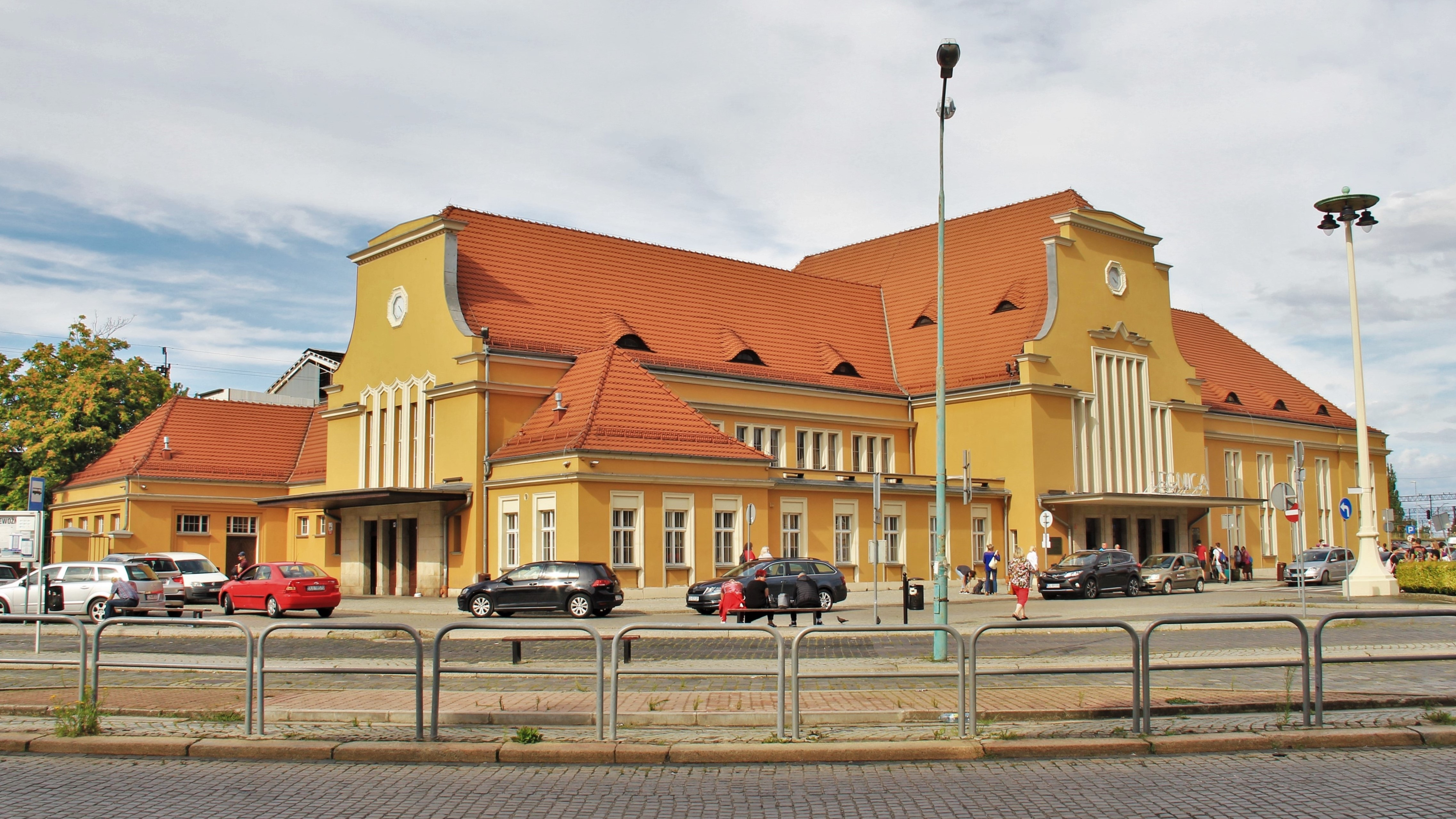
- Legnica railway station

General information
- Location: Legnica, Lower Silesia, Poland
- Coordinates: 51°12′50″N 16°10′09″E
- Line: Miłkowice–Jasień railway
- Platforms: 11

History
- Opened: 1844; 182 years ago
- Electrified: 1984; 42 years ago

Services
Preceding station	PKP Intercity	Following station
Lubin towards Berlin Hbf	EuroCity EC 95; IC	Wrocław Główny towards Przemyśl Główny
Lubin towards Zielona Góra Główna	IC	Wrocław Główny towards Przemyśl Główny
Lubin towards Świnoujście	IC	Wrocław Główny towards Kraków Główny
Środa Śląska towards Warszawa Wschodnia	IC	Chojnów towards Zgorzelec
Lubin towards Świnoujście	TLK	Środa Śląska towards Lublin Główny
Preceding station	KD	Following station
Kunice towards Wrocław Główny	D1	Jezierzany towards Lubań Śląski
Terminus	D5	Legnica Piekary towards Kudowa-Zdrój
Kunice towards Wrocław Główny	D10	Jezierzany towards Dresden Hauptbahnhof
Kunice towards Wrocław Główny	D11	Rzeszotary towards Głogów
Kunice towards Wrocław Główny	D14	Jezierzany towards Forst (Lausitz)
Kunice towards Wrocław Główny	D99	Cottbus Hauptbahnhof towards Berlin-Lichtenberg
Location
- Location within Poland Location within Lower Silesian Voivodeship

Legnica (German: Liegnitz) is a railway station in the town of Legnica, Lower Silesia, Poland.

Current building of the station has been opened for the public in 1927 and represents Art Deco style in architecture. It is one of few stations in Poland which has a large hall of steel-glass.

== Train services ==
Train services are operated by Lower Silesian Railways, Polregio, and PKP Intercity.

Until mid-December 2014 the station was also served by EuroCity "Wawel", which used to run once daily between Berlin Hauptbahnhof and Wrocław Główny. The service has been re-established since 2020, now extending further East to Przemyśl near the Ukrainian border.

The station is served by the following service(s):

- Intercity services (IC) Zielona Góra - Wrocław - Opele - Częstochowa - Kraków - Rzeszów - Przemyśl
- Intercity services (IC) Swinoujscie - Szczecin - Kostrzyn - Rzepin - Zielona Gora - Wroclaw - Katowice - Kraków
- Intercity services (IC) Zgorzelec - Legnica - Wrocław - Ostrów Wielkopolski - Łódź - Warszawa
- Intercity services (TLK) Lublin Główny — Świnoujście
- Regional services (KD) Wrocław - Legnica - Węgliniec - Lubań Śląski
- Regional services (KD) Wrocław - Legnica - Zgorzelec - Görlitz
