= Marienhafe station =

Railway station in Marienhafe, Germany

Marienhafe
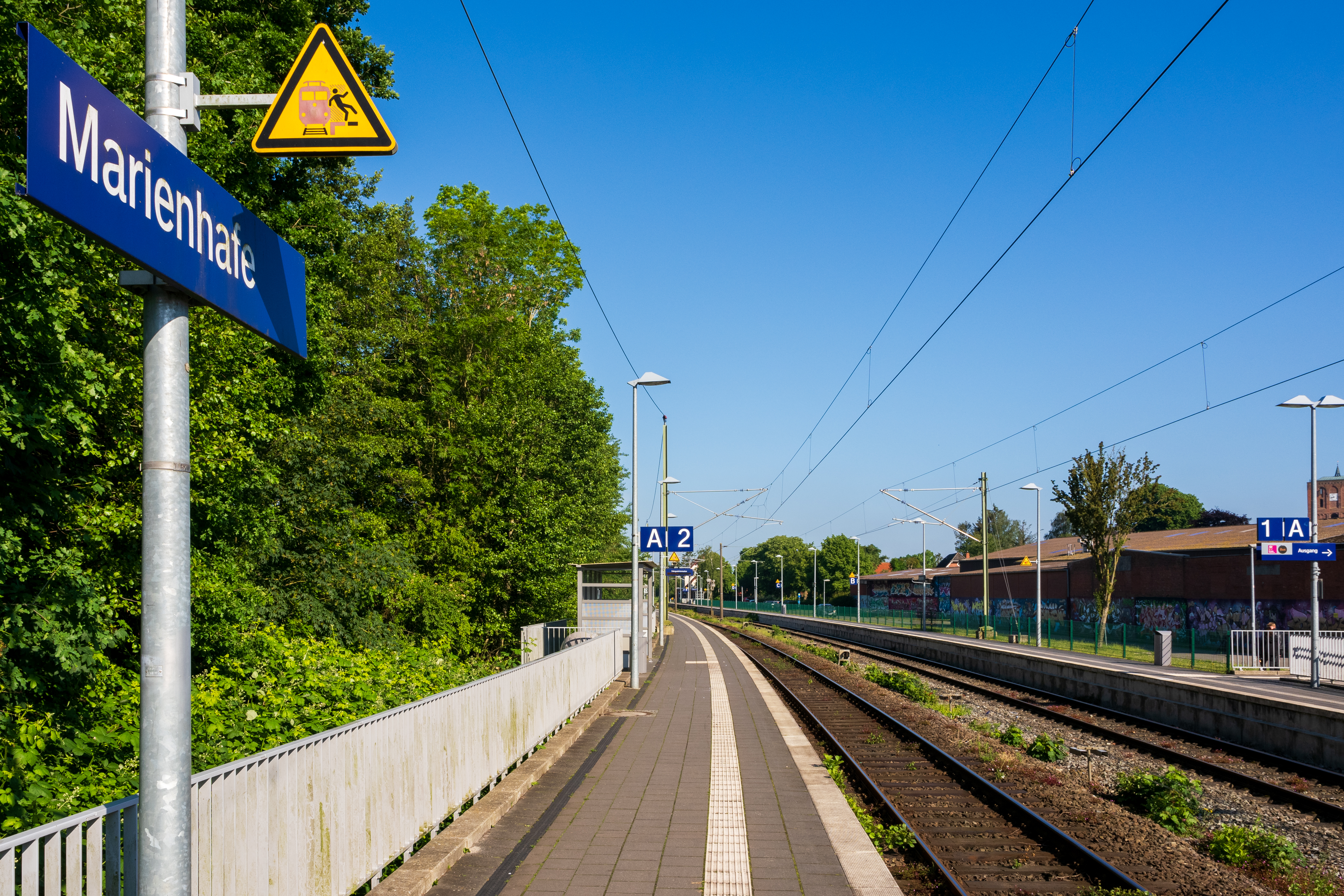
- Marienhafe railway station

General information
- Location: Marienhafe, Lower Saxony; Germany
- Coordinates: 53.520833°N 7.270556°E
- Line: Emsland Railway
- Platforms: 2

Other information
- Website: www.bahnhof.de

Services
Preceding station	DB Fernverkehr	Following station
Norden towards Norddeich Mole	IC 56	Emden Hbf towards Leipzig Hbf
Preceding station	DB Regio Nord	Following station
Norden towards Norddeich Mole	RE 1	Emden Hbf towards Hannover Hbf
Location

Marienhafe (German: Bahnhof Marienhafe) is a railway station located in Marienhafe, Germany. The station is located on the Emsland Railway. The train services are operated by Deutsche Bahn.

== Train services ==
The following services currently call at the station:

Line	Route	Interval	Operator	Rolling stock
IC 56	Norddeich Mole – Norden – Marienhafe – Emden – Bremen – Hanover – Braunschweig – Magdeburg – Leipzig	Three train pairs	DB Fernverkehr	Intercity 2
RE 1	Norddeich Mole – Norden – Marienhafe – Emden – Leer – Oldenburg – Delmenhorst – Bremen – Nienburg – Hannover	Two hours	DB Regio Nord	
