= Norden station (Germany) =

Railway station in Norden, Germany

Norden
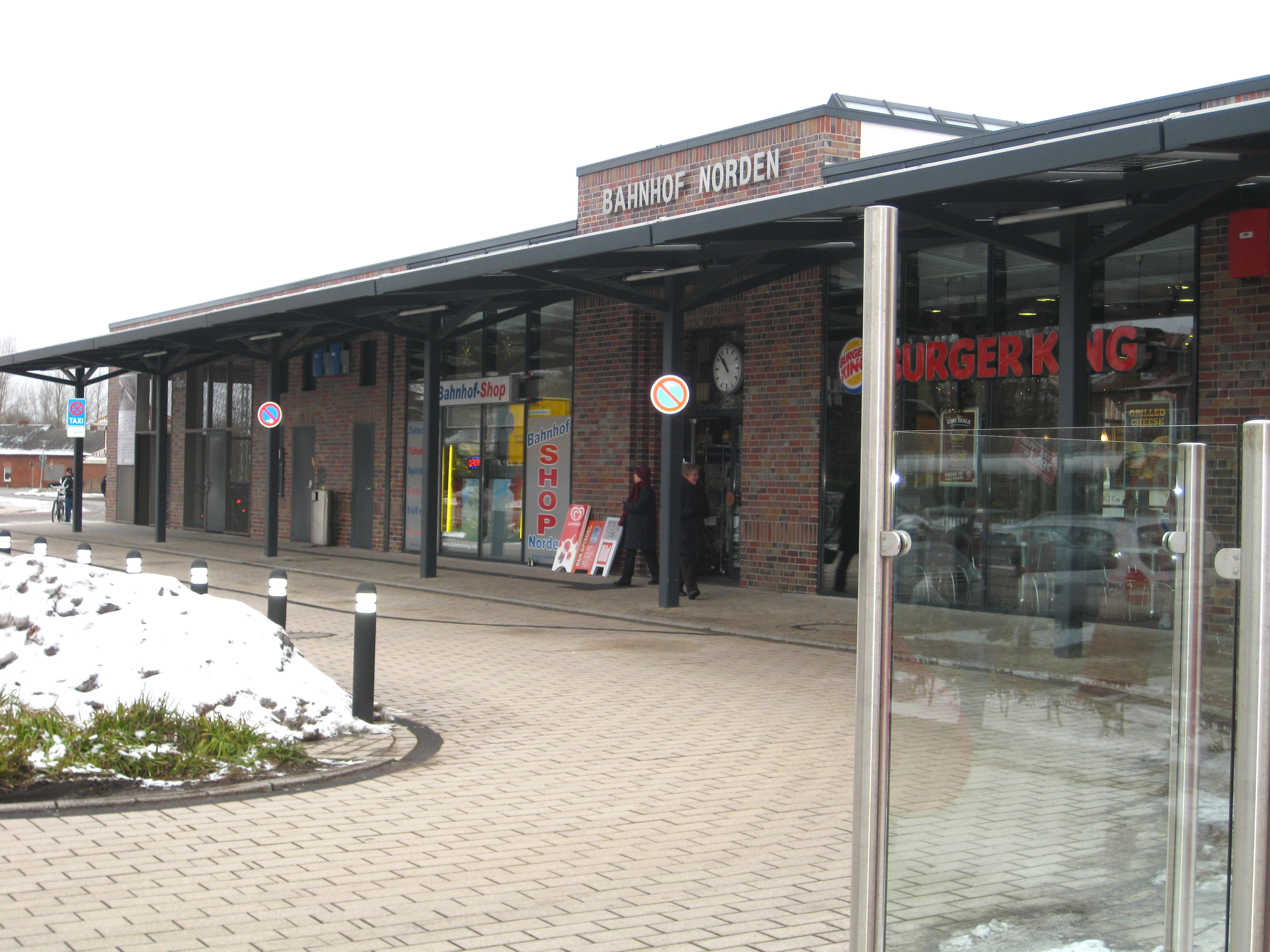
- Norden railway station

General information
- Location: Norden, Lower Saxony, Germany
- Coordinates: 53°35′16″N 7°13′09″E
- Lines: Emsland Railway; East Frisian Coastal Railway
- Platforms: 2
- Tracks: 2

Construction
- Accessible: Yes

Other information
- Website: www.bahnhof.de

History
- Opened: 1883

Services
| Preceding station | DB Fernverkehr | Following station |
|---|---|---|
| Norddeich towards Norddeich Mole | IC 35 | Emden Hbf towards Köln Hbf |
| Norddeich towards Norddeich Mole | IC 56 | Marienhafe towards Leipzig Hbf |
| Preceding station | DB Regio Nord | Following station |
| Norddeich towards Norddeich Mole | RE 1 | Marienhafe towards Hannover Hbf |
Location

Norden is a railway station located in Norden in East Frisia, Lower Saxony, Germany. It is a junction station situated on the Emsland Railway line (Rheine - Norddeich), with train services provided by Deutsche Bahn, and the historic Ostfriesische Küstenbahn (lit. 'East Frisian Coastal Railway'). The latter is operated by a heritage train on Sundays from June to October.

== Train services ==
In the 2026 timetable, the following services stop at the station:

| Line | Route | Interval | Operator | Rolling stock |
|---|---|---|---|---|
| IC 35 | Norddeich Mole – Norden – Emden – Münster – Düsseldorf – Cologne | Two train pairs | DB Fernverkehr | Intercity 2 |
| IC 56 | Norddeich Mole – Norden – Emden – Bremen – Hanover – Braunschweig – Magdeburg – Leipzig | Four train pairs | DB Fernverkehr | Intercity 2 |
| RE 1 | Norddeich Mole – Norden – Emden – Leer – Oldenburg – Delmenhorst – Bremen – Nienburg – Hannover | Two hours | DB Regio Nord | |

== Heritage trains ==
The line from Norden to Dornum is a heritage railway operated by the MKO, the Museumseisenbahn Küstenbahn Ostfriesland e.V. (lit. 'Heritage railway Coastal Railway of East Frisia'). Heritage trains, a diesel locomotive hauling Donnerbüchse coaches, operates on Sundays from June to October on the section of the former Ostfriesische Küstenbahn (lit. 'East Frisian Coastal Railway'), which originally connected Norden with Dornum, Esens, Jever and Sande. The section between Dornum and Esens has been dismantled in 1986.

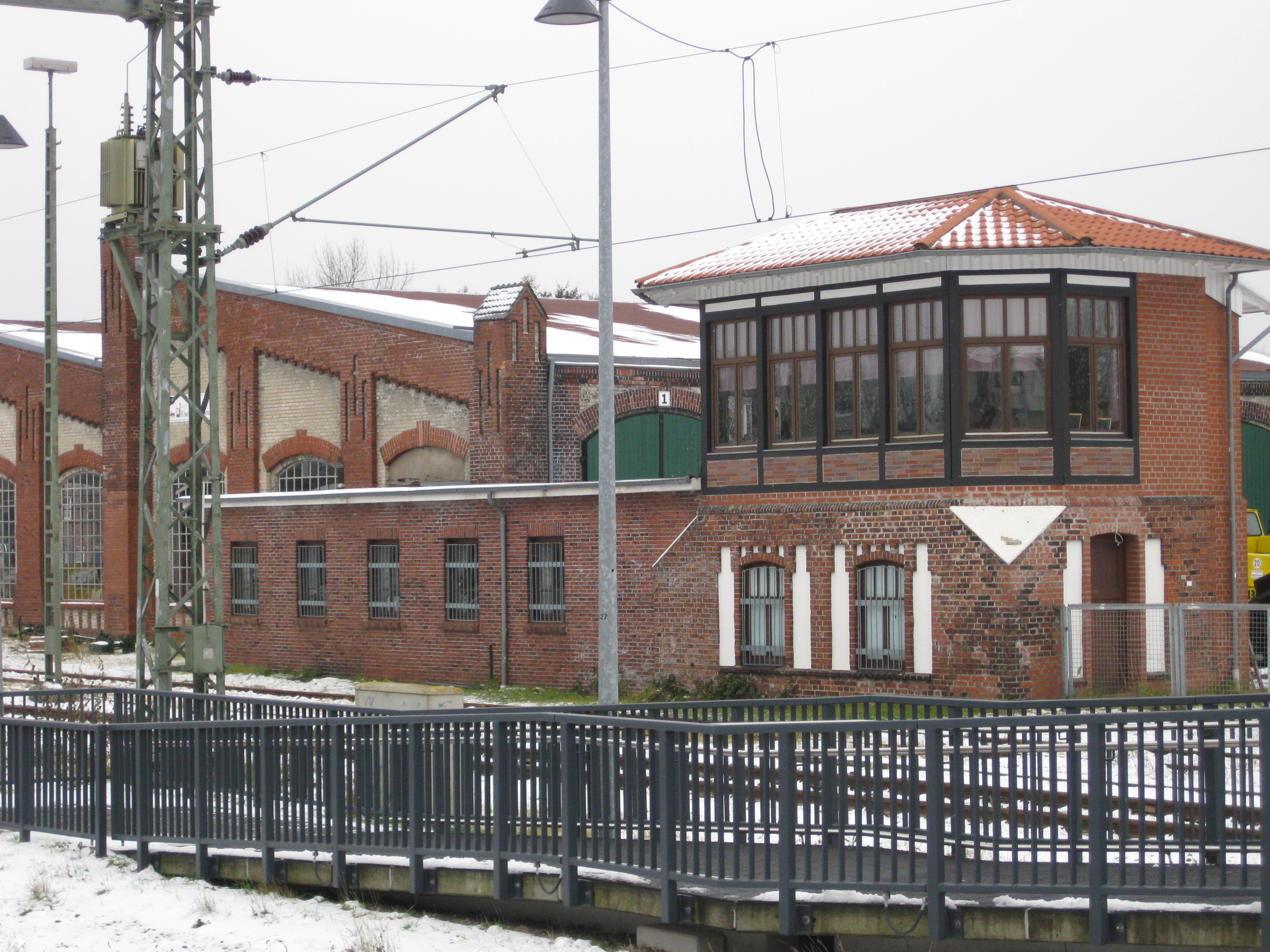
Former signal box at Norden Station

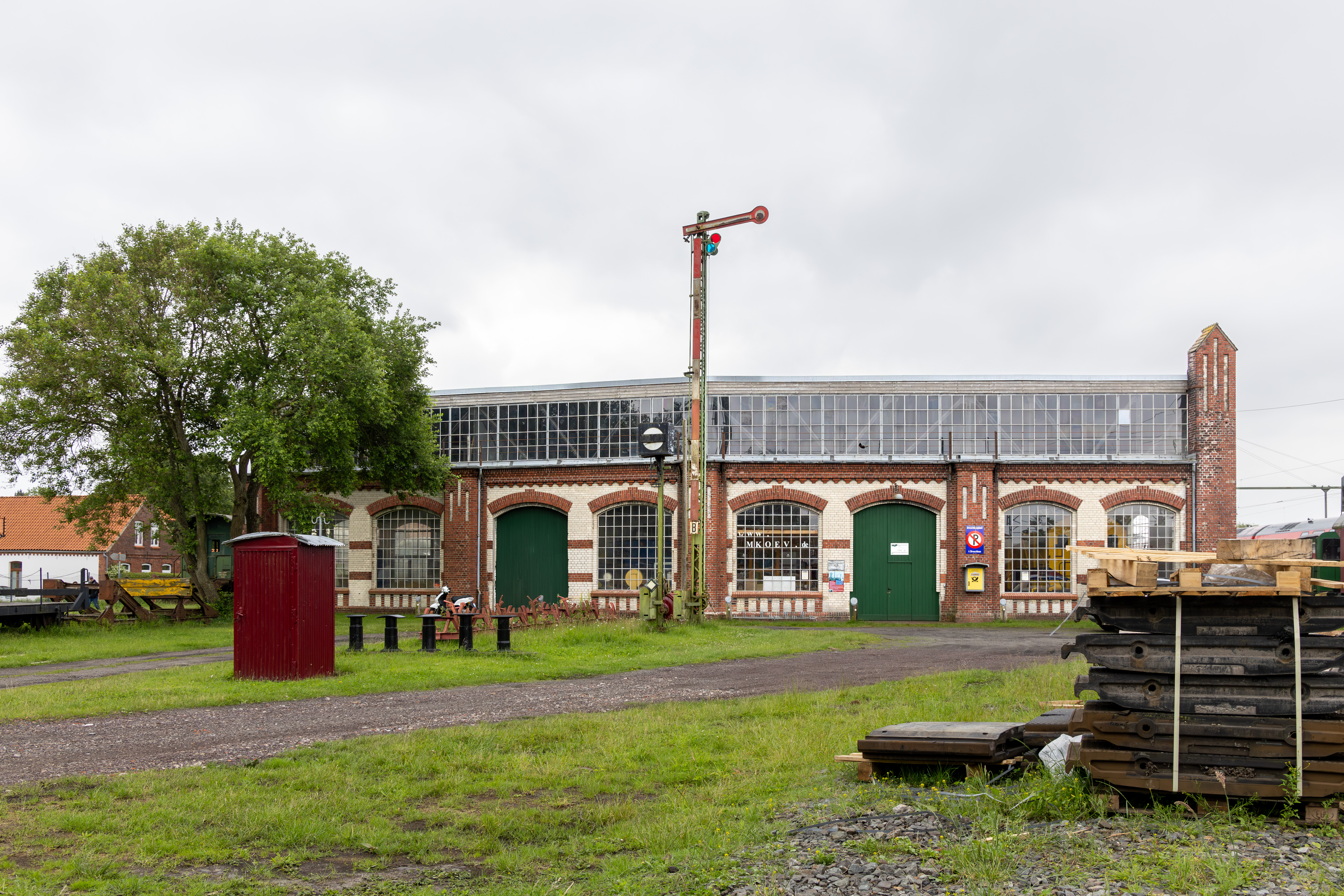
Former roundhouse, which is now a museum of historic rolling stock

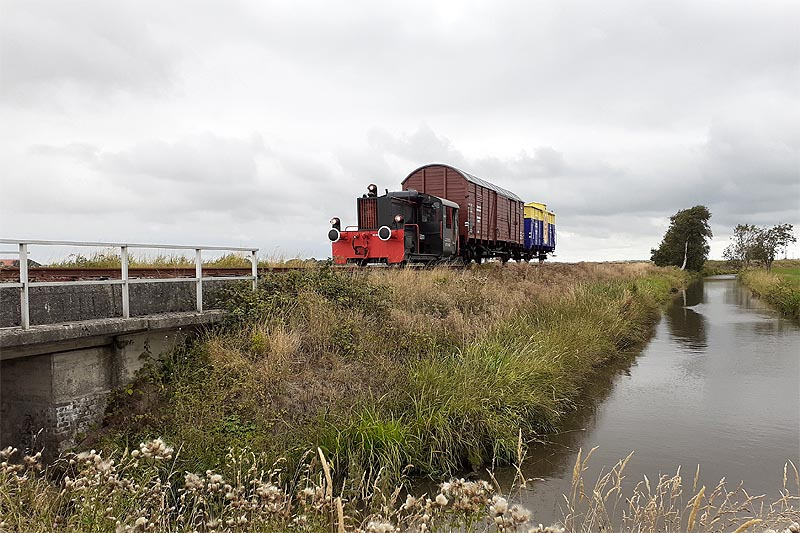
Köf locomotive pulling cargo coaches

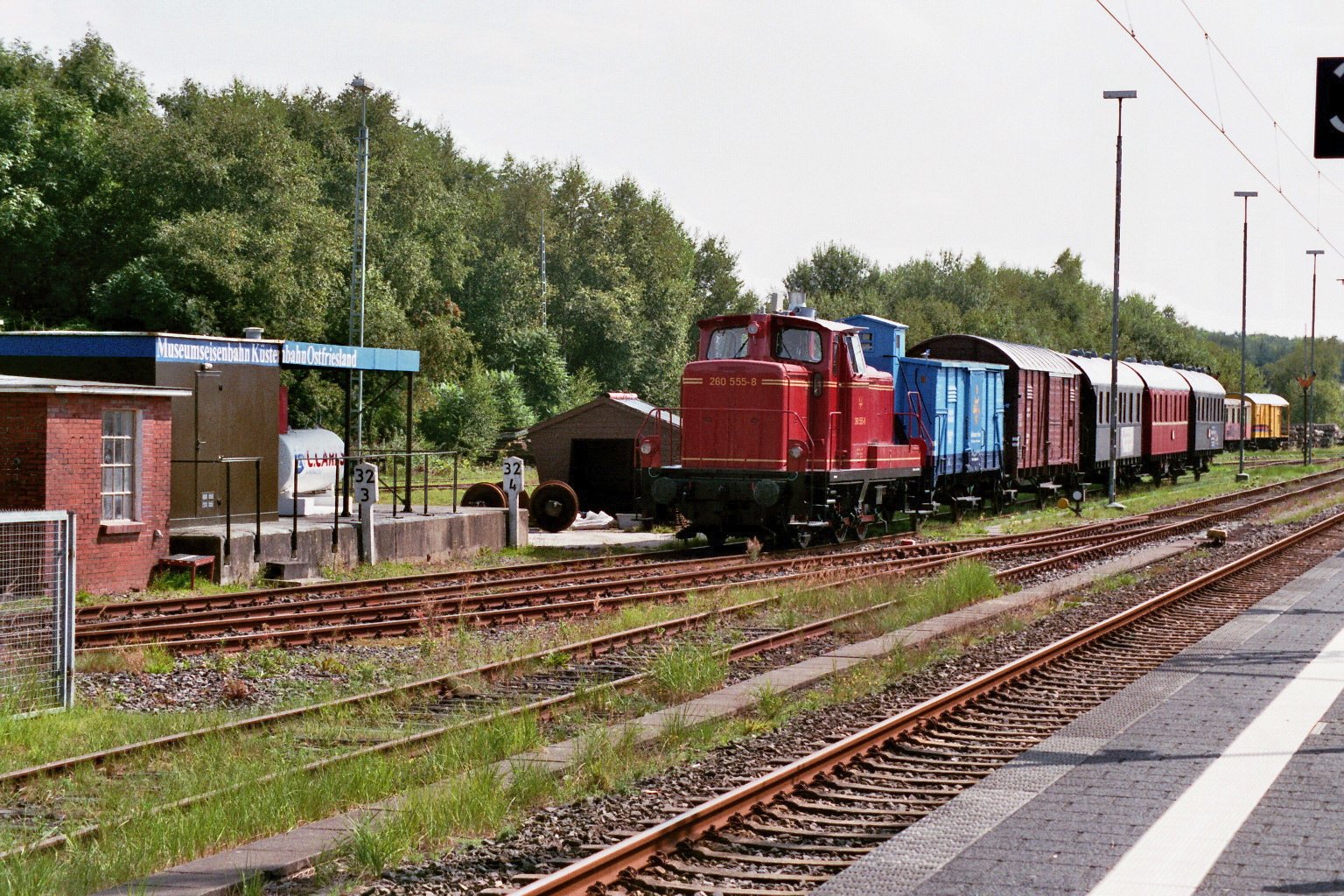
Heritage train (V 60 locomotive and coaches) at Norden station

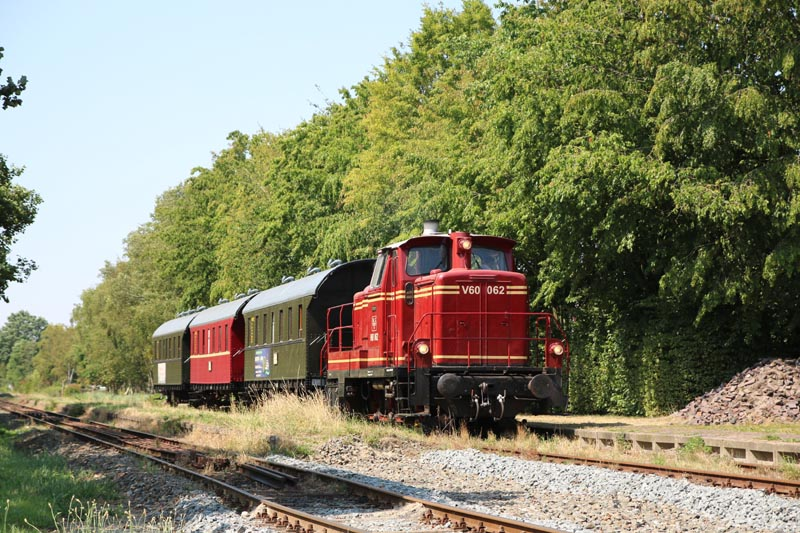
Heritage train in Dornum

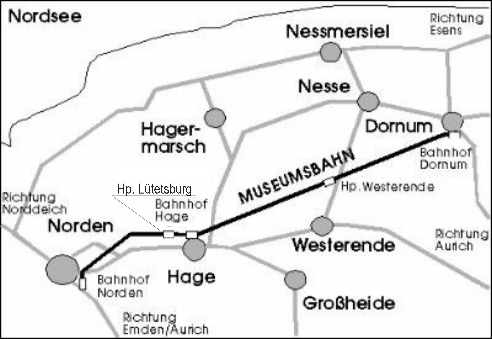
Norden–Dornum heritage railway line

== See also ==
- Rail transport in Germany
- Railway stations in Germany
