= Rzepin railway station =

Railway station in Rzepin, Poland

Coordinates: 52.3499°N 14.8152°E

Rzepin
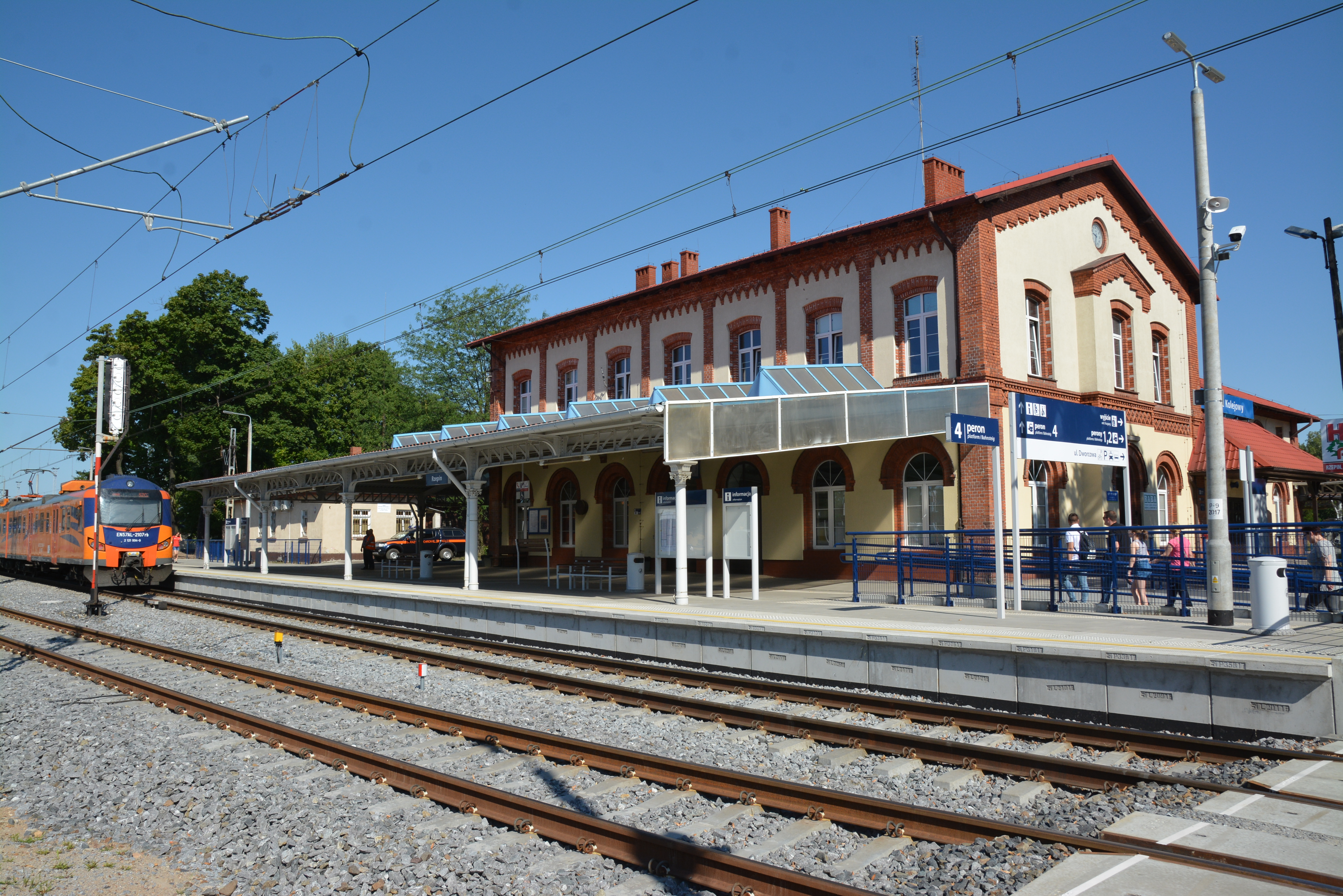
- Rzepin railway station

General information
- Location: Rzepin, Lubusz Voivodeship; Poland
- System: Railway Station
- Operator: PKP Polskie Linie Kolejowe
- Lines: Warsaw–Kunowice railway Wrocław–Szczecin railway Wierzbno–Rzepin railway
- Platforms: 6

Other information
- Fare zone: VBB: 5878 (to/from Germany only)

History
- Opened: 26 June 1870; 156 years ago

Services
Preceding station	PKP Intercity	Following station
Frankfurt (Oder) towards Berlin Hbf	EuroCity EC 95; EIC	Świebodzin towards Warszawa Wschodnia
Frankfurt (Oder) towards Berlin Hbf	EuroCity EC 95; IC	Świebodzin towards Gdynia Główna
Frankfurt (Oder) towards Berlin Hbf	EuroCity EC 95; IC	Zielona Góra Główna towards Przemyśl Główny
Kostrzyn towards Świnoujście	IC	Zielona Góra Główna towards Kraków Główny
Kostrzyn towards Świnoujście	TLK	Zielona Góra Główna towards Lublin Główny
Preceding station	Polregio	Following station
Terminus	PR	Boczów towards Zbąszynek
Kunowice towards Frankfurt (Oder)	PR	Jerzmanice Lubuskie towards Zielona Góra
Drzeńsko towards Kostrzyn	PR	Jerzmanice Lubuskie towards Zielona Góra

Former services
Preceding station	PKP Intercity	Following station
Frankfurt (Oder) towards Paris Est	EuroNight Moscou Express; Suspended 2020	Poznań Główny towards Moscow Belorussky
Location
- Location within Poland

Rzepin railway station is a railway station serving the town of Rzepin, in the Lubusz Voivodeship, Poland. The station is located on the Warsaw–Kunowice railway, Wrocław–Szczecin railway and Wierzbno–Rzepin railway. The train services are operated by PKP Intercity and Polregio.

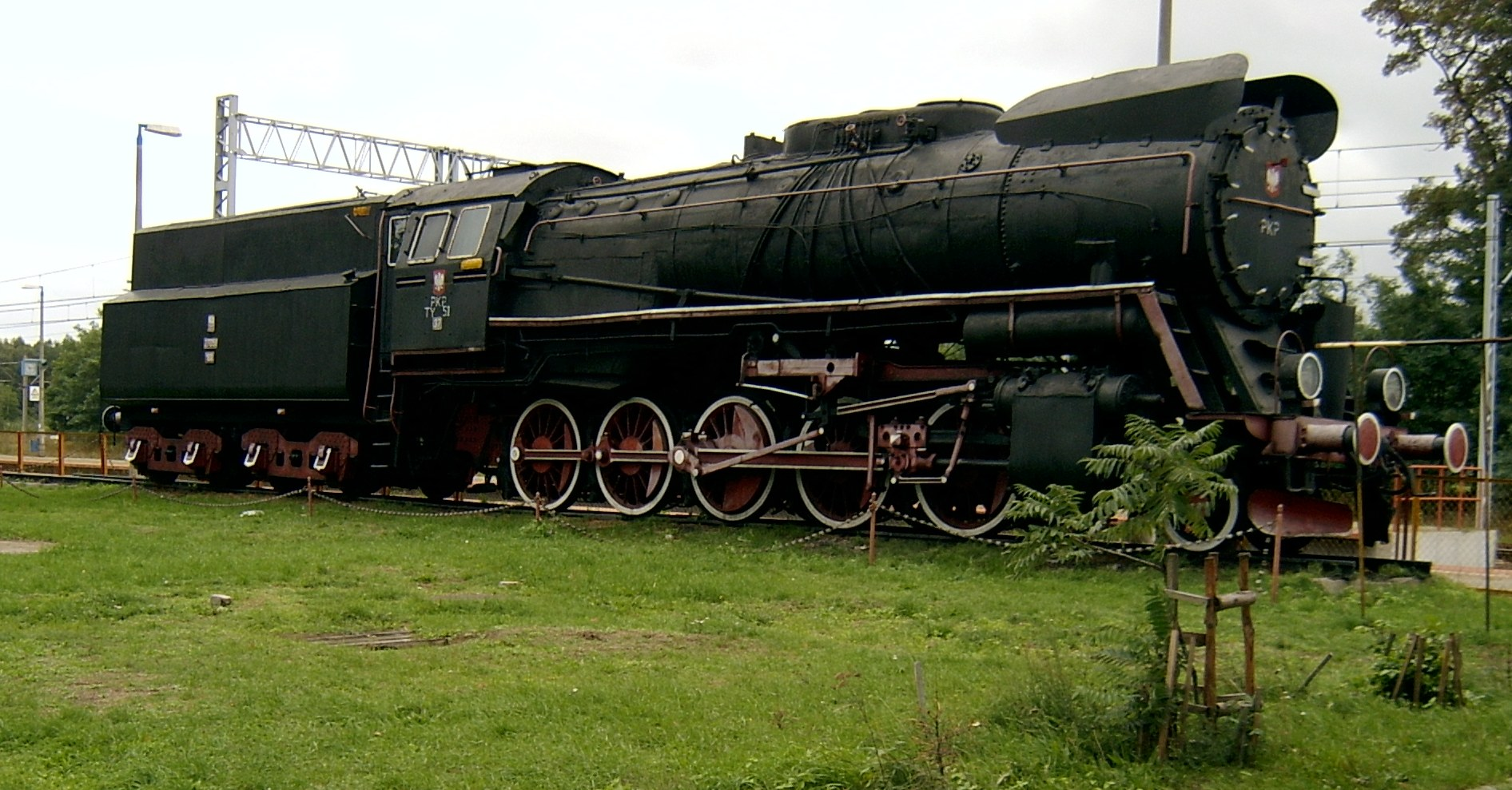
Ty51-37 steam train plinthed at the station

== Train services ==
The station is served by the following service(s):

- EuroCity services (EC) (EC 95 by DB) (EIC by PKP) Berlin - Frankfurt (Oder) - Rzepin - Poznan - Kutno - Warsaw
- EuroCity services (EC) (EC 95 by DB) (IC by PKP) Berlin - Frankfurt (Oder) - Rzepin - Poznan - Bydgoszcz - Gdansk - Gdynia
- EuroCity services (EC) (EC 95 by DB) (IC by PKP) Berlin - Frankfurt (Oder) - Rzepin - Wrocław – Katowice – Kraków – Rzeszów – Przemyśl
- EuroNight services (EN) Paris - Strasbourg - Berlin - Frankfurt (Oder) - Poznan - Warsaw - Brest - Minsk - Moscow
- Intercity services (IC) Swinoujscie - Szczecin - Kostrzyn - Rzepin - Zielona Gora - Wroclaw - Katowice - Kraków
- Intercity services (TLK) Lublin Główny — Świnoujście
- Regional services (R) Rzepin - Swiebodzin - Zbasynek
- Regional services (R) Zielona Gora - Rzepin - Frankfurt (Oder)/Kostrzyn
