= Jezierzany, Lower Silesian Voivodeship =

Jezierzany
- Village
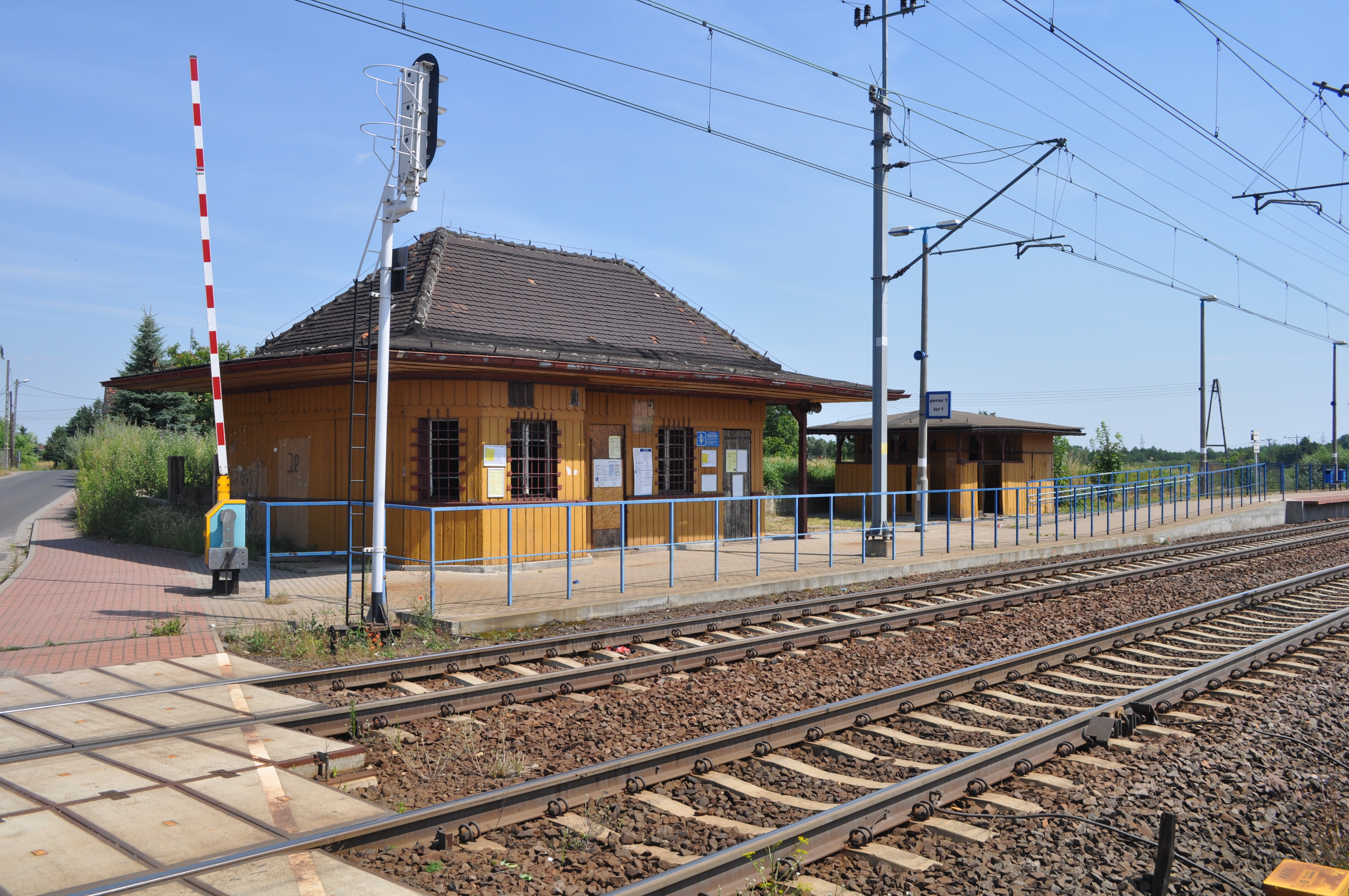
- Jezierzany railway station

- Location within Poland
- Coordinates: 51°14′14″N 16°05′58″E
- Country: Poland
- Voivodeship: Lower Silesian
- County: Legnica
- Gmina: Miłkowice

Jezierzany [jɛʑɛˈʐanɨ] (German: Seedorf) is a village in the administrative district of Gmina Miłkowice, within Legnica County, Lower Silesian Voivodeship, in south-western Poland.

The village is served by Jezierzany railway station.
