= Jezierzany railway station =

Railway station in south-western Poland

Jezierzany
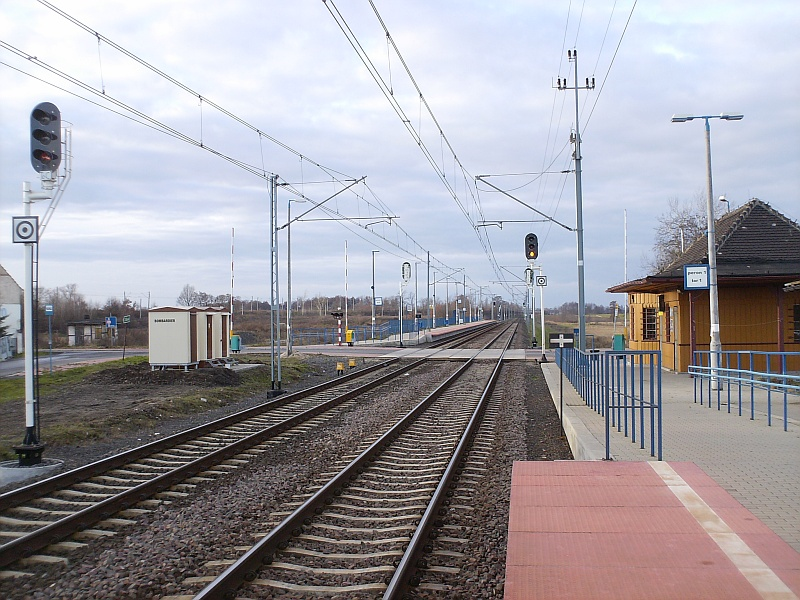
- Staggered platforms

General information
- Location: Jezierzany, Lower Silesian Voivodeship; Poland
- Coordinates: 51°14′08.0″N 16°05′51.1″E
- Owner: Polish State Railways
- Line: Wrocław–Gubinek railway
- Platforms: 2

History
- Opened: 19 May 1895
- Former names: Pansdorfer See (before 1945); Pątnowsk (1945–1947); Pątnówek (1947–1976)

Services
Preceding station	KD	Following station
Legnica towards Wrocław Główny	D1	Miłkowice towards Lubań Śląski
Legnica towards Wrocław Główny	D10	Miłkowice towards Dresden Hauptbahnhof
Location
- Location within Poland Location within Lower Silesian Voivodeship

Jezierzany is a railway station on the Wrocław–Gubinek railway in the village of Jezierzany, Legnica County, within the Lower Silesian Voivodeship in south-western Poland.

== History ==
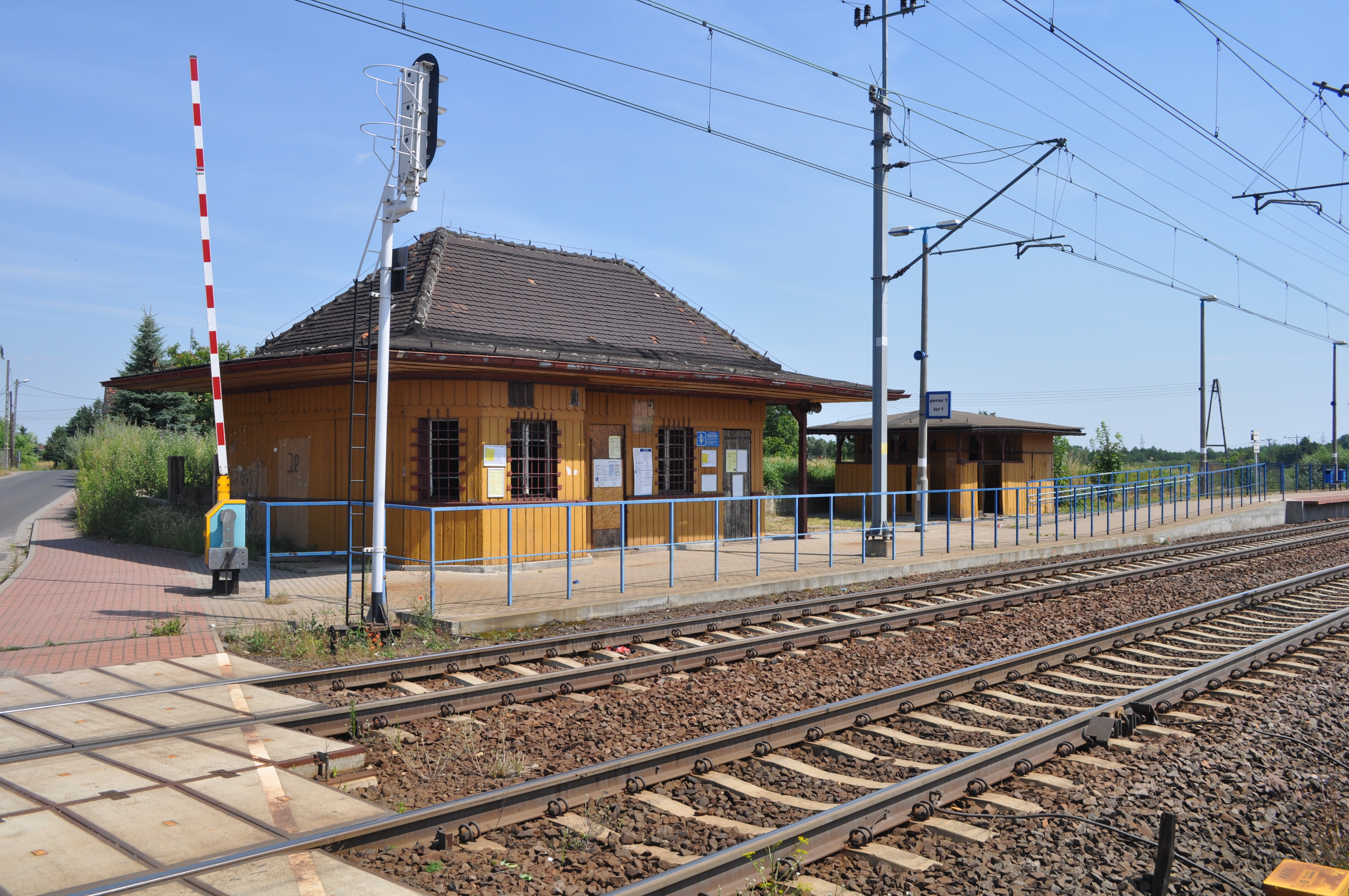
Station building

The station opened on 19 May 1895 as Pansdorfer See. After World War II, the area came under Polish administration. As a result, the station was taken over by Polish State Railways. The station was renamed to Pątnowsk and later to, Pątnówek in 1947.

The station received its current name, Jezierzany, in 1976. Part of the E30 main line modernisations, the station was modernised between 2004 and 2006.

== Train services ==
The station is a request stop of Lower Silesian Railways services.

The station is served by the following services:

- Regional services (KD) Wrocław - Legnica - Węgliniec - Lubań Śląski
- Regional services (KD) Wrocław - Legnica - Zgorzelec - Görlitz
