= Świebodzin railway station =

Railway station in Świebodzin, Poland

Coordinates: 52.2453°N 15.5397°E

Świebodzin
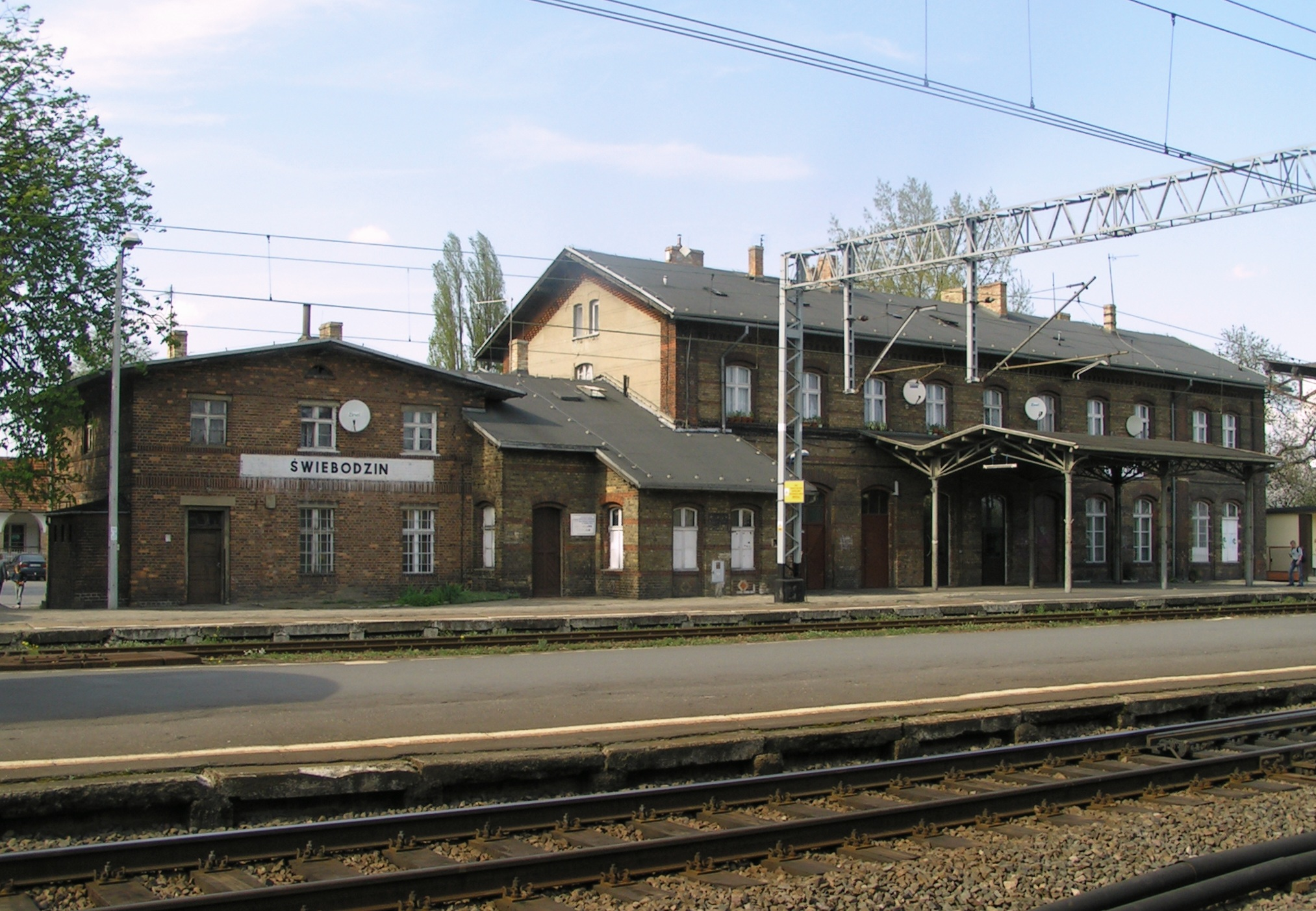
- Świebodzin railway station

General information
- Location: Świebodzin, Lubusz Voivodeship; Poland
- System: Railway Station
- Operator: PKP Polskie Linie Kolejowe
- Lines: Warsaw–Kunowice railway Sulechów–Świebodzin railway (closed)
- Platforms: 4
- Tracks: 4

Services
Preceding station	PKP Intercity	Following station
Rzepin towards Berlin Hbf	EuroCity EC 95; EIC	Zbąszynek towards Warszawa Wschodnia
Rzepin towards Berlin Hbf	EuroCity EC 95; IC	Zbąszynek towards Gdynia Główna
Rzepin towards Köln Hbf	EuroNight	Zbąszynek towards Warszawa Wschodnia
Preceding station	Polregio	Following station
Wilkowo Świebodzińskie towards Rzepin	PR	Kupienino towards Zbąszynek
Location
- Location within Poland

Świebodzin railway station is a railway station serving the town of Świebodzin, in the Lubusz Voivodeship, Poland. The station is located on the Warsaw–Kunowice railway and the train services are operated by PKP and Polregio.

The station was also on the Sulechów–Świebodzin railway, which closed to passenger services in 1988 and freight services in 1990.

== Train services ==
The station is served by the following service(s):

- EuroCity services (EC) (EC 95 by DB) (EIC by PKP) Berlin - Frankfurt (Oder) - Rzepin - Poznan - Kutno - Warsaw
- EuroCity services (EC) (EC 95 by DB) (IC by PKP) Berlin - Frankfurt (Oder) - Rzepin - Poznan - Bydgoszcz - Gdansk - Gdynia
- EuroNight services (EN) Cologne - Duisburg - Dortmund - Berlin - Frankfurt (Oder) - Poznan - Kutno - Warsaw
- Regional services (R) Rzepin - Swiebodzin - Zbasynek
