= Norddeich station =

Railway station in Norddeich, Germany

Norddeich
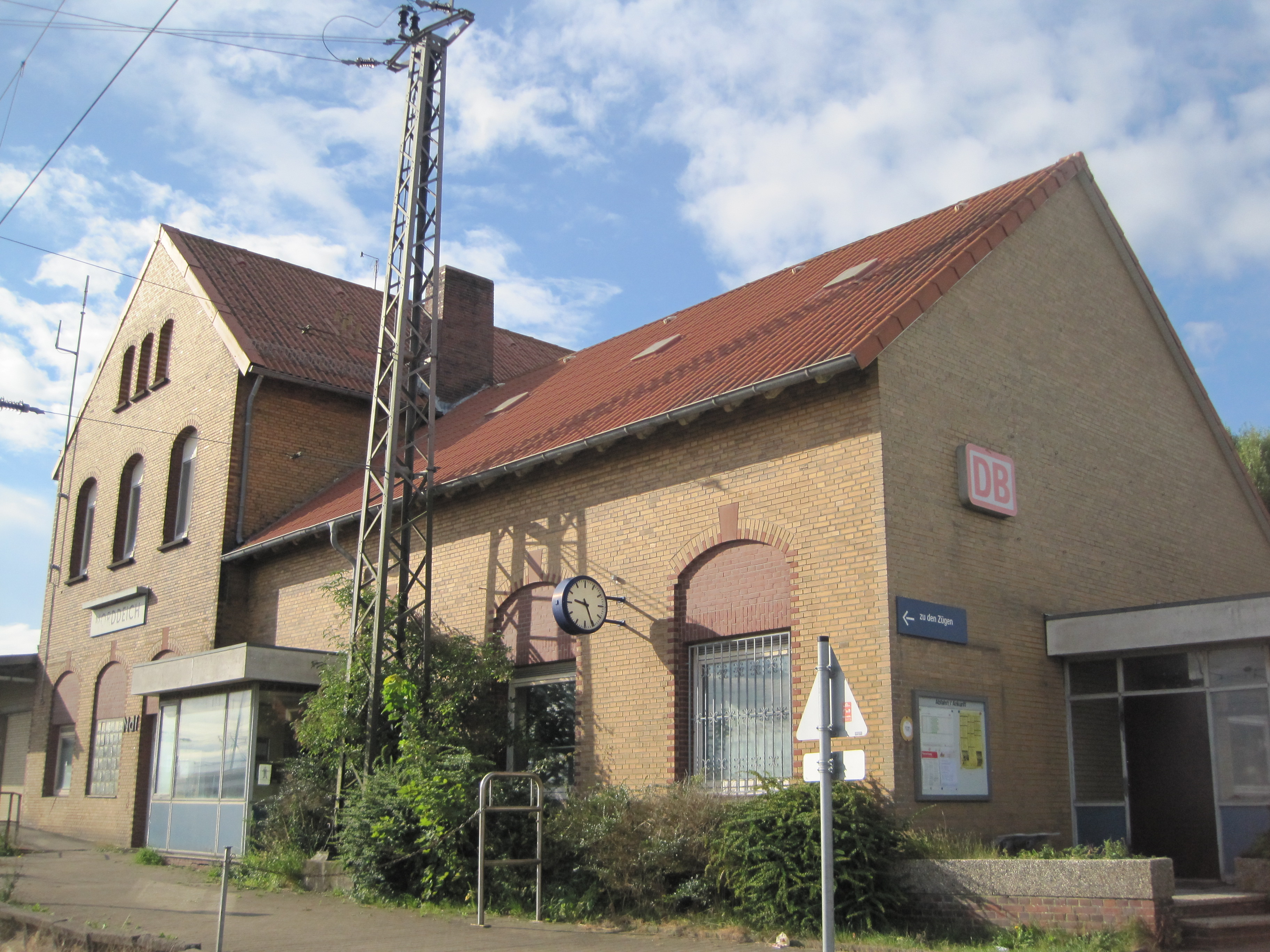
- Norddeich railway station

General information
- Location: Norddeich, Lower Saxony, Germany
- Coordinates: 53°37′16″N 7°09′42″E
- Owner: Deutsche Bahn
- Operator: DB Netz; DB Station&Service
- Line: Emsland Railway
- Platforms: 3

Other information
- Website: www.bahnhof.de

History
- Opened: 1892
Preceding station	DB Fernverkehr	Following station
Norddeich Mole Terminus	IC 35	Norden towards Köln Hbf
Norddeich Mole Terminus	IC 56	Norden towards Leipzig Hbf
Preceding station	DB Regio Nord	Following station
Norddeich Mole Terminus	RE 1	Norden towards Hannover Hbf
Location
- Location within Lower Saxony Location within Germany Location within Europe

Norddeich is a railway station located in Norddeich, Lower Saxony, Germany. The station lies on the Emsland Railway (Rheine - Norddeich) and the train services are operated by Deutsche Bahn.

== Train services ==
The station is served by the following service(s):

Line	Route	Interval	Operator	Rolling stock
IC 35	Norddeich Mole – Norddeich – Emden – Münster – Düsseldorf – Cologne	Two train pairs	DB Fernverkehr	Intercity 2
IC 56	Norddeich Mole – Norddeich – Emden – Bremen – Hanover – Braunschweig – Magdeburg – Halle – Leipzig	Four train pairs	DB Fernverkehr	Intercity 2
RE 1	Norddeich Mole – Norddeich – Emden – Leer – Oldenburg – Bremen – Nienburg – Hannover	Two hours	DB Regio Nord	
