= Zielona Góra Główna railway station =

Railway station in Zielona Góra, Poland

Zielona Góra Główna Zielona Góra Main
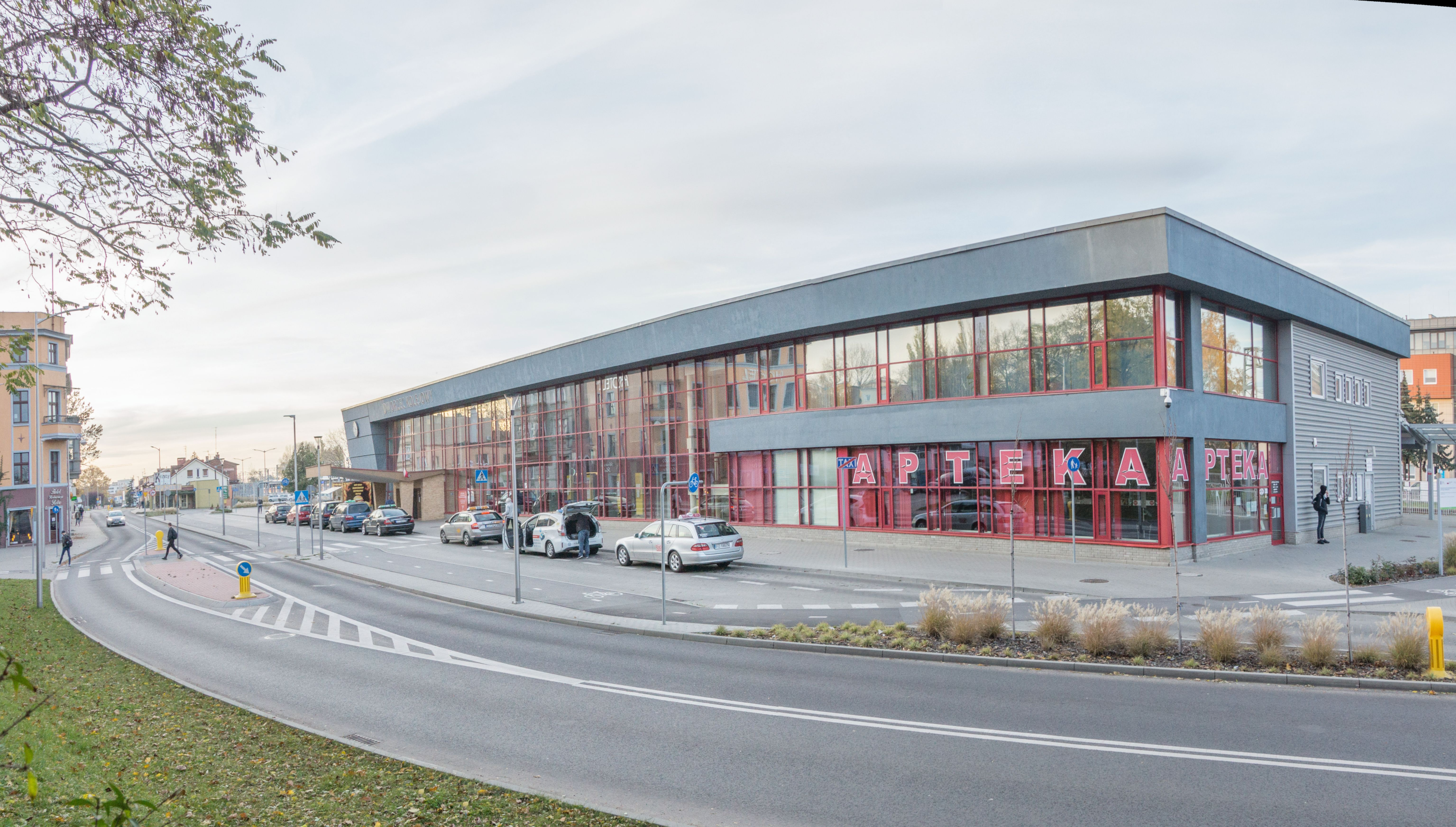

General information
- Location: Zielona Góra, Lubusz Voivodeship; Poland
- Coordinates: 51°56′51″N 15°30′52″E
- System: Railway Station
- Owner: Polskie Koleje Państwowe S.A.
- Lines: 273: Wrocław–Szczecin railway 370: Zielona Góra Główna–Żary; Zielona Góra Główna-Szprotawa (demolished)
- Platforms: 4
- Tracks: 5

History
- Opened: 1871; 155 years ago
- Former names: Grünberg, Grünberg Staatsbahnhof, Zielonagóra, Zielona Góra Północna, Zielona Góra Główna

Services
Preceding station	PKP Intercity	Following station
Rzepin towards Berlin Hbf	EuroCity EC 95; IC	Głogów towards Przemyśl Główny
Terminus	IC	Nowa Sól towards Przemyśl Główny
Rzepin towards Świnoujście	TLK	Nowa Sól towards Lublin Główny
Preceding station	Polregio	Following station
Zielona Góra Przylep towards Frankfurt (Oder) or Kostrzyn	PR	Terminus
Buchałów towards Görlitz	PR	Terminus
Zielona Góra Przylep towards Gorzów Wielkopolski	PR	Terminus
Zielona Góra Przylep towards Guben	PR	Terminus
Terminus	PR	Zielona Góra Stary Kisielin towards Wrocław Główny
Żary towards Jelenia Góra	PR	Terminus
Location
- Location within Poland

Zielona Góra Główna (lit. 'Zielona Góra Main') is a railway station in Zielona Góra, the largest city in Lubusz Voivodeship, Poland. According to the classification of passenger stations in Poland, it belongs to Voivodeship station. In 2018, the station served approximately 4,400 passengers a day.

== History ==
The station was built in 1871, when the city of Zielona Góra (German: Grünberg) was part of the German Empire. The current station building was built in the 1960s, and it was completely renovated during the 2000s to 2010s.

== Train services ==
Zielona Góra Główna has train connections to Gorzów Wielkopolski, Zbąszynek, Rzepin, Warsaw, Frankfurt (Oder) and Kraków, main cities of the surrounding regions: Poznań, Szczecin and Wrocław as well as direct international connections to Berlin, Vienna.

Operator	Destination station	Operator	Destination station
PKP Intercity	1. Berlin-Charlottenburg; 2. Berlin Hauptbahnhof; 3. Chełm; 4. Gdynia Główna; 5. Kraków Główny; 6. Lublin Główny; 7. Olsztyn Główny; 8. Przemyśl Główny; 9. Szczecin Główny; 10. Świnoujście; 11. Warszawa Wschodnia; 12. Wien Hauptbahnhof; 13. Wrocław Główny	Polregio	1. Brzeg; 2. Czerwieńsk; 3. Frankfurt (Oder); 4. Głogów; 5. Gorzów Wielkopolski; 6. Görlitz; 7. Kostrzyn; 8. Leszno; 9. Nowa Sól; 10. Oława; 11. Poznań Główny; 12. Rzepin; 13. Szczecin Główny; 14. Węgliniec; 15. Wrocław Główny; 16. Zbąszynek; 17. Żagań

The station is served by the following service(s):

- EuroCity services (EC) (EC 95 by DB) (IC by PKP) Berlin - Frankfurt (Oder) - Rzepin - Wrocław – Katowice – Kraków – Rzeszów – Przemyśl
- Intercity services (IC) Swinoujscie - Szczecin - Kostrzyn - Rzepin - Zielona Gora - Wroclaw - Katowice - Kraków
- Intercity services (IC) Gdynia - Gdańsk - Bydgoszcz - Poznań - Zielona Góra
- Intercity services (IC) Zielona Góra - Wrocław - Opele - Częstochowa - Kraków - Rzeszów - Przemyśl
- Intercity services (TLK) Lublin Główny — Świnoujście
- Regional services (R) Zielona Gora - Rzepin - Frankfurt (Oder)/Kostrzyn
- Regional services (R) Goerlitz (Görlitz station) - Żary - Zielona Góra Główna
- Regional services (R) Gorzów Wielkopolski - Zbąszynek - Zielona Góra Główna
- Regional services (R) Guben - Zielona Góra Główna
- Regional services (R) Wrocław - Głogów - Zielona Góra Główna
- Regional services (R) Jelenia Góra - Zielona Góra Główna
