= Wrocław–Szczecin railway =

Railway line in Poland

Overview
- Status: in use
- Locale: Poland
- Termini: Szczecin; Wrocław

Service
- Type: Heavy rail
- Route number: 273

History
- Opened: 1871

Technical
- Line length: 356.210 km (221.339 mi)
- Number of tracks: 2
- Track gauge: 1,435 mm (4 ft 8 1/2 in) standard gauge
- Electrification: 3000 V DC
- Operating speed: 120 km/h (75 mph)

The Wrocław–Szczecin railway is 356-kilometer long, double tracked, electrified railway line in Poland, connecting Wrocław with Zielona Góra, Rzepin, Kostrzyn and Szczecin.

The line is designated by Polish national railway infrastructure manager PKP Polskie Linie Kolejowe as rail line number 273 (Polish: linia kolejowa nr 273), and commonly referred to as the Odra River trunk line (magistrala nadodrzańska or nadodrzanka for short) as its course roughly follows the flow of the Odra river.

Since 1991 it is part of the European TEN-T route E 59 from Scandinavia to Vienna, Budapest and Prague.

== History ==
The line was constructed during the 19th century when western Poland was part of the German Kingdom of Prussia by the privately owned Wrocław-Świdnice-Świebodzice Railway Company (German: Breslau–Schweidnitz–Freiburger Eisenbahngesellschaft).

The company was established in 1841 with the original goal of connecting the regional capital of Silesia with the foothills of the Sudety mountains which were rich with natural resources. It sought to expand south to connect to the Austrian railways and north to the port of Świnoujście on the Baltic Sea to create a transport corridor between the Baltic and the Adriatic, however the northward expansion was blocked by the state which feared it will compete with the, by then nationalized, Lower Silesian-Mark Railway on the route to Berlin. The company only received permission at the end of 1860s when the line between Berlin and Wrocław was deemed sufficiently developed.

The first section of the line opened on 1 October 1871 originally extending from a preexisting branch line between Jaworzyna Śląska on the line to Świebodzice and a junction with the Lower Silesian-Mark Railway in Legnica (west of Wrocław) to Rudna and Głogów. From the late 1860s the line was extended as follows:

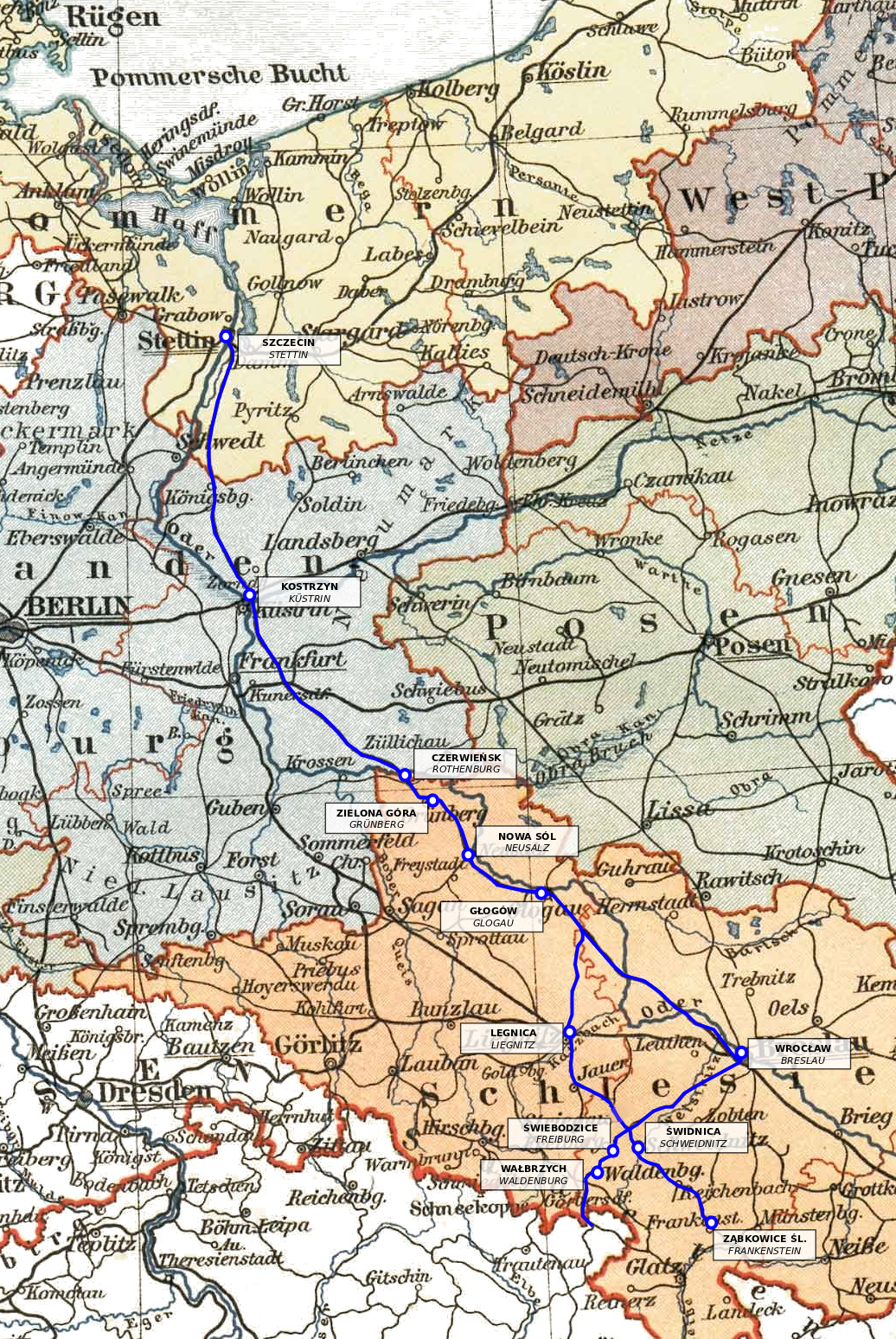
Wrocław-Świdnice-Świebodzice Railway in 1886

- December 1869: from Legnica to Lubin (present day PKP rail line 289),
- 9 January 1871: to Rudna (present day PKP rail line 289),
- October 1871: to Czerwieńsk,
- June 1874: to Rzepin,
- 1 February 1875: to Kostrzyn nad Odrą (for wagonload traffic),
- 15 May 1875: from Rzepin to Kostrzyn (Odrą) (for overall traffic),
- November 1876: to Chojna,
- 15 May 1877 to Szczecin.

On 1 August 1874 the line between Wrocław and Rudna, via Brzeg opened, bypassing Legnica. Plans to reach Świnoujście were ultimately abandoned by the company.

The final stations were originally the today defunct Wrocław Świebodzki railway station German: Breslau-Freiburger Bahnhof) and Szczecin Dworzec Wrocławski (German: Stettin-Breslauer Bahnhof originally under the name of Stettin-Breslau-Freiburger Bahnhof), today part of the Szczecin Port Centralny cargo station.

In 1884 the company was nationalized and dissolved shortly afterwards in 1886 with its lines transferred to the Wrocław directorate of the Prussian state railways.

Between 1912 and 1941 the line was upgrade to two tracks.

In the 1940s the Regalica bridge in Szczecin was destroyed, trains took a detour via Dąbie station, where the locomotive had to run around to change direction unit the bridge was restored in 1949.

After Germany's defeat in World War II as a result of the land being returned to Poland the railway became part of the Polish State Railways (PKP).

In 1945 soviets dismantled the second track a supposed war reparations despite the line belonging to Poland, however PKP gradually restored it in the 1970s.

In 1979 electrification of the line was started. The dates for electrification are:

- 1979: Szczecin Główny - Szczecin Port Centralny
- 1982: Wrocław Główny – Ścinawa
- December 1982: Ścinawa – Wróblin Głogowski
- December 1983: Wróblin Głogowski – Czerwieńsk and SPA – Nowe Czarnowo (Dolna Odra)
- December 1984: Czerwieńsk - Jerzmanice Lubuskie
- May 1985: Czerwieńsk - Dolna Odra

In the years 1945 to 2007, several stations on the route have been closed, with a few new stations opened. Station closed in the 1960s or 1970s are Krzydłowice between Rudna Gwizdanów and Grębocice, around the same time closing a station near Orzeszków near Wołów. In the mid 1970s, after opening the Głógów Copper Smelter and Refinery, the station Głogów Huta was opened and with the opening of the Dolna Odra Power Station the Nowe Czarnowo railway station was closed and a new one called Dolna Odra was built closer to the plant. In the mid 1980s Czerna Mała station was built in the village of Czerna. The end of the communist era brought the closure of the Wrocław Świebodzki railway station by then used as freight-yard and Chyrzyno station. In approximately 1991 Będów station was opened between Czerwieńsk and Rzepin. The last station closed was Szczecin Klucz in 1997. Due to the high popularity of freight traffic, Kostrzyn freight yard has never been a passenger station, despite the construction of the platform. For technical reasons trains were not allowed to handle passengers due to the position of the Overhead Wire masts on the platforms. In 2011 a new stop Wrocław Stadion was built next to the city stadium and in 2023 Szczecin Łasztownia.

Since 2015 PKP PLK has been carrying out modernization work along the line.

== Usage ==
The line is used by the following service(s):

- Intercity services between Świnoujście, Szczecin and Wrocław, along the length of the line.
- Regional services between Szczecin, Kostrzyn, Rzepin, Zielona Góra and Wrocław.

== See also ==
- Railway lines of Poland
