= Lubin railway station =

Main railway station of Lubin, Poland

Lubin
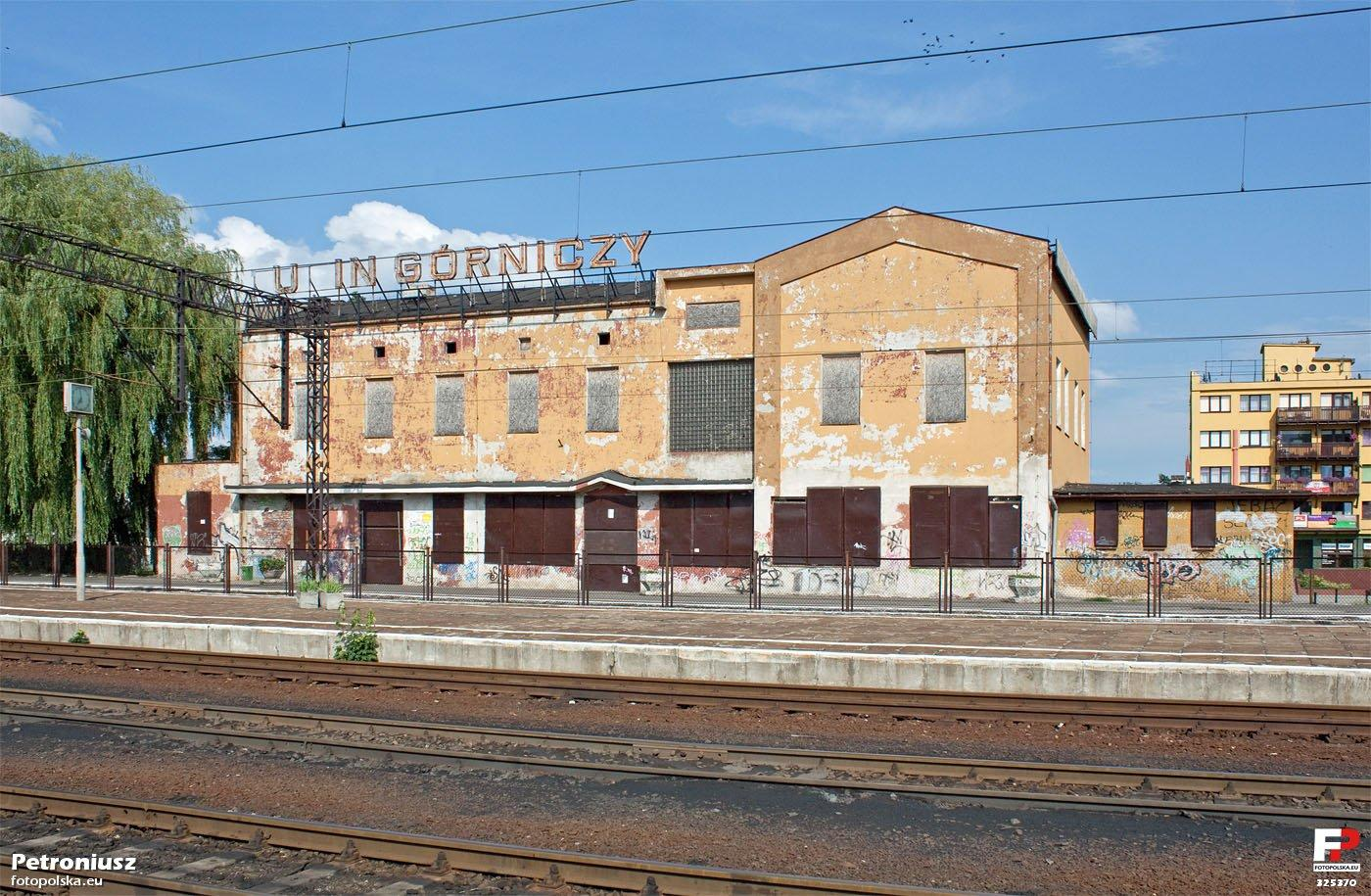
- Station building in 2012, prior to its demolition and the modernisation of the station

General information
- Location: Lubin, Lower Silesian Voivodeship; Poland
- Coordinates: 51°23′47.0″N 16°11′37.0″E
- Owner: Polish State Railways
- Lines: Legnica–Rudna Gwizdanów railway; Lubin–Chocianów railway (closed)
- Platforms: 4

History
- Opened: 1 October 1871
- Former names: Lüben (1871–1945); Lubin Lignicki (1945–1946); Lubin Legnicki (1946–1967); Lubin (1967–1981); Lubin Górniczy (1981–2019)
Location
- Location within Poland Location within Lower Silesian Voivodeship

Lubin, until 2019 Lubin Górniczy (German: Lüben) is the main railway station of the city of Lubin, in the Lower Silesian Voivodeship in south-western Poland.

== History ==
The station was opened by the Wrocław-Świdnica-Świebodzice Railway Company as Lüben on 25 December 1869. On 1 October 1871 the Legnica–Rudna Gwizdanów railway opened. This followed by the Lubin–Chocianów railway which opened on 21 February 1916.

After World War II, the area came under Polish administration. As a result, the station was taken over by Polish State Railways. The station was renamed three times: Lubin Lignicki in 1945, Lubin Legnicki in 1946, Lubin in 1967, and Lubin Górniczy in 1981.

In 1985 passenger services were withdrawn on the Lubin–Chocianów railway, which was later dismantled in 1991. The first electric train on the Legnica–Rudna Gwizdanów railway arrived at the station on 10 September 1986, after the line was electrified.

Between 2010 and 2019 the station was closed to only freight traffic. Prior to this, from 2004, only seasonal trains called at the station; all regular passenger services had already been withdrawn. The station building was demolished in 2012, despite the demolition being widely opposed among locals.

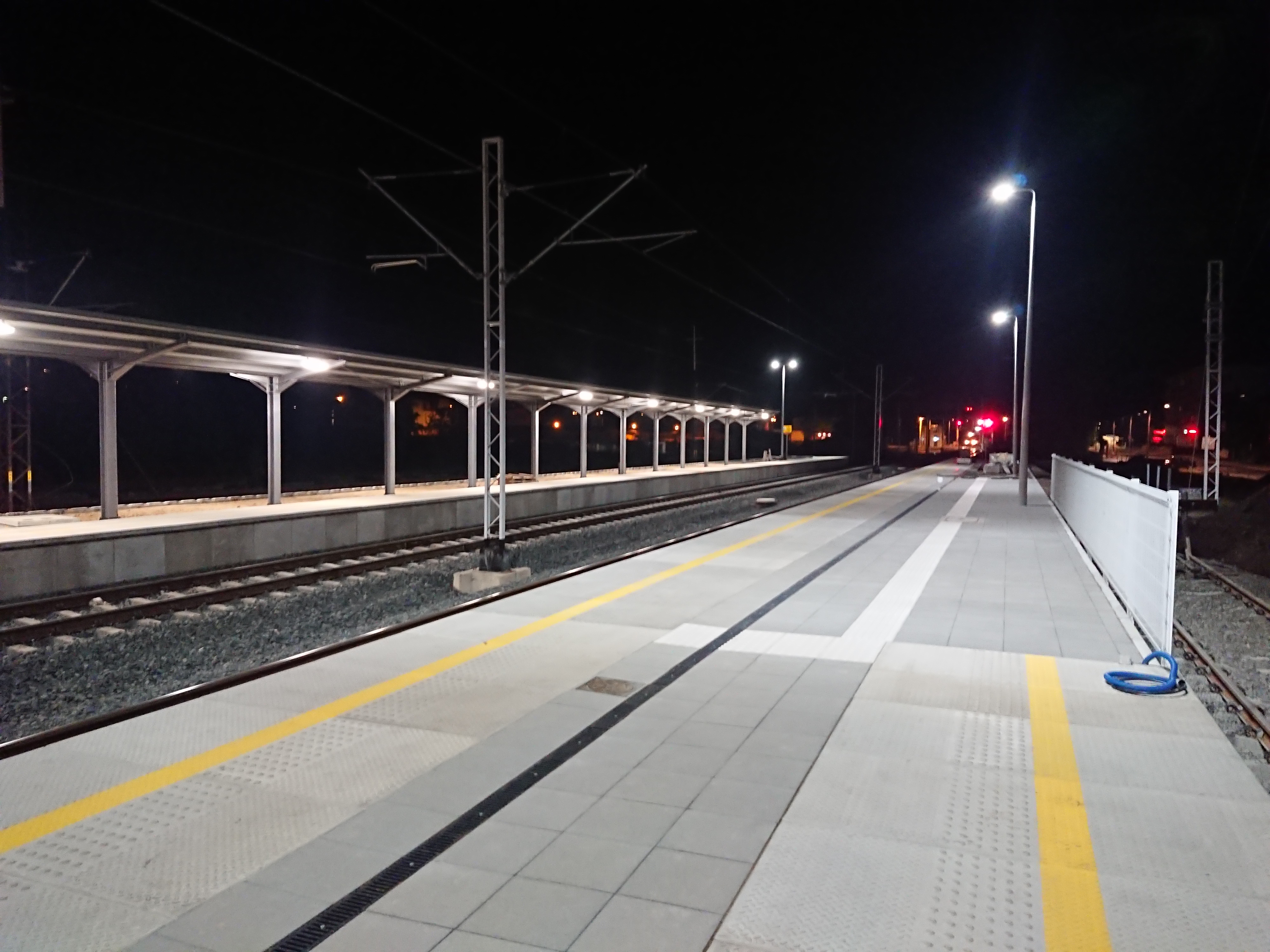
Newly constructed platforms in 2019

In 2018, the station underwent major renovation and modernisation works in preparation for the reopening of the Legnica–Rudna Gwizdanów railway. New high-level boarding platforms, at a length of 200 m (660 ft) were constructed. The following year in 2019, the station was renamed back to Lubin. On 9 June 2019, the first section of the line opened, with the station temporarily serving as a terminus, until 15 December 2019, when the full line opened.

== Train services ==
The station is served by the following services:

- Regional services (KD) Wrocław - Legnica - Lubin - Głogów
