= Norddeich (Norden) =

- Ortsteil of Norden
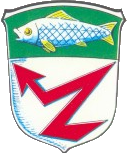
- Coat of arms

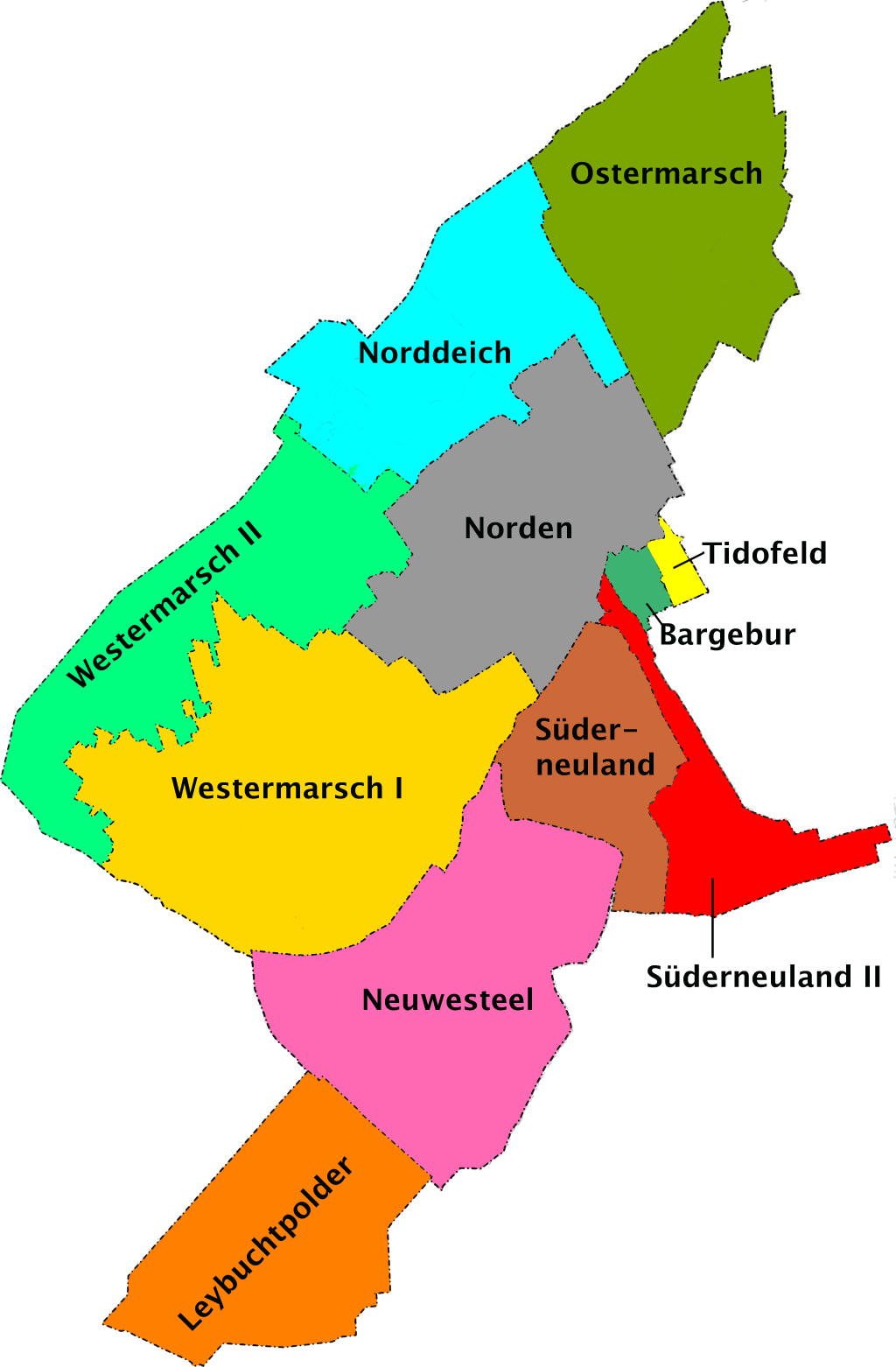
- Location of Norddeich (light blue) in the borough of Norden
- Interactive map of Norddeich
- Location within Germany Location within Lower Saxony
- Coordinates: 53°36′52″N 07°09′03″E
- Country: Germany
- State: Lower Saxony
- District: Aurich
- Town: Norden

Area
  - Total: 9.61 km^{2} (3.71 sq mi)
- Elevation: 1.4 m (4.6 ft)

Population (2011)
  - Total: 1,540
  - Density: 160/km^{2} (415/sq mi)
- Time zone: UTC+01:00 (CET)
  - Summer (DST): UTC+02:00 (CEST)
- Postal codes: 26506
- Dialling codes: 04931

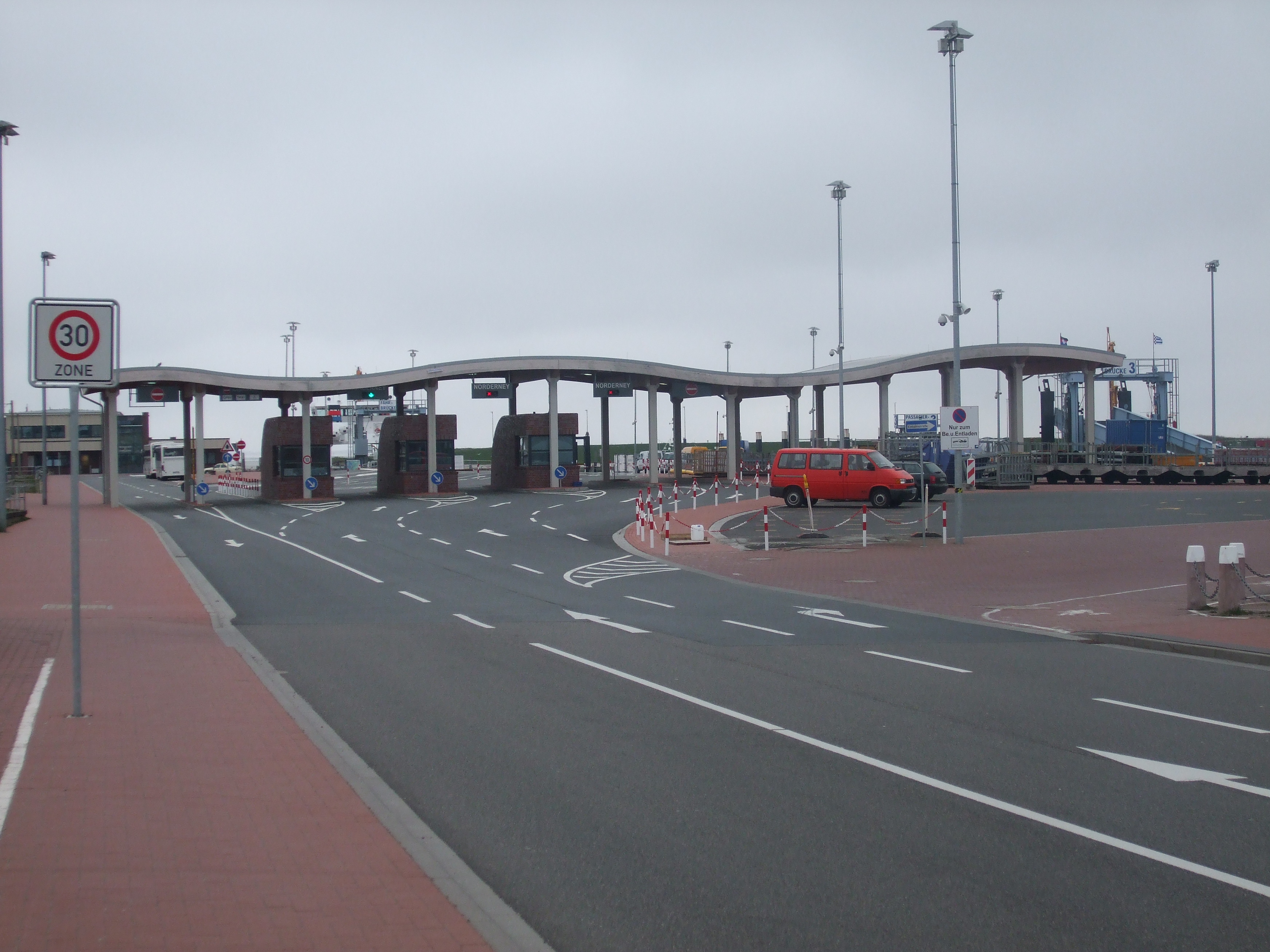
Ferry port of Norddeich (2010)

Norddeich (German pronunciation: [ˈnɔʁtdaɪç]; Low Saxon: Nörddiek) is a village in the borough of Norden in north Germany with 1,540 inhabitants (2011). It lies in northwestern East Frisia, Lower Saxony on the North Sea coast.

Since 1979 Norddeich has been officially designated as a "state-recognised North Sea spa" and is the largest of its kind on the coast of the East Frisian mainland.

Each year around 175,000 vehicles and 2.25 million people are ferried from the harbour to the nearby islands of Juist and Norderney. Norddeich is the third largest passenger port in Germany after Puttgarden and Rostock, and the largest in Lower Saxony.
