= Norddeich Mole station =

Railway station in Norddeich, Germany

Coordinates: 53°37′28″N 7°09′32″E

Norddeich Mole
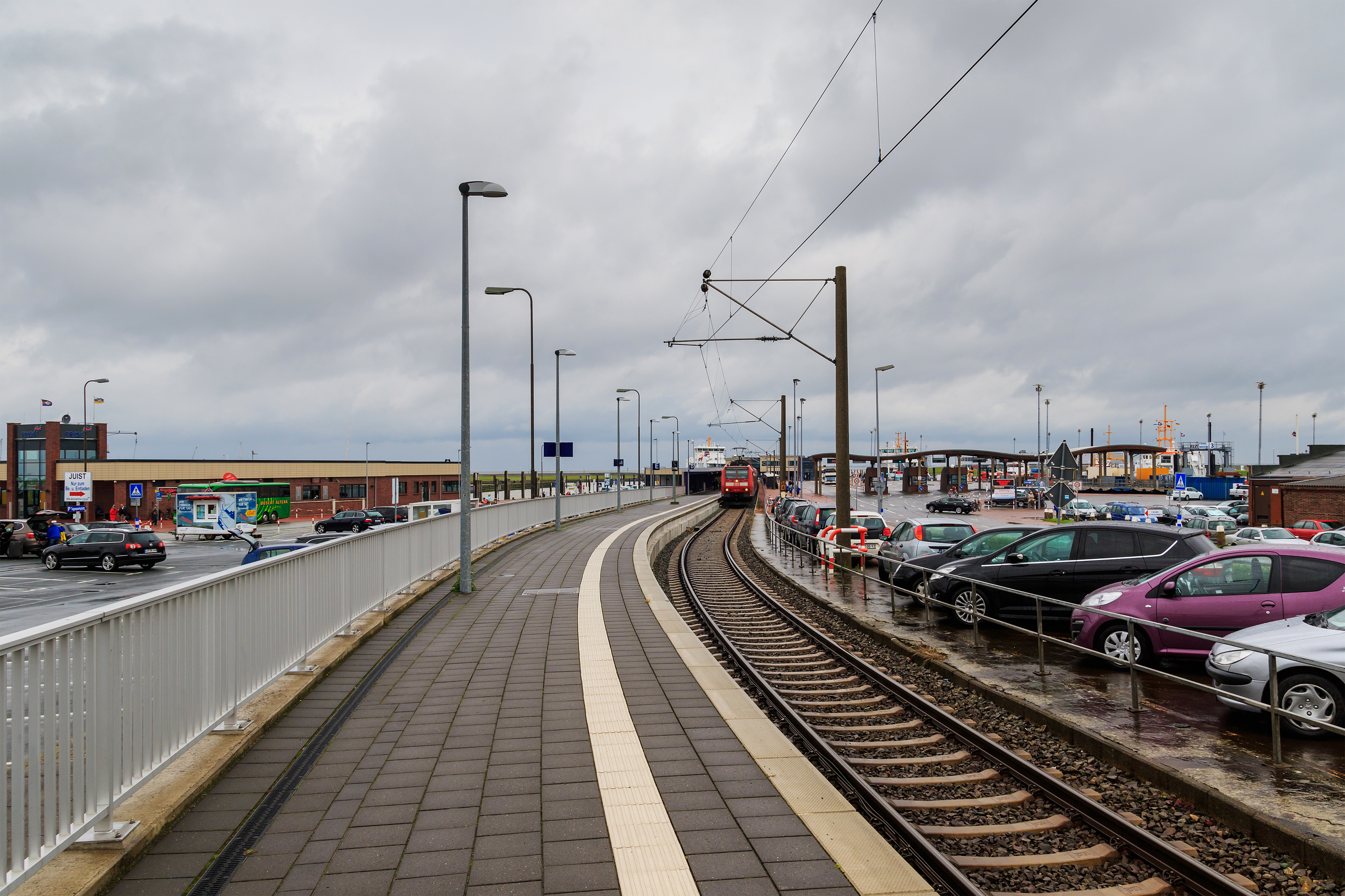
- Norddeich Mole railway station

General information
- Location: Norddeich, Lower Saxony; Germany
- Owner: DB Netz
- Operator: DB Station&Service
- Line: Emsland Railway
- Platforms: 1

Other information
- Station code: 4570
- Category: 4
- Website: www.bahnhof.de

Services
Preceding station	DB Fernverkehr	Following station
Terminus	IC 35	Norddeich towards Köln Hbf
Terminus	IC 56	Norddeich towards Leipzig Hbf
Preceding station	DB Regio Nord	Following station
Terminus	RE 1	Norddeich towards Hannover Hbf
Location
- Location within Lower Saxony

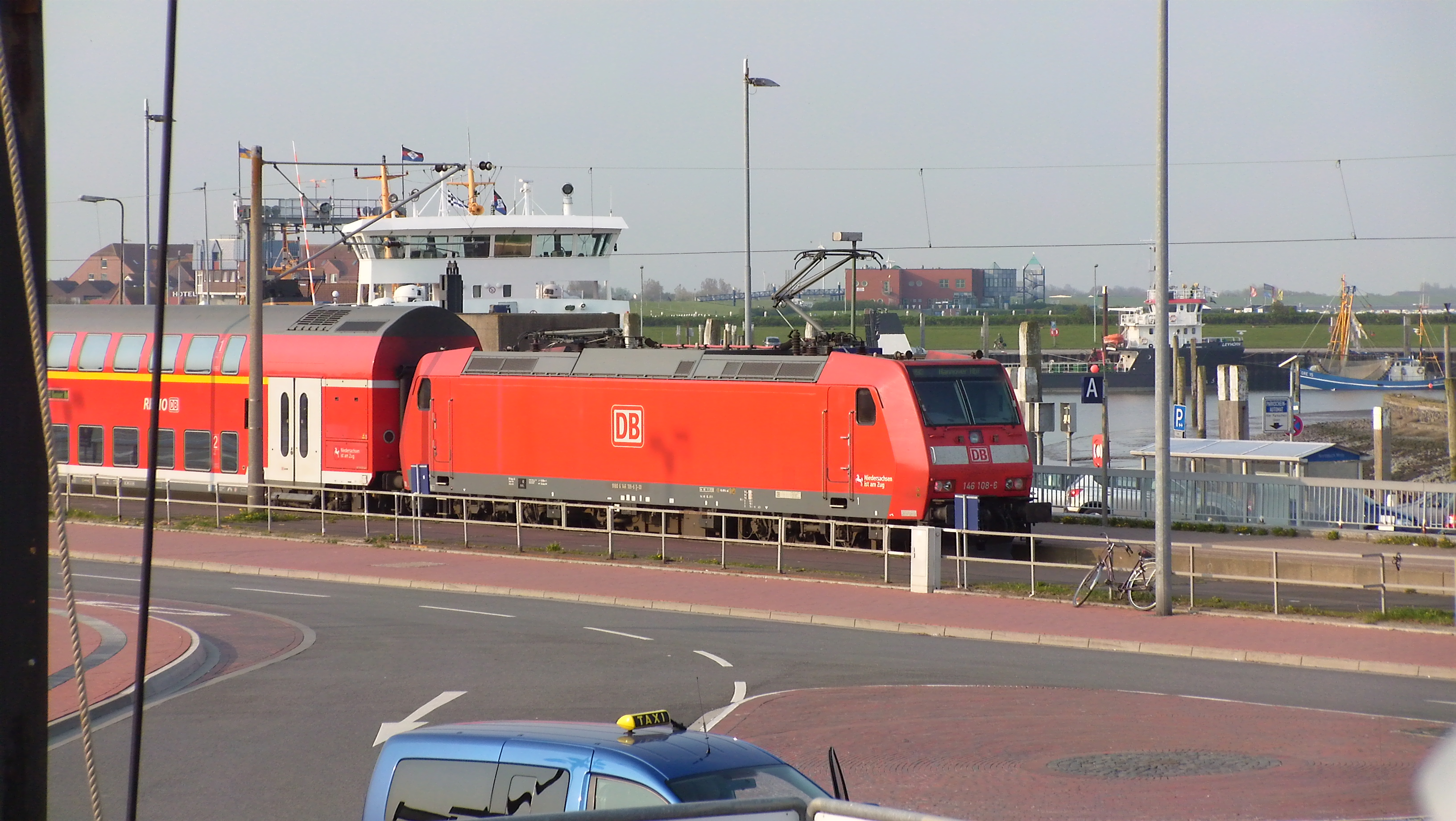
Bombardier's Class 146 train with a Bombardier Double-deck Coach (Regionalexpress) in the railway station of Norddeich Mole in 2011

Norddeich Mole is a railway station located in Norddeich, Lower Saxony, Germany. The station is located on the Emsland Railway. The train services are operated by Deutsche Bahn.

Norddeich Mole is a port for combined passenger and car ferries to the islands of Norderney and Juist, both very popular among holidaymakers, many of whom arrive by train (especially during the summer).

== Train services ==
In the 2026 timetable, the following services stop at the station:

Line	Route	Interval	Operator	Rolling stock
IC 35	Norddeich Mole – Norden – Emden – Münster – Düsseldorf – Cologne	Two train pairs	DB Fernverkehr	Intercity 2
IC 56	Norddeich Mole – Norden – Emden – Bremen – Hanover – Braunschweig – Magdeburg – Leipzig	Three train pairs	DB Fernverkehr	Intercity 2
RE 1	Norddeich Mole – Norden – Emden – Leer – Oldenburg – Delmenhorst – Bremen – Nienburg – Hannover	Two hours	DB Regio Nord	
