= Leschede station =

Railway station in Emsbüren, Lower Saxony, Germany

Leschede

General information
- Location: Emsbüren, Lower Saxony, Germany
- Coordinates: 52°23′51″N 7°18′22″E
- Line: Emsland Railway
- Platforms: 2
- Tracks: 3

Other information
- Fare zone: VGE: Leschede (buses only)

Services
Preceding station		Following station
Lingen (Ems) towards Emden Hbf	RE 15	Salzbergen towards Münster Hbf
Location

Leschede is a railway station located in Emsbüren, Lower Saxony, Germany. The station lies on the Emsland Railway (Rheine - Norddeich) and the train services are operated by WestfalenBahn. The station was modernised with new platforms during 2012.

== Train services ==
The following services currently call at Leschede:

Line	Route	Interval	Operator	Rolling stock
RE 15	Emden Außenhafen – Emden – Leer – Papenburg – Meppen – Lingen – Leschede – Rheine – Münster	60 min	WestfalenBahn	Stadler FLIRT 3
