= Salzbergen station =

Railway station in Salzbergen, Germany

Salzbergen
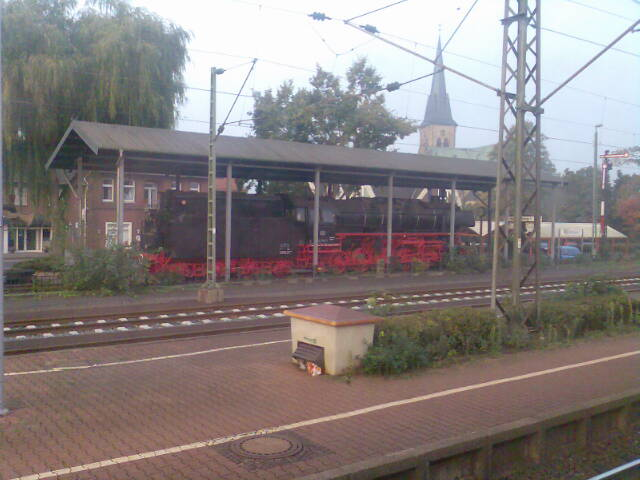
- Last Deutsche Bundesbahn steam locomotive, decommissioned in 1977, displayed at the station

General information
- Location: Salzbergen, Lower Saxony; Germany
- Coordinates: 52°19′22″N 7°21′06″E
- Lines: Almelo–Salzbergen railway; Emsland Railway

Other information
- Station code: 5476
- DS100 code: HSAL
- Category: 5
- Fare zone: VGE: Salzbergen (buses only)
- Website: www.bahnhof.de

Services
Preceding station		Following station
Leschede towards Emden Hbf	RE 15	Rheine towards Münster Hbf
Preceding station		Following station
Schüttorf towards Hengelo	RB 61	Rheine towards Bielefeld Hbf
Location

Salzbergen is a railway station in Salzbergen, Germany. It is on the Almelo–Salzbergen and Emsland lines (Rheine - Norddeich). The train services are operated by WestfalenBahn.

== Train services ==
The following services currently call at Salzbergen:

Line	Route	Interval	Operator	Rolling stock
RE 15	Emden Außenhafen – Emden – Leer – Papenburg – Meppen – Lingen – Salzbergen – Rheine – Münster	60 min	WestfalenBahn	Stadler FLIRT 3
RB 61	Hengelo – Bad Bentheim – Salzbergen – Rheine – Ibbenbüren – Osnabrück – Herford – Bielefeld	60 min	Eurobahn	Stadler FLIRT 3

== Preserved locomotive ==
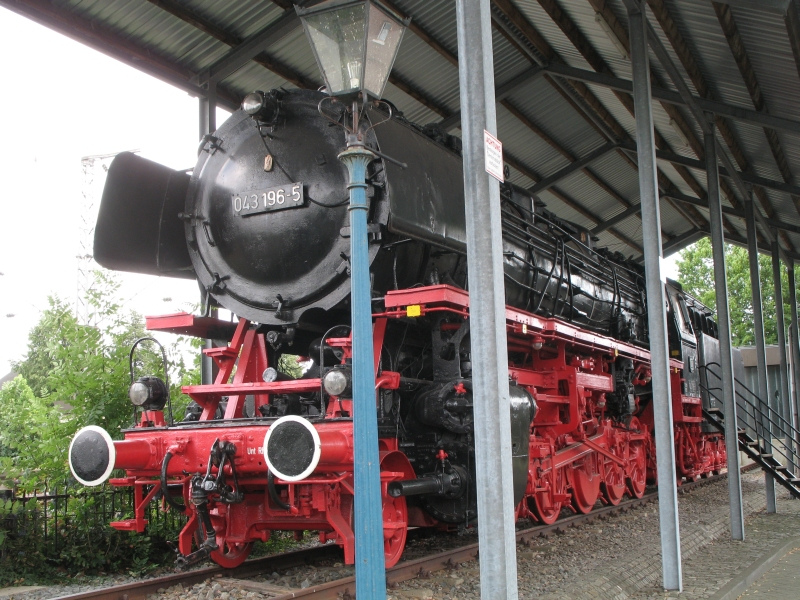
Preserved locomotive from the street

Steam Engine 043 196 is kept at Salzbergen station.

== See also ==
- 043 196 at Salzbergen
- WestfalenBahn at Salzbergen
- DB Class 111 at Salzbergen
