= Dörpen station =

Railway station in Dörpen, Germany

Dörpen
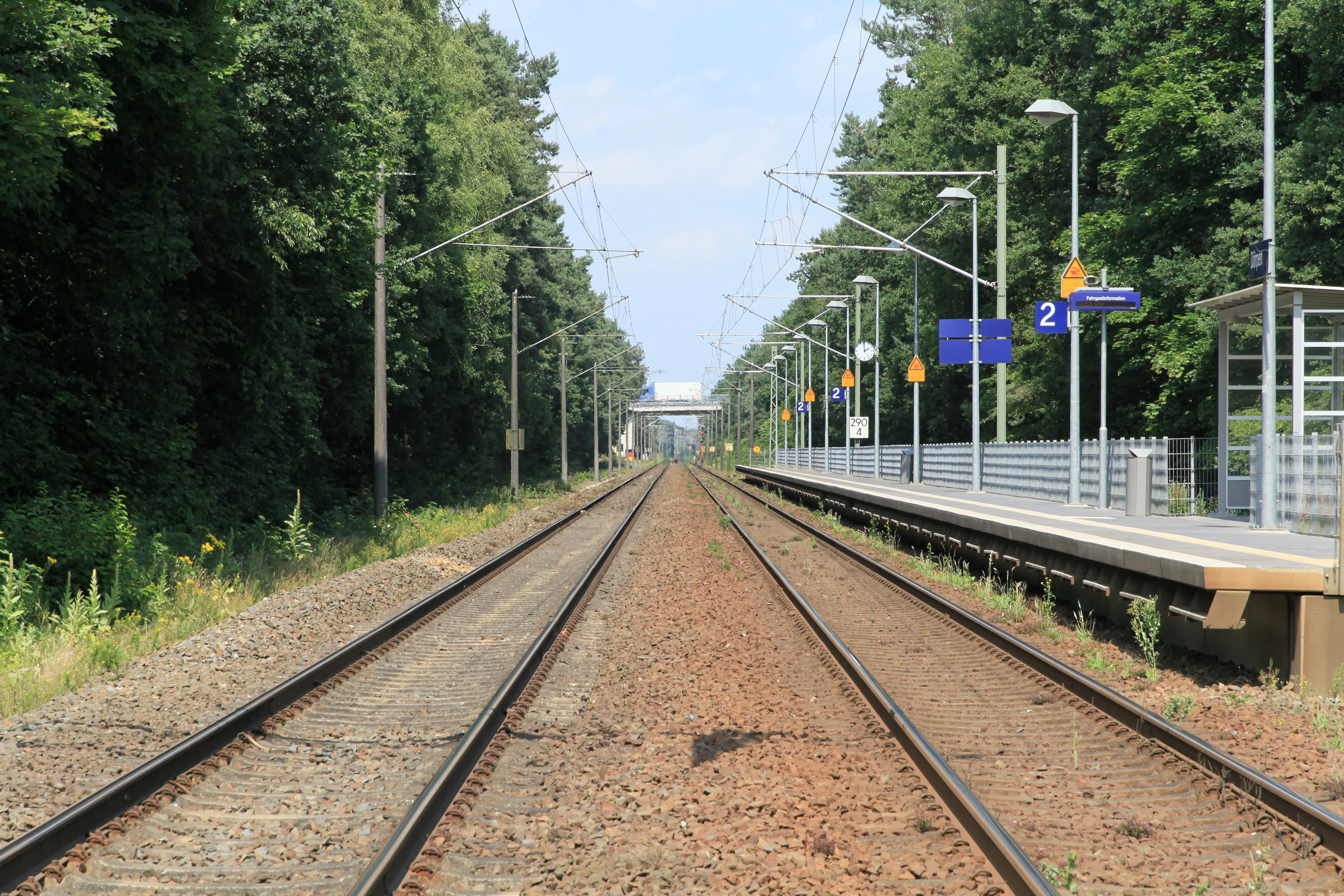
- Dörpen railway station

General information
- Location: Dörpen, Lower Saxony; Germany
- Coordinates: 52°58′12″N 7°21′17″E
- Line: Emsland Railway

Services
Preceding station		Following station
Aschendorf towards Emden Hbf	RE 15	Lathen towards Münster Hbf
Location

Dörpen is a railway station located in Dörpen, Lower Saxony, Germany. The station lies on the Emsland Railway (Rheine - Norddeich) and the train services are operated by WestfalenBahn.

== Train services ==
The station is served by the following service(s):

Line	Route	Interval	Operator	Rolling stock
RE 15	Emden Außenhafen – Dörpen – Meppen – Lingen – Rheine – Münster	60 min	WestfalenBahn	Stadler FLIRT 3
