= Lathen station =

Railway station in Lathen, Germany

Lathen
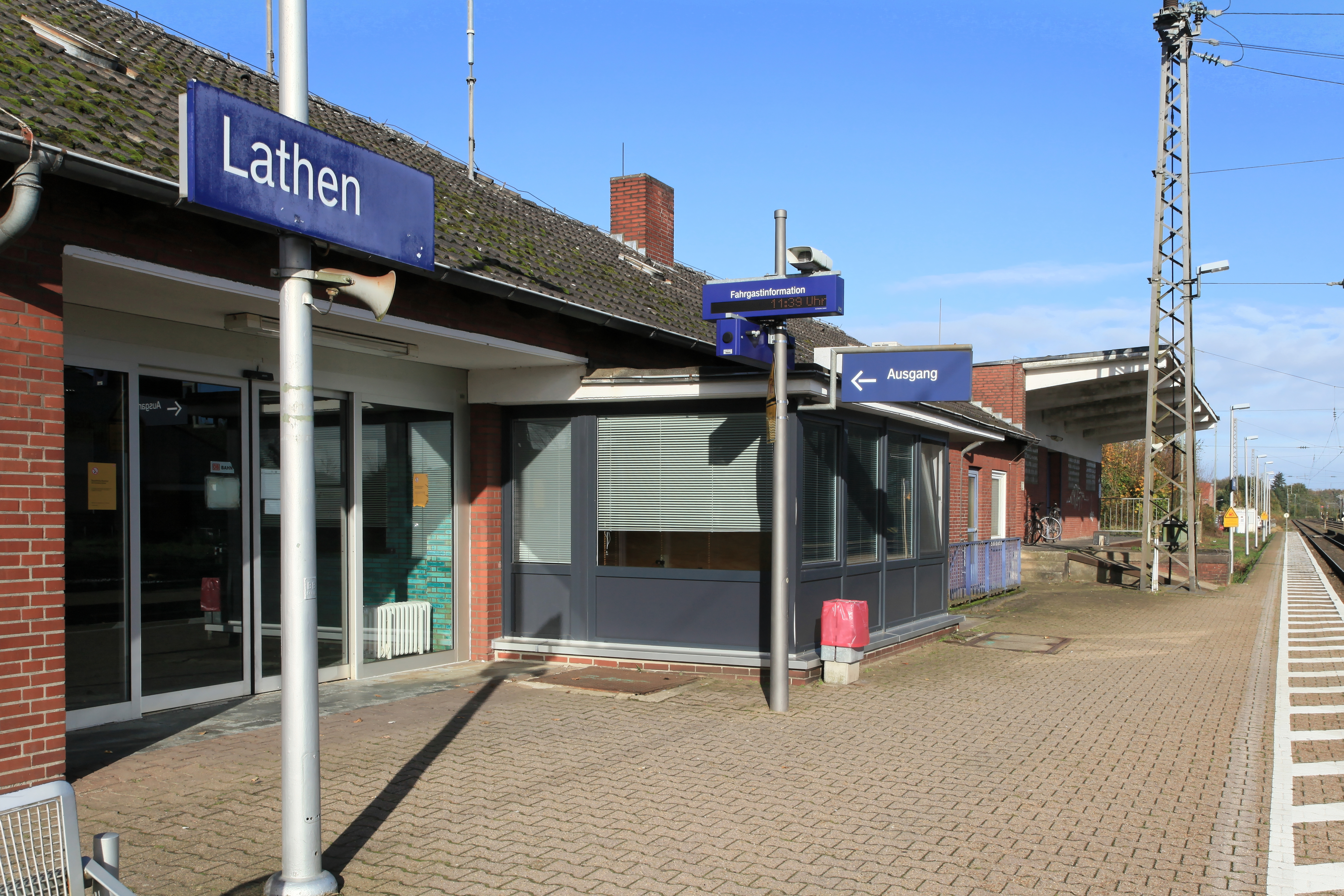
- Lathen railway station

General information
- Location: Lathen, Lower Saxony, Germany
- Coordinates: 52°51′38″N 7°19′23″E
- Line: Emsland Railway

History
- Opened: 1856

Services
| Preceding station | | Following station |
|---|---|---|
| Dörpen towards Emden Hbf | RE 15 | Haren (Ems) towards Münster Hbf |
Location

Lathen is a railway station located in Lathen, Lower Saxony, Germany. The station lies on the Emsland Railway (Rheine - Norddeich) and the train services are operated by WestfalenBahn. Lathen is also the location of the Transrapid Maglev train track.

== Train services ==
The station is served by the following service(s):

| Line | Route | Interval | Operator | Rolling stock |
|---|---|---|---|---|
| RE 15 | Emden Außenhafen – Dörpen – Meppen – Lingen – Rheine – Münster | 60 min | WestfalenBahn | Stadler FLIRT 3 |
