= List of Intercity-Express railway stations =

Line	Direction between
10	Berlin, Hanover and Düsseldorf/Cologne
11	Berlin, Mannheim and Munich
12	Berlin, Kassel and Basel
20	Hamburg, Kassel and Basel
22	Hamburg, Kassel and Stuttgart
25	Hamburg/Bremen, Nuremberg and Munich
28	Hamburg, Berlin and Munich
31	Hamburg, Cologne and Nuremberg/Basel
41	Essen, Nuremberg and Munich
42	Dortmund, Mannheim and Munich
43	Cologne, Mannheim and Basel
45	(Cologne, Wiesbaden and Mainz)
47	(Dortmund and Stuttgart)
48	Hamburg/Berlin, Cologne and Munich
49	(Cologne and Frankfurt)
50	Dresden, Frankfurt and Wiesbaden
75	(Copenhagen, Hamburg and Berlin)
76	(Aarhus, Hamburg and Berlin)
78	Amsterdam, Cologne and Frankfurt
79	(Brussels, Cologne and Frankfurt)
80	Paris, Brussels, Cologne and Essen (Thalys)
81	Paris and Freiburg im Breisgau (TGV)
82	(Paris, Mannheim and Frankfurt)
83	Paris, Strasbourg and Stuttgart (TGV)
84	Frankfurt, Strasbourg and Marseille (TGV)
87	Stuttgart and Zurich (currently operated by InterCity trains of the SBB)
90	(Munich, Salzburg and Vienna)
91	(Dortmund), Frankfurt and Vienna
	(…) = only few trains daily

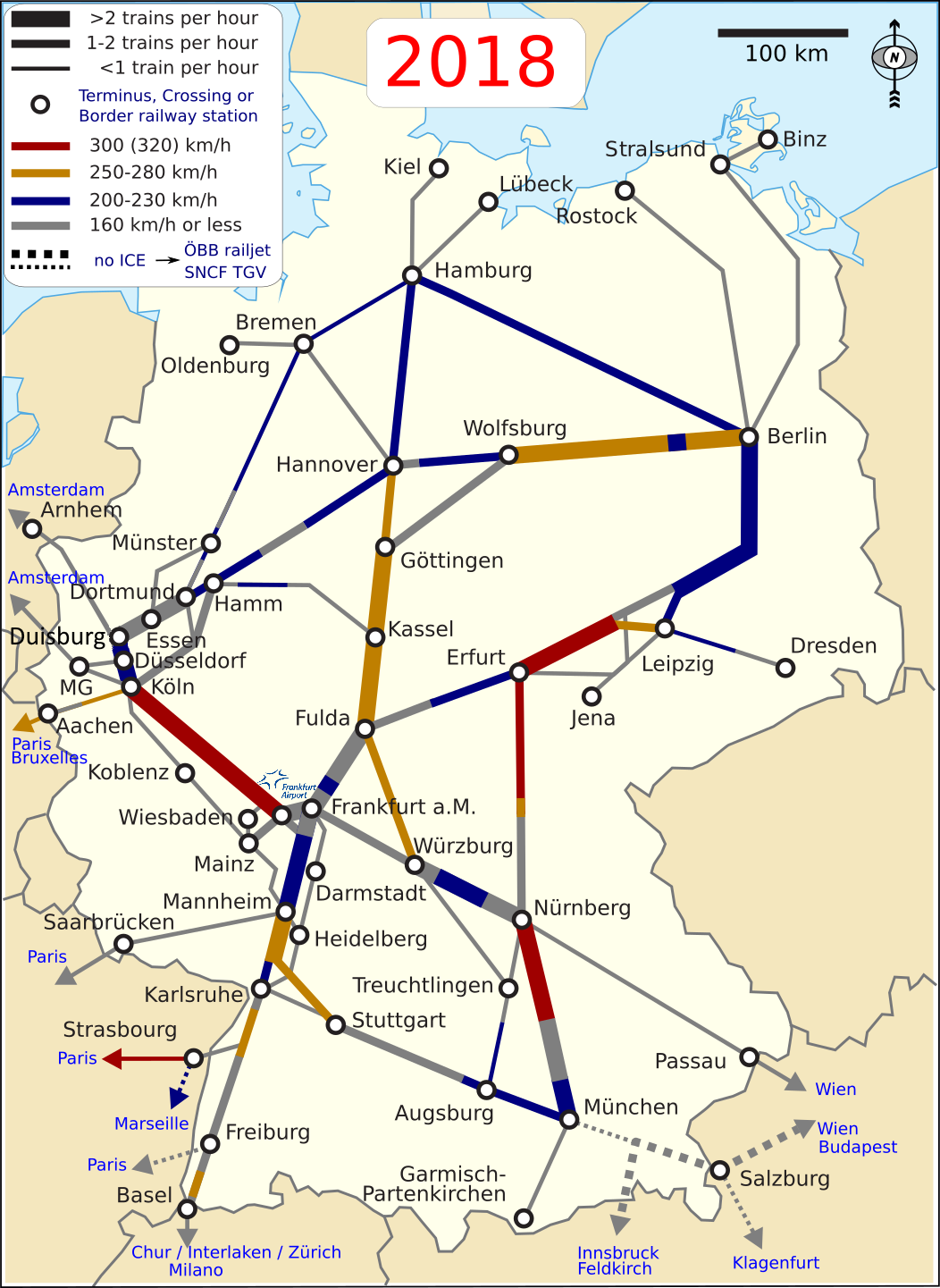
Frequency of trains and allowed max speed on the German Intercity-Express (ICE) network (2017/18)

This is a list of all the Intercity Express stations in Europe.

== Germany ==
From the Deutsche Bahn, the Nederlandse Spoorwegen and the SNCF operating high-speed trains with stops in several cities:

=== Baden-Württemberg ===
City	Station	stop every 1h	stop every 2h	few trains daily
Baden-Baden	Baden-Baden		20	31, 84
Biberach	Biberach (Riß)			-
Bruchsal	Bruchsal			31
Donaueschingen	Donaueschingen			26
Freiburg im Breisgau	Freiburg (Breisgau) Hbf		12, 20, 43	31, 81, TGV
Friedrichshafen	Friedrichshafen Stadt			32
Heidelberg	Heidelberg Hbf			22, 31, 87
Karlsruhe	Karlsruhe Hbf		12, 20, 43	31, 83, 84
Karlsruhe	Karlsruhe-Durlach			26
Konstanz	Konstanz			26
Lahr/Schwarzwald	Lahr (Schwarzw)			60, TGV
Mannheim	Mannheim Hbf		11, 12, 20, 22, 42, 43	31, 47, 50, 82, 84
Müllheim im Markgräflerland	Müllheim im Markgräflerland			60
Offenburg	Offenburg		12, 43	31
Radolfzell	Radolfzell			26
Ravensburg	Ravensburg			32
Ringsheim	Ringsheim/Europa-Park			85, TGV
Singen	Singen (Hohentw)		87	
St. Georgen im Schwarzwald	St. Georgen (Schwarzw)			26
Stuttgart	Stuttgart Hbf		11, 22, 42, 87	47, 83
Ulm	Ulm Hbf		11, 42	83
Vaihingen an der Enz	Vaihingen (Enz)			22
Villingen-Schwenningen	Villingen (Schwarzw)			26
Weil am Rhein	Weil am Rhein			60
Weinheim	Weinheim (Bergstraße) Hbf		26, 62	
=== Bavaria ===
City	Station	stop every 1h	stop every 2h	few trains daily
Aschaffenburg	Aschaffenburg Hbf	41		31, 91
Ansbach	Ansbach			24
Augsburg	Augsburg Hbf		11, 28, 42	25, 83
Bad Endorf	Bad Endorf			62
Bamberg	Bamberg		28	
Coburg	Coburg			-
Donauwörth	Donauwörth			28
Erlangen	Erlangen		28	
Freilassing	Freilassing		62	-
Garmisch-Partenkirchen	Garmisch-Partenkirchen			25, 28, 41
Günzburg	Günzburg		48	11, 42, 60
Ingolstadt	Ingolstadt Hbf	25	28	31, 41
Lichtenfels	Lichtenfels		28	
Lindau (Bodensee)	Lindau-Reutin		88	32
Murnau am Staffelsee	Murnau			28, 41
Munich	Munich Hbf (main station)	25, 28, 41	11, 42	31, 83, 90
Munich	Munich-Pasing		11, 42	25, 28
Munich	Munich East			62, 89
Neu-Ulm	Neu-Ulm			60
Nuremberg	Nuremberg Hbf	25, 28, 41	91	31
Passau	Passau Hbf		91	
Plattling	Plattling Bf		91	
Prien am Chiemsee	Prien am Chiemsee			
Regensburg	Regensburg Hbf		91	31
Rosenheim	Rosenheim		62, 89	24
Straubing	Straubing			39, 91
Traunstein	Traunstein		62	24
Treuchtlingen	Treuchtlingen			28
Tutzing	Tutzing			28, 41
Weilheim in Oberbayern	Weilheim (Oberbay)			28, 41
Würzburg	Würzburg Hbf	25, 41	91	31
=== Berlin and Brandenburg ===
City	Station	stop every 1h	stop every 2h	few trains daily
Angermünde	Angermünde			15, 21, 28
Berlin	Berlin Hbf (main station)	10, 28	11, 12	75, 76
Berlin	Berlin Gesundbrunnen			28
Berlin	Berlin Ostbahnhof (east station)	10	11, 12	75, 76
Berlin	Berlin Ostkreuz			9
Berlin	Berlin-Spandau	10, 28	11, 12	
Berlin	Berlin Südkreuz	28		
Berlin	Berlin-Wannsee			48
Berlin	Berlin Zoologischer Garten			9, 10, 12, 13, 19
Bernau bei Berlin	Bernau bei Berlin			15, 21, 28
Brandenburg	Brandenburg Hbf			48
Eberswalde	Eberswalde Hbf			15, 21, 28
Oranienburg	Oranienburg			17
Potsdam	Potsdam Hbf			43
Prenzlau	Prenzlau			15, 21, 28
Wittenberge	Wittenberge			28, 75, 76
=== Hesse ===
City	Station	stop every 1h	stop every 2h	few trains daily
Bad Hersfeld	Bad Hersfeld		50	
Bensheim	Bensheim		26, 62	
Darmstadt	Darmstadt Hbf		26, 62	
Frankfurt am Main	Frankfurt (Main) Hbf (main station)	41	11, 12, 20, 22, 50, 78, 91	31, 49, 79, 82, 84, 87
Frankfurt am Main	Frankfurt (Main) South		50	25
Frankfurt am Main	Frankfurt am Main Airport long distance train station	41, 50	22, 42, 43, 78	20, 31, 47, 49, 79, 91
Frankfurt am Main	Frankfurt am Main Airport regional station			41
Frankfurt am Main	Frankfurt (Main) West			
Friedberg	Friedberg (Hessen)		26	26
Fulda	Fulda	25, 50	11, 12	20
Gießen	Gießen		26	
Hanau	Hanau Hbf		11, 12, 91	31
Kassel	Kassel Wilhelmshöhe	25	11, 12, 20, 22	
Limburg an der Lahn	Limburg Süd		41	45, 49, 79
Marburg	Marburg (Lahn)		26	
Schwalmstadt	Treysa		26	
Wabern	Wabern		26	
Wiesbaden	Wiesbaden Hbf		50	20, 22, 45
=== Mecklenburg-Western Pomerania ===
City	Station	stop every 1h	stop every 2h	few trains daily
Anklam	Anklam			15, 21, 28
Bad Kleinen	Bad Kleinen			15
Bergen auf Rügen	Bergen auf Rügen			15, 21, 26, 28, 43
Binz	Ostseebad Binz			15, 21, 26, 28, 43
Bützow	Bützow			24, 26, 39
Greifswald	Greifswald			15, 21, 26, 28
Ludwigslust	Ludwigslust			28, 75, 76
Neustrelitz	Neustrelitz			11
Pasewalk	Pasewalk			15, 21, 28
Ribnitz-Damgarten	Ribnitz-Damgarten West			26, 39, 43
Rostock	Rostock Hbf			11, 17, 26, 39, 43
Rostock	Warnemünde			11, 17
Schwerin	Schwerin Hbf		26	39, 43
Stralsund	Stralsund Hbf			15, 21, 26, 28, 39, 43
Velgast	Velgast			26, 39, 43
Waren (Müritz)	Waren (Müritz)			28
Züssow	Züssow			15, 21, 28
=== Lower Saxony and Bremen ===
City	Station	stop every 1h	stop every 2h	few trains daily
Bad Bevensen	Bad Bevensen			26
Brunswick	Brunswick Hbf		11, 12	
Bremen	Bremen Hbf		25	10, 22, 31, 42
Celle	Celle			25
Delmenhorst	Delmenhorst			10
Diepholz	Diepholz			39, 48
Emden	Emden Hbf			47
Göttingen	Göttingen	25	11, 12, 20, 22	
Hannover	Hanover Hbf	10, 25	20, 22	11, 43
Hildesheim	Hildesheim Hbf		11, 12	
Langenhagen	Langenhagen-Mitte			26
Leer (Ostfriesland)	Leer (Ostfriesl)			47
Lingen (Ems)	Lingen (Ems)			47
Lüneburg	Lüneburg			20, 25
Meppen	Meppen			47
Nienburg/Weser	Nienburg (Weser)			10, 25
Norden	Norddeich Mole			47
Norden	Norden			47
Oldenburg (Oldenburg)	Oldenburg (Oldb) Hbf			10, 22, 25
Osnabrück	Osnabrück Hbf			31, 42
Papenburg	Papenburg			47
Uelzen	Uelzen			25
Verden	Verden			10, 25
Wolfsburg	Wolfsburg Hbf		10, 12	
=== North Rhine-Westphalia ===
City	Station	stop every 1h	stop every 2h	few trains daily
Aachen	Aachen Hbf		80	79, 10
Altenbeken	Altenbeken			19
Bielefeld	Bielefeld Hbf	10		43
Bochum	Bochum Hbf	10	42	31, 41, 43, 47, 91
Bonn	Bonn Hbf		10	31, 91
Cologne	Cologne Hbf (main station)	10	42, 43, 78, 80	31, 45, 49, 79, 91
Cologne	Cologne Messe/Deutz (trade fair)	41	10	43, 47, 78
Cologne	Cologne Bonn Airport		10	45, 47, 49
Dortmund	Dortmund Hbf	10	42	31, 41, 43, 47, 91
Düren	Düren			10
Düsseldorf	Düsseldorf Hbf (main station)	10, 41	42, 78	31, 43, 47, 80, 91
Düsseldorf	Düsseldorf Airport	10		80
Duisburg	Duisburg Hbf	10, 41	42, 78	31, 43, 47, 80, 91
Essen	Essen Hbf	10, 41	42	31, 43, 47, 80, 91
Gelsenkirchen	Gelsenkirchen Hbf			(...)
Gütersloh	Gütersloh Hbf			10, 43
Hagen	Hagen Hbf	10		31, 42, 43, 91
Hamm	Hamm (Westf)	10		43
Herford	Herford			10, 43
Minden	Minden (Westf)			10, 43
Münster (Westfalen)	Münster (Westf) Hbf			31, 42
Mülheim an der Ruhr	Mülheim (Ruhr) Hbf			10
Oberhausen	Oberhausen Hbf		78	43
Recklinghausen	Recklinghausen Hbf			(...)
Siegburg	Siegburg/Bonn		41, 42, 43	45, 49, 79
Solingen	Solingen Hbf former Solingen-Ohligs			42, 43, 91
Wuppertal	Wuppertal Hbf former Wuppertal-Elberfeld	10		31, 42, 43, 91
=== Rhineland-Palatinate and Saarland ===
City	Station	stop every 1h	stop every 2h	few trains daily
Andernach	Andernach			10
Bingen am Rhein	Bingen (Rhein) Hbf			31
Bullay	Bullay (DB)			10
Cochem (Mosel)	Cochem (Mosel)			10
Homburg (Saar)	Homburg (Saar) Hbf			50
Kaiserslautern	Kaiserslautern Hbf			50, 82
Koblenz	Koblenz Hbf			10, 31, 91
Mainz	Mainz Hbf		50	20, 22, 31, 45, 91
Montabaur	Montabaur		41	45, 49
Neustadt an der Weinstraße	Neustadt (Weinstr) Hbf			50
Saarbrücken	Saarbrücken Hbf			50, 82
Trier	Trier Hbf			10
Wittlich	Wittlich Hbf			10
Worms	Worms Hbf			11
=== Saxony ===
City	Station	stop every 1h	stop every 2h	few trains daily
Dresden	Dresden Hbf (main station)	50		
Dresden	Dresden-Neustadt	50		
Leipzig	Leipzig Hbf (main station)	28, 50		
Leipzig	Leipzig/Halle Airport			50
Riesa	Riesa	50		
=== Saxony-Anhalt ===
City	Station	stop every 1h	stop every 2h	few trains daily
Bitterfeld	Bitterfeld Bf			50
Halle (Saale)	Halle (Saale) Hbf			28, 50
Köthen	Köthen			50
Lutherstadt Wittenberg	Lutherstadt Wittenberg		28	
Magdeburg	Magdeburg Hbf			50
Naumburg (Saale)	Naumburg (Saale) Hbf		28	50
Stendal	Stendal			10
=== Schleswig-Holstein and Hamburg ===
City	Station	stop every 1h	stop every 2h	few trains daily
Büchen	Büchen			15, 26, 27, 28, 29
Hamburg	Hamburg Hbf (main station)	25	18, 22, 24, 26, 39, 42, 43	4, 11, 12, 15, 20, 27, 28, 29, 91
Hamburg	Hamburg-Altona	25	18, 22, 24, 26, 39, 42, 43	4, 11, 20, 28, 42, 91
Hamburg	Hamburg-Bergedorf			26
Hamburg	Hamburg Dammtor	25	18, 22, 24, 26, 39, 42, 43	4, 11, 20, 28, 42, 91
Hamburg	Hamburg-Harburg	25	39	11, 22, 24, 42, 89
Kiel	Kiel Hbf			20, 22, 28, 31
Lübeck	Lübeck Hbf			25, 75
Neumünster	Neumünster			25, 28, 31, 76
=== Thuringia ===
City	Station	stop every 1h	stop every 2h	few trains daily
Eisenach	Eisenach	50		28
Erfurt	Erfurt Hbf	50		28
Gotha	Gotha		50	28
Jena	Jena Paradies	28		
Saalfeld/Saale	Saalfeld (Saale)		28	
Weimar	Weimar	50		28

== Other countries ==
City	Station	stop every 1h	stop every 2h	few trains daily
=== Austria ===
Innsbruck	Innsbruck Hbf			11
Jenbach	Jenbach			11
Kufstein	Kufstein			11
Linz	Linz Hbf		91	90
Salzburg	Salzburg Hbf			90
St. Pölten	St. Pölten Hbf		91	90
Vienna	Flughafen Wien		91	
Vienna	Wien Hbf		91	90
Vienna	Wien Meidling		91	90
Vienna	Wien Westbf			90
Wels	Wels Hbf		91	
Wörgl	Wörgl Hbf			11
=== Benelux ===
Amsterdam (NL)	Amsterdam Centraal		78	43
Arnhem (Arnheim, NL)	Arnhem		78	43
Brussels (Brussel, Brüssel, B)	Bruxelles-Nord/Brussel-Noord			79
Brussels (Brussel, Brüssel, B)	Bruxelles-Midi/Brussel-Zuid		80	79
Liège (Luik, Lüttich, B)	Liège-Guillemins		80	79
Utrecht (NL)	Utrecht Centraal		78	43
=== France ===
City	Station	stop every 1h	stop every 2h	few trains daily
Aix-en-Provence	Aix-en-Provence TGV railway station			84
Avignon	Gare d'Avignon TGV			84
Belfort	Gare de Belfort – Montbéliard TGV			84
Besançon	Gare de Besançon Franche-Comté TGV			84
Chalon-sur-Saône	Gare de Chalon-sur-Saône			84
Forbach	Gare de Forbach			82
Lyon	Gare de Lyon-Part-Dieu			84
Marseille	Gare de Marseille-Saint-Charles			84
Mulhouse	Gare de Mulhouse			84
Paris	Paris Est			82, 83
Strasbourg	Gare de Strasbourg			83, 84
=== Switzerland ===
City	Station	stop every 1h	stop every 2h	few trains daily
Basel	Basel Bad Bf		12, 20, 43	31
Basel	Basel SBB		12, 20, 43	31, IC-Verkehr*
Bern	Bern HB			12, 20, IC-Verkehr*
Bülach	Bülach		87	
Interlaken	Interlaken Ost			12, 20
Interlaken	Interlaken West			12, 20
Liestal	Liestal			IC-Verkehr*
Olten	Olten			12, 20, IC-Verkehr*
Schaffhausen	Schaffhausen		87	
Spiez	Spiez			12, 20
Thun	Thun			12, 20
Zürich	Zürich HB		87	12, 20

* There are some ICE connections inside of Switzerland which are operated between Basel and Bern(–Interlaken) or Zurich.

== See also ==
- Intercity-Express
- List of Intercity-Express lines
