= Haren (Ems) station =

Railway station in Lower Saxony, Germany

Haren (Ems)

General information
- Location: Emmeln, Lower Saxony; Germany
- Coordinates: 52°47′06″N 7°18′04″E
- Line: Emsland Railway

Services
Preceding station		Following station
Lathen towards Emden Hbf	RE 15	Meppen towards Münster Hbf
Location

Haren (Ems) is a railway station located in Emmeln, near Haren, Lower Saxony, Germany. It lies on the Emsland Railway (Rheine - Norddeich) and is operated by WestfalenBahn.

== Regional service ==
The station is served by the following service(s):

Line	Route	Interval	Operator	Rolling stock
RE 15	Emden Außenhafen – Haren – Meppen – Lingen – Rheine – Münster	60 min	WestfalenBahn	Stadler FLIRT 3

== History ==
The railway station Haren (Ems) was built by the Royal Hanoverian State Railways during the construction of the Emsland Railway and officially opened in 1856.

In March 2026, the town of Haren (Ems) adopted measures to upgrade the station, including plans to reopen the waiting hall.
