= Aschendorf station =

Railway station in Germany

Aschendorf
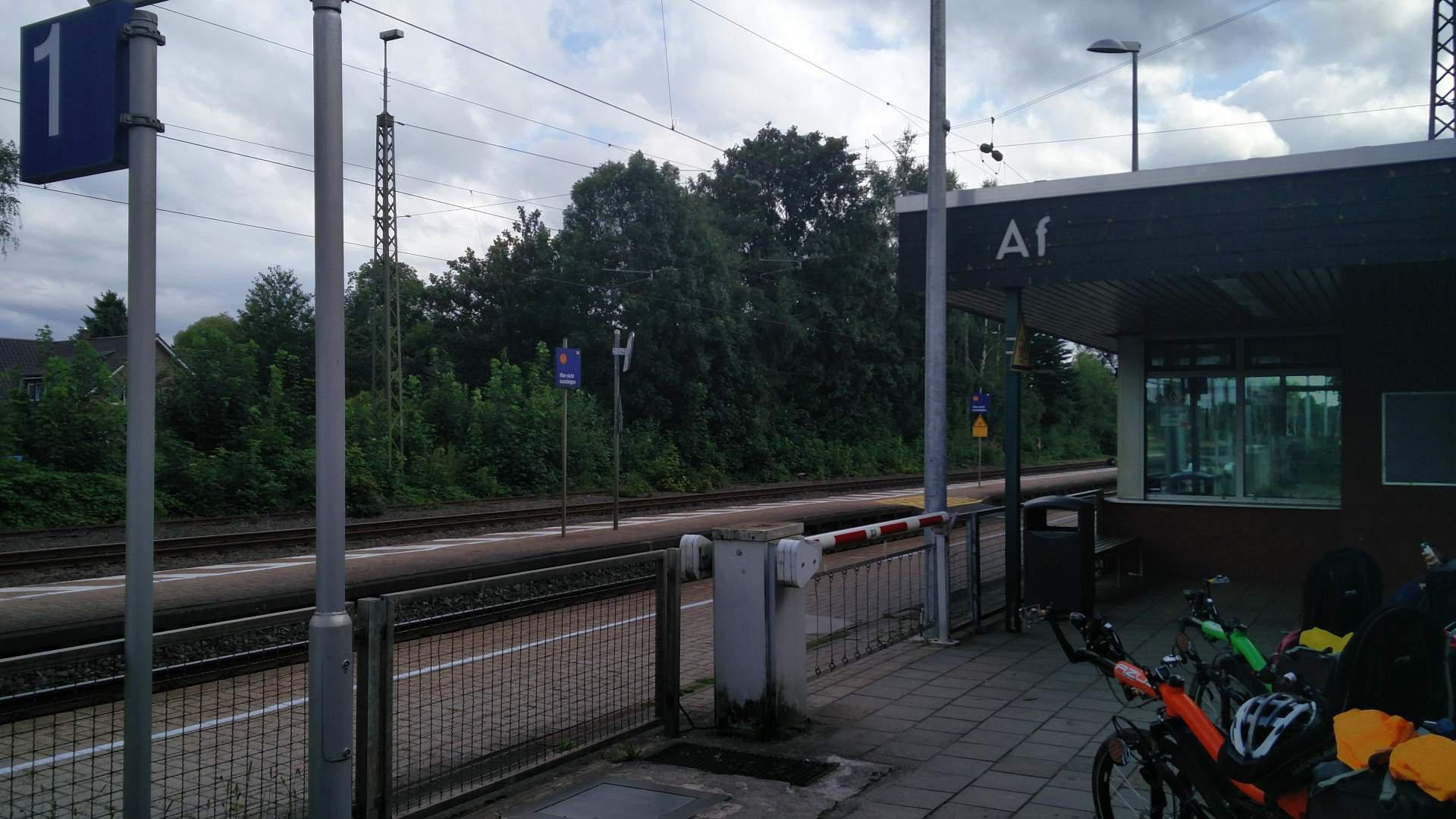
- The station in 2016

General information
- Location: Aschendorf, Lower Saxony
- Coordinates: 53°03′07″N 7°20′13″E
- Line: Emsland Railway

Other information
- Station code: 193
- DS100 code: HASD
- IBNR: 8000624
- Category: 6

Services
Preceding station		Following station
Papenburg towards Emden Hbf	RE 15	Dörpen towards Münster Hbf
Location

Aschendorf is a railway station located in Aschendorf, Lower Saxony, Germany. The station lies on the Emsland Railway (Rheine - Norddeich) and the train services are operated by WestfalenBahn.

== Train services ==
The station is served by the following service(s):

Line	Route	Interval	Operator	Rolling stock
RE 15	Emden Außenhafen – Aschendorf – Meppen – Lingen – Rheine – Münster	60 min	WestfalenBahn	Stadler FLIRT 3
