= Geeste station =

Railway station in Emsland, Germany

Geeste

General information
- Location: Geeste, Lower Saxony; Germany
- Coordinates: 52°35′57″N 7°18′45″E
- Line: Emsland Railway

History
- Opened: 1856

Services
Preceding station		Following station
Meppen towards Emden Hbf	RE 15	Lingen (Ems) towards Münster Hbf
Location

Geeste is a railway station located in the municipality Geeste, Lower Saxony, Germany, in the Ortsteil Osterbrock. The station was opened in 1856 and is located on the Emsland line (Rheine - Norddeich). The train services are operated by WestfalenBahn.

== Train services ==
The station is served by the following service(s):

Line	Route	Interval	Operator	Rolling stock
RE 15	Emden Außenhafen – Emden – Leer – Papenburg – Geeste – Lingen – Rheine – Münster	60 min	WestfalenBahn	Stadler FLIRT 3
