= Dieter Wolke =

Dieter Wolke (born 19 March 1957) is Professor of Developmental Psychology and Individual Differences at the University of Warwick, Department of Psychology, and at the Division of Health Sciences at Warwick Medical School since 2006. In 2020, he was named by the British Psychological Society for Distinguished Contributions to British Developmental Psychology award. He has also been named as a highly cited researcher, ranking in the top 1% of citations in Web of Science by Clarivate every year since 2018.

== Early life and education ==
Wolke was born in Aschendorf, Lower Saxony, as the youngest of three children. His parents were refugees during World War II from Pomerania (now Poland). He grew up in Papenburg and studied psychology with Philosophy, Anthropology and Physiology at Kiel University from 1976 to 1979 when he had a year abroad as a research student in the Thomas Coram Research Unit at the Institute of Education, London (UK) supported by the German Academic Exchange Service. From 1980 to 1982 he continued his post graduate studies at Kiel University and graduated with a Dipl-Psych degree. He earned his Doctorate of Philosophy as a part-time student from the University of London Faculty of Science (Institute of Education) in 1989.

== Career ==
Wolke has worked at different colleges of the University of London as research assistant (Institute of Education (1983–84); King's College Hospital London, (1984–85)) and then as Research Fellow and Honorary lecturer at the UCL Great Ormond Street Institute of Child Health in London (1985-1990). In 1990, he was appointed as Director of Psychology of the Bavarian Longitudinal Study (BLS) at the Dr von Haunersches Kinderspital of LMU Munich. He has been a Director of the ongoing BLS since then. In 1995, he was appointed as Professor of Psychology at the University of Hertfordshire, Department of Psychology, Hatfield (UK) and in 2002 as Professor in Lifespan Psychology at the University of Bristol Medical School and deputy director of the Avon Longitudinal Study of Parents and Children (ALSPAC). Before his appointment at the University of Warwick, he worked in the research funding sector (Scientific Director of the Jacobs Foundation, Zurich, 2004–2006) while holding Visiting Professorships at the University of Bristol and University of Zurich Institute of Psychology.

== Awards and honours ==
- 2022: Award of Honorary Doctorate (Doctor Psychologie Honoris Causa (Dr. h. c.) by the Faculty of Medicine, University of Helsinki in recognition of a distinguished and impactful contribution to Psychology.
- 2020: Distinguished Contribution to British Developmental Psychology (British Psychological Association, BPS).
- 2017: Elected as Fellow of the Association for Psychological Science (APS).
- 2014: Award of Honorary Doctorate in Natural Sciences (Doktor rerum naturalium honoris causa (Dr. rer. nat. h. c.) by Ruhr-University Bochum, Germany, awarded for contribution to psychological research.
- 2014: University of Warwick - Winner of Research Impact and Public Engagement Award - Faculty of Science: Research Impact (Established Career) Prenatal and Family Precursors of Bullying Involvement in Childhood and their Consequences into Early Adulthood.
- 2006: Award for Excellence in Research, MENSA Education & Research Foundation (www.mensafoundation.org) Prof. Marc Bornstein. For: Stability in cognition across early childhood - A developmental cascade.
