= Westerstede-Ocholt railway station =

Railway station in Germany

Westerstede-Ocholt
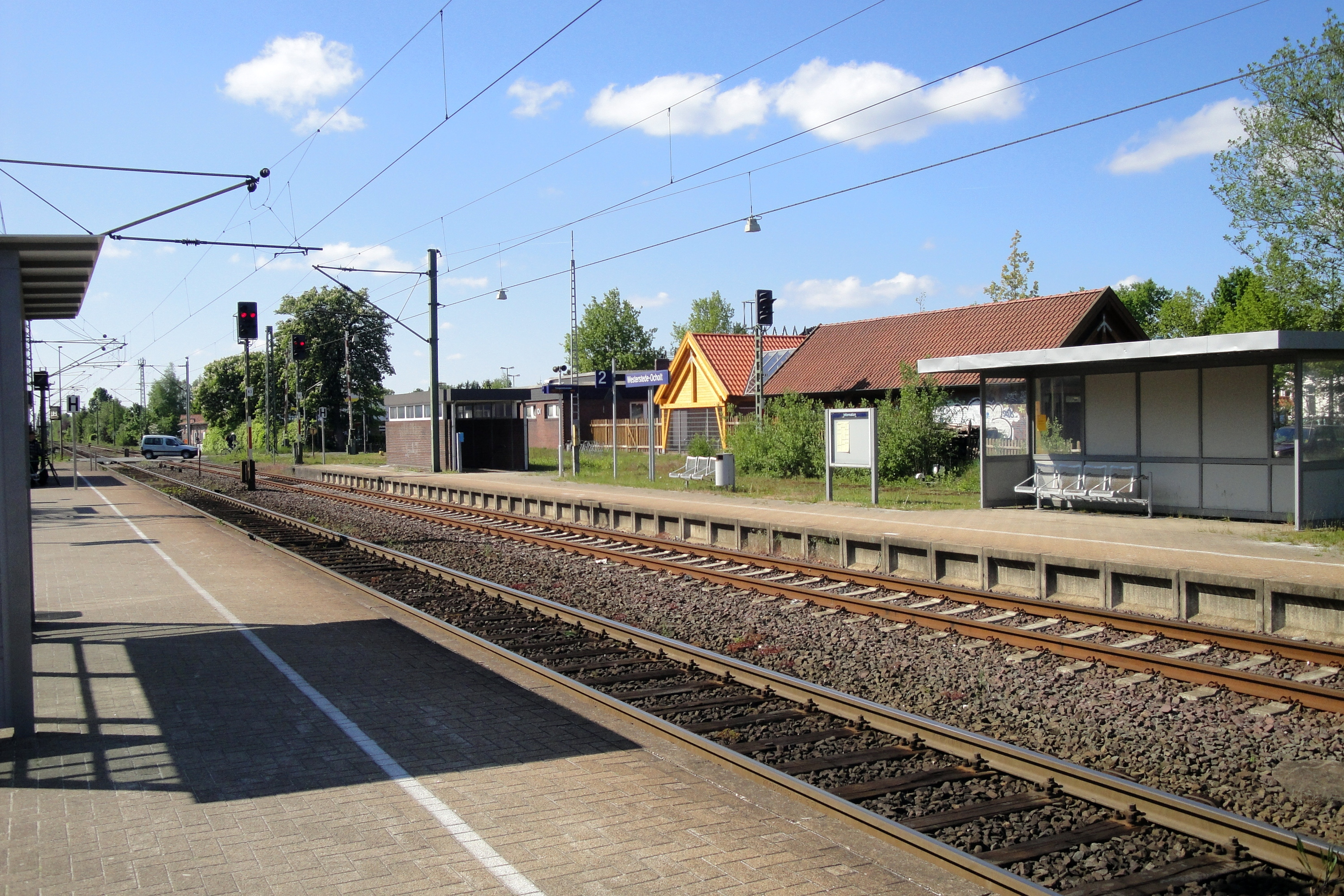
- Westerstede-Ocholt railway station

General information
- Location: Ocholt, Lower Saxony; Germany
- Coordinates: 53.202252°N 7.886314°E
- Platforms: 4

Other information
- Fare zone: VBN: 760
- Website: www.bahnhof.de

Services
Preceding station	DB Fernverkehr	Following station
Augustfehn towards Norddeich Mole	IC 56	Bad Zwischenahn towards Leipzig Hbf or Cottbus Hbf
Preceding station	DB Regio Nord	Following station
Augustfehn towards Norddeich Mole	RE 1	Bad Zwischenahn towards Hannover Hbf
Location

Westerstede-Ocholt (German: Bahnhof Westerstede-Ocholt) is a railway station located in Ocholt, Germany. The station is located on the Oldenburg–Leer railway. The train services are operated by Deutsche Bahn.

== Train services ==
The following services currently call at the station:

- Intercity services IC 56: Norddeich - Emden - Leer - Bremen - Hannover - Braunschweig - Magdeburg - Leipzig / Berlin - Cottbus
- Regional services RE 1: Norddeich - Emden - Oldenburg - Bremen - Nienburg - Hanover
