= Schüttorf railway station =

Railway station in Germany

Coordinates: 52°19′03″N 7°13′20″E

Schüttorf
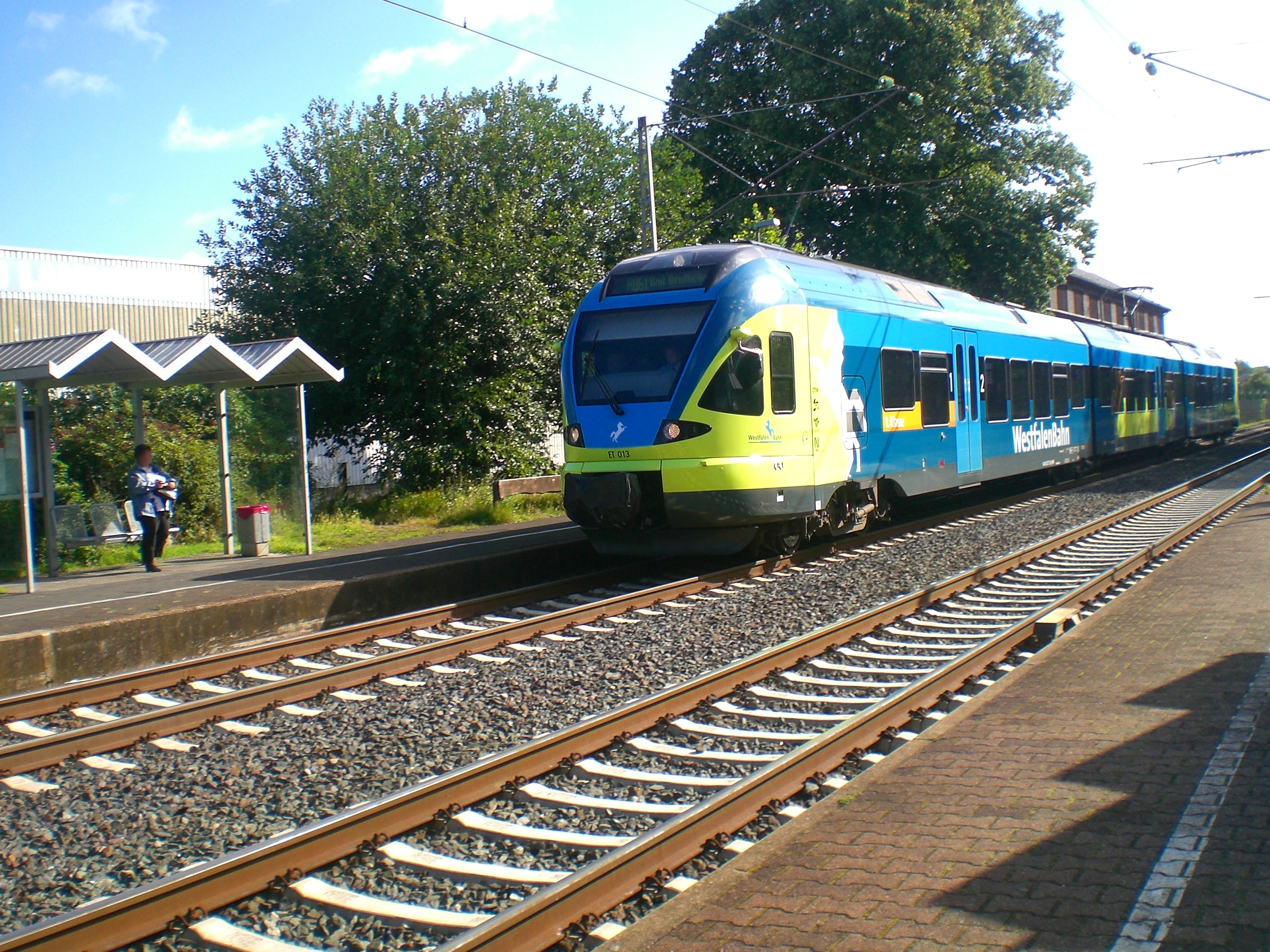
- A WestfalenBahn service at Schüttorf

General information
- Location: Schüttorf, Lower Saxony; Germany
- Line: Almelo-Salzbergen railway

Other information
- Station code: 5693
- DS100 code: ?
- Category: 6
- Fare zone: VGB: 105 (buses only); VGE: Schüttorf (VGB transitional tariff, buses only)
Location

Schüttorf is a railway station located in Schüttorf, Germany. The station is located on the Almelo - Salzbergen railway. The train services are operated by Eurobahn.

== Train services ==
The following services currently call at Schüttorf:

- Wiehengebirgs-Bahn Bad Bentheim - Rheine - Osnabrück - Herford - Bielefeld

Preceding station		Following station
Bad Bentheim towards Hengelo	RB 61	Salzbergen towards Bielefeld Hbf
