= Papenburg station =

Railway station in Papenburg, Lower Saxony, Germany

Papenburg (Ems)
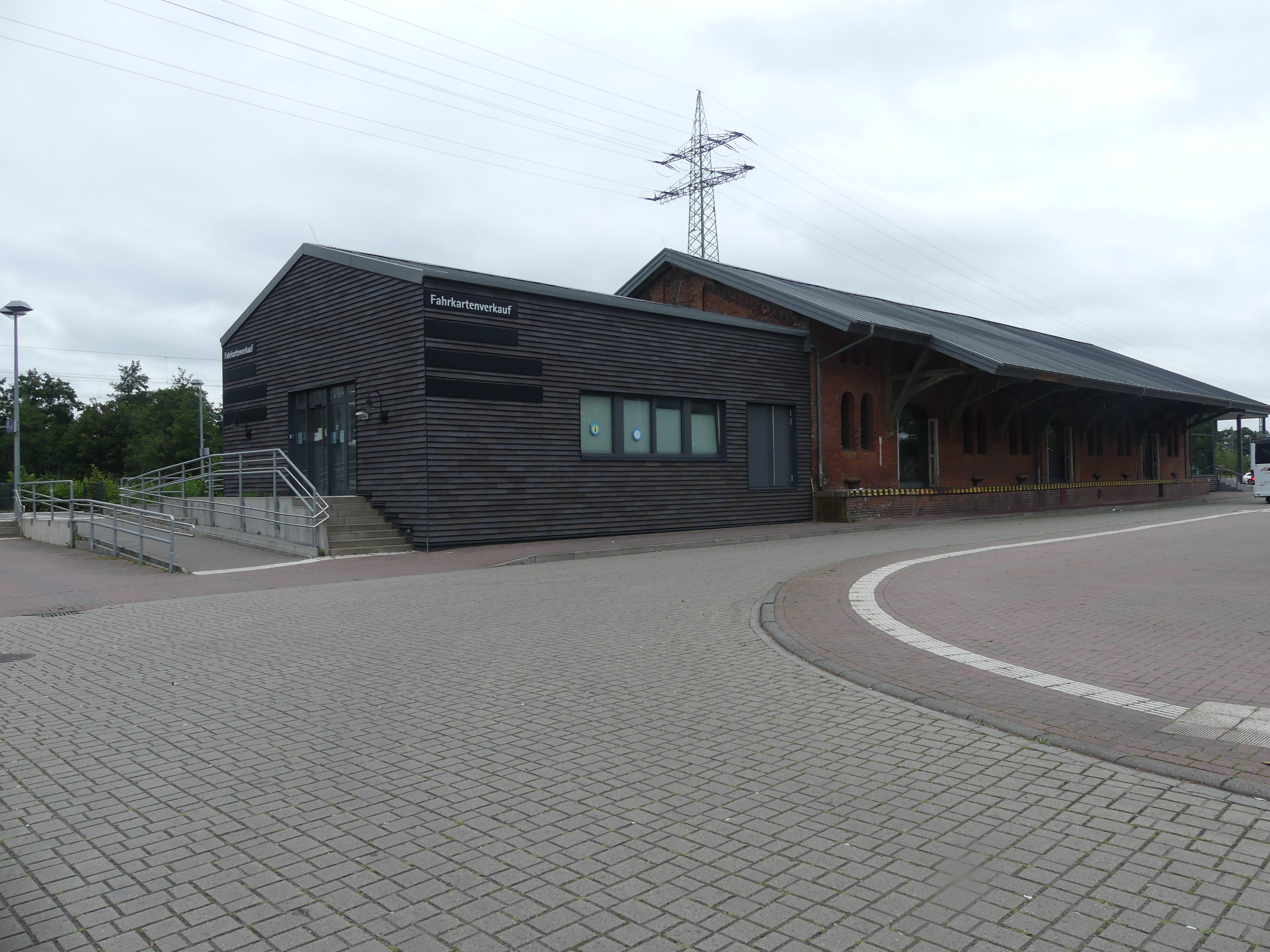
- Papenburg railway station 2023

General information
- Location: Papenburg, Lower Saxony, Germany
- Coordinates: 53°05′23″N 7°23′13″E
- Line: Emsland Railway
- Platforms: 3
- Tracks: 5

Construction
- Accessible: Yes

Other information
- Website: www.bahnhof.de

History
- Opened: 1854

Services
Preceding station	DB Fernverkehr	Following station
Leer towards Emden Außenhafen or Norddeich Mole	IC 35	Meppen towards Köln Hbf
Preceding station		Following station
Leer towards Emden Hbf	RE 15	Aschendorf towards Münster Hbf
Location

Papenburg (Ems) is a railway station located in Papenburg, Lower Saxony, Germany. The station lies on the Emsland Railway (Rheine - Norddeich) and the train services are operated by Deutsche Bahn and WestfalenBahn. In the 1850s the station was built as part of the Hannoversche Westbahn. The track between Papenburg and Emden was opened in 1854.

== Train services ==
In the 2026 timetable, the following services stop at the station:

Line	Route		Interval	Operator	Rolling stock
IC 35	Norddeich Mole – Norden –	Papenburg – Münster – Düsseldorf – Cologne	120 min	DB Fernverkehr	Intercity 2
IC 35	Emden Außenhafen –	Papenburg – Münster – Düsseldorf – Cologne	120 min	DB Fernverkehr	Intercity 2
RE 15	Emden Außenhafen – Papenburg – Leer – Papenburg – Meppen – Lingen – Rheine – Münster		60 min	WestfalenBahn	Stadler FLIRT 3
