= Emsbüren =

- Municipality
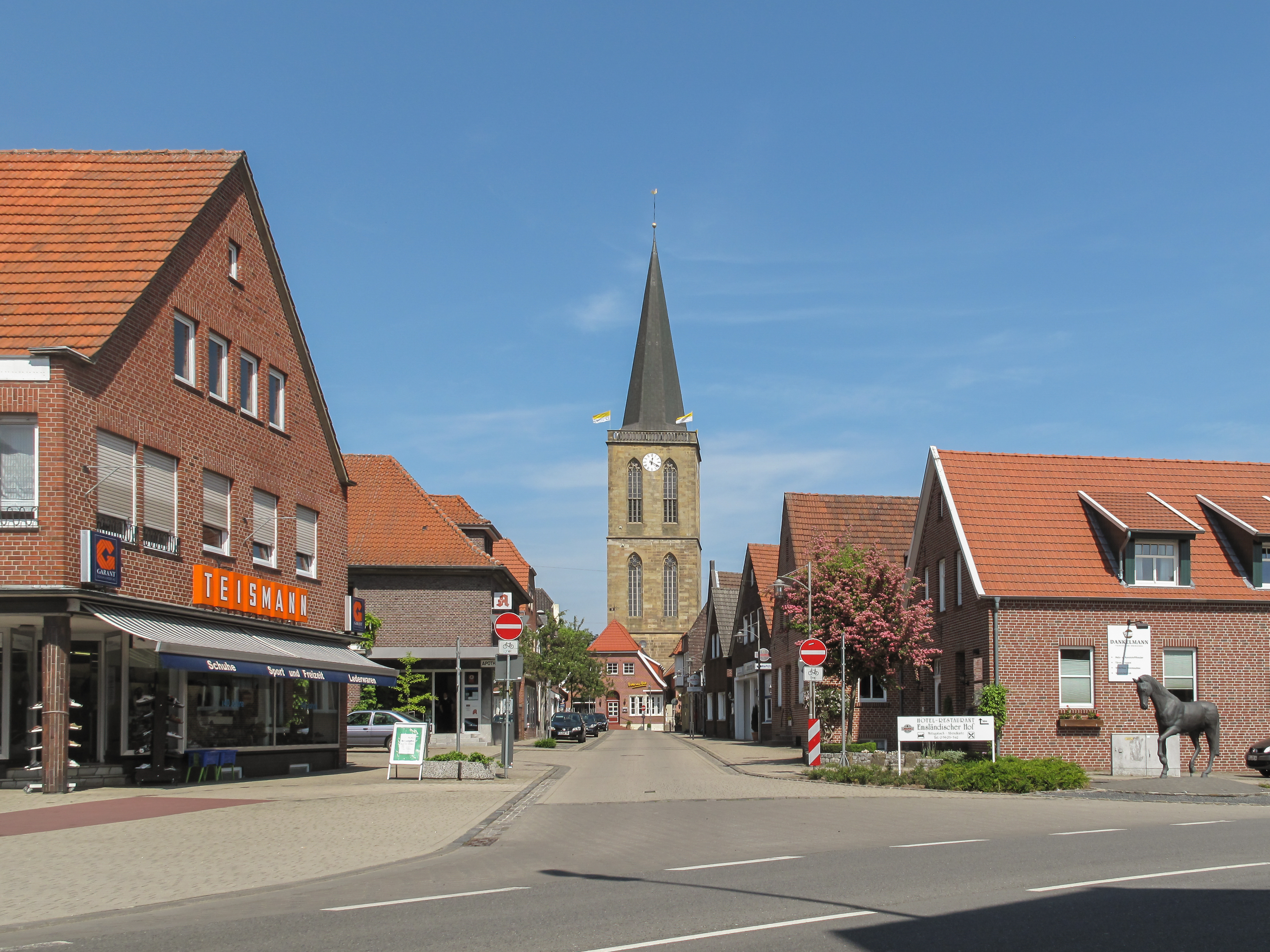
- Church of Saint Andrew

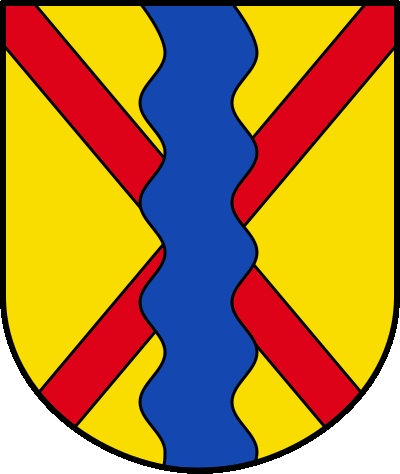
- Flag Coat of arms

- Location of Emsbüren within Emsland district
- Interactive map of Emsbüren
- Location within Germany Location within Lower Saxony
- Coordinates: 52°23′33″N 07°17′29″E
- Country: Germany
- State: Lower Saxony
- District: Emsland
- Subdivisions: 8 Ortsteile

Government
  - Mayor (2021–26): Markus Silies (CDU)

Area
  - Total: 139.31 km^{2} (53.79 sq mi)
- Elevation: 43 m (141 ft)

Population (2025-12-31)
  - Total: 10,544
  - Density: 75.687/km^{2} (196.03/sq mi)
- Time zone: UTC+01:00 (CET)
  - Summer (DST): UTC+02:00 (CEST)
- Postal codes: 48488
- Dialling codes: 05903
- Vehicle registration: EL
- Website: www.emsbueren.de

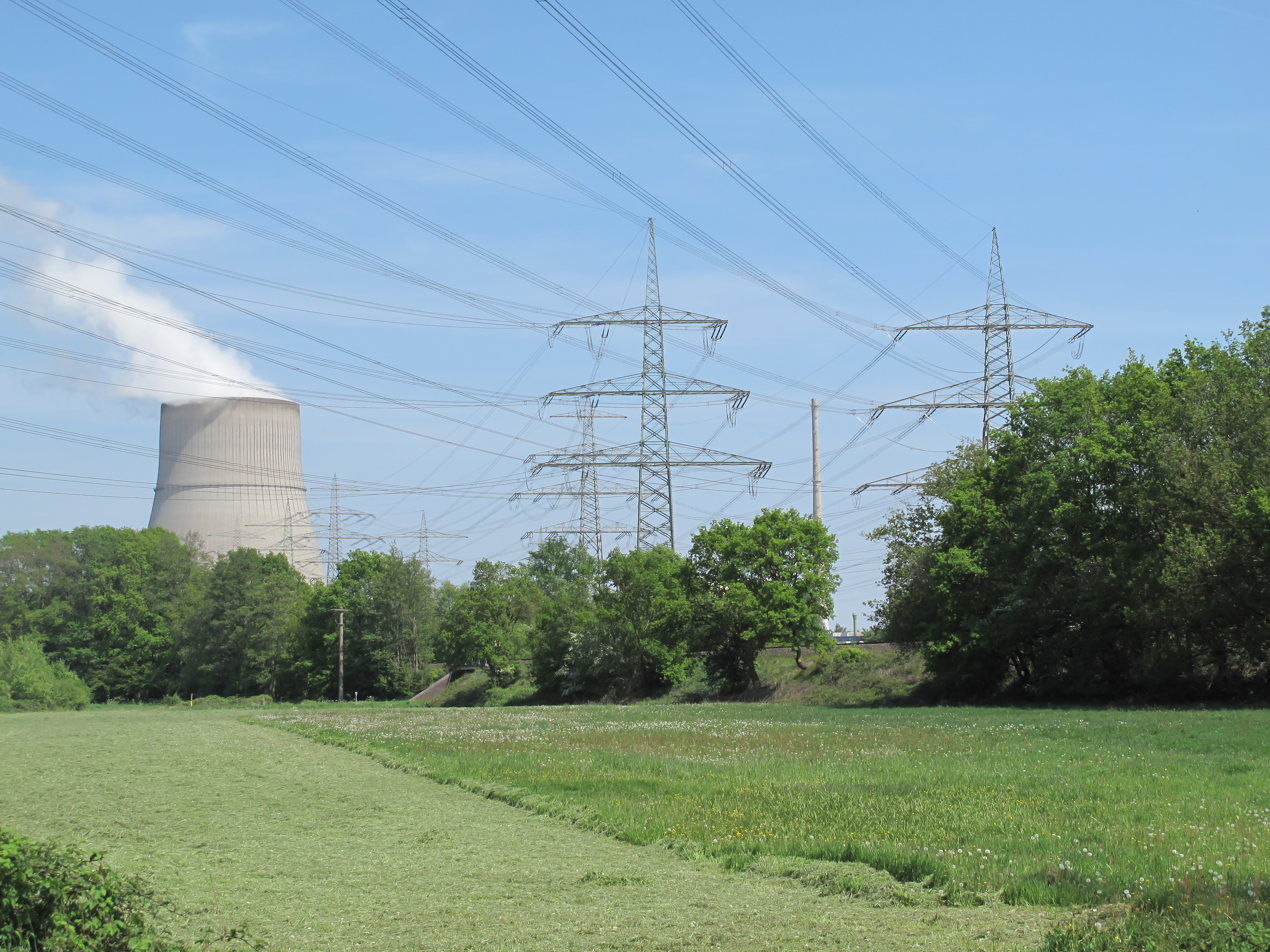
cooling tower of the Emsland Nuclear Power Plant, view from Elbergen

Emsbüren is a municipality in the Emsland district, Lower Saxony, Germany. It is situated on the river Ems, approx. 15 km south of Lingen, and 15 km northwest of Rheine.

It has a railway station: Leschede.

== Personalities ==
- Willi Heeks (1922-1996), German automobile racing driver
- René Tebbel (born 1969), German showjumper
