= Leer (Ostfriesland) railway station =

Railway station in Germany

Leer (Ostfriesland)
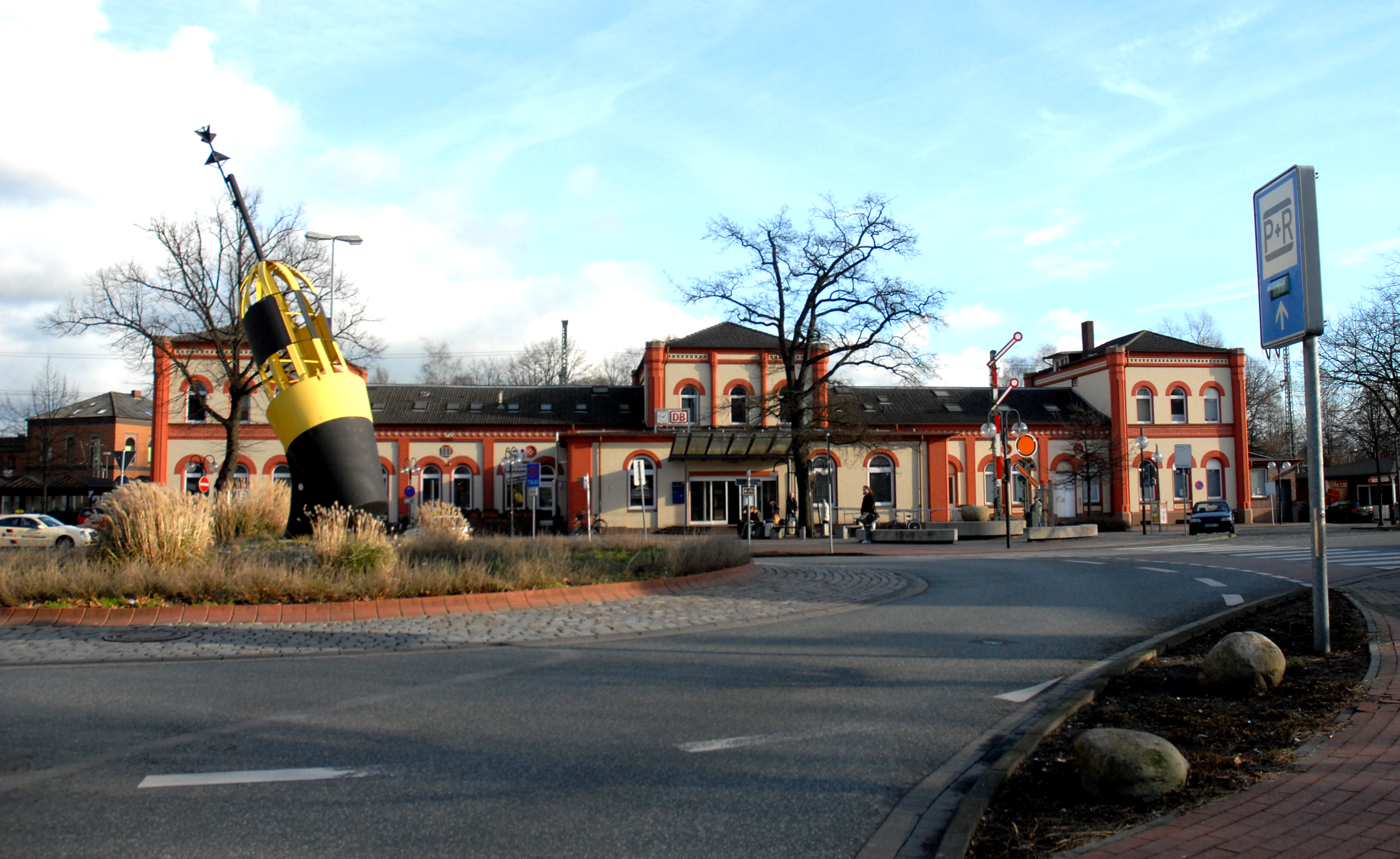
- Leer railway station in 2007

General information
- Location: Leer, Lower Saxony; Germany
- Coordinates: 53°13′52″N 7°27′55″E
- Lines: Emsland Railway; Oldenburg–Leer railway
- Platforms: 3
- Tracks: 5

Other information
- Website: www.bahnhof.de

History
- Opened: 20 June 1856

Services
Preceding station	DB Fernverkehr	Following station
Emden Hbf towards Norddeich Mole	IC 35	Papenburg towards Köln Hbf
Emden Hbf towards Norddeich Mole	IC 56	Augustfehn towards Leipzig Hbf or Cottbus Hbf
Preceding station	DB Regio Nord	Following station
Emden Hbf towards Norddeich Mole	RE 1	Augustfehn towards Hannover Hbf
Preceding station		Following station
Emden Hbf Terminus	RE 15	Papenburg towards Münster Hbf
Preceding station	Arriva Netherlands	Following station
Weener towards Groningen	Stoptrein 20100	Terminus
Location

Leer (Ostfriesland) (German pronunciation: [leːɐ̯ ʔɔstfʁiːslant]) is a railway station in the town of Leer in Lower Saxony, Germany. The railway station is situated on the Emsland Railway between the railway stations of Emden and Papenburg and it is the railway terminus on the Oldenburg–Leer railway after the railway station of Augustfehn. The train services are operated by Deutsche Bahn, WestfalenBahn and Arriva (a subsidiary of Deutsche Bahn).

== Train services ==
In the 2026 timetable, the following services stop at the station:

Line	Route			Interval	Operator	Rolling stock
IC 35	Norddeich Mole – Norden –	Emden – Leer – Münster – Düsseldorf – Cologne		120 min	DB Fernverkehr	Intercity 2
IC 35	Emden Außenhafen –	Emden – Leer – Münster – Düsseldorf – Cologne		120 min	DB Fernverkehr	Intercity 2
IC 56	Norddeich Mole – Norden –	Emden – Leer – Bremen – Hanover – Braunschweig – Magdeburg –	Leipzig	120 min	DB Fernverkehr	Intercity 2
IC 56	Emden Außenhafen –	Emden – Leer – Bremen – Hanover – Braunschweig – Magdeburg –	Potsdam – Berlin – Cottbus	120 min	DB Fernverkehr	Intercity 2
RE 1	Norddeich Mole – Norden – Emden – Leer – Oldenburg – Delmenhorst – Bremen – Nienburg – Hannover			120 min	DB Regio Nord	Traxx P160 AC1 (146.1/146.2) + 7 double deck stock
RE 15	Emden Außenhafen – Emden – Leer – Papenburg – Meppen – Lingen – Rheine – Münster			60 min	WestfalenBahn	Stadler FLIRT 3

The train service RB57 (Ihrhove–Nieuweschans railway) was replaced by buses since December 2015 until October 2026 due the damaged bridge (Friesenbrücke) over the Ems between Leer and Weener. Opening of the new bridge took place in 2026.

== Bus services ==
- 460: Leer - Holtland - Hesel - Aurich
- 467: Leer - Bagband - Strackholt - Ostgroßefehn - Wiesmoor
- 479: Leer - Holtland - Hesel - Neukamperfehn - Jheringsfehn
- 481: Leer - Moormerland - Timmel - Aurich
- 600: Leer - Ihrhove - Flachsmeer - Papenburg
- 604: Leer - Bunde - Verlaat - Ditzum
- 620: Leer - Weener - Bunde - Bad Nieuweschans
- 621: Leer - Neermoor/Warsingsfehn - Oldersum - Emden
- 622: Leer - Ihrhove - Papenburg
- 623: Leer - Augustfehn
- 624: Leer - Weener - Bunderhee - Kanalpolder
- 625: Leer - Remels - Westerstede
- 635: Leer - Wymeer
- 651: Bingum - Leerort - Blinke - Stadtmitte Leer - Logaer Weg - Logabirum (Leer Town Service)
- 656: Burlage - Ostrhauderfehn - Backemoor - Leer
- 661: Moormerland - Leer - Aurich
- 662: Jheringsfehn - Warsingsfehn - Leer
- 690: Burlage - Westrhauderfehn - Collinghorst - Leer
