= Augustfehn railway station =

Railway station in Germany

Augustfehn
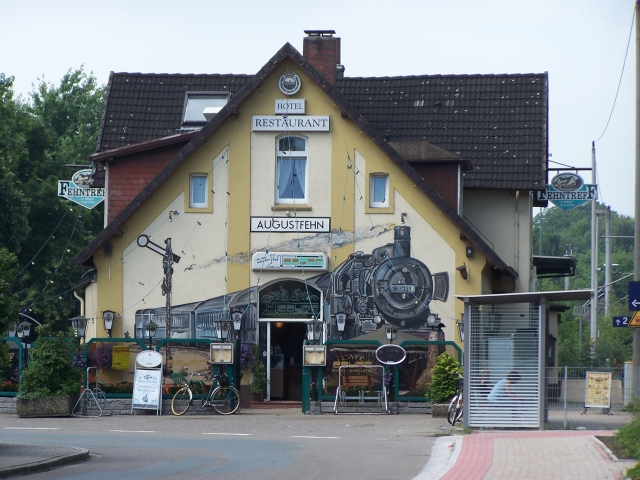
- Augustfehn railway station

General information
- Location: Augustfehn, Lower Saxony; Germany
- Coordinates: 53.22086°N 7.75917°E
- Line: Oldenburg–Leer railway
- Platforms: 2

Other information
- Fare zone: VBN: 770
- Website: www.bahnhof.de

Services
Preceding station	DB Fernverkehr	Following station
Leer towards Norddeich Mole	IC 56	Westerstede-Ocholt towards Leipzig Hbf or Cottbus Hbf
Preceding station	DB Regio Nord	Following station
Leer towards Norddeich Mole	RE 1	Westerstede-Ocholt towards Hannover Hbf
Location

Augustfehn (German: Bahnhof Augustfehn) is a railway station located in Augustfehn, Germany. The station is located on the Oldenburg–Leer railway. The train services are operated by Deutsche Bahn.

== Train services ==
The following services currently call at the station:

- Intercity services IC 56 Norddeich - Emden - Leer - Bremen - Hannover - Braunschweig - Magdeburg - Leipzig / Berlin - Cottbus
- Regional services RE 1 Norddeich - Emden - Oldenburg - Bremen - Nienburg - Hanover
