= Oldenburg–Leer railway =

Railway line in Germany

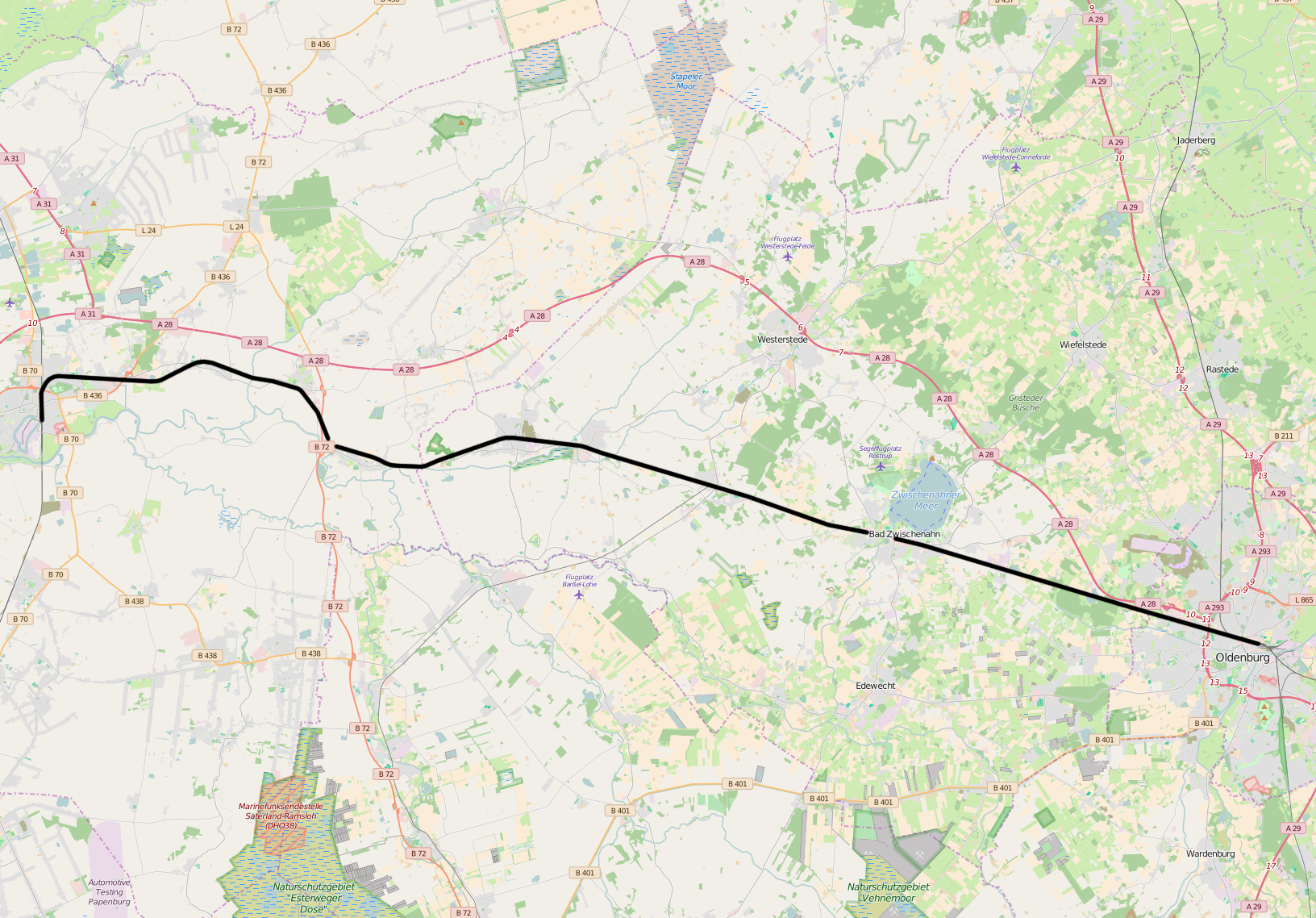

Overview
- Line number: 1520
- Locale: Lower Saxony, Germany

Service
- Route number: 390

Technical
- Line length: 55 km (34 mi)
- Track gauge: 1,435 mm (4 ft 8 1/2 in) standard gauge
- Electrification: 15 kV/16.7 Hz AC overhead catenary
- Operating speed: 120 km/h (74.6 mph) (maximum)

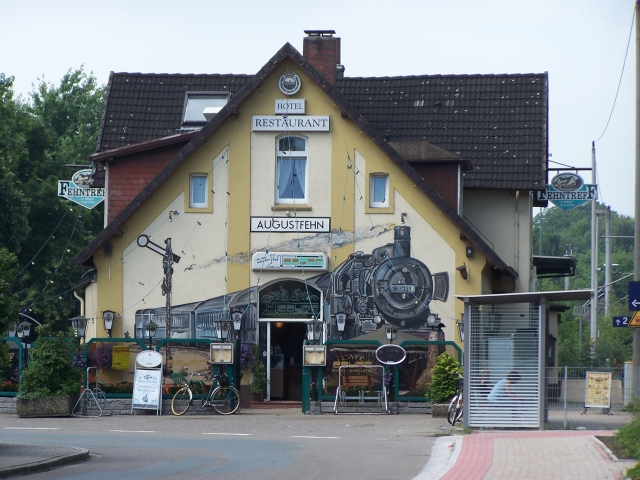
Augustfehn railway station

The Oldenburg–Leer railway is a 55 km (34 mi) single-track electrified main line in the north-west of the German state of Lower Saxony. It connects the Emsland line near Leer with the city of Oldenburg. Thus, it serves traffic from the direction of Hanover and Bremen to the port of Emden, the Emsland and western East Frisia, including the islands of Borkum, Juist and Norderney, which are important tourist destinations. Together with the Leer–Groningen line, it also has international significance.

The line was opened on 15 June 1869 by the Grand Duchy of Oldenburg State Railways and is one of the oldest railways in Germany. During 1992 it was electrified, which made expensive and time-consuming locomotive changes in Oldenburg unnecessary for the route to East Frisia.

In the 2013 timetable, daily InterCity services connect Leipzig or Berlin and Hanover with Emden and Norddeich Mole. Together with Regional-Express services, trains operate approximately hourly. Since mid-December 2010, an hourly service has been operated on the Oldenburg–Bad Zwischenahn route by the Bremen S-Bahn.

The Federal Transport Infrastructure Plan makes provision for the duplication of the line in the long term to improve freight links with ports, but no work has progress has been made on this proposal.
