= Meppen station =

Railway station in Meppen, Germany

Meppen
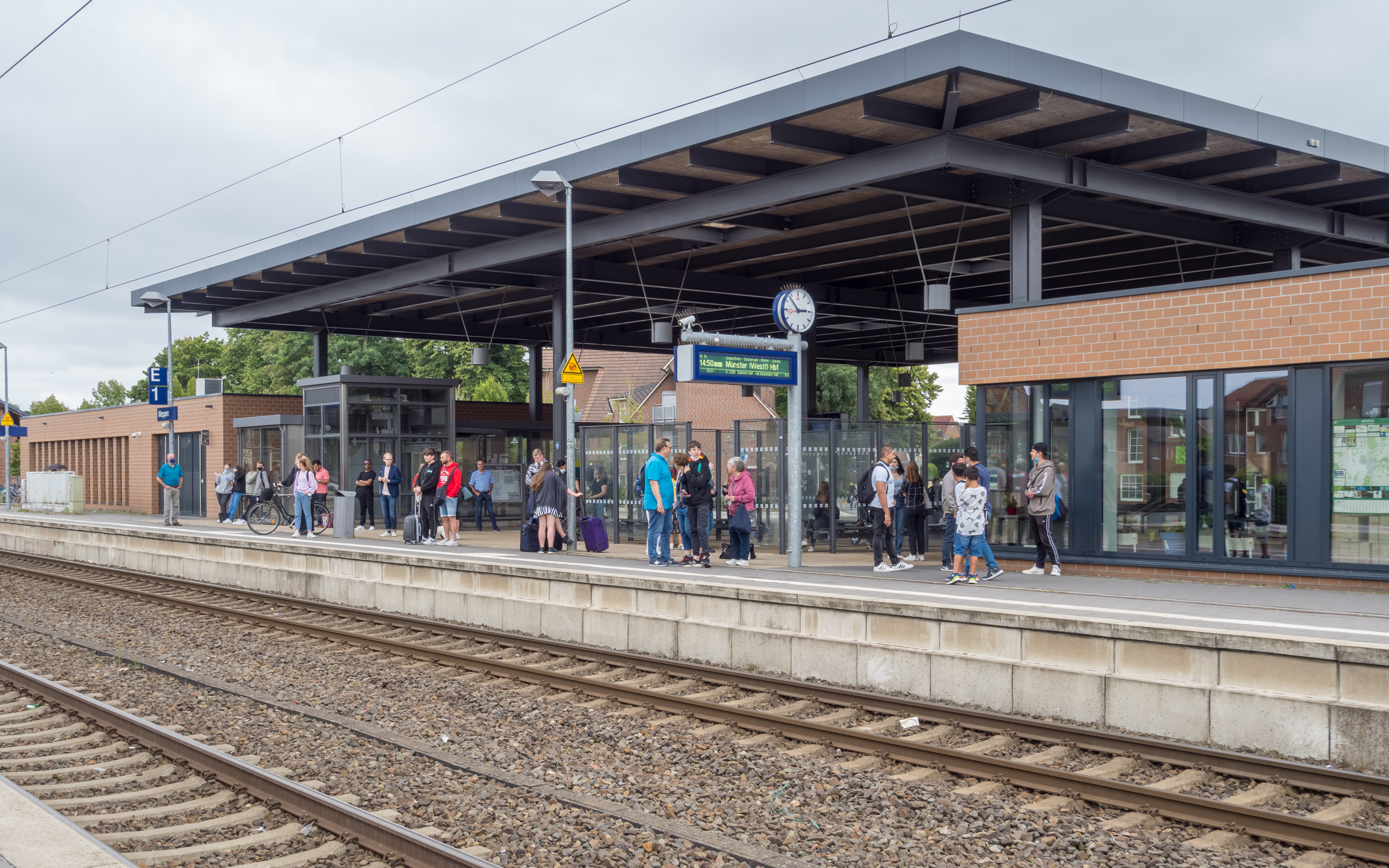
- 2022

General information
- Location: Bahnhofstraße 41; 49716 Meppen; Lower Saxony; Germany
- Coordinates: 52°41′45″N 7°17′56″E
- Owner: DB Netz
- Operator: DB Station&Service
- Lines: Emsland Railway (KBS 395); Meppen-Haselünner railway
- Platforms: 1 island platform 1 side platform
- Tracks: 5
- Train operators: DB Fernverkehr; WestfalenBahn

Construction
- Accessible: Yes

Other information
- Station code: 4061
- DS100 code: HMEP
- IBNR: 8003978
- Category: 4
- Fare zone: BVE: 1 (buses only); VGB: BVE (BVE transitional tariff, buses only)
- Website: www.bahnhof.de

History
- Opened: 1856; 170 years ago

Services
| Preceding station | DB Fernverkehr | Following station |
|---|---|---|
| Papenburg towards Emden Außenhafen or Norddeich Mole | IC 35 | Lingen (Ems) towards Köln Hbf |
| Preceding station | | Following station |
| Haren (Ems) towards Emden Hbf | RE 15 | Geeste towards Münster Hbf |
Location
- Location within Lower Saxony

Meppen is a railway station located in Meppen, Lower Saxony, Germany. The station lies on the Emsland Railway (Rheine - Norddeich) and the train services are operated by Deutsche Bahn and WestfalenBahn.

== Train services ==
In the 2026 timetable, the following services stop at the station:

| Line | Route | | Interval | Operator | Rolling stock |
|---|---|---|---|---|---|
| IC 35 | Norddeich Mole – Norden – | Emden – Meppen – Münster – Düsseldorf – Cologne | 120 min | DB Fernverkehr | Intercity 2 |
| IC 35 | Emden Außenhafen – | Emden – Meppen – Münster – Düsseldorf – Cologne | 120 min | DB Fernverkehr | Intercity 2 |
| RE 15 | Emden Außenhafen – Emden – Meppen – Lingen – Rheine – Münster | | 60 min | WestfalenBahn | Stadler FLIRT 3 |
