= Lingen (Ems) station =

Railway station in Lingen, Lower Saxony, Germany

Lingen (Ems)
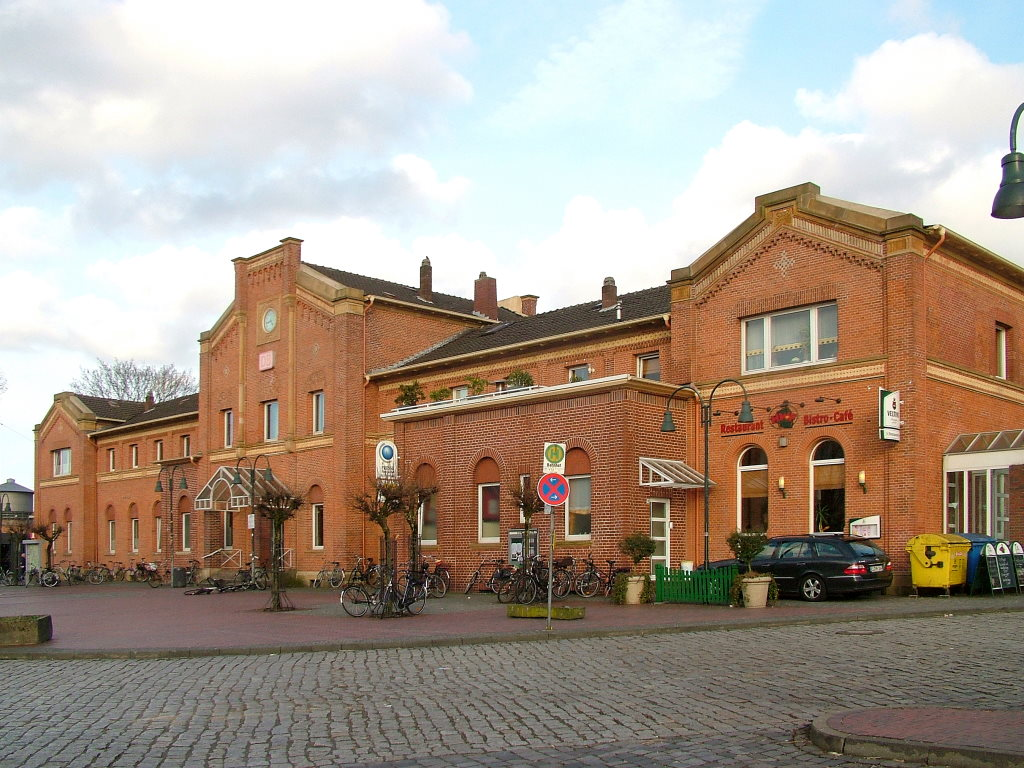
- Lingen (Ems) railway station

General information
- Location: Lingen, Lower Saxony, Germany
- Coordinates: 52°31′10″N 7°19′18″E
- Line: Emsland Railway

Construction
- Accessible: Yes

Other information
- Fare zone: VGE: Lingen (buses only); VGB: 142 (buses only)
- Website: www.bahnhof.de

History
- Opened: 1856

Services
Preceding station	DB Fernverkehr	Following station
Meppen towards Emden Außenhafen or Norddeich Mole	IC 35	Rheine towards Köln Hbf
Preceding station		Following station
Geeste towards Emden Hbf	RE 15	Leschede towards Münster Hbf
Location

Lingen (Ems) is a railway station located in Lingen, Lower Saxony, Germany. The station lies on the Emsland Railway (Rheine - Norddeich) and the train services are operated by Deutsche Bahn and WestfalenBahn.

== Train services ==
In the 2026 timetable, the following services stop at the station:

Line	Route		Interval	Operator	Rolling stock
IC 35	Norddeich Mole – Norden –	Emden – Münster – Düsseldorf – Cologne	120 min	DB Fernverkehr	Intercity 2
IC 35	Emden Außenhafen –	Emden – Münster – Düsseldorf – Cologne	120 min	DB Fernverkehr	Intercity 2
RE 15	Emden Außenhafen – Emden – Leer – Papenburg – Meppen – Lingen – Rheine – Münster		60 min	WestfalenBahn	Stadler FLIRT 3

== Bus services ==
Outside the station is a bus station.

== Gallery ==
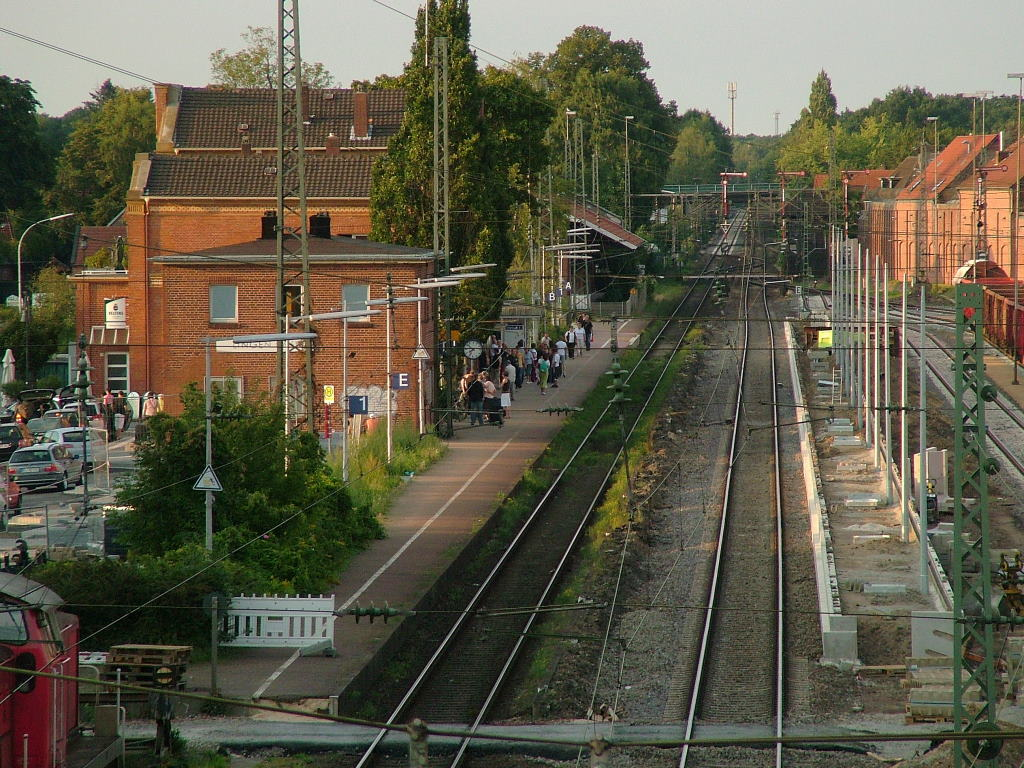
The station

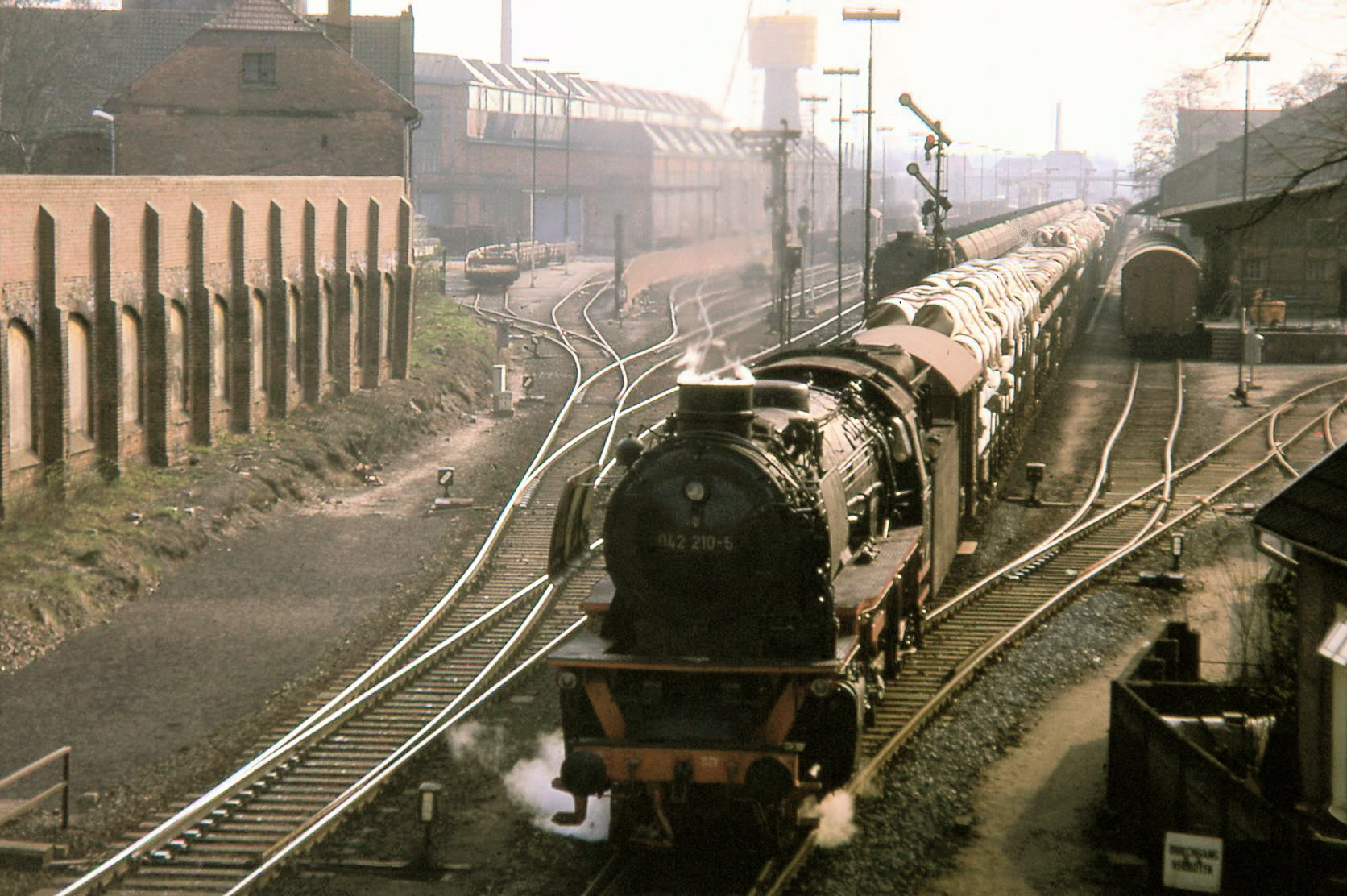
The station in 1974
