= Rheine–Norddeich Mole railway line =

Railway in Germany

Rheine–Norddeich Mole
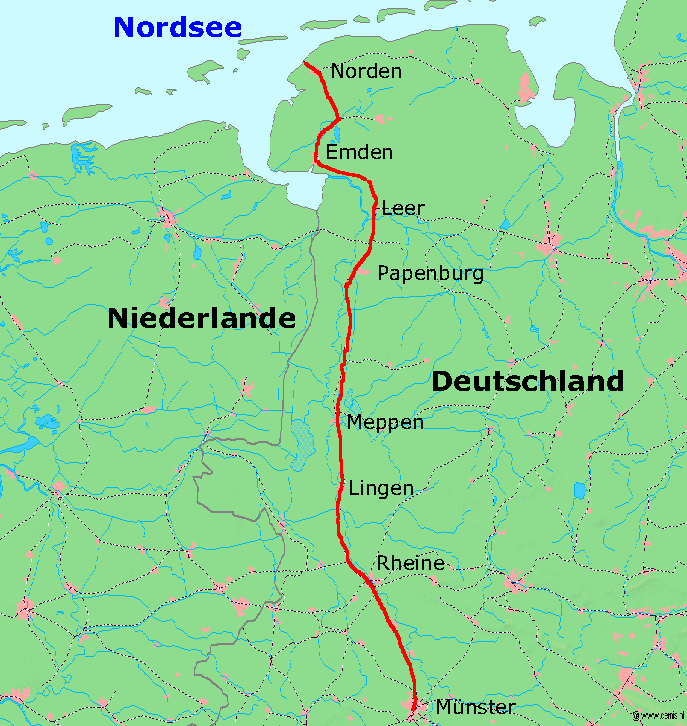

Overview
- Native name: Emslandstrecke
- Line number: 395
- Locale: Lower Saxony, Germany
- Termini: Norddeich-Mole; Rheine

Service
- Route number: 2931 (Rheine–Emden Süd); 1570 (Emden Süd–Norden); 1572 (Emden Hbf–Außenhafen); 1574 (Norden–Norddeich Mole)

Technical
- Line length: 176 km (109 mi)
- Track gauge: 1,435 mm (4 ft 8 1/2 in) standard gauge
- Electrification: 15 kV/16.7 Hz AC overhead catenary
- Operating speed: 140 km/h (87.0 mph) (maximum)

The Rheine–Norddeich Mole railway line, also called the Emsland line (German: Emslandstrecke), is a railway line from Rheine via Salzbergen, Lingen, Meppen, Lathen, Papenburg and Leer to Emden, continuing to Norden and Norddeich-Mole in East Frisia in the German state of Lower Saxony. The line is named after the Ems river, which it follows for almost its entire length. The line opened in 1854 and 1856 and is one of the oldest railways in Germany.

== History ==
The line was built as part of the Hanoverian Western Railway, which was built by the Royal Hanoverian State Railways in the 1850s to develop the western parts of the former Kingdom of Hanover. The first section of this line was opened on 24 November 1854, between Emden and Papenburg, but it had no connection with the existing rail network. On 21 November 1855 passenger operations started on the section between Löhne and Osnabrück, now part of the Löhne–Rheine line. Six months later the next section was put into operation, closing the gap from Osnabrück to Papenburg via Rheine and Salzbergen. On 23 June 1856 passenger trains ran for the first time between Minden and Emden.

The central workshops for the line were opened in 1855 in Lingen, which later became the Royal Prussian Railways Central Workshop, Lingen (Königlich Preußische Eisenbahnhauptwerkstätte Lingen (Ems)). Steam locomotives and wagons were maintained here until 1985. Rheine became a major railway junction with the connection of the line to Munster of the Royal Westphalian Railway Company (Königlich-Westfälischen Eisenbahn-Gesellschaft), opened in 1856, the Duisburg–Quakenbrück line of the Rhenish Railway Company (Rheinischen Eisenbahn-Gesellschaft), opened in 1879, and the former line to Ochtrup of the Prussian State Railways (Preußischen Staatseisenbahnen), opened in 1905.

In 1868 the line from Rheine to Emden was acquired by the Royal Westphalian Railway Company, which operated it until its nationalisation in 1880, when it became part of the Prussian State Railway.

Together with the building of the East Frisian Coastal Railway (Ostfriesischen Küstenbahn), the line was extended in 1883 from Emden via Norden, Esens and Wittmund to Jever and to Norddeich. This line ran west of central Emden and had a station called Larrelter Straße. This station was later renamed Emden West and the original Hanoverian station was renamed Emden Süd (south).

In September 1971, the new Emden Hauptbahnhof was opened on the site of the former West station. From then on trains from Rheine ran to the new station. For a few years the South station was used only when required for occasions when the Hauptbahnhof could not be reached, such as when the bascule bridge over the Emden channel was impassable; it was soon never used. The track to the South station was eventually removed completely in 2005.

=== Steam locomotives ===
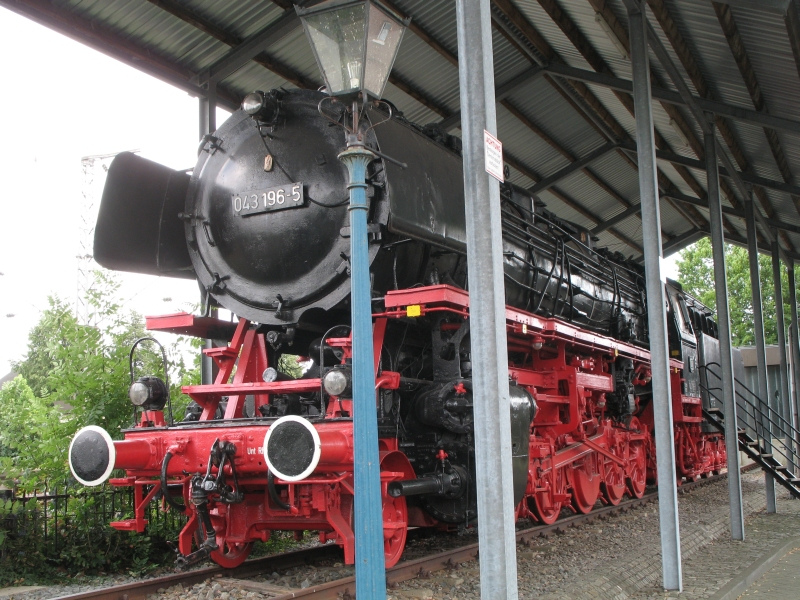
The last Deutsche Bundesbahn steam locomotive, displayed at Salzbergen station

The Emsland track was the last stretch of the former Deutsche Bundesbahn (German Federal Railways), on which steam locomotives ran in normal operations. Until 1975, express passenger trains were hauled by class 01.10 locomotives, these operation were then taken over by class 220 diesel locomotives. In freight transport, class 042 and 043 locomotives were still used until the autumn of 1977. Best known among local railway enthusiasts were the operations of the Langer Heinrich, which hauled heavy ore trains from Emden to the Ruhr. In September 1977, steam locomotives were still occasionally used, especially for special trains such as the farewell tours of 23 October 1977, when two locomotives once again ran all the way from Rheine to Emden. On 26 October 1977, the last two locomotives ran on the line.

A few days later, Deutsche Bundesbahn banned steam engines from the network. Eight years later, this ban was relaxed.

The last decommissioned steam locomotive of the Deutsche Bundesbahn, 043196–5, has been displayed since 1978 in front of Salzbergen station.

== Upgrading ==
Since 2005, Regional-Express services have operated over the line with new vehicles to the line's maximum speed of 140 km/h, but with some sections of the line limited to much lower speeds. The current total travel time of about 2:07 h cannot be significantly reduced without major modifications.

In June 2006, the Emden–Emden outer harbour line was electrified with overhead line, since then, the Emsland-Express connecting with the ferry service to Borkum runs from Emden station to Emden Außenhafen (outer harbour) station without passengers having to change trains.

== Operations ==
The following regional services run on the Emsland line or sections of it:

- RE 15 Emsland-Express: Münster–Rheine–Leer–Emden–Emden Außenhafen
- RE 1: Hanover–Bremen–Oldenburg–Leer–Emden–Norddeich Mole
- RB 61 Wiehengebirgs-Bahn: Bad Bentheim–Salzbergen–Rheine–Herford–Bielefeld
- RB 57: Groningen (NL)–Nieuweschans–Weener-Leer

The following InterCity services run on the line:

- IC 35: Norddeich Mole – Emden – Leer – Rheine – Münster – Recklinghausen – Gelsenkirchen – Oberhausen – Duisburg – Cologne – Koblenz (some to/from Mainz – Mannheim – Konstanz )
- IC 56: Norddeich Mole – Emden – Leer – Oldenburg – Bremen – Hannover – Berlin/Leipzig
- IC 77: Amsterdam – Bad Bentheim – Rheine – Osnabrück – Hannover – Berlin

== Rolling stock ==
After the timetable change of December 2005, Emsland-Express services were operated by double-decker carriages, hauled by class 111 electric locomotives. Passenger loadings increased by 15.5% on average to 6,400 passengers per day from 2005 to July 2009. Before 2005 the line was operated by single level Silberling carriages hauled by different locomotives, especially class 141s. For a long time, push-pull trains were used.

In 2012, the transport authorities, the Landesnahverkehrsgesellschaft Niedersachsen (LNVG) and the Zweckverband Nahverkehr Westfalen-Lippe (NWL), put the operation of the Münster–Emden regional express to tender. The contract was awarded to Westfalenbahn, a subsidiary of the Dutch State Railways, which started operations for 15 years from the timetable change in December 2015 with four-car Stadler FLIRT 3 electric multiple units from the leasing company Alpha Trains. The trains run in double traction during peak hour and have up to 42 bicycle parking spaces per multiple unit.

In the past, InterCity trains to Emden Außenhafen and Norddeich Mole were mostly hauled by class 101 or 120 locomotives. In the meantime, however, mostly Alstom Traxx electric locomotives (class 146) are used with modern double-decker cars, branded Intercity 2. These vehicles are also used on IC line 56 towards Bremen/Hannover. In 2020, a pair of Intercity Expresses from Munich to Norddeich-Mole was also introduced, running on IC line 35. This service now runs to Cologne, some continuing to Stuttgart or Konstanz.
