= Intercity 2 =

Railway service of Deutsche Bahn

Intercity 2, abbreviated as IC2, refers to DB Intercity trains formed of double-deck rolling stock. Such trains were first introduced by Deutsche Bahn Fernverkehr in December 2015 to replace its aging IC coaches.

== Rolling Stock ==
=== Bombardier Twindexx ===
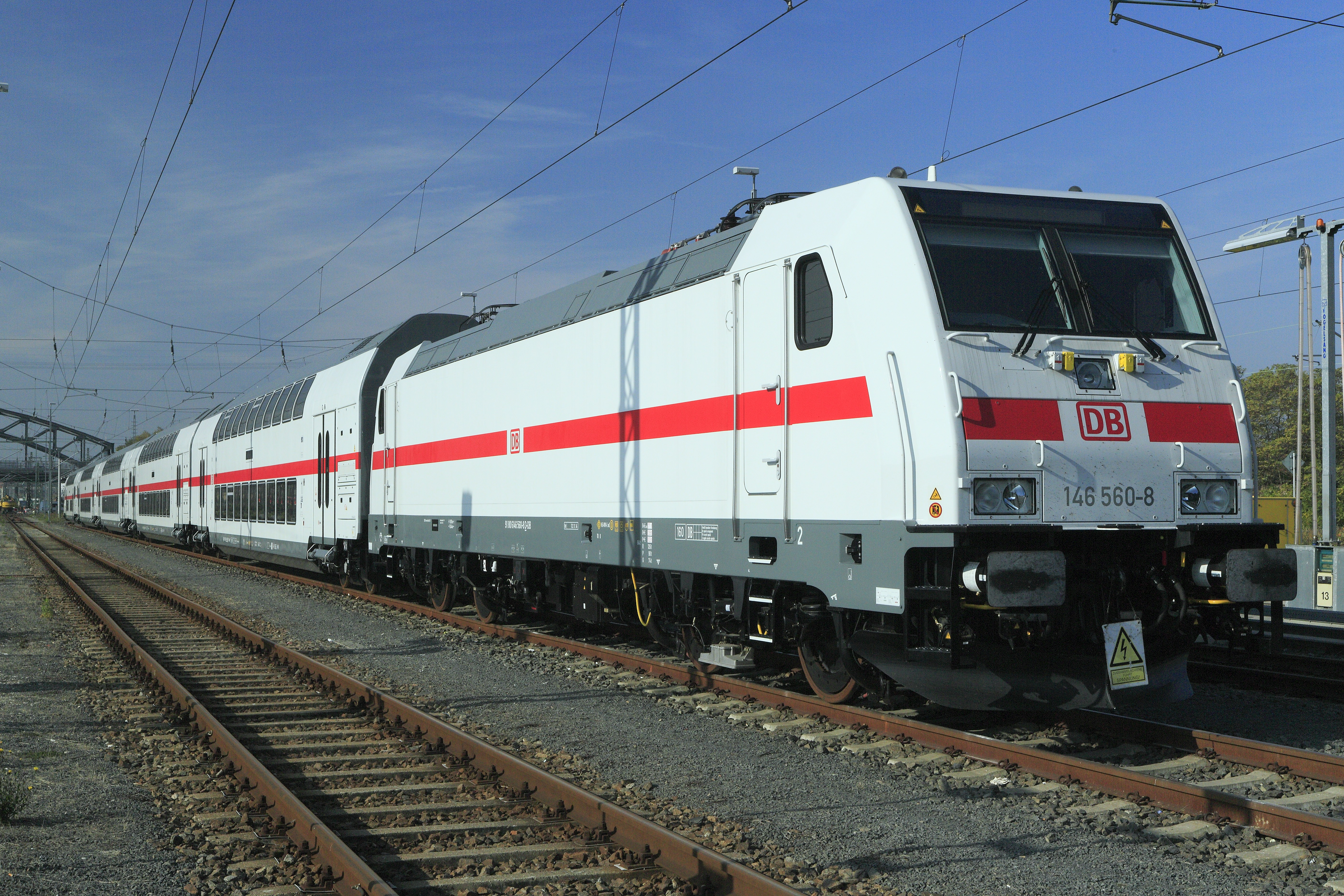
Twindexx Vario as "Intercity 2" push-pulled by a DBAG Class 146 locomotive

To modernize old Intercity cars and to increase the vehicle reserve of the long-distance traffic, Bombardier Twindexx double-deck coaches are used in inter-city rail traffic with a maximum speed (Vmax) of 160 km/h (99 mph). The locomotive is a DBAG Class 146.

These kinds of coaches are used in German Regional-Express trains, for Intercity services the coaches will get a more comfortable interior than in regional train double-decker coaches. In both classes only open coaches are provided, there will be no dining car. The double-decker coaches have been in service since 2015. Unlike most previous IC stock the new trains, marketed as "InterCity 2" by DB have a top speed of 160 km/h and are mainly intended for routes where higher speeds aren't possible or would offer little or no benefit with the ICE 4 to take over routes with maximum speeds between 160 km/h and 250 km/h (160 mph). The IC2 is also intended to expand the Intercity network to cities that had lost their long-distance service upon withdrawal of the Interregio.

=== Stadler KISS ===
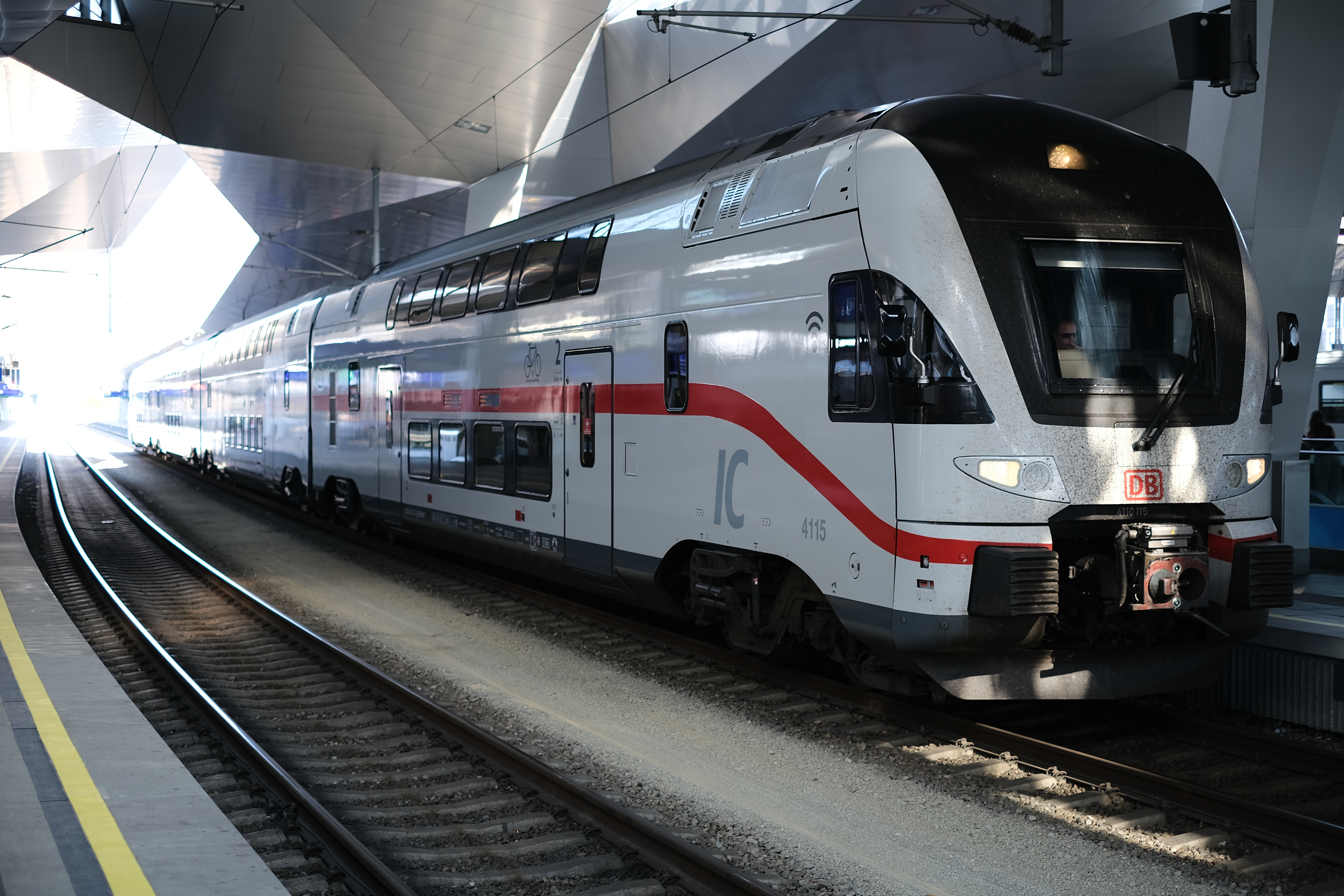
Stadler KISS as "Intercity 2"

In 2020, 17 used Stadler KISS EMUs were purchased from WESTbahn. These trains are able to operate at 200 km/h (120 mph). 4-car units are denoted Class 4110, 6-car units are denoted Class 4010.

A first batch of 4-car units started operating on the Dresden-Berlin-Rostock line in March 2020. 6-car units started operating on the Stuttgart-Singen-Zurich line in December 2022. These latter units replaced the loco-hauled IC2 consists that had been intended to operate on line 87 (Stuttgart–Singen–Zurich). Loco-hauled IC2 units were only able to operate Stuttgart-Singen but could not continue on to Switzerland as the manufacturer had failed to achieve approval for the ETCS safety system that is required for Switzerland.

At the beginning of 2025, all 17 trainsets were put up for sale stating insufficient capacity and overly costly and complicated maintenance which is still conducted in Vienna.

== See also ==
- Intercity (Deutsche Bahn)
- Rail transport in Germany
