= Emden Außenhafen station =

Railway station in Emden, Germany

Coordinates: 53.3439°N 7.1860°E

Emden Außenhafen
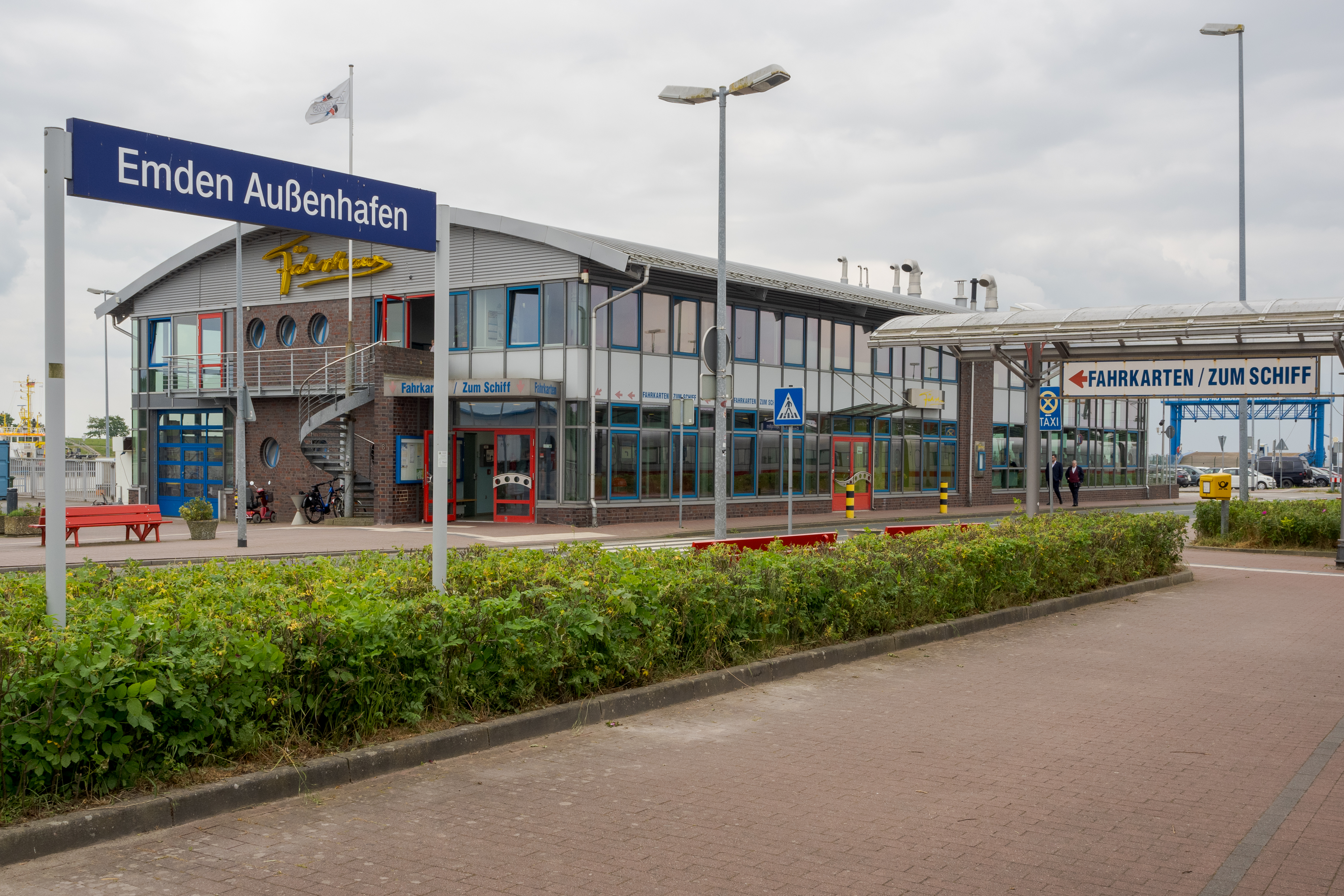
- Emden Außenhafen station, 2024

General information
- Connections: 3, 396; Borkum

Services
| Preceding station | DB Fernverkehr | Following station |
|---|---|---|
| Terminus | IC 35 | Emden Hbf towards Köln Hbf |
| Terminus | IC 56 | Emden Hbf towards Cottbus Hbf |
| Preceding station | | Following station |
| Terminus | RE 15 | Emden Hbf towards Münster Hbf |

The Emden Außenhafen station (Emden outer harbor) is a harbor station of the East Frisian city of Emden in Lower Saxony, Germany. It is a terminus for InterCity and regional trains.

== Location and structure ==
The station has one platform track, along with several sidings, among them some of Niedersachsen Ports GmbH & Co KG. The station serves as a feeder for the ferry to Borkum and is therefore located in the immediate vicinity of the Borkumkai of the Emden harbor.

The harbor station is connected via a single-track branch line with the Emden main station. All trains going from Leer to the Emden Außenhafen station have to change direction in the main station.

In June 2006, extensive modernization of the station and the track were completed, which is since then also provided with overhead line, so that electric trains can go to the harbor station. Also a new terminal for the change to the ferry was erected then.

== Services ==
The station is served by the following service(s):

| Line | Route | Interval | Operator | Rolling stock |
|---|---|---|---|---|
| IC 35 | Emden Außenhafen – Emden – Münster – Düsseldorf – Cologne | One train pair | DB Fernverkehr | Intercity 2 |
| IC 56 | Emden Außenhafen – Emden – Bremen – Hannover – Braunschweig – Magdeburg – Brandenburg – Berlin – Cottbus | One train pair | DB Fernverkehr | Intercity 2 |
| RE 15 | Emden Außenhafen – Emden – Leer – Papenburg – Meppen – Lingen – Rheine – Münster | 60 min | WestfalenBahn | Stadler FLIRT 3 |
