= WestfalenBahn =

German regional train service company

- Industry: Public transport
- Founded: 2005
- Headquarters: Bielefeld, Germany
- Owner: Abellio Deutschland
- Website: www.westfalenbahn.de

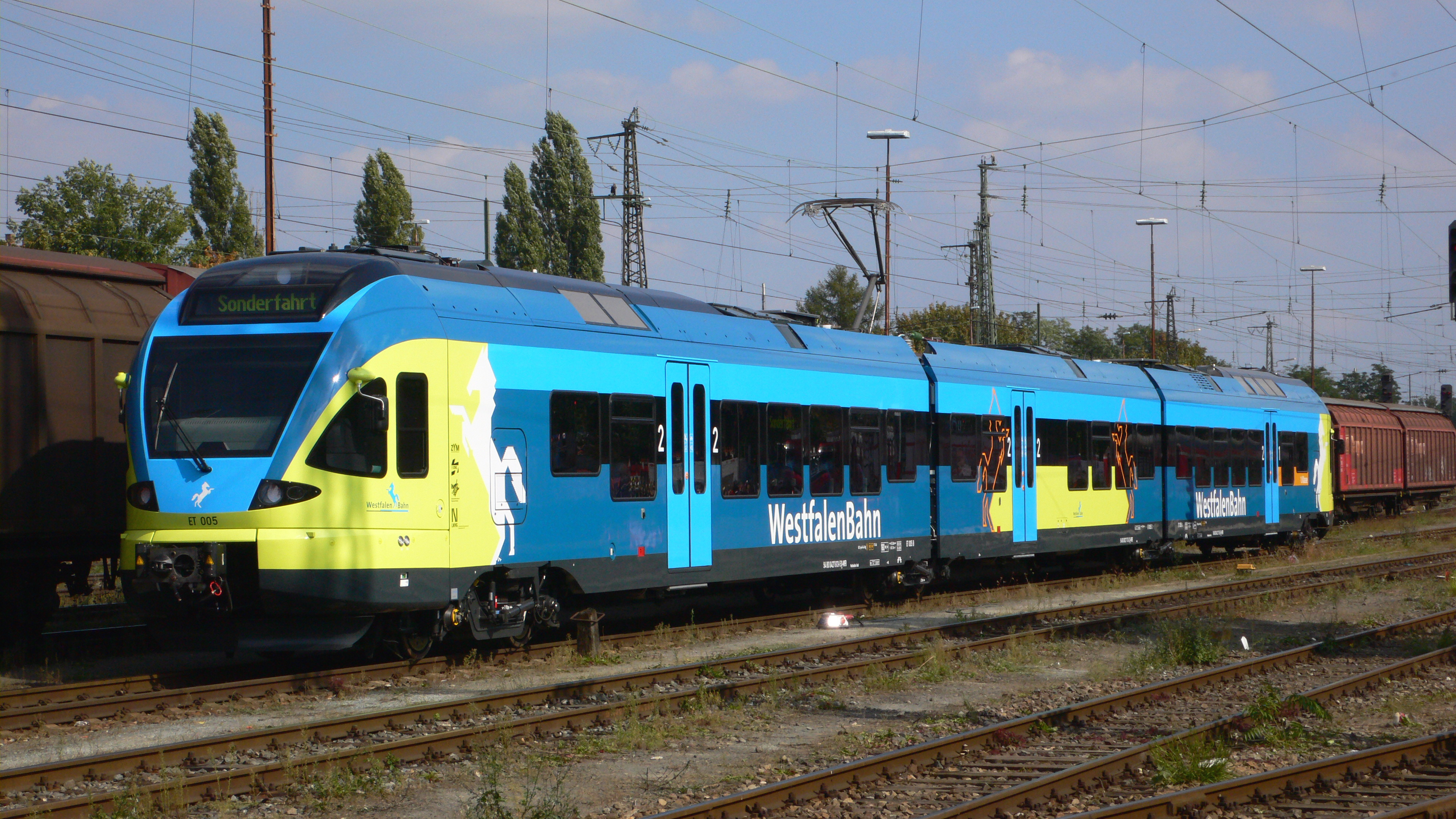
Stadler Flirt in September 2007

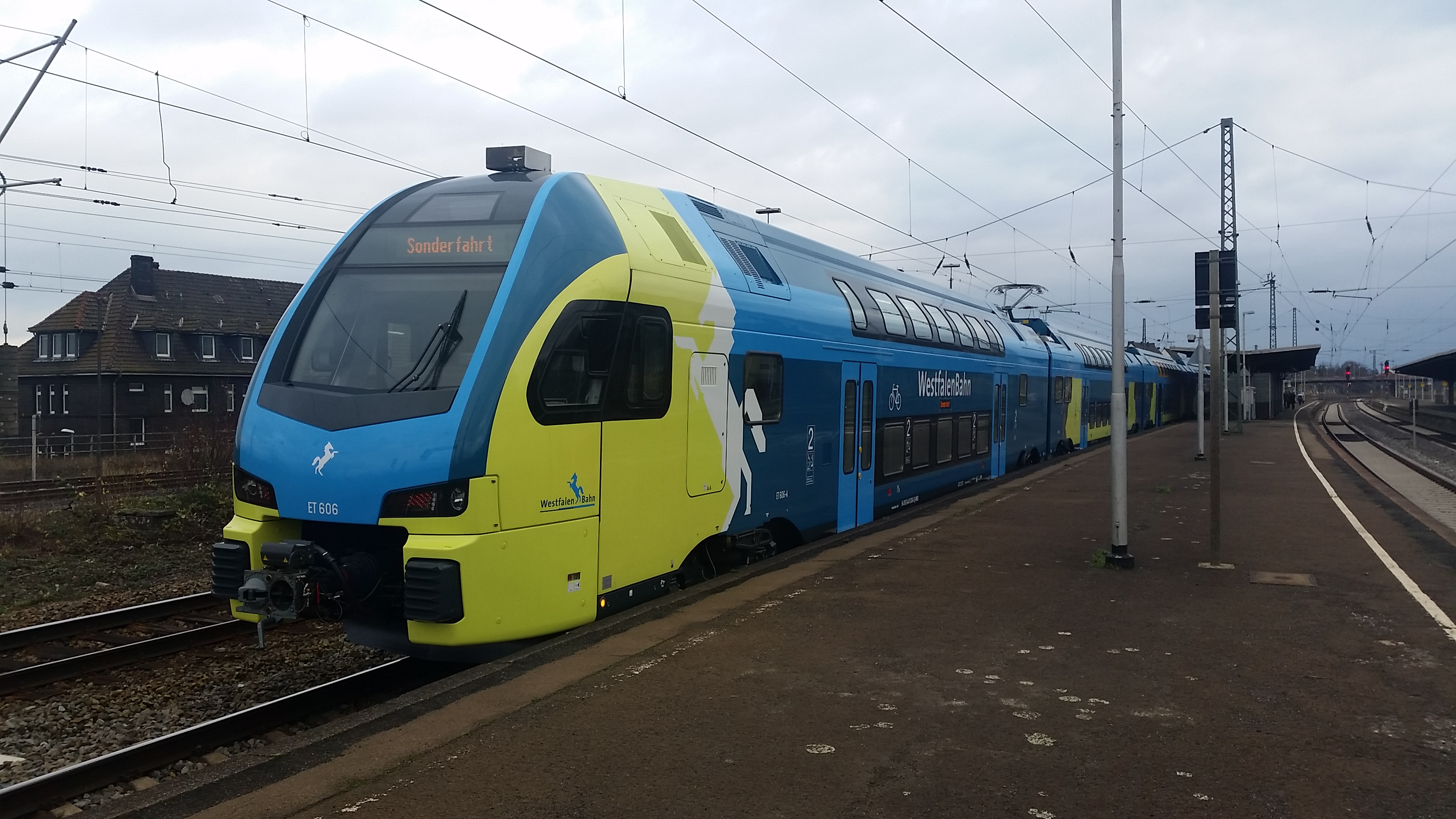
Stadler Kiss at Löhne in December 2015

WestfalenBahn is a railway company operating regional train service in Lower Saxony and North Rhine-Westphalia, Northern Germany. It was founded in 2005 by Essener Versorgungs & Verkehrsgesellschaft, Minden Museum Railway, moBiel and Verkehrsbetriebe Extertal, each having a 25% share. In 2008 Essener Versorgungs & Verkehrsgesellschaft's share was sold to Abellio Deutschland. In July 2017 Abellio bought out the other shareholders.

== Services ==
WestfalenBahn operated routes RB61, RB65, RB66 and RB72 from 9 December 2007 until December 2017, when they were taken over by Eurobahn. These were operated by a fleet of fourteen 3-car and five 5-car Stadler Flirts.

- Local services RB 61 Wiehengebirgs-Bahn: Bad Bentheim – Rheine – Osnabrück – Bünde – Herford – Bielefeld
- Local services RB 65 Ems-Bahn: Rheine – Münster
- Local services RB 66 Teuto-Bahn: Osnabrück – Münster
- Local services RB 72 Ostwestfalen-Bahn: Herford – Lage – Detmold – Altenbeken – Paderborn

On 13 December 2015 WestfalenBahn commenced a 15-year contract to operate the RE15, RE60 and RE70 services. To operate these services, 15 Stadler Flirt and 13 Stadler Kisses were leased from Alpha Trains.

- Regional services RE 15 Emsland-Express: Emden – Leer – Lingen – Rheine – Münster
- Regional services RE 60Ems-Leine-Express: Rheine – Osnabrück – Löhne – Minden – Hanover – Braunschweig
- Regional services RE 70 Weser-Leine-Express: Bielefeld – Herford – Löhne – Minden – Hanover – Braunschweig

== Fleet ==
Class	Image	Cars per set	Type	Top speed		Number	Builder	Built
Class	Image	Cars per set	Type	km/h	mph	Number	Builder	Built
ET.000		3 or 5	Electric multiple unit	160	99	14	Stadler Flirt	2007
ET.400		4	Electric multiple unit	160	99	15	Stadler Flirt 3	2015
ET.600		6	Electric multiple unit	160	99	13	Stadler Kiss	2015
