= Emden Hauptbahnhof =

Railway station in Emden, Germany

Emden Hbf
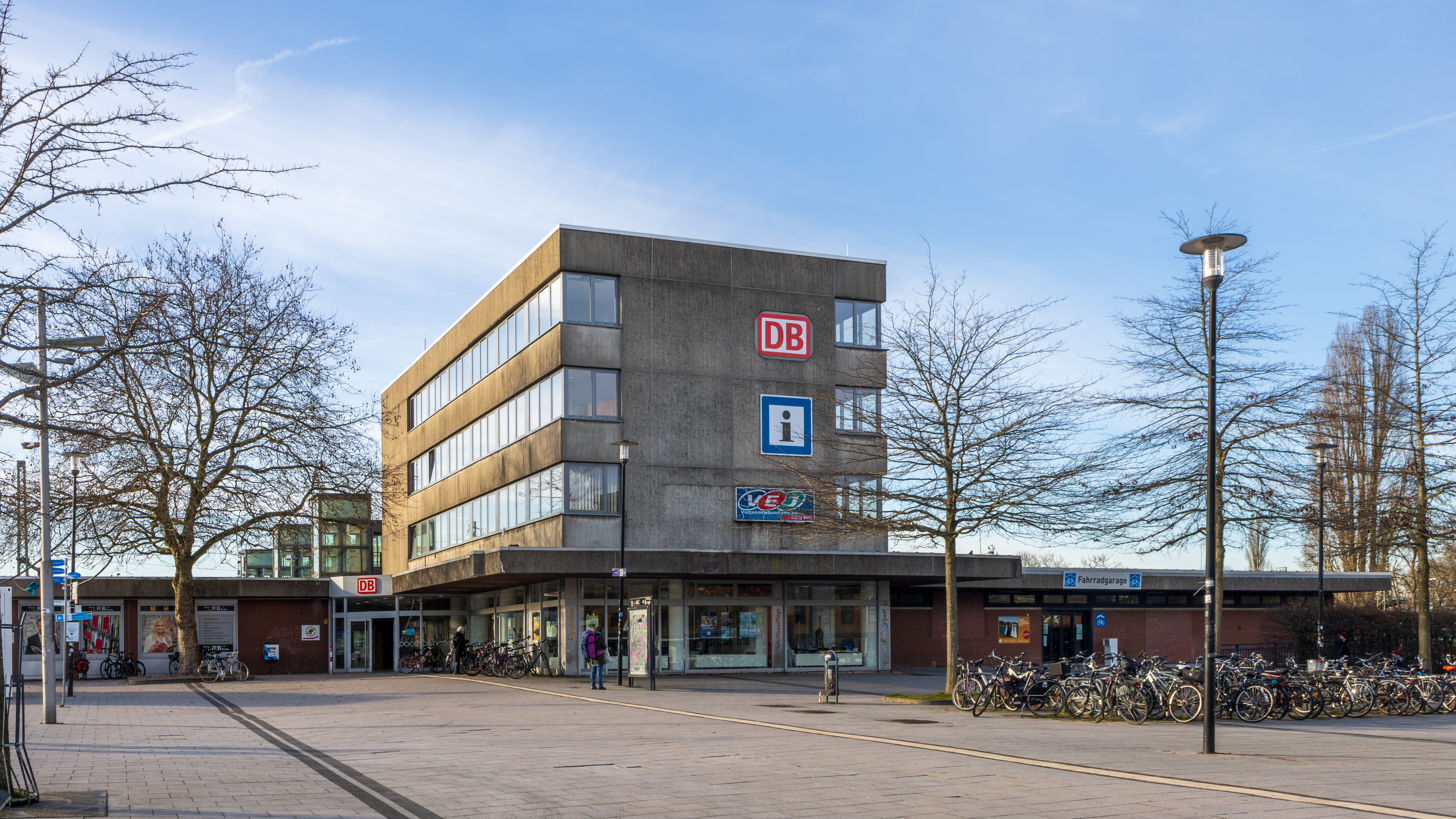
- View of the station

General information
- Location: Bahnhofsplatz 11,Emden, Lower Saxony; Germany
- Coordinates: 53°22′12″N 7°11′46″E
- Owner: DB Netz
- Operator: DB Station&Service
- Line: KBS 395: Emsland Railway
- Platforms: 5

Construction
- Accessible: Yes

Other information
- Station code: 1580
- DS100 code: HE
- IBNR: 8001768
- Category: 3
- Website: www.bahnhof.de

History
- Opened: 1971
Services
Preceding station	DB Fernverkehr	Following station
Norden towards Norddeich Mole	IC 35	Leer towards Köln Hbf
Reverses direction	IC 35	Emden Außenhafen Terminus
Marienhafe towards Norddeich Mole	IC 56	Leer towards Cottbus Hbf or Leipzig Hbf
Reverses direction	IC 56	Emden Außenhafen Terminus
Preceding station	DB Regio Nord	Following station
Norden towards Norddeich Mole	RE 1	Leer towards Hannover Hbf
Preceding station		Following station
Reverses direction	RE 15	Leer towards Münster Hbf
Reverses direction	RE 15	Emden Außenhafen Terminus
Location
- Location within Lower Saxony

Emden Hauptbahnhof is the main station in Emden in the German state of Lower Saxony. It is the terminus of the Emsland Railway, connecting Emden with Münster and the Ruhr and the starting point of the East Frisian coastal railway from Emden to Norden and Norddeich, both of which are electrified. It is also connected to the city's second busiest station of Emden Außenhafen (outer harbour) by a line that has been electrified since 2006.

== History ==
Emden Hauptbahnhof was opened in 1971 and is a grey concrete building, as was in vogue then. Because of Emden's water-logged foundations, the platforms are not reached by a pedestrian tunnel, but via a flyover.

Until 1971, the main station in Emden was about two kilometres further east, now better known as Emden Süd (south) station. The station which is now the location of the Hauptbahnhof was called West Emden from 1935, before that it was called Larrelter Straße. Beside it was the Emden station of metre gauge line of the Emden-Pewsum-Greetsiel Light Railway.

The last buildings and tracks of Emden Süd station have now been demolished and replaced by a new residential district.

== Train services ==
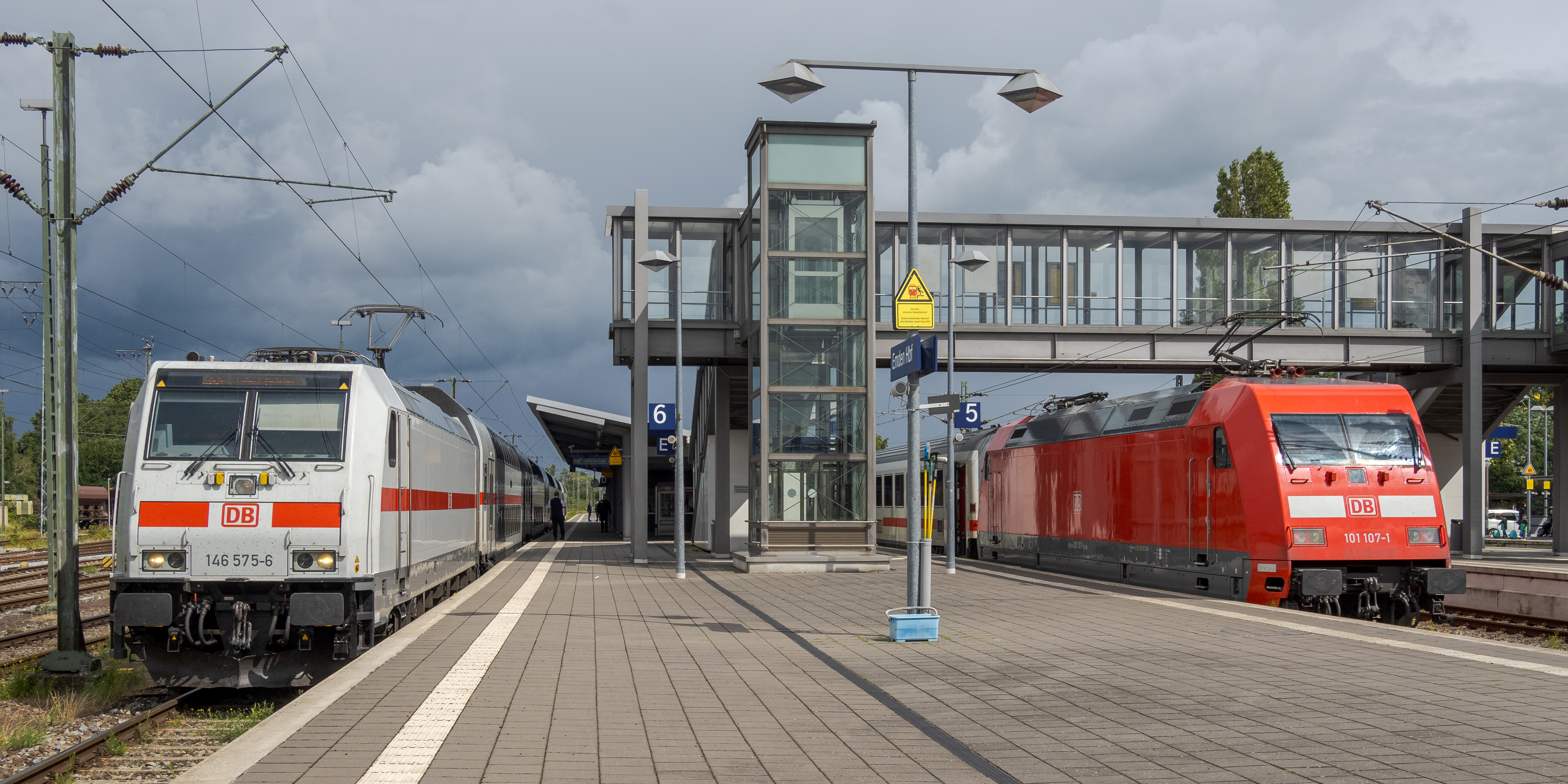
Emden Central with IC 2434 to Leipzig and IC 2206 from Koblenz.

Every day, InterCity trains run in the direction of Koblenz (via Münster, the Ruhr and Cologne) and to Cottbus and Leipzig (via Bremen and Hanover). Regional services run to Münster and via Oldenburg and Bremen to Hanover. Some of those trains that terminate in Emden, run to Emden Außenhafen and are timed to connect with the ferries to Borkum. The others terminate at the Hauptbahnhof.

In the 2026 timetable, the following services stop at the station:

Line	Route			Interval	Operator	Rolling stock
IC 35	Norddeich Mole – Norden –	Emden – Münster – Düsseldorf – Cologne		120 min	DB Fernverkehr	Intercity 2
IC 35	Emden Außenhafen –	Emden – Münster – Düsseldorf – Cologne		120 min	DB Fernverkehr	Intercity 2
IC 56	Norddeich Mole – Norden –	Emden – Bremen – Hanover – Braunschweig – Magdeburg –	Leipzig	120 min	DB Fernverkehr	Intercity 2
IC 56	Emden Außenhafen –	Emden – Bremen – Hanover – Braunschweig – Magdeburg –	Potsdam – Berlin – Cottbus	120 min	DB Fernverkehr	Intercity 2
RE 1	Norddeich Mole – Norden – Emden – Leer – Oldenburg – Delmenhorst – Bremen – Nienburg – Hannover			120 min	DB Regio Nord	Traxx P160 AC1 (146.1/146.2) + 7 double deck stock
RE 15	Emden Außenhafen – Emden – Leer – Papenburg – Meppen – Lingen – Rheine – Münster			60 min	WestfalenBahn	Stadler FLIRT 3

== See also ==
- Rail transport in Germany
- Railway stations in Germany
