= Süderlügum (Amt) =

Coordinates: 54.867°N 8.917°E

Südtondern
- Former Amt
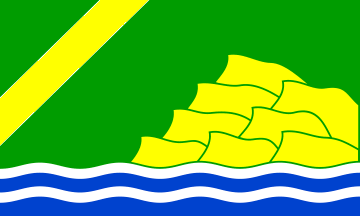
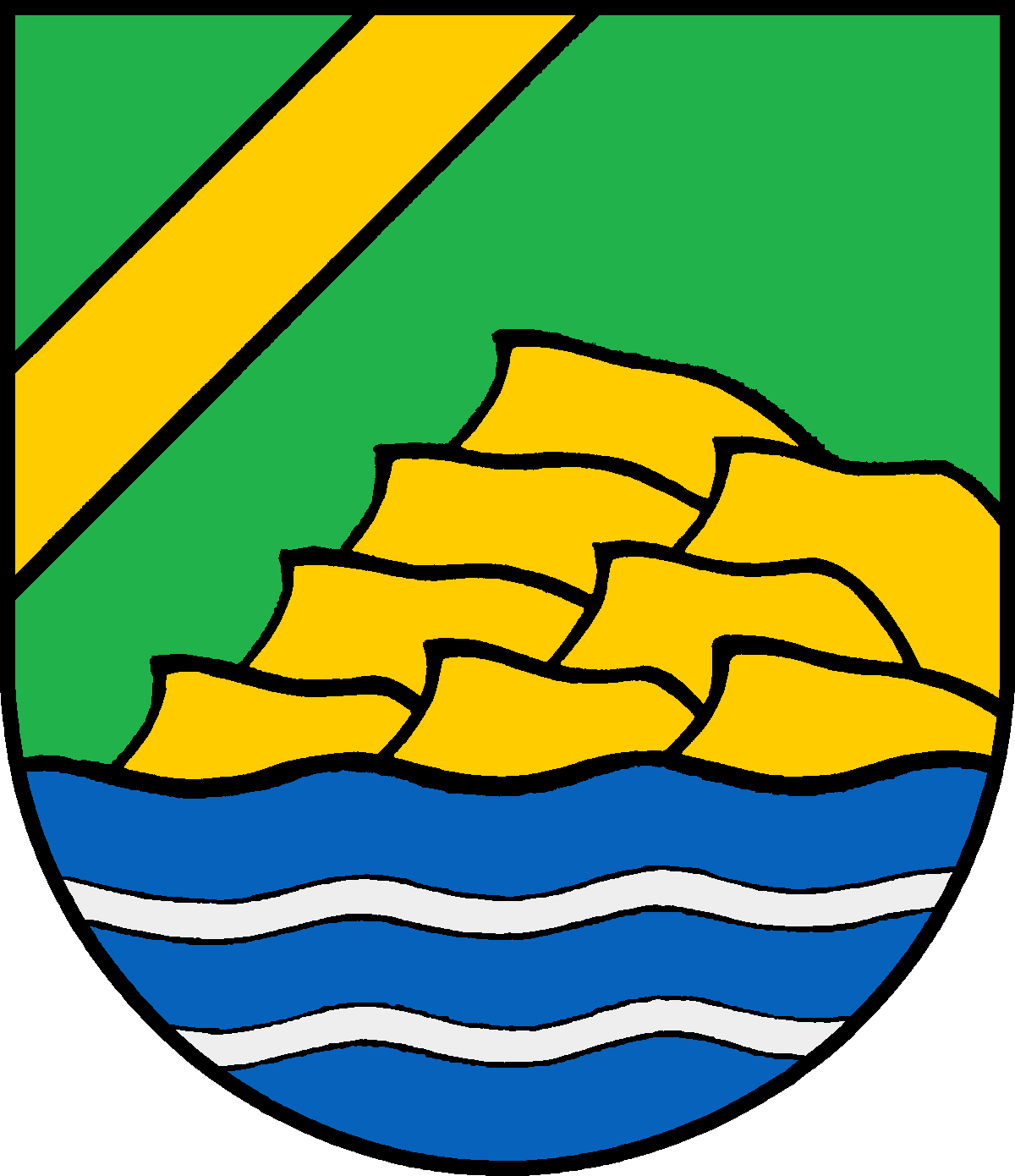
- Flag Coat of arms

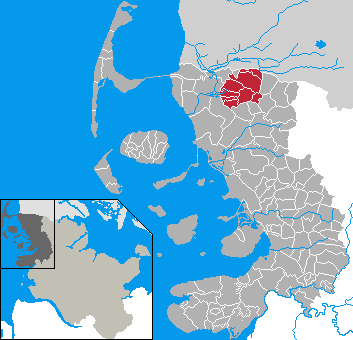
- Map of Nordfriesland highlighting Süderlügum
- Country: Germany
- State: Schleswig-Holstein
- District: Nordfriesland
- Disestablished: January 2008
- Region seat: Süderlügum

Area
  - Total: 90 km^{2} (35 sq mi)

Süderlügum was an Amt ("collective municipality") in the district of Nordfriesland, in Schleswig-Holstein, Germany. Its seat was in Süderlügum.

In January 2008, it was merged with the Ämter Karrharde, Bökingharde and Wiedingharde, and the municipalities Niebüll and Leck to form the Amt Südtondern.

The Amt Süderlügum consisted of the following municipalities:

1. Bosbüll
2. Braderup
3. Ellhöft
4. Holm
5. Humptrup
6. Lexgaard
7. Süderlügum
8. Uphusum
