= Karrharde =

Coordinates: 54°47′N 9°02′E

- Former Amt
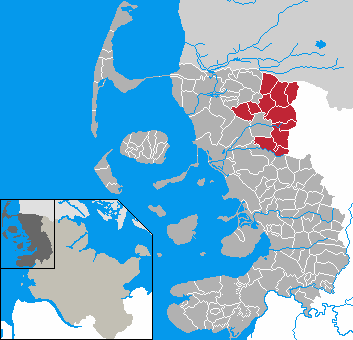
- Map of Nordfriesland highlighting Karrharde
- Country: Germany
- State: Schleswig-Holstein
- District: Nordfriesland
- Disestablished: January 2008
- Region seat: Leck

Area
  - Total: 180 km^{2} (69 sq mi)

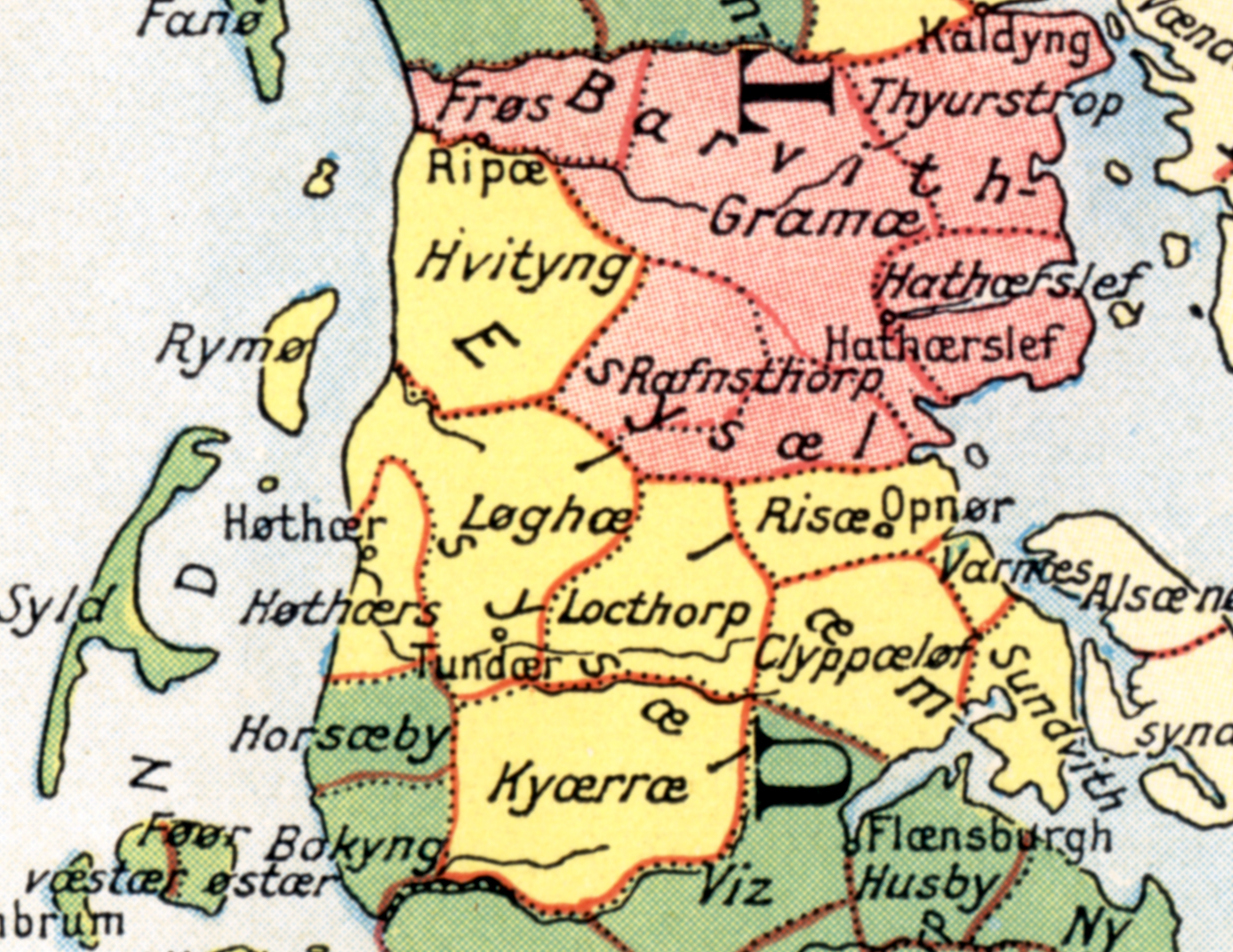
Amt Karrharde was named after the medieval Kær Herred which extended much further east.

Karrharde (North Frisian: Kårhiird; Danish: Kær Herred) was an amt (collective municipality) in the district of Nordfriesland, in Schleswig-Holstein, Germany. It was situated on the border with Denmark, approx. 35 km north of Husum, and 25 km west of Flensburg. Its seat was in Leck, itself not part of the amt.

In January 2008, it was merged with the Ämter Bökingharde, Süderlügum and Wiedingharde, and the municipalities Niebüll and Leck to form the Amt Südtondern.

The amt of Karrharde consisted of the following municipalities (as of 2005 population in parentheses):

- Achtrup (1548)
- Bramstedtlund (237)
- Enge-Sande (1150)
- Karlum (218)
- Klixbüll (932)
- Ladelund (1516)
- Sprakebüll (221)
- Stadum (1070)
- Tinningstedt (209)
- Westre (400)
