= Wiedingharde =

Coordinates: 54°52′N 8°41′E

- Former Amt
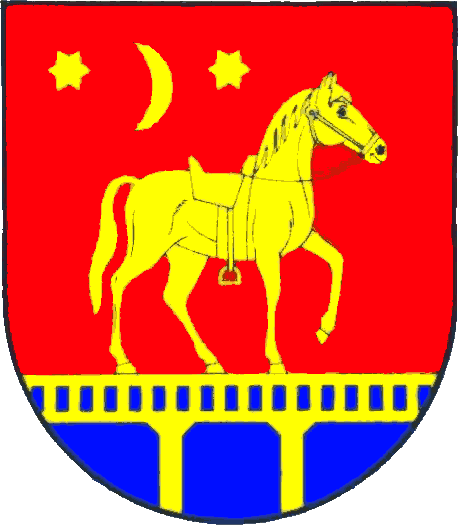
- Seal

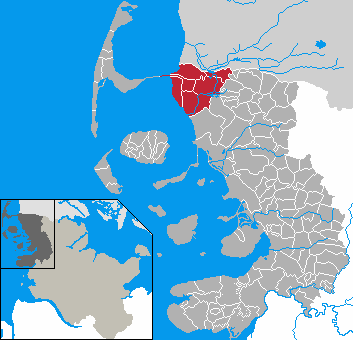
- Map of Nordfriesland highlighting Karrharde
- Country: Germany
- State: Schleswig-Holstein
- District: Nordfriesland
- Disestablished: January 2008
- Region seat: Neukirchen

Area
  - Total: 125 km^{2} (48 sq mi)

Wiedingharde (Wiedingharde North Frisian: Wiringhiird) was an amt (collective municipality) in the district of Nordfriesland, in Schleswig-Holstein, Germany. It was situated on the North Sea coast and on the border with Denmark. Its seat was in Neukirchen (Naisjösbel).

In January 2008, it was merged with the Ämter Karrharde, Süderlügum and Bökingharde, and the municipalities Niebüll and Leck to form the Amt Südtondern.

The amt of Wiedingharde consisted of these municipalities (population in 2005 in parentheses):

- Aventoft (508)
- Emmelsbüll-Horsbüll (1056)
- Friedrich-Wilhelm-Lübke-Koog (165)
- Klanxbüll (941)
- Neukirchen (1315)
- Rodenäs (452)
