= Bökingharde =

Coordinates: 54°46′N 8°52′E

- Former Amt
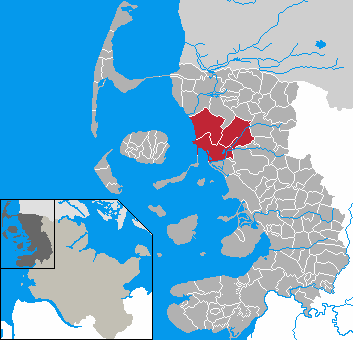
- Map of Nordfriesland highlighting Bökingharde
- Country: Germany
- State: Schleswig-Holstein
- District: Nordfriesland
- Disestablished: January 2008
- Region seat: Risum-Lindholm

Area
  - Total: 137 km^{2} (53 sq mi)

Bökingharde (Mooring North Frisian: Böökinghiird; Danish: Bøking Herred) was an amt (collective municipality) in the district of Nordfriesland, in Schleswig-Holstein, Germany. It was situated on the North Sea coast, approx. 35 km northwest of Husum. Its seat was in Risum-Lindholm.

In January 2008, it was merged with the Ämter Karrharde, Süderlügum and Wiedingharde, and the municipalities Niebüll and Leck to form the Amt Südtondern.

The Amt of Bökingharde consisted of the following municipalities (population in 2005 in parentheses):

- Dagebüll (939)
- Galmsbüll (664)
- Risum-Lindholm (3627)
- Stedesand (870)
