= Danish language decrees of 1851 =

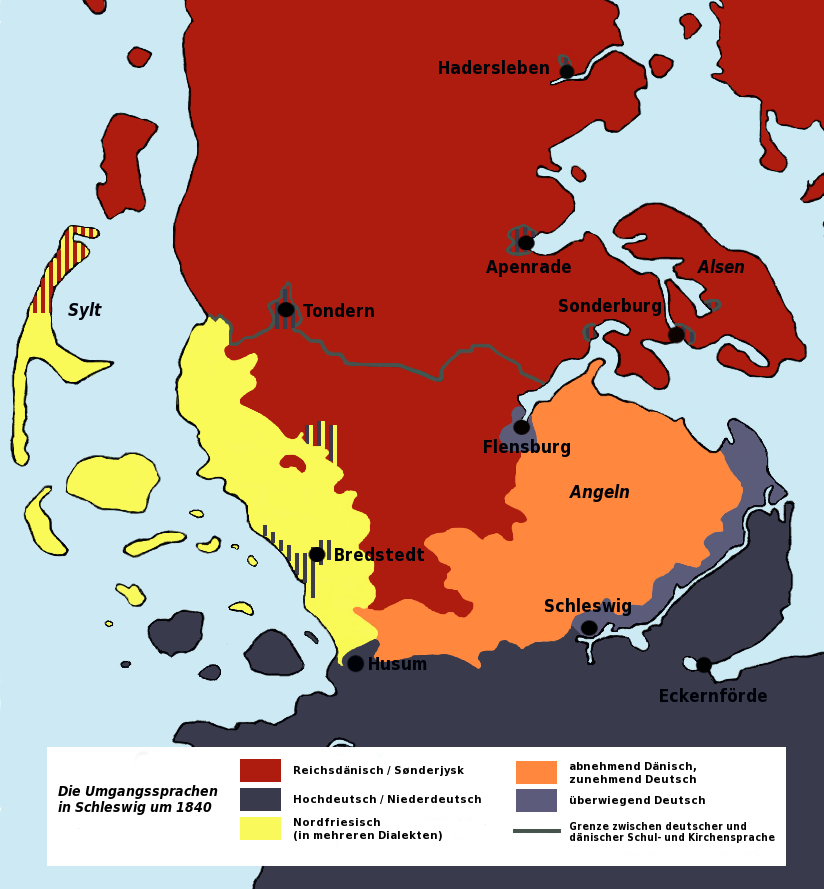
Depiction of language change in the Duchy of Schleswig around 1840. The map also shows that the predominant colloquial language and church language were not always identical.

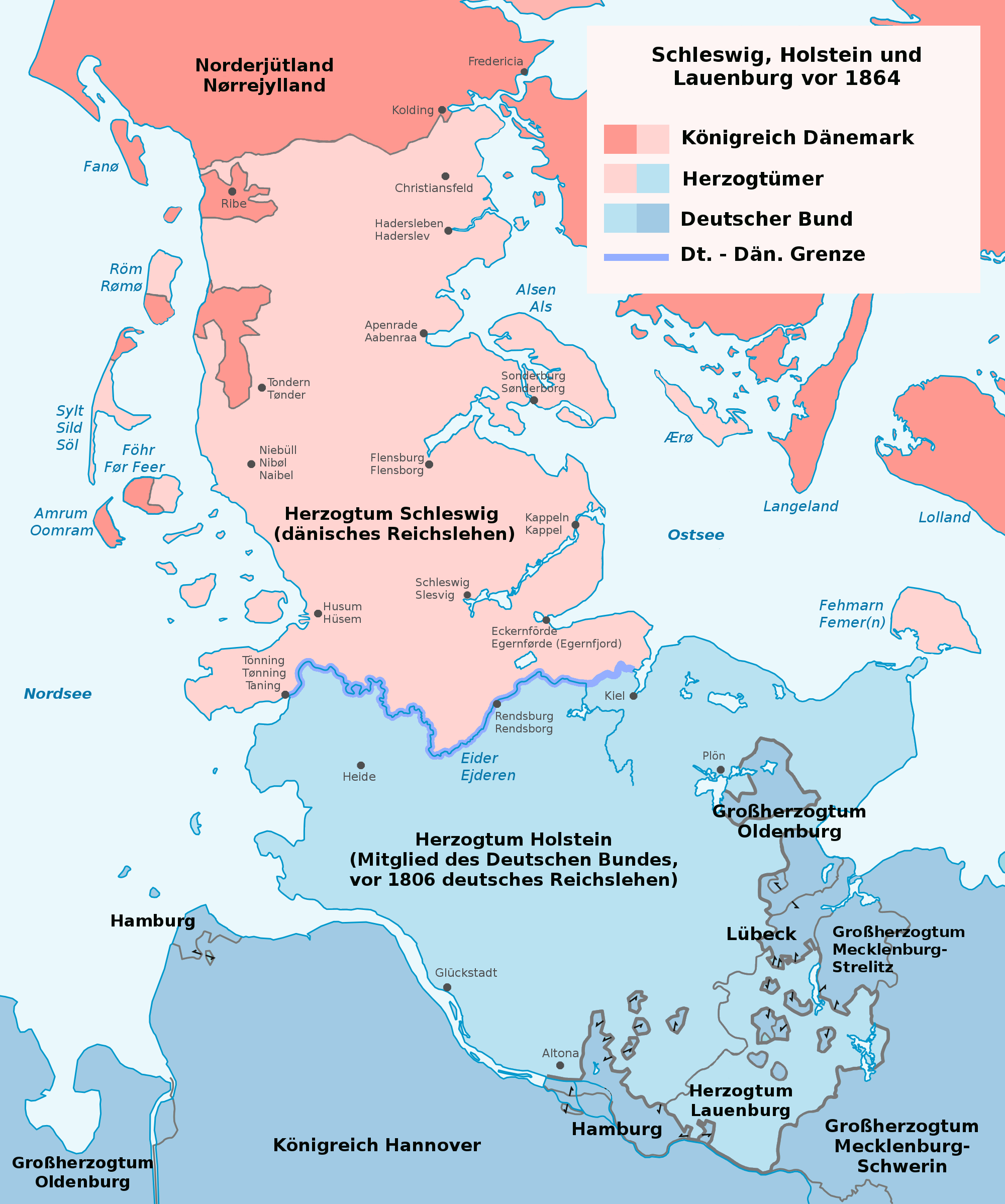
The political status of the duchies until 1864

The Danish language decrees of 1851 were a language policy measure introduced by the conservative Danish government of the time with the aim of halting the language shift to German in the central parts of the Duchy of Schleswig and binding Schleswig more closely to the Kingdom of Denmark through closer alignment of its language and culture after the suppression of the Schleswig-Holstein uprising of 1848/1849. To this end, Danish was introduced as the language of instruction in 58 municipalities in the central Schleswig area, where Danish was still widely spoken but German was often already the predominant language. Church services were to be conducted alternately in German and Danish. Court proceedings were to use the language preferred by the persons concerned.

Schleswig itself was multilingual, with Danish predominating in the north, German in the south, and Frisian in parts of North Frisia. In the central areas (such as Angeln and the Geest), a language shift from Danish to German took place in the 19th century. The language issue had already been an important aspect of the Schleswig-Holstein question in the first half of the 19th century. With growing nationalism, the mother tongue became increasingly important as a sign of national identity. The language decrees can thus be understood as an expression of Denmark's desire for a nation state with a uniform language and culture. On the part of the German-minded Schleswig-Holsteiners, however, the attempt at forced Danishization led to increased hatred of the Danes and contributed to the breakup of the Danish Unitary State. After Denmark's defeat in the German-Danish War of 1864, the Danish language decrees were repealed. In the Prussian province of Schleswig-Holstein, the Danish language was then suppressed in North Schleswig from 1871 onwards with similar measures.

== Background ==
The Duchy of Schleswig had been a Danish fiefdom since the Middle Ages. The Treaty of Ribe in 1460 established a personal union with the Kingdom of Denmark. The Danish Unitary State was a multinational state held together by loyalty to a common ruler. Within the state, German had been the dominant language of the upper classes and the educated since the 15th century. In the 18th century, Germans formed a significant part of the upper class and cultural life of the capital Copenhagen. Even the kings from the House of Oldenburg, their wives, most of whom came from German ruling houses, and the members of the government, who for centuries were recruited from German noble families, often did not speak Danish. It was not until Christian VII that criticism of the dominance of German became vocal, mainly in response to the government of the German Johann Friedrich Struensee. After 1772, Ove Høegh-Guldberg introduced Danish as the command language of the army. At the same time, a distinct Danish literature developed.

=== Multilingualism in Schleswig ===
Schleswig had been a "language contact area" since the Middle Ages and remained multilingual throughout the 19th century. The rural population, which made up around 90% of the inhabitants, used various languages and dialects in everyday life. Many Schleswigers were multilingual. About half of them used Danish dialects at least some of the time, especially the various dialects of Sønderjysk (South Jutlandic). During the first half of the 19th century, the area in which Danish dialects were predominant in everyday life shifted northward. Angel Danish, spoken in Angeln and Schwansen, with its increasing use of German loanwords, was more of a mixed language than a Danish dialect and had been disappearing since the end of the 18th century. South of the Schleswig–Husum line, Low German was spoken almost exclusively. At the time of the language change, another language island finally formed in the mid-19th century in the parish of Viöl, located on the Geest, with the South Jutlandic dialect Fjoldemål. On the west coast between Husum and the Vidå, the North Frisian dialects, which varied from place to place, were widespread. None of these languages had a written form or even literature. The Danish and Frisian dialects were mostly spoken as regional languages in a locally limited area, so that mastery of at least one other language was necessary for supraregional communication. Since the people of South Schleswig were mostly economically oriented towards the south, knowledge of German was indispensable.

Together with the purely German-speaking Duchy of Holstein, Schleswig was administered by the German Chancellery, whose administrative language was High German. By 1700, High German had already replaced Low German as the sole official language. However, only the relatively small urban upper class spoke High German. Nevertheless, High German was also the language of the church and schools in the communities south of what later became the Clausen Line and in all cities. In the rural communities north of this line, sermons were preached at least partly in standard Danish – and hymns from the German hymnbook were sung in the same service, as there was no Danish hymnbook for Schleswig for a long time. The Christelig Psalmebog of 1801 was rejected by many Pietist Danish-speaking communities because of its rationalist character. In rural schools in North Schleswig, lessons were often taught in Danish, although Danish-language textbooks were not introduced until the end of the 18th century. The unwritten vernacular languages and dialects were deliberately combated by secular and ecclesiastical authorities. On the one hand, this was done to create uniformity. On the other hand, there was a prevailing assumption that education was only possible in the standard language. For example, the catechism necessary for understanding Lutheran doctrine was only available in the standard language, which is why most preachers attached great importance to teaching High German in schools. The view that High German was the language of education was also widespread among the population. As a result, the number of parents who spoke German with their children instead of Danish or Frisian increased steadily. Within a few decades, the native language changed. The use of everyday Danish became increasingly a phenomenon of the lower classes. But especially in circles where High German was not widely spoken, the High German language of the church was given a sacred meaning similar to that of Latin in the Catholic Church. Only a few pastors spoke out in favor of aligning the language of the church and schools with the vernacular to ensure that their congregations truly understood the Christian message.

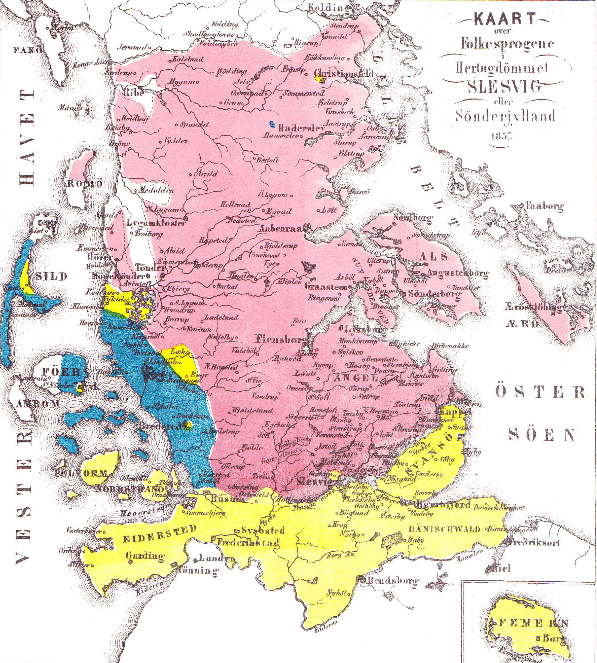
According to Carl Ferdinand Allen's 1858 description of the linguistic situation from a Danish perspective, Danish was the predominant language as far as the Schlei.

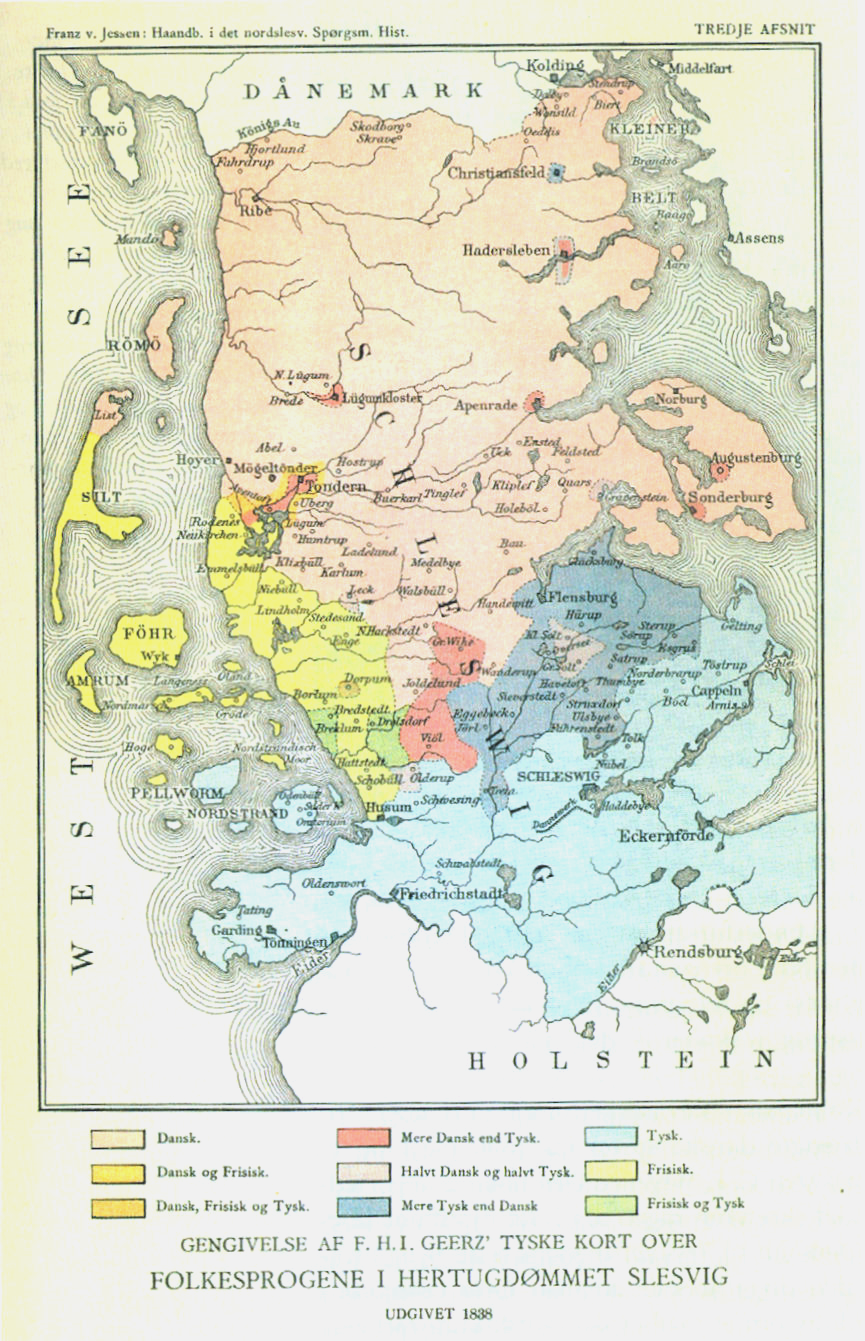
Franz Geerz's map from 1838 shows a nuanced picture of the linguistic situation in Schleswig (pink = Danish, yellow = Frisian, blue = German, red = more Danish than German, gray = more German than Danish).

=== Language as a political issue in the first half of the 19th century ===
Until the crises triggered by the Napoleonic Wars at the beginning of the 19th century, the Danish state as a whole was considered a progressive state in which the nationality and language of its inhabitants were not accorded any significance beyond everyday life. The Danish king was revered equally by all his subjects, regardless of their mother tongue.

==== The language laws of 1806 and 1810 ====
In 1806, the Holy Roman Empire, to which the Duchy of Holstein belonged, was dissolved. The Danish king Christian VII then declared the Duchy of Holstein, which had belonged to the Empire, to be an "inseparable part" of the Danish Kingdom. In 1807, a law required all officials of the duchies to be proficient in both (standard) languages. All public decrees in both duchies were to be published in both languages with immediate effect. On December 15, 1810, Frederick VI then issued a law stipulating that Danish should be the language of administration, courts, schools, and churches wherever the population spoke Danish in everyday life. The German civil servants of the German Chancellery and in the local offices opposed the introduction, arguing that, firstly, they themselves did not speak Danish and, secondly, the “crow's Danish” spoken in Central Schleswig was about as far removed from Imperial Danish as it was from High German. Nevertheless, a chair for the Danish language was established at Kiel University, and all future officials in the duchies were required to master the Danish language.

The school reform introduced by Generalsuperintendent Jacob Georg Christian Adler in 1814 standardized teaching content, raised educational standards, and enforced compulsory education more strictly than before. However, Danish was only intended as the language of instruction in rural schools in areas where Danish was the language of the church, but not in urban schools and in mixed-language areas. Although it took several decades for the reform to take hold, it ultimately led to a strengthening of German in North Schleswig as well. In Central Schleswig, the increasing literacy in High German accelerated the extinction of the Danish dialects, as the population realized that mastery of (High) German provided educational and thus social advancement opportunities, and parents therefore tended to speak German rather than Angle-Danish with their children.

With the Congress of Vienna in 1815, Holstein became part of the German Confederation. Denmark was required to treat both duchies equally and not to strengthen its hold on Schleswig. The language laws of 1807 and 1810 remained largely unheeded.

In order to gauge public opinion, Danish Councilor Jacob Brønnum Scavenius (1749–1820) set a prize question in 1815 on the history of the Danish language in Schleswig. The third part of the question, in particular, which asked how the Danish language could regain its position "as the oldest common language of the country" and "thus restore South Jutland to what it once was, a Danish province," caused offense among the "first political Schleswig-Holsteiners." As their mouthpiece, Niels Nikolaus Falck accused Scavenius of wanting to rob the German-speaking Schleswigers of their language and drive a wedge between the duchies. Nevertheless, three prize essays were submitted: In Ueber das Verhältnis der dänischen Sprache zur deutschen im Herzogthume Schleswig (1817), Pastor Ernst Christian Kruse (1764–1846) from Neumünster stated that the population in some areas, such as Angeln, spoke a language with echoes of Danish in everyday life, but rejected the introduction of Danish as the language of schooling and church services. In Ueber die dänische Sprache in Schleswig (1819), Pastor Nikolaus Outzen from Breklum, on the other hand, expressed his dismay that church services in areas where Danish was the native language were conducted in German. The prize was won by the "usual erudition" of the Danish-language work by conference council member Erich Christian Werlauff (1781–1871), lecturer in Nordic history at the University of Copenhagen, for his Forsøg til det danske Sprogs Historie i Hertugdømmet Slesvig, which, however, did not address the controversial third question at all.

==== The Schleswig-Holstein question of the 1830s and 1840s ====
In the 1830s, nationalist movements developed on both the Danish and German sides, which included the idea of a monolingual state with one official language. In his 1832 treatise Ueber Volksthümlichkeit und Staatsrecht des Herzogthums Schleswig nebst Blicken auf den ganzen dänischen Staat (On the Popularity and Constitutional Law of the Duchy of Schleswig, with a Look at the Entire Danish State), the Flensburg lawyer Christian Paulsen stated that Schleswig was constitutionally part of Denmark. Five years later, in Det danske sprog i hertugdømmet Slesvig (The Danish Language in the Duchy of Schleswig), he lamented the poor reputation of the Danish language and demanded that Danish be the language of schools and churches wherever Danish was the predominant everyday language. Half of the inhabitants of the duchy were Danish-speaking. This included the entire district of Flensburg, large parts of the districts of Gottorf and Tondern, in the northern part of which Danish was already the language of schools and churches, and Karrharde. Paulsen based his demand on the laws of 1807 and 1810. In 1838, the Foreningen til dansk Læsnings Fremme i Slesvig (Association for the Promotion of Danish Reading in Schleswig) was founded in Copenhagen, which promoted the dissemination of Danish literature by establishing lending libraries. In the same year, the anti-Schleswig-Holstein newspaper Dannevirke was published for the first time. Also in 1838, the Schleswig Assembly of Estates approved by a narrow majority a motion to make Danish the official language in Danish-speaking areas, whereupon Christian VIII enacted a law in 1840 introducing Danish as the legal and administrative language in North Schleswig, with both languages to be permitted in all official areas in mixed-language areas. Danish was to be taught instead of German in secondary schools in North Schleswig. German-speaking families in North Schleswig protested against the latter, demanding a daily German lesson, which was granted. In the following years, churches and schools in the mixed-language areas adapted very individually to the needs of the population. However, in addition to the skills of the preachers and teachers, their political attitudes remained decisive, because the requirement contained in the 1840 law that civil servants, preachers, and teachers acquire knowledge of the Danish language and use it in official communications was often circumvented by German-minded people. In North Schleswig, too, German remained the predominant language in many schools. Despite these concessions, leading German-speaking local politicians expressed concern that the law would jeopardize the unity of the duchies.

Over the next five years, nationalist propaganda intensified on both sides. A group of Danish liberals known as the Eider Danes sought to expand the kingdom to the Eider River, excluding Holstein, in view of Schleswig's centuries-long affiliation with Denmark. Pro-German Schleswigers, on the other hand, saw Schleswig as part of the German nation and, invoking the Up ewig ungedeelt clause in the Treaty of Ribe, demanded an independent Schleswig-Holstein within the German Confederation. For both parties, the use of their respective languages was a declaration of their nationality. With his language laws, King Christian VIII sought above all to minimize discontent in the duchies in order to hold the state together, but this aroused the displeasure of the Eider Danish faction. A survey conducted by the German Chancellery in 1846 revealed that Angeln Danish was largely extinct and that south of the Wiedau, Danish was only still spoken as a vernacular on the Geest ridge as far as Viöl.

The royal rescript of January 28, 1848, which transformed the previous personal union into a real union between Denmark and Schleswig, met with resistance from German nationalists. With the proclamation of the Provisional Government of the Duchies on March 24, 1848, the Schleswig-Holstein uprising began, known on the Danish side as the Treårskrigen (Three Years' War).

== Danish language policy after the Schleswig-Holstein uprising ==
With the armistice on July 10, 1849, the Duchy of Schleswig was effectively divided. The border ran between Gelting and Flensburg in the east and between Tønder and Højer in the west, which corresponded "roughly to the border between the loyal Danish-minded and the rebellious Schleswig-Holstein areas." In the northern part under Danish rule, the Eider Danish faction gained support and demanded annexation to the kingdom, while in the southern part under Prussian administration, the population considered itself German and sought admission to the German Confederation. With the Peace of Berlin on July 2, 1850, Prussia withdrew from Schleswig. Three weeks later, the Schleswig-Holstein army was defeated by the Danes in the Battle of Idstedt. As a result, the Duchy of Schleswig was once again entirely under Danish rule, which, under the influence of the Eider Danes, abandoned its previous policy of compromise.

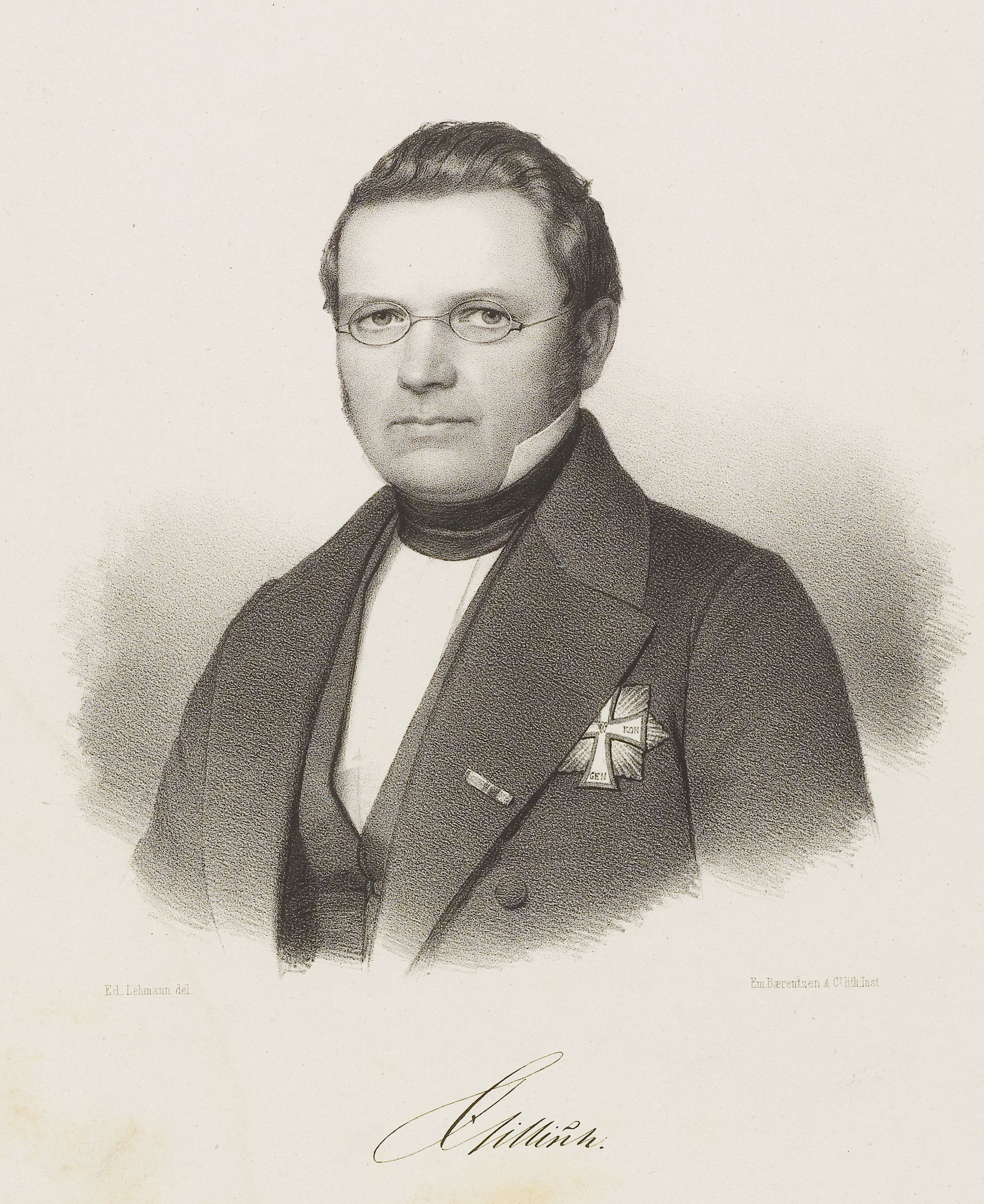
Frederik Ferdinand Tillisch

=== Tillisch government ===
Frederik Ferdinand Tillisch, who from 1849 onwards was a member of the three-person government commission in the Duchy of Schleswig, together with the Prussian representative Count Eulenberg and the English representative Colonel Hodges, became royal commissioner with absolute power in Schleswig in July 1850 and, from March 5, 1851, the first head of the newly founded Ministry for Schleswig, which was initially based in Flensburg. In his view, as in that of many Danes, the Schleswig-Holstein uprising was a civil war caused by rebellious officials. One of his first measures was therefore to dismiss pro-German officials. By the end of 1850, 243 officials had been dismissed, of whom only eleven were pardoned and retired with a pension. Those dismissed, including General Superintendent Johannes Andreas Rehhoff, the provosts, and around 75 preachers, representing about a quarter of the clergy in the duchy, as well as almost all teachers in Latin schools, lost their income and often had to leave the duchy within days. Despite the amnesty decree for Schleswig on May 10, 1851, more officials, preachers, and teachers were dismissed in the following years. The reasons for dismissal were not communicated directly to those affected, but were published in the church and school gazette, with no reason given for a fifth of all those dismissed. The dismissed were replaced by officials from the kingdom. Tillisch also intended to fill the vacant preaching positions on an interim basis with experienced preachers from North Schleswig, but despite the promise of additional income, the majority of them were not willing to do so. Therefore, young theologians from the kingdom who had studied at the University of Copenhagen were hired, even though they had no professional experience and often no knowledge of German.

Tillisch's goal was to establish as close a connection as possible between Schleswig and Denmark, thereby creating the greatest possible separation between the two duchies. In order to bind Schleswig more closely to the kingdom, he planned to "Danify" the region by spreading the Danish language, culture, customs, and traditions. The aim of these measures was also to reverse the shift from Jutish to Low German that had taken place in Central Schleswig over the previous decades. Tillisch entrusted his secretary August Regenburg (1815–1895) with the implementation of these measures.

=== August Regenburg ===
August Regenburg was from Aabenraa and had studied at the Sorø Academy under Casper Frederik Wegener, a virtually fanatical advocate of Danish nationalism who became the Danish government’s private archivist and historiographer in 1848. Wegener had a formative influence on Regenburg, and the two continued to correspond long after Regenburg’s student days. In 1842, Regenburg joined the Danish Chancellery, where he initially served as private secretary to the national-conservative politician P. C. Stemann. In 1849, Tillisch appointed him as his secretary and, on September 1, 1850, entrusted him with the administration of church, school, and educational affairs in Schleswig. Regenburg continued the dismissals of preachers and teachers that Tillisch had begun. He was encouraged in his efforts to restore the Danish language throughout the former Danish-speaking region by his former teacher Wegener. He deliberately ignored the results of the 1846 surveys, which had shown that the Danish-speaking area had shrunk considerably since the beginning of the century and that there was a significant difference between the local dialects and standard Danish. He also followed only in part a 1850 statement requested by Tillisch from the visitators of the affected deaneries, who recommended a gradual transition.

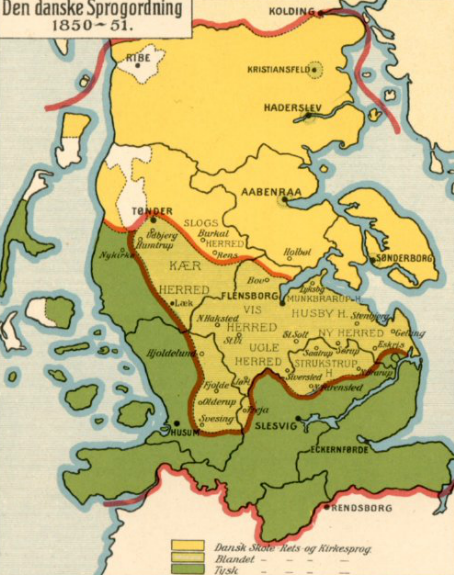
Danish Language Regulations of 1851: In the areas shaded in yellow, only Danish was recognized as the language of official business, schools, and the church; in the green areas, only German was recognized; and in the area in between, the languages were initially to be used alternately.

=== The decrees and their enforcement ===
The language decrees drafted by Regenburg took effect on February 7, 1851, in the Tondern district and the Flensburg deanery; on February 8, in the Husum and Bredstedt deaneries; and on March 4, in the Gottorf deanery. The decrees were initially communicated only to the preachers; they were not published in the Altonaer Mercur until April 2, 1851. They stipulated that, beginning with the summer semester starting at Easter 1851, Danish was to be the sole language of instruction in the civic and village schools. In the higher schools, students were given some time to learn enough Danish to follow the lessons. German was to be taught for only four hours a week. The Amtmann and the provost—mostly Danes following the wave of dismissals—had to act as church inspectors to ensure that the teachers were proficient in the Danish language and to procure Danish teaching materials for all schools. Church services were to alternate weekly between German and Danish sermons. For special occasions, parishioners were allowed to request the language in which they should be conducted. In mixed-language areas, those affected were to be allowed to choose which language was used in official matters and in court. These language decrees affected a total of 49 parishes, including the largely German-speaking city of Tondern.

In the towns of Haderslev, Aabenraa, and Sønderborg, where sermons had previously been delivered mostly in German, church services were to be conducted equally in both languages. Danish replaced German as the primary language of instruction, although German lessons continued to be taught. Danish became the sole official language. In Flensburg, where the Danish Holy Spirit Church had previously been merely a branch church without its own congregation and without the authority to perform religious rites, a free Danish congregation was formed in which anyone, regardless of nationality and without being bound to a specific parish—an absolute exception for that time, when church membership depended solely on one’s place of residence—could become a member. Danish schools for boys and girls were also founded in Flensburg. Even at the Domschule Schleswig, which was not located in the area affected by the decrees, Danish instruction became mandatory.

To ensure that all affected parishes received Danish-speaking pastors, even those German pastors in the mixed-language area who had not already been dismissed for anti-Danish or pro-Schleswig-Holstein statements were either retired or transferred to parishes in purely German-speaking areas. In the Flensburg district, only four of the 26 pastors remained. The positions were almost entirely filled with candidates from the University of Copenhagen. To ensure a supply of suitable Danish-speaking personnel in the future, the training regulations were amended: the requirement for future clergy in the duchies to complete a two-year course of study at Kiel University was abolished. In 1852, the examination regulations for theology candidates were amended so that, whereas previously half of the written exam questions were to be answered in Latin and half in German, they were now to be answered half in German and half in Danish, and a Danish trial sermon and catechism were added to the German ones.

Although teachers were not dismissed to the same extent as pastors, there was still a shortage of applicants, which is why Danish-speaking newcomers with no seminary training or knowledge of German were often hired. At the same time, some teachers remained in their posts and learned Danish on the job, either from the new pastor or from the assistant teacher assigned to them by the government. The Committee for the Establishment of Danish Public Libraries in Schleswig, founded in 1851, commissioned them to set up public and school libraries with a collection consisting mainly of Danish literature. The teacher training college in Tondern was converted entirely to Danish, while the opening of a German-language college in Eckernförde was delayed.

In the years that followed, further restrictions were imposed: in 1855, the four hours of German instruction at rural schools in linguistically mixed districts were abolished. The proportion of classes taught in Danish was also increased at secondary schools. Also starting in 1855, confirmation was to be conducted exclusively in Danish, as the Danish government viewed it primarily as a school graduation and not as a testimony of faith. Home schooling was prohibited if it resulted in children being deprived of Danish instruction at school. Action was also taken against Sunday schools conducted in German and even against family devotions as soon as people from outside the immediate household participated. In some cases, teachers were also prohibited from distributing the German-language Schleswig-Holsteinisches Schulblatt. To monitor the loyalty of the population, Danish pastors were expected to assess the attitudes of their parishioners based on church attendance—particularly at Danish-language sermons and communion services—and their willingness to send their children to school and to Danish confirmation classes.

Correspondence with higher authorities was to be conducted in Danish. Although no specific regulations had been issued regarding school and church records—including parish registers—by 1851, many Danish pastors kept their parish registers in Danish and, in some cases, adapted the names to the Danish spelling. Baptismal certificates and other documents were also frequently issued in Danish only.

=== Protests from congregations ===
From the very beginning, the Danish government’s measures met with strong resistance. The forced change in the language used in official business, schools, and churches was perceived as an attack on their identity, even though High German—now banned—was not spoken in everyday life. Even those in Schleswig who had sided with the Danes during the uprising and considered themselves loyal subjects of the Danish king felt betrayed by their government and now joined the opposition to the Danish state as a whole. The extent of the discontent is evident in the enormous number of 37,800 signatures on the numerous petitions against the rescripts, which were addressed to the king and the assembly of estates during the thirteen years they were in effect,—out of a population of about 80,000 people in the 49 parishes affected. In the view of Danish politicians, this flood of petitions originated largely from German-leaning preachers, which is why it was also referred to as the slesvigske præstekrig, or “Schleswig Priests’ War.” The dissatisfaction of South Schleswigers with Danish policy is also evidenced by the fact that with every election to the Estates Assembly, politicians loyal to Denmark received fewer votes.

The dismissal of the pastors, sextons, and teachers by the Danish government was perceived as an unlawful, arbitrary intervention by an occupying power in the village’s self-government and significantly reduced the willingness to accept the new preachers and teachers sent from the Kingdom—some of whom were even appointed directly by the government without the election customary in many parishes in southern Schleswig. Furthermore, many of the young preachers had no professional experience and often did not have a sufficient command of German to deliver the German sermon required every other Sunday. The Black Book on Danish Misrule in the Duchy of Schleswig, published in 1864, further listed—in a tone that was at times sensationalist—numerous examples of how pastors from the Kingdom harassed their German-speaking colleagues and congregations. For example, some Danish pastors allegedly attempted to increase the number of Danish-language religious services and the attendance at their Danish services and communion celebrations through bribery, such as waiving fees. To prevent parents from sending their children to purely German-speaking areas for confirmation, some Danish pastors allegedly refused to issue the necessary baptismal certificates. At times, local officials made the granting of various concessions—such as permits to operate inns—contingent on how pastors assessed their parishioners’ attitudes toward the language regulations. The congregations responded to the reprisals by boycotting church services, occasionally disrupting services, and suspending the payments in kind to which the pastors were entitled as part of their income. The general visitation of 1854–55 revealed a significantly lower attendance at Danish sermons in almost all congregations, with the exception of Süderlügum and Ladelund.

The parents of the schoolchildren also complained—less often about the lack of academic progress in the classes taught in parallel by the German-speaking schoolmaster and the Danish assistant teacher, and more often about the additional costs of purchasing Danish textbooks. A particular point of complaint, however, was that they could not understand what their children were learning in school, since most of them did not speak Standard Danish themselves. Many parents therefore saw their children’s religious education as being at risk, since they could not study the catechism with them due to the language barrier. Complaints also arose because knowledge of German was considered indispensable for everyday life and for future vocational training and employment. Even communities that were actually Danish-speaking requested additional German lessons for this reason. The requirement for Danish confirmation led to further waves of petitions.

==== Angeln ====
There were strong protests against the language decree, particularly in Angeln. The peninsula was divided roughly equally between the districts of Flensburg and Gottorf. In order to enforce the Danish language policy, nearly all pastors in the Flensburg district had been replaced, and about half in the Gottorf district. For decades, the growing interest in education—driven by increasing prosperity—had been promoting the spread of High German. As a result, Angeln Danish was replaced by Low German as the vernacular. In the 1846 survey, most pastors stated that only the elderly still spoke Danish. Yet even those who still spoke Angeln Danish barely understood the Imperial Danish that was to be introduced in schools and churches. In the parishes in the southeastern part of the peninsula, no one spoke the traditional mixed language at all. Nevertheless, Danish was to become the language of schools and churches there. In Gelting, Pastor Friedrich Wilhelm Valentiner of St. Catherine’s Church feared for the salvation of the Christians who would be deprived of their customary church services, and especially for the children, whose religious education would be neglected under the influence of Grundtvig’s liberal pedagogy. Even Peter Otzen, who was pro-Danish and had been appointed pastor of St. Nicholas Church in Quern by the Danish government in 1850 to replace a dismissed preacher, refused to preach in Danish to his German-speaking congregation. When the pastor of the neighboring church in Esgrus died in 1851, Valentiner attempted to prevent the appointment of a Danish successor. Because of his anti-Danish stance, he was consequently suspended by the new Danish district administrator, even though the latter had no jurisdiction over the exempt noble parish. Over the following years, the dispute continued to escalate. The patron, Baron von Hobe-Geltingen of the Gelting estate, delayed the implementation of the language decree in the Gelting schools and prevented the appointment of a new pastor even after Valentiner’s expulsion from Schleswig in 1854; the parish council members appealed to the Estates Assembly. All protests were in vain: in 1856, the Gelting landowners were stripped of their patronage rights, and a Danish pastor was installed without presentation or election.

In the 1850s, a Danish pastor was also appointed in about thirty of the roughly forty parishes in Angeln, most of them as early as 1850 following the dismissal of the previous, Schleswig-Holstein-aligned preachers. In several cases where the change in government coincided with the death of the incumbent, the successor elected by the congregation was also dismissed, since the election had taken place under the Provisional Government and the new incumbent had not taken an oath of office to the Danish government. Later, as in Esgrus in 1851, elections were prevented altogether. Many of the Danish preachers appointed left their parishes after a few years, likely also due to the poor reception they received in their new congregations.

==== Multilingual regions ====
Even in multilingual congregations, the decree was rarely well received. In very few places were Danish sermons well attended. More often, the German church language—even when it did not correspond to the everyday language—was regarded as virtually sacred. Consequently, holding church services in the vernacular was perceived as a desecration. Furthermore, the Danish dialects spoken in everyday life differed greatly from Standard Danish. Many people who were supposedly Danish speakers, as a frequent point in the petitions noted, understood “the higher Danish language” less well than the High German they had been accustomed to. In Klixbüll, for example, although the population spoke a mixture of North Frisian and Sønderjysk in everyday life, they did not understand the standard Danish language in which the sermon was to be delivered. Although the long-serving pastor Friedrich Wilhelm Matthiesen held the Danish-language services mandated every two weeks, the parishioners there, as elsewhere, refused to attend them. During an inspection by the church inspectors, it became apparent that the pastor did not even go to church on the Sundays designated for the Danish sermons. Matthiesen was dismissed in 1856. For the election of his successor, the government nominated three Danes, which is why the eligible farmers boycotted the election after the election sermons, which they did not understand. After the first Danish pastor resigned in 1860 and accepted a position in the Kingdom, the church council requested that the candidates in the next election deliver their trial sermons in German. This request was also refused.

=== Assessment of the measures from a Danish perspective ===
The Eider-Danish party, which sought to integrate all of Schleswig into the Kingdom, felt that the provisions of the language decrees did not go far enough. To provide scholarly support for this demand, Carl Ferdinand Allen, a historian at the University of Copenhagen, in Det danske Sprogs Historie i Hertugdömmet Slesvig eller Sönderjylland (1856/57) and its German translation Geschichte der dänischen Sprache im Herzogthum Schleswig oder Südjutland (1858), provided evidence that the Danish-speaking region actually extended as far as the Schlei. To this end, he analyzed crime statistics based on the language of the defendants and asked Danish officers whether the “innkeepers” with whom they had been quartered in the Duchy of Schleswig in 1851 had understood them. He blamed the dissatisfaction in the communities on the German pastors and officials, who imposed on the population the idea that German was the superior language and incited them against Danish language policy. The investigation into linguistic conditions in Central Holstein, initiated by the government in 1846 and 1850, in which pastors were asked to provide information on language use in their parishes, also influenced his assessment. However, from his national-romantic perspective, he partially distorted the reports by removing all German elements from the Angeln Danish language samples.

Attempts were even made to justify the measures using religious arguments. The Copenhagen pastor Friedrich Hammerich declared that replacing German pastors with Danish ones was absolutely necessary for the salvation of the population. He claimed that the Schleswig-Holstein Church Agenda of General Superintendent Adler from 1797 had corrupted the sacraments. A baptism according to Adler’s Agenda without exorcism was, at best, an emergency baptism. However, no rationalist agenda had been introduced in the kingdom, which is why the congregations were able to once again enjoy the pure doctrine through the Danish pastors and the Danish church ritual of 1685 that they brought with them. For German-language worship services, the 1665 church book by Adam Olearius—which had never been fully superseded due to the dispute over Adler’s 1797–98 Agenda and was committed to Lutheran orthodoxy—was republished in 1850.

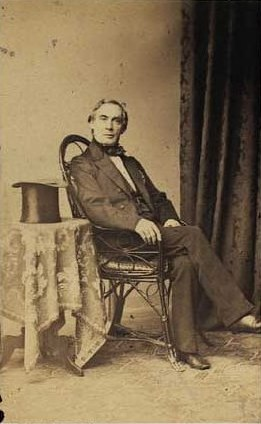
Harald Raasløff, Minister for Schleswig from 1854 to 1856

At the same time, there were moderate and conservative voices in Denmark—even within government circles—who opposed the language decrees because they feared that forced Danishification would undermine unity throughout the state. Minister of Culture Johan Nicolai Madvig, a member of the cabinet under Adam Wilhelm Moltke—which formed the government at the time the decrees were issued—even introduced German as a foreign language in the kingdom’s secondary schools during the same period. Harald Raasløff (1810–1893), Minister for Schleswig in the Bang government from December 1854, was critical of the Danish approach to the language issue. However, he was unable to prevail against the Eider-Danish Minister of Culture, Carl Christian Hall, with his attempt at a revision that would have exempted at least some municipalities where “only German had been spoken for more than a generation” from the regulations and was transferred to the Ministry of Holstein in February 1856. Under the pseudonym Theophilus, he wrote *Die schleswigsche Sprachsache* (1858), in which he argued that no coercion should be applied in the language question. Instead, he recommended dividing Schleswig along the language border into a German-speaking part, which was to be united with Holstein, and a Danish-speaking part, which was to be annexed to Denmark. This view was supported by Constant Dirckinck-Holmfeld, a proponent of the “unified state theory” and a promoter of the Danish language. In his view, the population’s shift toward the German language was their own decision and did not constitute an obstacle to state unity. Only the coercion stemming from the “party Scandinavism” of the Eider Danes would lead to division.

=== International criticism and political reaction ===
The language decrees and their often rigid enforcement immediately drew criticism from allied nations abroad. Under pressure from Russia, Tillich was forced to resign from his post as Minister for Schleswig as early as July 1851, after only three months in office. The London Protocol, signed on May 8, 1852, also ran counter to the Eider-Danish aspirations; in it, the European great powers—the United Kingdom, the Second French Republic, the Russian Empire, the Kingdom of Prussia, and the Austrian Empire agreed with the Scandinavian kingdoms of Sweden and Denmark that the duchies should remain independent entities and that Schleswig should not be constitutionally bound more closely to Denmark than Holstein. Danes and Germans were to have equal rights. Despite the London Protocol, however, the goal of the Eider-Danish government remained the integration of all of Schleswig into the Kingdom and a common constitution. Regenburg remained in office until 1864, and Tillich’s rapidly changing successors as Minister for Schleswig in the years leading up to 1864—whose seat had already been moved to Copenhagen in 1852—continued to enforce the language decrees regardless of all local and international protests. The sheer volume of petitions initially led to “petitioning” being banned in certain areas, particularly in the purely German-speaking communities in the Gottorf district. Assemblies were prohibited. The pro-Danish opposition denounced the petitions, claiming that some of the signatures had been obtained under pressure from the “powerful figures in the parish.” In the Schleswig Estates Assembly, the restoration of the old language arrangements failed to gain a majority. In one area, however, the protests were successful: under pressure from numerous petitions, on January 9, 1861, confirmation was once again declared a church ceremony, and the choice of language was left open. At Easter of that same year, 422 of the 471 confirmed youths in Angeln were confirmed in German. The 49 Danish confirmands were almost all children of Danish civil servants. The same decree also reinstated German-language home schooling.

== Consequences ==
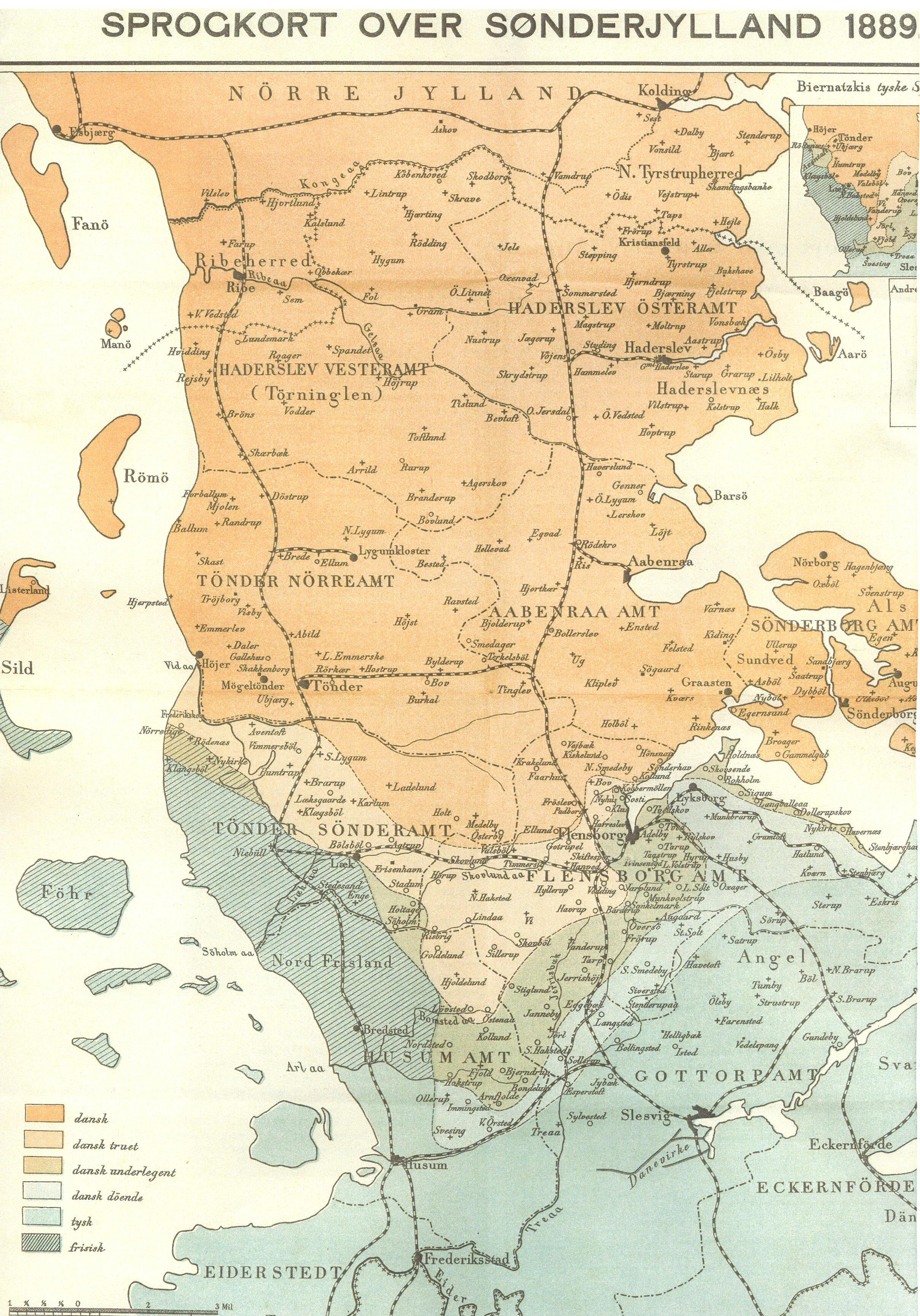
Language map based on Clausen's 1889 work; the so-called Clausen Line is shown as a dashed line.

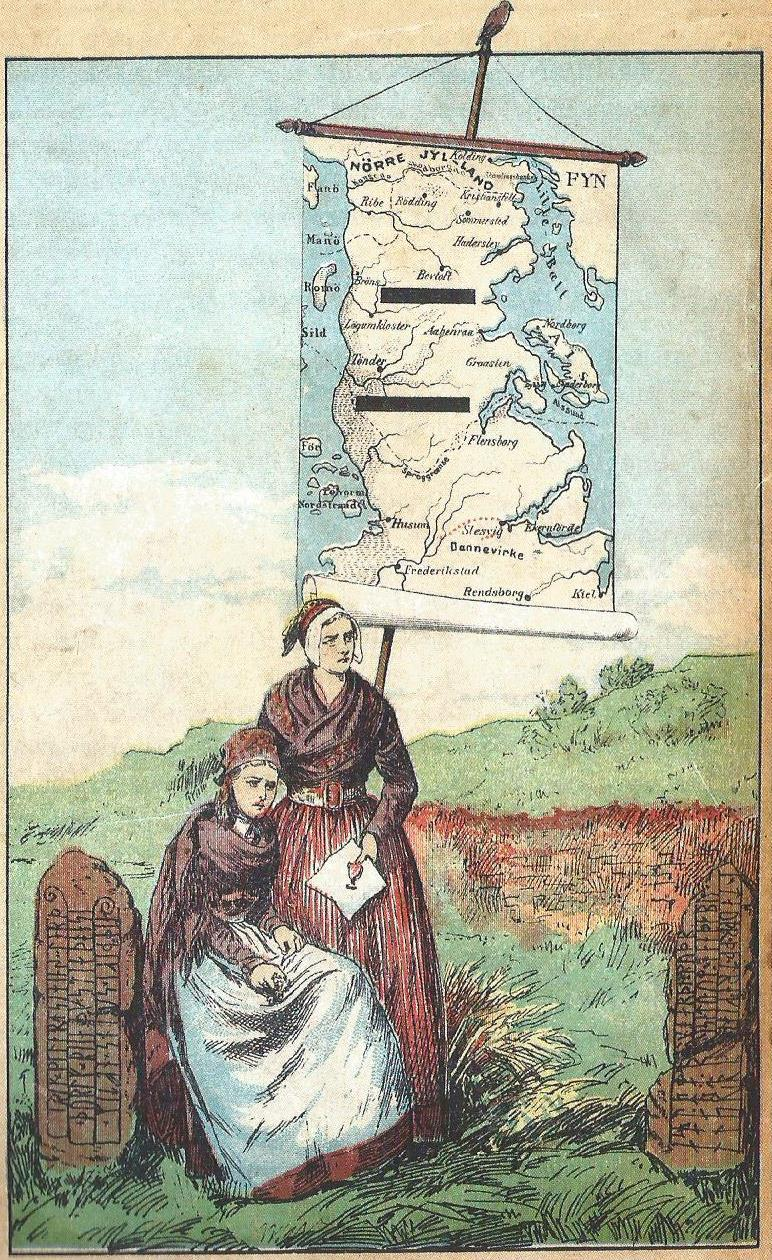
Two girls in traditional Föhr and Als costumes stand next to runestones at the Waldemarsmauer; behind them is a map in which black bars symbolize the 1895 ban on using the name “Sønderjylland” for North and Central Schleswig. The language border is marked south of Flensburg, but it no longer extends nearly as far into Central Schleswig as it did on maps from around 1845.

Despite local and international criticism, the language decrees remained in effect until 1864. In the Duchy of Schleswig, they fostered anti-Danish sentiment. Denmark’s reputation also suffered abroad. The violation of the London Protocol by the November Constitution of 1863, which fully integrated Schleswig into the Kingdom, led to the Federal Intervention of 1863 and the German-Danish War of 1864. Following Denmark’s defeat, most of the officials, clergy, and teachers sent from the Danish Kingdom were dismissed as early as 1864. German once again became the language of instruction in schools where it had been prior to 1851, although in some municipalities with a large Danish-speaking population, a vote was permitted. A large majority voted in favor of German as the language of instruction and worship. Only in Süderlügum, Braderup, Karlum, Ladelund, and Medelby did the weekly alternation between German and Danish church services continue. The Free Danish Congregation in Flensburg was dissolved, but Danish-language services at the Holy Spirit Church were retained. The Danish public school in Flensburg, which had already lost many students with the departure of Danish civil servants, was permitted to admit only children of Danish parents, who first had to pass a language test.

The Peace of Prague of August 23, 1866, promised the people of North Schleswig a referendum on their affiliation with Denmark. Nevertheless, Prussia annexed the duchies in 1867 as the province of Schleswig-Holstein. Despite a majority for pro-Danish candidates in the Reichstag elections of February and August 1867, there was no longer any mention of the referendum envisaged in 1866; instead, the “North Schleswig Clause” was repealed on April 13, 1878, through a treaty between Prussia and Austria. The Danish language in North Schleswig was suppressed. With the Language Decree of 1871, the Business Language Decree of 1876, the Order of 1878, and a further ordinance of 1888, High German became the sole language of administration, education, and worship in the Prussian province. From 1888 onward, Danish was finally permitted only in first grade and in the two weekly hours of religious instruction; Danish private schools were also closed. Although teachers and preachers were trained in Danish-language religious instruction at the seminary in Haderslev, the children’s proficiency in Imperial Danish declined. Schleswig was thus increasingly integrated into the German “fatherland” in linguistic terms as well. The South Jutlandic dialects in Central Schleswig disappeared almost entirely during the Prussian period; only in a few villages on the Schleswig Geest did a dialect—derided as “Potato Danish”—survive.

In North Schleswig, however, Sønderjysk remained the language of the people and of everyday life. In response to “Germanisation,” the Danish-speaking population organized into associations dedicated to preserving the Danish language and culture, which were viewed with suspicion by the Prussian government. Schleswig-Holstein nationalists, in turn, emphasized the unity of the former duchies. In 1895, the name Sønderjylland was banned for North Schleswig. Ernst von Köller, the province’s chief administrator from 1897 to 1901, had servants who had immigrated from Denmark and locals with Danish passports—so-called “optants”—deported and banned Danish associations. Starting in 1908, the Reich Association Act stipulated that even private events and association meetings in areas where fewer than 60% of residents were native German speakers had to be held in German. Increasingly, the use of the everyday language became a matter of national allegiance. The singing of certain Danish songs classified as nationalistic was banned—but not the printing and sale of songbooks.

In 1889, the Danish historian, demographer, and geographer Hans Victor Clausen published a language map based on earlier studies and his own surveys, in which he proposed a dividing line between the German and Danish populations. In the 1920 Schleswig plebiscites, the region was then divided along the Clausen Line, which lay almost exactly on the dividing line between the German and Danish languages used in churches and schools around 1800 and largely corresponded to the border proposed by Harald Raasløff in 1858.

== Historical context ==
The ideal of the nation-state, which had been developing since the 18th century, was closely linked to the concept of a common homeland shared by the people of the state. This also included the demand for a unified language and culture as an expression of national identity. In France, the promotion of Langue d’oïl as the national language began as early as the mid-18th century in the wake of centralization under Louis XIV. As a result, the regional and vernacular languages Occitan and Franco-Provençal were subsequently pushed back in many places. In the context of the revolutions of 1848, the national-romantic idea of a unified national language that distinguished the nation from other peoples spread throughout Europe. In Norway, which had become independent from Denmark following the Congress of Vienna, the desire for a distinct language separate from Danish even led to the emergence of two Norwegian languages in the mid-19th century: Landsmål (today Nynorsk), formed from dialects largely free of Danish linguistic influences and previously unwritten, and Bokmål (called Riksmål before 1929), which differed from Danish primarily in its spelling, which was adapted to pronunciation.

In the context of the decline of large multi-ethnic states, many countries sought to assimilate their minorities into the majority population. The Magyarization of the Kingdom of Hungary, for example, was part of this trend. The Kingdom of Prussia, too, rigorously pursued a policy of a unified imperial language. Thus, in the Lower Rhine regions of Kleve and Prussian Guelders, which had reverted to Prussia in 1815, the use of the minority language Dutch was banned in schools starting in 1827, though it remained in use as a church language until the end of the 19th century. In the province of Posen, which also came under Prussian rule following the Congress of Vienna, the Polish language, by contrast, dominated and remained on an equal footing with German. It was not until after the 1848 uprising that Posen lost its special privileges. In 1852, German was introduced there as the language of the courts. In schools, similar to the provisions in the Danish language regulations for German, Polish was permitted only for first-year students and in religious education. When religious education was also to be taught in German in 1901, the Września children strike broke out.

== Bibliography ==
- Carl Ferdinand Allen, Professor für Geschichte der Universität Kopenhagen: Geschichte der dänischen Sprache im Herzogthum Schleswig oder Südjütland. Band 1, Druck und Verlag des Königlichen Taubstummen Instituts, Schleswig 1857. Onlinedarstellung eines Exemplars des Havard College bei Google Books. Band 2, Verlag des Königlichen Taubstummen Instituts, Schleswig 1858. Ebenfalls komplett Online durch ein Ex. des Harvard College. (Zeitgenössische Behandlung der Zeit ab 1800 aus dänischer Sicht.)
- Jochen Bracker: Die dänische Sprachpolitik 1850–1864 und die Bevölkerung Mittelschleswigs. In: Zeitschrift der Gesellschaft für Schleswig-Holsteinische Geschichte 97 (1972), S. 127–226 und 98 (1973), pp. 87–214.
- Hans Schultz Hansen: Demokratie oder Nationalismus. Politische Geschichte Schleswig-Holsteins 1830–1918. In: Ulrich Lange (Hrsg.): Geschichte Schleswig-Holsteins. Neumünster 1996, pp. 427–486.
- Anna Havinga und Nils Langer (Hrsg.): Invisible Languages in the nineteenth century. Peter Lang, Bern 2015.
- Lars N. Henningsen: Unter Dänemark. In: Ders. (Hrsg.): Zwischen Grenzkonflikt und Grenzfrieden. Die dänische Minderheit in Schleswig-Holstein in Geschichte und Gegenwart. Studieafdelingen ved Dansk Centralbibliotek for Sydslesvig Nr. 65. Flensburg 2011, pp. 11–48 (pdf, accessed 23 September 2021).
- Manfred Hinrichsen: Die Entwicklung der Sprachverhältnisse im Landesteil Schleswig. Neumünster 1984.
- Nils Langer: Language Policies in the Duchy of Schleswig under Denmark and Prussia. In: Roisin Healy und Enrico dal Lago (Hrsg.): The Shadows of Colonialism in Europe’s Modern Past. Basingstoke: Palgrave Macmillan. 2014, pp. 73–91.
- L. S. Ravn: Lærerne under Sprogreskripterne 1851–1864. Sydslesvigske År Og Dage. Hrsg. von Poul Kürstein. Flensborg 1971.
- Jürgen Rohweder: Sprache und Nationalität. Nordschleswig und die Anfänge der dänischen Sprachpolitik in der ersten Hälfte des 19. Jahrhunderts. Glückstadt 1976.
- Schwarzbücher über die Dänische Missregierung im Herzogthum Schleswig (PDF). Schwers’sche Buchhandlung. 1864. – A very detailed, if at times somewhat sensationalist, contemporary account from a German perspective:

- Issue 1: Absetzung deutscher und Anstellung dänischer Geistlicher, Organisten, Küster, Lehrer.
- Issue 2: Kirche und Schule im Dienste der Danisirungsbestrebungen.
- Issue 3: Rechtsverletzungen : rechtswidrige Amtsentsetzungen. Rechtswidrige Eingriffe in politische Rechte. Verschiedene andere Rechtsverletzungen.
- Issue 4: Polizeiliche Willkür und Chicanen.
- Issue 5: Sportelsucht der dänischen Beamten. - Unfug bei der Verurtheilung zu Geldbrüchen und Gerichtskosten. - Verschiedenes.

- Friedrich Wilhelm Valentiner: Das dänische Kirchenregiment im Herzogthum Schleswig. Erfahrungen, der evangelisch-lutherischen Kirche gewidmet. Leipzig 1857 – A report by a German pastor who was personally affected, including his correspondence.
