= Rodenas =

Rodenas may refer to:

- Ródenas, a municipality in Teruel, Spain
- Rodenäs, a municipality in Schleswig-Holstein, Germany
- Alejandra Rodenas (born 1963), Argentine lawyer, judge, professor, and politician
- Clementina Ródenas (born 1949), Spanish politician

== See also ==
- Inés Rodena (1905–1985), Cuban writer
