= Momme Andresen =

German chemist (1857–1951)

Dr. Momme Andresen
- Born: 17 October 1857; Risum, Duchy of Schleswig, Denmark
- Died: 12 January 1951 (aged 93); Dagebüll, Schleswig-Holstein, West Germany
- Education: Technische Hochschule Dresden; University of Jena
- Known for: Inventing Rodinal
- Scientific career
- Fields: Chemistry
- Academic advisors: Rudolf Schmitt

Momme Andresen (German: [ˈmɔmə ʔanˈdʁeːzn̩], Danish: [ˈmʌmə ænˈtʁeˀsn̩]; 17 October 1857 – 12 January 1951) was a Danish-German industrial research chemist. His main area of work was to formulate better developers and fixers for black-and-white photographs.

== Biography ==
Andresen attended a Volksschule (a local state school) in Niebüll, Schleswig-Holstein, near his birthplace. He studied chemistry at the Technische Hochschule Dresden under Rudolf Schmitt. After doctoral studies at the University of Jena, he returned to Dresden to work as Schmitt's assistant.

His first independent scientific work was to determine the structure of the dyestuff safranin, for the German chemical company Cassella. Around that time, he also discovered "Andresen's acid". (Note: The product claimed in US 405,938, 1-hydroxynapthalene-3,8-disulphonic acid, has been called "Andresensche Säure" and "Andresen Säure" (i.e. Andresen's acid).) He worked for some years in Buffalo, New York. In 1887, he took employment at Aktien-Gesellschaft für Anilinfabrikation (modern AGFA) in Berlin as a dyestuff chemist.

He was already a keen amateur photographer. He had used, and was dissatisfied with, developers based on hydroquinone (which had been introduced in 1880). In 1889, AGFA set up a photographic research unit in Berlin, with Andresen as its head. His goal was to devise photographic developers which could be stored as stable liquid concentrates which could be diluted for use when needed, rather than having to be made up from several ingredients on the spot. He worked on formulations based on p-phenylenediamine and p-aminophenol, among other aromatic amines. He discovered a useful formulation based on p-aminophenol. On 27 January 1891, a German patent application describing and claiming it was filed. That application was granted as German patent DE 60,174. Corresponding patents were granted in other countries, including FR 211,243, GB 1,736/1891 and US 477,486. (Note: The Paris Convention for the Protection of Industrial Property was signed on 20 March 1883. Under it, a patent applicant in a signatory state can (for a limited time – in modern times, 12 months) claim a right of priority from an application filed in another signatory state. Germany did not sign the Convention until 1903 (see List of parties to international patent treaties). Those foreign applications therefore cannot have been Convention applications.) AGFA commercialised the formulation under the trade name Rodinal. Rodinal was still in use more than a century after its invention.

In 1892. he turned his attention to dry plate (gelatin process) photography. That process had been invented in 1871, and commercialised in 1879. It had problems; including inconsistent results and halation (German: Lichthof). In 1895, he had a part in devising improvements to the process which led to AGFA commercialising a product in 1898 which both gave better results and was quicker to develop than anything used before. It was especially useful in X-ray photography.

In 1940, the University of Jena awarded him an honorary doctorate.

He wrote at least one poem in his native North Frisian dialect.

== Publications ==
- US patent 405938, Momme Andresen, "Manufacture of a New Alpha-Napthol-Disulphonic Acid", issued 25 June 1889, assigned to Actien-Gesellschaft für Anilinfabrikation.
- US patent 475372, Momme Andrésen, "Process of Developing Photographic Pictures", issued 24 May 1892
- US patent 477486, Momme Andresen, "Photographic Developer", issued 21 June 1892
- US patent 641919, Momme Andresen & Ernst Leupold, "Process of Intensifying Photographs", issued 23 January 1900, assigned to Actien-Gesellschaft für Anilinfabrikation
- US patent 814503, Momme Andreson; Otto Magerstedt & Gerhard Ollendorff, "Receptacle", issued 6 May 1906, assigned to Actien-Gesellschaft für Anilinfabrikation
- Das latente Lichtbild, seine Entstehung und Entwicklung. Knapp, Halle (1913)
- Über lichthoffreie und farbenempfindliche Platten. Agfa, Berlin (1916)
- Über photographische Entwickler. Agfa, Berlin (undated)
- Über photographische Hilfsmittel im Negativ- und Positiv-Prozess. Agfa, Berlin (undated)
- Winke für die Blitzlicht-Photographie. Agfa, Berlin (undated)
- Agfa Photo-Handbuch. I. G. Farbenindustrie AG, Berlin (1930)
