= Leck Air Base =

Former air base in Leck, Germany

Leck Air Base Fliegerhorst Leck
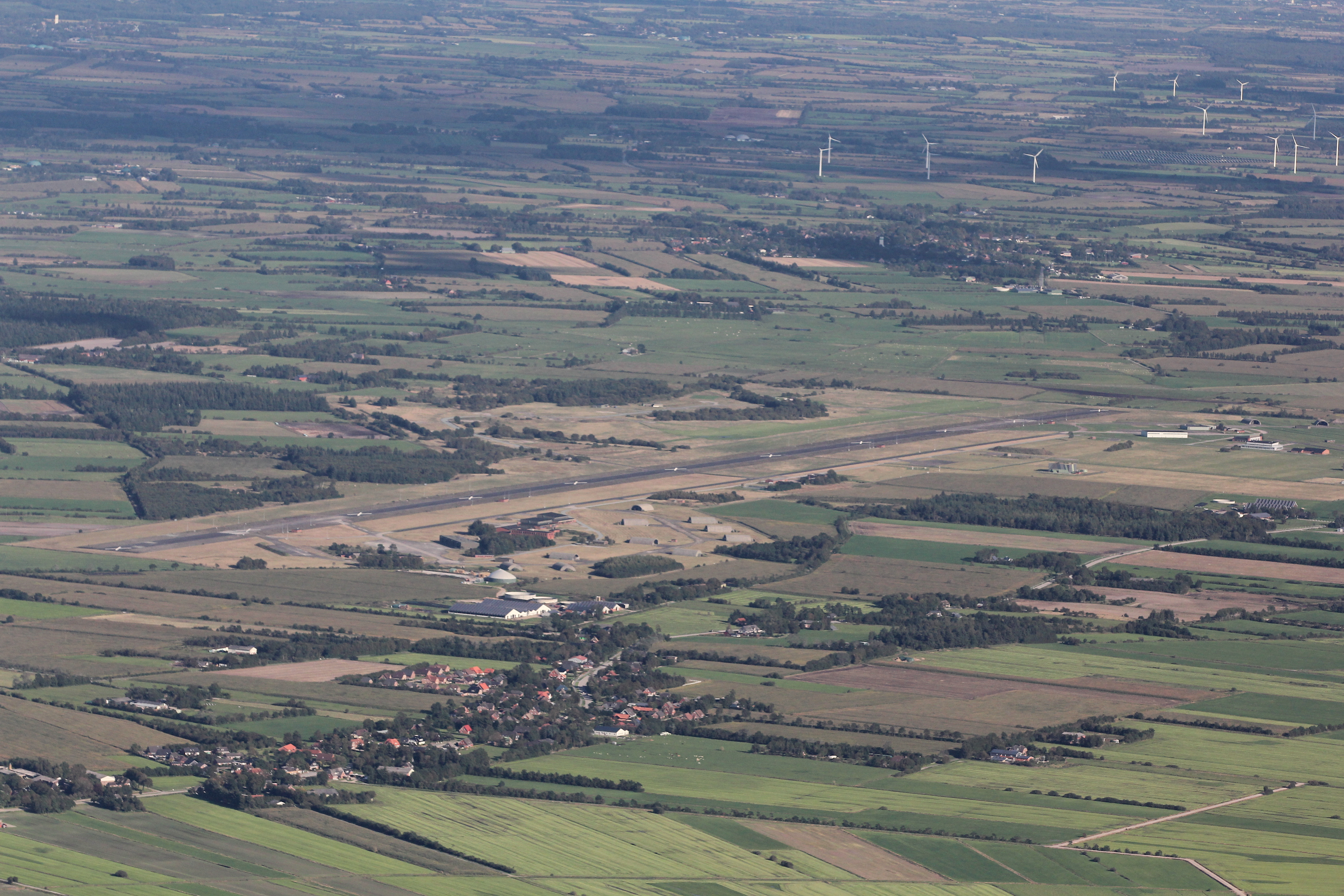
- IATA: none; ICAO: EDXK

Summary
- Airport type: Public
- Serves: Leck, Germany
- Location: Leck
- Elevation AMSL: 15 ft (4.6 m)
- Coordinates: 54°47′35″N 008°56′54″E
- Interactive map of Leck Air Base

Runways
Direction	Length		Surface
Direction	ft	m	Surface
	7,980	2,432	Asphalt

Leck Air Base is located in Leck, Germany. It was closed as a military airport but a small portion remains open to public use. It was an important base during the Cold War because it served as an overflow to nearby bases. At Leck, ground and support crews from the United States and West Germany exchanged duties, learning how to perform aircraft maintenance and operational support tasks.

Between 1994 and 2012 it was home to German Air Force surface-to-air missile units, operating MIM-23 Hawk and Roland missiles, but is now inhabited by an electronic warfare battalion of the Joint Support Service.
