= Süderlügum =

Süderlügum Sønder Løgum
- Municipality
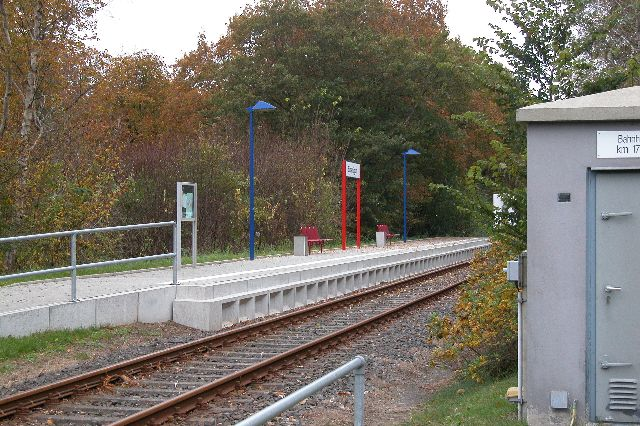
- Bahnhof Suderlugum

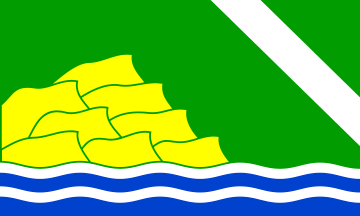
- Flag Coat of arms

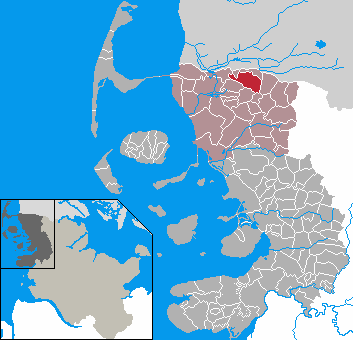
- Location of Süderlügum; Sønder Løgum within Nordfriesland district
- Interactive map of Süderlügum; Sønder Løgum
- Location within Germany Location within Schleswig-Holstein
- Coordinates: 54°52′N 8°55′E
- Country: Germany
- State: Schleswig-Holstein
- District: Nordfriesland
- Municipal assoc.: Südtondern

Government
  - Mayor: Rainer Eggers (CDU)

Area
  - Total: 26.59 km^{2} (10.27 sq mi)
- Elevation: 14 m (46 ft)

Population (2025-12-31)
  - Total: 2,280
  - Density: 85.7/km^{2} (222/sq mi)
- Time zone: UTC+01:00 (CET)
  - Summer (DST): UTC+02:00 (CEST)
- Postal codes: 25923
- Dialling codes: 0 46 63
- Vehicle registration: NF
- Website: www.suederluegum.de

Süderlügum (Danish: Sønder Løgum; Mooring North Frisian: Läigem or Sööderläigem; Wiedingharde North Frisian: Leegem) is a municipality in the district of Nordfriesland, in Schleswig-Holstein, Germany. It is situated near the border with Denmark, approximately 35 km west of Flensburg, and 7 km southeast of Tønder.

Süderlügum is part of the amt (collective municipality) of Südtondern.

== Transportation ==
Süderlügum lies on the Marsh Railway and offers connections to Niebüll and Tondern.
