= Südtondern =

- Amt
- Flag Coat of arms

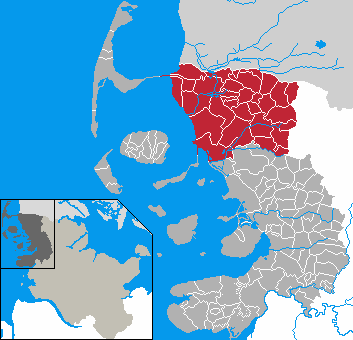
- Map of Nordfriesland highlighting Südtondern
- Interactive map of Südtondern
- Location within Germany Location within Schleswig-Holstein
- Coordinates: 54°47′N 8°49′E
- Country: Germany
- State: Schleswig-Holstein
- District: Nordfriesland
- Founded: 2008
- Seat: Niebüll
- Subdivisions: 30 municipalities

Government
  - Mayor: Ingo Böhm

Area
  - Total: 594.45 km^{2} (229.52 sq mi)

Population (2025-12-31)
  - Total: 40,327
  - Density: 67.839/km^{2} (175.70/sq mi)
- Time zone: UTC+01:00 (CET)
  - Summer (DST): UTC+02:00 (CEST)
- Website: www.amt-suedtondern.de

Südtondern is an Amt ("collective municipality") in the district of Nordfriesland, in Schleswig-Holstein, Germany. In addition to the main seat in Niebüll, there are offices in Leck, Risum-Lindholm and Süderlügum.

== History ==
The Amt was formed on 1 January 2008 from the former Ämter Bökingharde, Karrharde, Süderlügum and Wiedingharde, and the municipalities Niebüll and Leck.

== Subdivision ==
The Amt Südtondern consists of the following municipalities:

1. Achtrup
2. Aventoft
3. Bosbüll
4. Braderup
5. Bramstedtlund
6. Dagebüll
7. Ellhöft
8. Emmelsbüll-Horsbüll
9. Enge-Sande
10. Friedrich-Wilhelm-Lübke-Koog
11. Galmsbüll
12. Holm
13. Humptrup
14. Karlum
15. Klanxbüll
16. Klixbüll
17. Ladelund
18. Leck
19. Lexgaard
20. Neukirchen
21. Niebüll
22. Risum-Lindholm
23. Rodenäs
24. Sprakebüll
25. Stadum
26. Stedesand
27. Süderlügum
28. Tinningstedt
29. Uphusum
30. Westre
