= Achtrup =

Achtrup Agtrup / Åktoorp
- Municipality
- Coat of arms

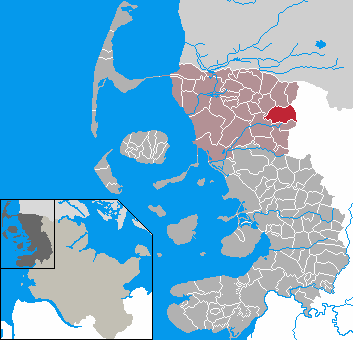
- Location of Achtrup within Nordfriesland district
- Interactive map of Achtrup
- Location within Germany Location within Schleswig-Holstein
- Coordinates: 54°47′N 9°2′E
- Country: Germany
- State: Schleswig-Holstein
- District: Nordfriesland
- Municipal assoc.: Südtondern

Government
  - Mayor: Hannelore Schulze

Area
  - Total: 29.90 km^{2} (11.54 sq mi)
- Elevation: 22 m (72 ft)

Population (2025-12-31)
  - Total: 1,532
  - Density: 51.24/km^{2} (132.7/sq mi)
- Time zone: UTC+01:00 (CET)
  - Summer (DST): UTC+02:00 (CEST)
- Postal codes: 25917
- Dialling codes: 04662
- Vehicle registration: NF

Achtrup (Danish: Agtrup; North Frisian: Åktoorp) is a municipality in Nordfriesland district, in Schleswig-Holstein in northern Germany.

Besides standard German, Low German and South Jutlandic, a Danish dialect, are still spoken in the area.
