= Humptrup =

Humptrup Humtrup
- Municipality
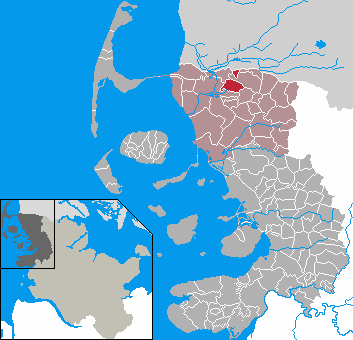
- Location of Humptrup; Humtrup within Nordfriesland district
- Interactive map of Humptrup; Humtrup
- Location within Germany Location within Schleswig-Holstein
- Coordinates: 54°52′N 8°52′E
- Country: Germany
- State: Schleswig-Holstein
- District: Nordfriesland
- Municipal assoc.: Südtondern

Government
  - Mayor: Andreas Heinsen

Area
  - Total: 16.99 km^{2} (6.56 sq mi)
- Elevation: 7 m (23 ft)

Population (2025-12-31)
  - Total: 756
  - Density: 44.5/km^{2} (115/sq mi)
- Time zone: UTC+01:00 (CET)
  - Summer (DST): UTC+02:00 (CEST)
- Postal codes: 25923
- Dialling codes: 04663
- Vehicle registration: NF
- Website: www.amt-suedtondern.de

Humptrup (Danish: Humtrup) is a municipality in the district of Nordfriesland, in Schleswig-Holstein, Germany.
