= Westre =

Westre Vestre
- Municipality
- Coat of arms

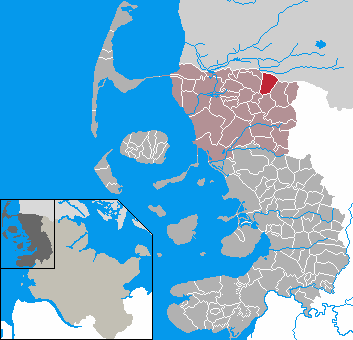
- Location of Westre; Vestre within Nordfriesland district
- Interactive map of Westre; Vestre
- Location within Germany Location within Schleswig-Holstein
- Coordinates: 54°51′N 8°58′E
- Country: Germany
- State: Schleswig-Holstein
- District: Nordfriesland
- Municipal assoc.: Südtondern

Government
  - Mayor: Peter Max Hansen

Area
  - Total: 19.13 km^{2} (7.39 sq mi)
- Elevation: 17 m (56 ft)

Population (2025-12-31)
  - Total: 353
  - Density: 18.5/km^{2} (47.8/sq mi)
- Time zone: UTC+01:00 (CET)
  - Summer (DST): UTC+02:00 (CEST)
- Postal codes: 25926
- Dialling codes: 04666
- Vehicle registration: NF
- Website: www.amt-suedtondern.de

Westre (Danish: Vestre) is a municipality in the district of Nordfriesland, in Schleswig-Holstein, Germany.
