= Uphusum =

Uphusum Ophusum
- Municipality
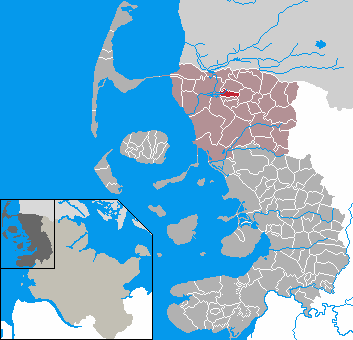
- Location of Uphusum; Ophusum within Nordfriesland district
- Interactive map of Uphusum; Ophusum
- Location within Germany Location within Schleswig-Holstein
- Coordinates: 54°51′N 8°50′E
- Country: Germany
- State: Schleswig-Holstein
- District: Nordfriesland
- Municipal assoc.: Südtondern

Government
  - Mayor: Magdalene Breckling

Area
  - Total: 7.06 km^{2} (2.73 sq mi)
- Elevation: 4 m (13 ft)

Population (2025-12-31)
  - Total: 330
  - Density: 47/km^{2} (120/sq mi)
- Time zone: UTC+01:00 (CET)
  - Summer (DST): UTC+02:00 (CEST)
- Postal codes: 25923
- Dialling codes: 04663
- Vehicle registration: NF
- Website: www.amt-suedtondern.de

Uphusum (Danish: Ophusum) is a municipality in the district of Nordfriesland, in Schleswig-Holstein, Germany.
