= Aventoft =

- Municipality
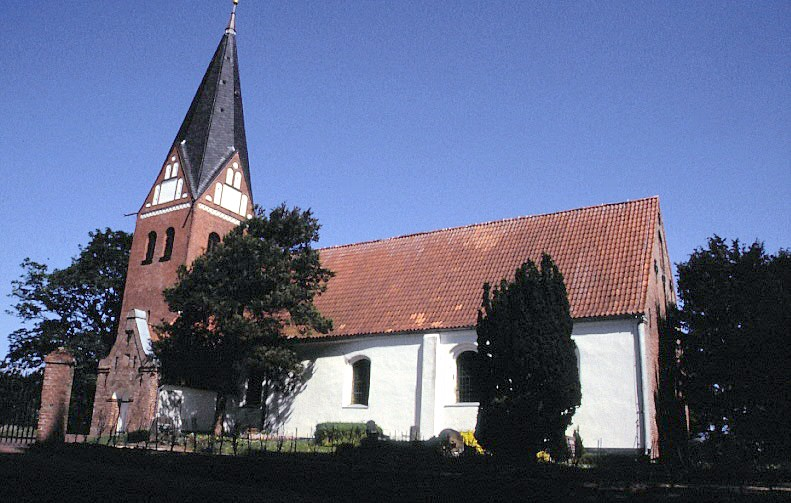
- The church at Aventoft

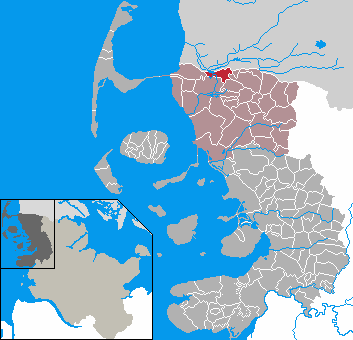
- Location of Aventoft within Nordfriesland district
- Interactive map of Aventoft
- Location within Germany Location within Schleswig-Holstein
- Coordinates: 54°53′N 8°49′E
- Country: Germany
- State: Schleswig-Holstein
- District: Nordfriesland
- Municipal assoc.: Südtondern

Area
  - Total: 14.47 km^{2} (5.59 sq mi)

Population (2025-12-31)
  - Total: 404
  - Density: 27.9/km^{2} (72.3/sq mi)
- Time zone: UTC+01:00 (CET)
  - Summer (DST): UTC+02:00 (CEST)
- Vehicle registration: NF
- Website: www.aventoft.de

Aventoft (North Frisian: Oowentoft) is a municipality in the district of Nordfriesland, in Schleswig-Holstein, Germany. The village is ethnically Danish with a Frisian minority.

== History ==
The place name was first recorded in writing in the 15th century. It is composed of the Danish -toft (“homestead, settlement site”) and the genitive of the personal name des Aghni (from Old Danish Aghni, Old Norse Agni). The hamlet of Klindt was first documented in 1674 as klint, referring to an elevation west of Aventoft Church (Danish klint meaning “hill” or “slope”).

The name Verlath derives from Dutch dike builders and goes back to Middle Dutch verlaten meaning “to let through.” It designated the sluices used for draining the Gotteskoog at the southern edge of the Ruttebüll Lake. The name is first recorded around 1707. The dialectal prefix Vi- reflects Danish-Jutish pronunciation.

== See also ==
- Danish minority of Southern Schleswig
