= Enge-Sande =

- Municipality
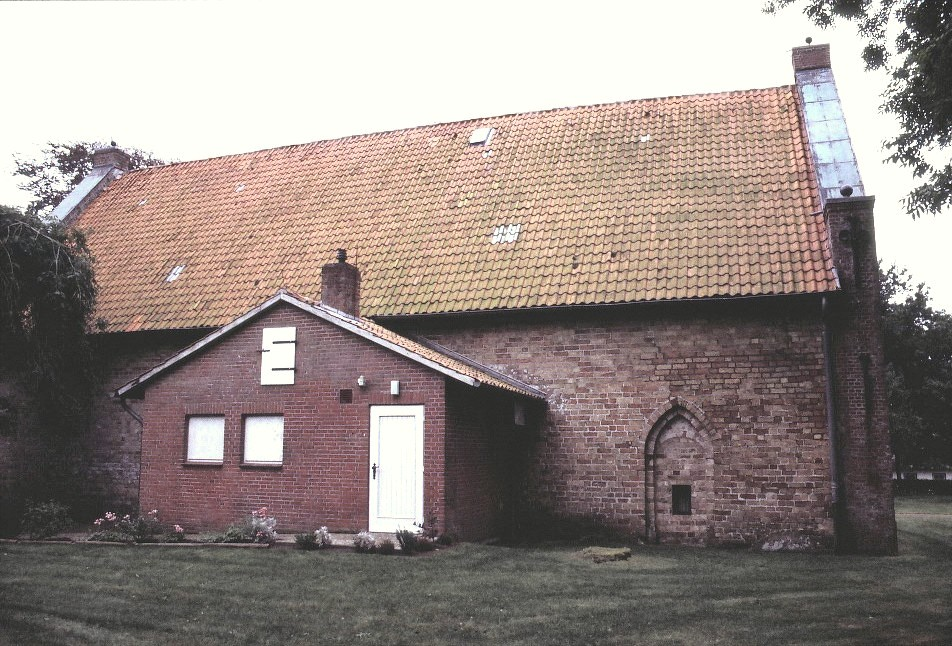
- The church at Enge

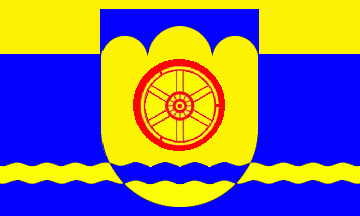
- Flag Coat of arms

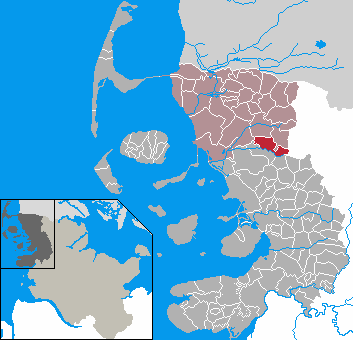
- Location of Enge-Sande within Nordfriesland district
- Interactive map of Enge-Sande
- Location within Germany Location within Schleswig-Holstein
- Coordinates: 54°44′N 8°58′E
- Country: Germany
- State: Schleswig-Holstein
- District: Nordfriesland
- Municipal assoc.: Südtondern

Government
  - Mayor: Peter Petersen

Area
  - Total: 24.82 km^{2} (9.58 sq mi)
- Elevation: 11 m (36 ft)

Population (2025-12-31)
  - Total: 1,194
  - Density: 48.11/km^{2} (124.6/sq mi)
- Time zone: UTC+01:00 (CET)
  - Summer (DST): UTC+02:00 (CEST)
- Postal codes: 25917
- Dialling codes: 04662, 04672
- Vehicle registration: NF
- Website: www.enge-sande.de

Enge-Sande is a municipality in the district of Nordfriesland, in Schleswig-Holstein, Germany.
