= Lexgaard =

Lexgaard Læksgaarde / Leeksguurd
- Municipality
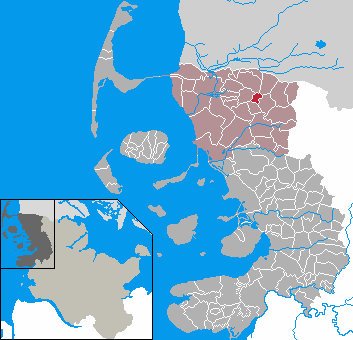
- Location of Lexgaard; Læksgaarde / Leeksguurd within Nordfriesland district
- Interactive map of Lexgaard; Læksgaarde / Leeksguurd
- Location within Germany Location within Schleswig-Holstein
- Coordinates: 54°50′N 8°57′E
- Country: Germany
- State: Schleswig-Holstein
- District: Nordfriesland
- Municipal assoc.: Südtondern

Government
  - Mayor: Günter Nielsen

Area
  - Total: 5.24 km^{2} (2.02 sq mi)
- Elevation: 9 m (30 ft)

Population (2025-12-31)
  - Total: 65
  - Density: 12/km^{2} (32/sq mi)
- Time zone: UTC+01:00 (CET)
  - Summer (DST): UTC+02:00 (CEST)
- Postal codes: 25923
- Dialling codes: 04663
- Vehicle registration: NF
- Website: www.amt-suedtondern.de

Lexgaard (Danish: Læksgaarde, North Frisian: Leeksguurd) is a municipality in the district of Nordfriesland, in Schleswig-Holstein, Germany.
