= Bökingharde North Frisian =

East-central dialect of North Frisian

Bökingharde Frisian
- Böökinghiirder frasch
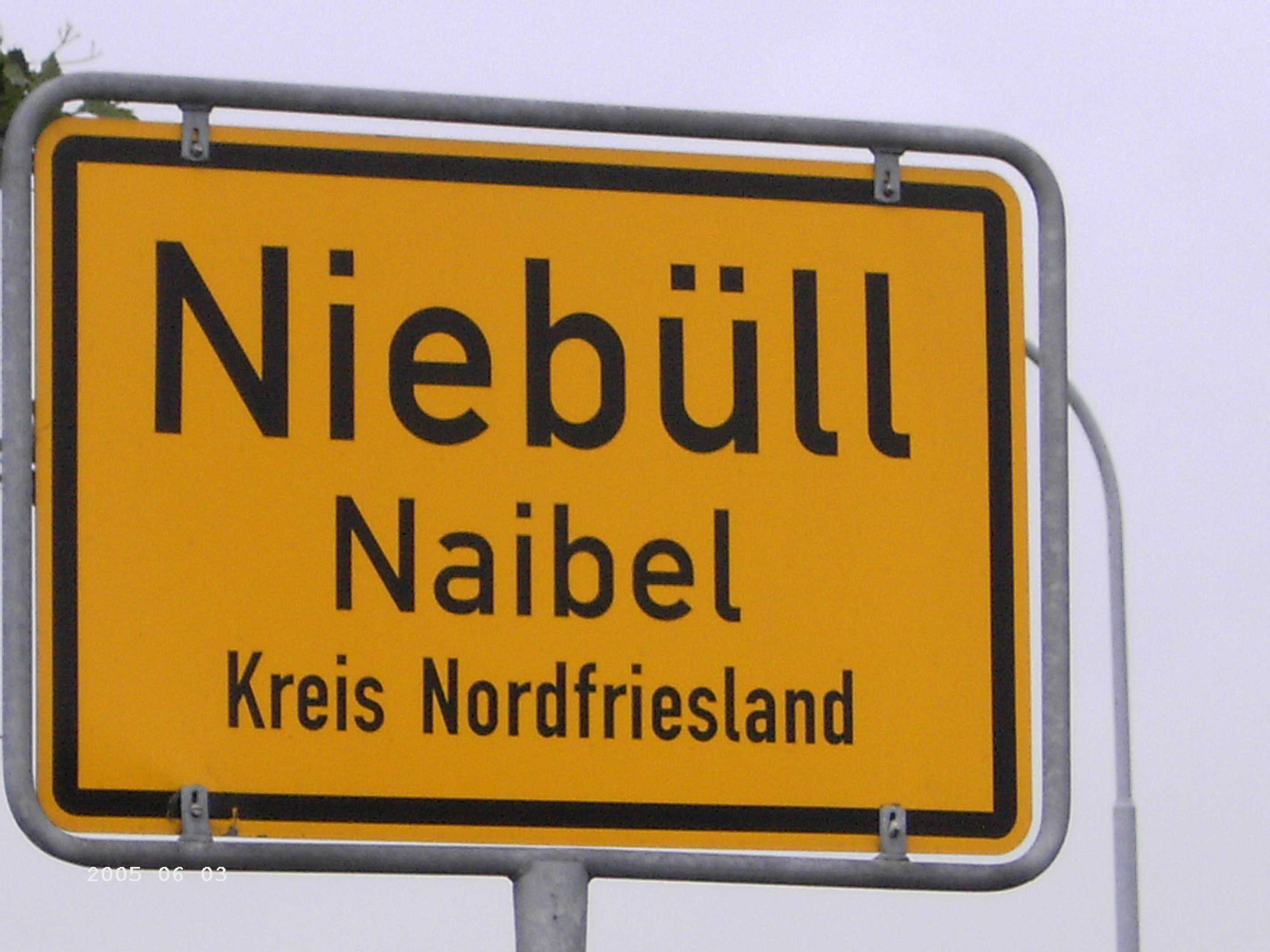
- Bilingual town sign (German-Mooring) in Niebüll
- Native to: Germany
- Region: Bökingharde, Nordfriesland
- Language family: Indo-European: Germanic; West Germanic; Ingvaeonic; Anglo-Frisian; Frisian; North Frisian; Mainland; Bökingharde Frisian
- Dialects: East Mooring; West Mooring

Language codes
- ISO 639-3: –
- Glottolog: moor1245
- Linguasphere: 52-ACA-eab
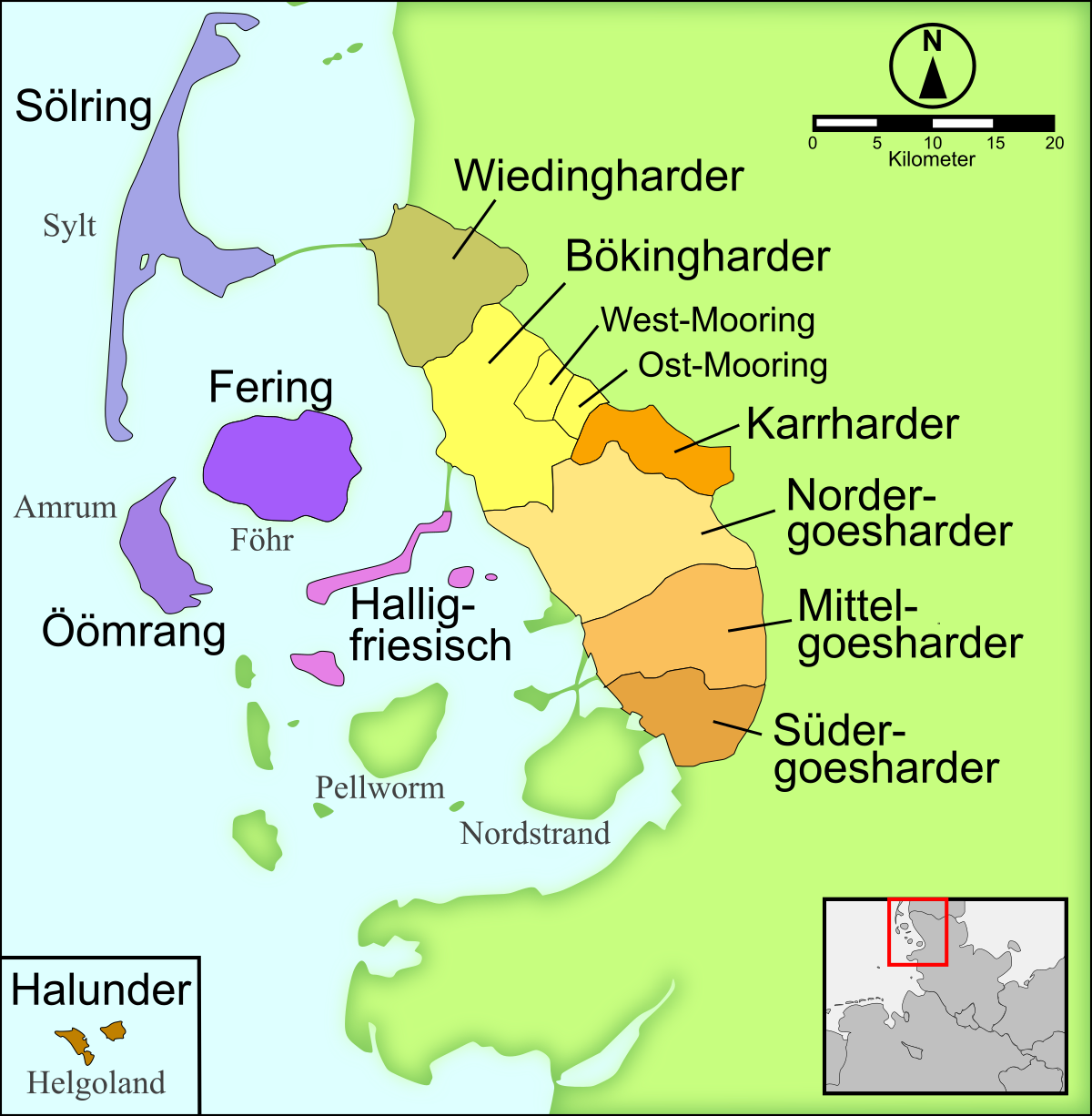
- North Frisian dialects

Bökingharde Frisian (Böökinghiirder frasch), also known as Mooring or Moring, is a dialect of the North Frisian language spoken in Niebüll and the amt of Bökingharde in the German region of North Frisia. The dialect forms part of the mainland group of North Frisian dialects.

The Mooring subdialects are spoken in the Risum Bog (Risem Moor or Risem Måår). Mooring is often used as a North Frisian lingua franca, especially on the internet, and there is a Mooring Frisian primary school in Risum-Lindholm.

== Orthography ==
=== Vowels ===
Capital letters and digraphs
A	Aa	Ai	Au	Ä	Ää	Äi	Å	Åå	E	Ee	I	Ii	O	Oo	Ou	Ö	Öö	Öi	U	Uu	Ü	Üü
Lowercase letters and digraphs
a	aa	ai	au	ä	ää	äi	å	åå	e	ee	i	ii	o	oo	ou	ö	öö	öi	u	uu	ü	üü
IPA value
a	aː	ai	au	ɛ	ɛː	ɛi	ʌ	ʌː	ɛ, ə (Note: unstressed pronunciation)	eː	i, ɪ	iː	ɔ	ɔː	ɔu	œ	œː	œi	ʊ	uː	ʏ	yː

=== Consonants ===
Capital letters and digraphs
B	Ch	D	Dj	F	G	H	J	K	L	Lj	M	N	Ng	Nj	P	R	S	Sch	T	Tj	W
Lowercase letters and digraphs
b	ch	d	dj	f	g	h	j	k	l	lj	m	n	ng	nj	p	r	s	sch	t	tj	w
IPA value
b	x	d	dj, ɟ	f	ɡ, w, j (Note: /ɡ/ is [w], [j] or deleted intervocalically)	h	j	k	l	lj, ʎ	m	n	ŋ	nj, ɲ	p	ʀ	s, z (Note: /s/ in initial position)	ʃ	t	tj, c	v
