= Risum-Lindholm =

- Municipality
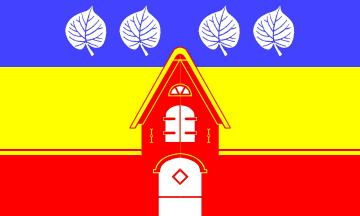
- Flag Coat of arms

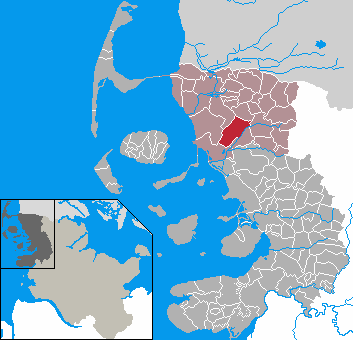
- Location of Risum-Lindholm within Nordfriesland district
- Interactive map of Risum-Lindholm
- Location within Germany Location within Schleswig-Holstein
- Coordinates: 54°46′N 8°52′E
- Country: Germany
- State: Schleswig-Holstein
- District: Nordfriesland
- Municipal assoc.: Südtondern

Government
  - Mayor: Hans Bruhn (FW)

Area
  - Total: 36.03 km^{2} (13.91 sq mi)
- Elevation: 2 m (6.6 ft)

Population (2025-12-31)
  - Total: 3,895
  - Density: 108.1/km^{2} (280.0/sq mi)
- Time zone: UTC+01:00 (CET)
  - Summer (DST): UTC+02:00 (CEST)
- Postal codes: 25920
- Dialling codes: 04661
- Vehicle registration: NF
- Website: risum-lindholm.info

Risum-Lindholm (North Frisian: Risem-Lunham) is a municipality in the district of Nordfriesland, in Schleswig-Holstein, Germany.

== Geography ==
=== Location ===
Risum-Lindholm lies about five kilometres southeast of Niebüll and six kilometres west of Leck on a boundary between a low, sandy area of geest and the marshes.

=== Villages ===
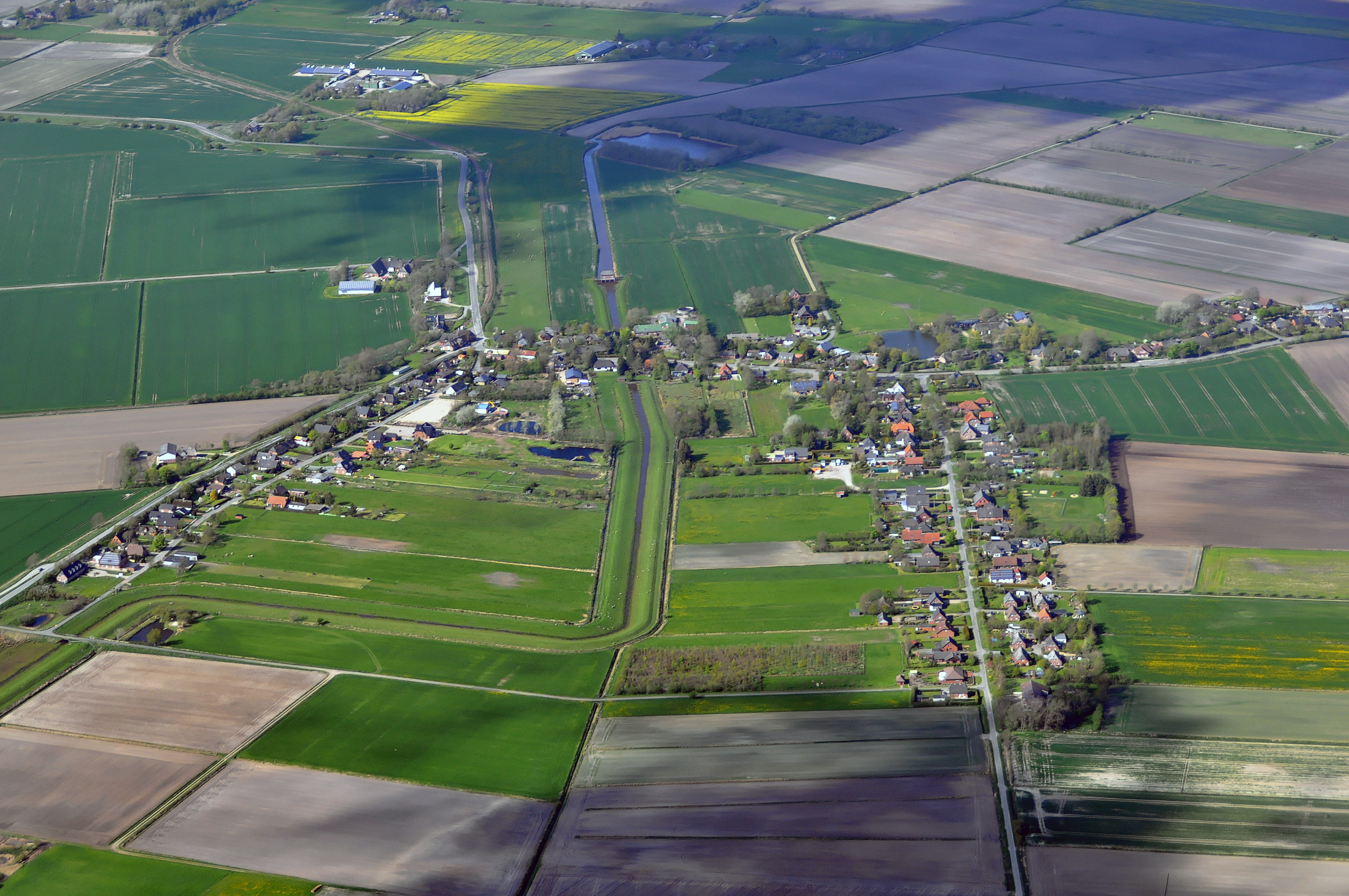
The hamlet of Maasbüll from the air

The municipality was formed in 1969 from the formerly independent municipalities of Risum and Lindholm. Because it extends over several kilometres, the villages of Maasbüll (North Frisian: Moosbel, Danish: Masbøl), Risum (NF: Risem), Lindholm (NF: Lunham), Klockries (NF: Klookris, Dan: Klokris), Wegacker (NF: Wäieeker) and Kremperhaus (Dan. Krempehus) (beside Broweg (NF: Bruwäi), Läiged, Legerade (NF: Läigeroos) and Herrenkoog (NF: Hiirnekuch, Dan: Herrekog), which do not lie on the long village street) are of great importance for describing a location. In local usage, the actual municipal name is rarely used, but rather the name of the respective village.

== Notable people ==
- Momme Andresen (1857-1951), born in Risum, industrial chemist who made practical developments in photography, including the invention of Rodinal
