= Tinningstedt =

- Municipality
- Coat of arms

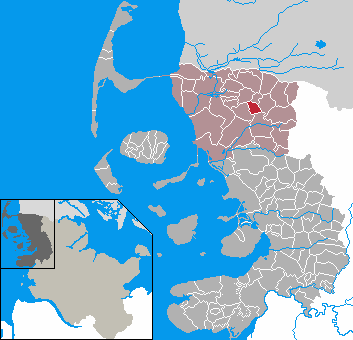
- Location of Tinningstedt within Nordfriesland district
- Interactive map of Tinningstedt
- Location within Germany Location within Schleswig-Holstein
- Coordinates: 54°49′N 8°55′E
- Country: Germany
- State: Schleswig-Holstein
- District: Nordfriesland
- Municipal assoc.: Südtondern

Government
  - Mayor: Dirk Enewaldsen

Area
  - Total: 8.91 km^{2} (3.44 sq mi)
- Elevation: 10 m (33 ft)

Population (2025-12-31)
  - Total: 229
  - Density: 25.7/km^{2} (66.6/sq mi)
- Time zone: UTC+01:00 (CET)
  - Summer (DST): UTC+02:00 (CEST)
- Postal codes: 25917
- Dialling codes: 04662
- Vehicle registration: NF
- Website: www.tinningstedt.de

Tinningstedt (Danish: Tinningsted, North Frisian: Taningstää) is a municipality in the district of Nordfriesland, in Schleswig-Holstein, Germany. Most of the area is divided up into oddly shaped divisions of land. The area is primarily rural, with open country.
