= Ellhöft =

Ellhöft Ellehoved
- Municipality
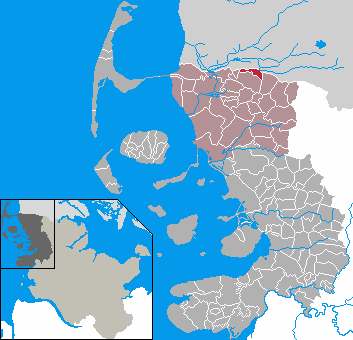
- Location of Ellhöft; Ellehoved within Nordfriesland district
- Interactive map of Ellhöft; Ellehoved
- Location within Germany Location within Schleswig-Holstein
- Coordinates: 54°52′N 8°56′E
- Country: Germany
- State: Schleswig-Holstein
- District: Nordfriesland
- Municipal assoc.: Südtondern

Government
  - Mayor: Jörg Thomsen

Area
  - Total: 7.82 km^{2} (3.02 sq mi)
- Elevation: 6 m (20 ft)

Population (2025-12-31)
  - Total: 104
  - Density: 13.3/km^{2} (34.4/sq mi)
- Time zone: UTC+01:00 (CET)
  - Summer (DST): UTC+02:00 (CEST)
- Postal codes: 25923
- Dialling codes: 04663
- Vehicle registration: NF
- Website: www.amt-suedtondern.de

Ellhöft (Danish: Ellehoved) is a municipality in the district of Nordfriesland, in Schleswig-Holstein, Germany.
