= Friedrich-Wilhelm-Lübke-Koog =

- Municipality
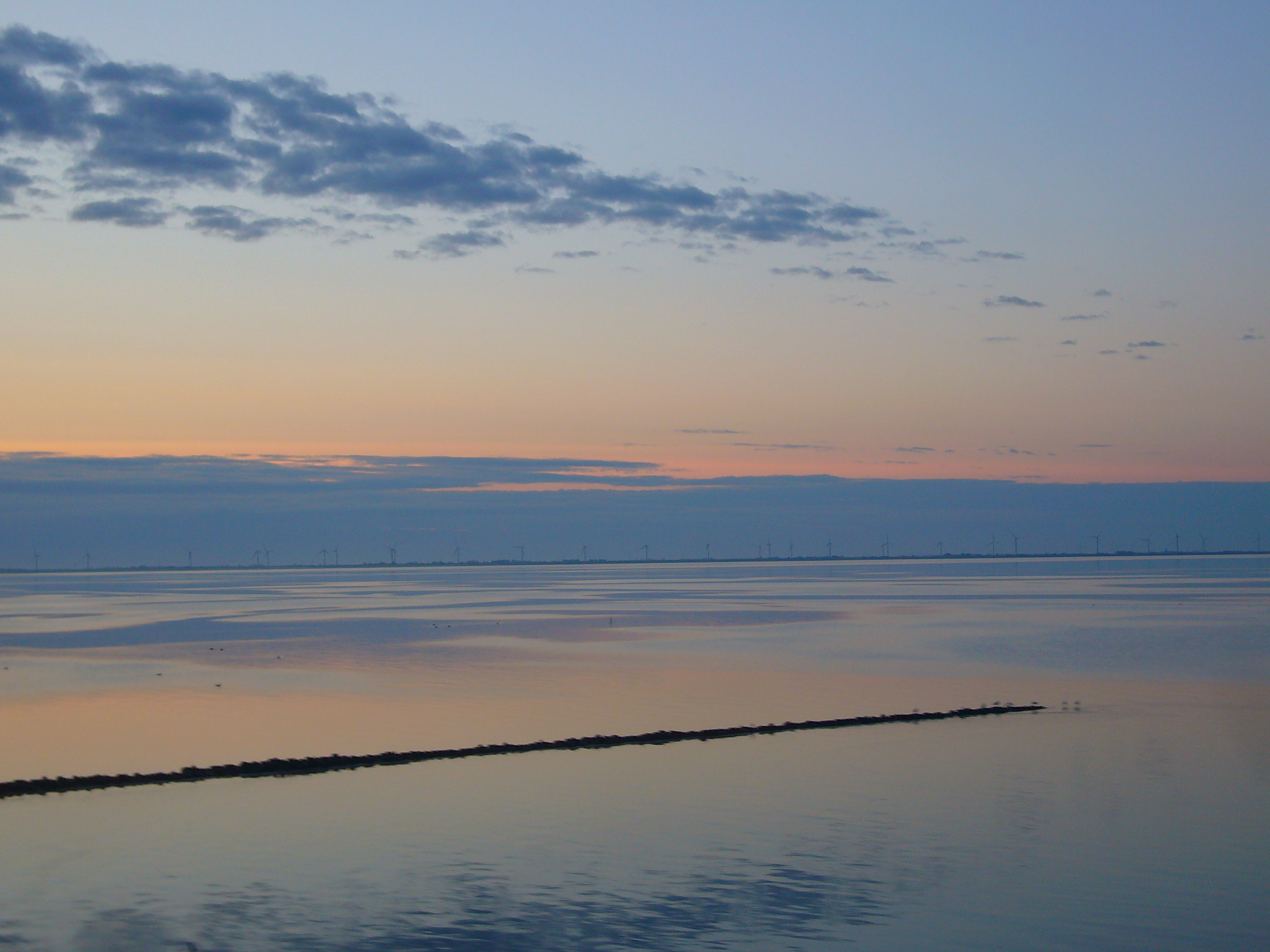
- The coastline of Friedrich-Wilhelm-Lübke-Koog as seen from the Hindenburgdamm causeway

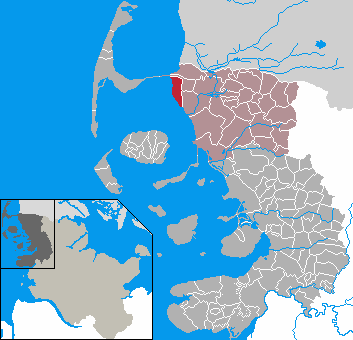
- Location of Friedrich-Wilhelm-Lübke-Koog within Nordfriesland district
- Interactive map of Friedrich-Wilhelm-Lübke-Koog
- Location within Germany Location within Schleswig-Holstein
- Coordinates: 54°52′N 8°38′E
- Country: Germany
- State: Schleswig-Holstein
- District: Nordfriesland
- Municipal assoc.: Südtondern

Government
  - Mayor: Carl-August thor Straten

Area
  - Total: 13.49 km^{2} (5.21 sq mi)
- Elevation: 1 m (3.3 ft)

Population (2025-12-31)
  - Total: 162
  - Density: 12.0/km^{2} (31.1/sq mi)
- Time zone: UTC+01:00 (CET)
  - Summer (DST): UTC+02:00 (CEST)
- Postal codes: 25924
- Dialling codes: 04668
- Vehicle registration: NF
- Website: www.amt-suedtondern.de

Friedrich-Wilhelm-Lübke-Koog is a municipality in the district of Nordfriesland, in Schleswig-Holstein, Germany.

The municipality is located in and named after the polder (German: Koog), which was finished in 1954 and named in honour of Schleswig-Holstein's Minister-President Friedrich-Wilhelm Lübke (in German), who had died the same year.
