= Stedesand =

Stedesand Stääsönj
- Municipality
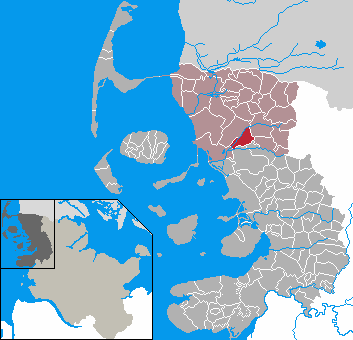
- Location of Stedesand; Stääsönj within Nordfriesland district
- Interactive map of Stedesand; Stääsönj
- Location within Germany Location within Schleswig-Holstein
- Coordinates: 54°43′N 8°55′E
- Country: Germany
- State: Schleswig-Holstein
- District: Nordfriesland
- Municipal assoc.: Südtondern

Government
  - Mayor: Christian Steensen

Area
  - Total: 15.19 km^{2} (5.86 sq mi)
- Elevation: 3 m (9.8 ft)

Population (2025-12-31)
  - Total: 870
  - Density: 57/km^{2} (150/sq mi)
- Time zone: UTC+01:00 (CET)
  - Summer (DST): UTC+02:00 (CEST)
- Postal codes: 25920
- Dialling codes: 04662
- Vehicle registration: NF
- Website: www.amt-suedtondern.de

Stedesand (North Frisian: Stääsönj) is a municipality in the district of Nordfriesland, in Schleswig-Holstein, Germany.
