= Rodenäs =

Rodenäs Rødenæs / Runees
- Municipality
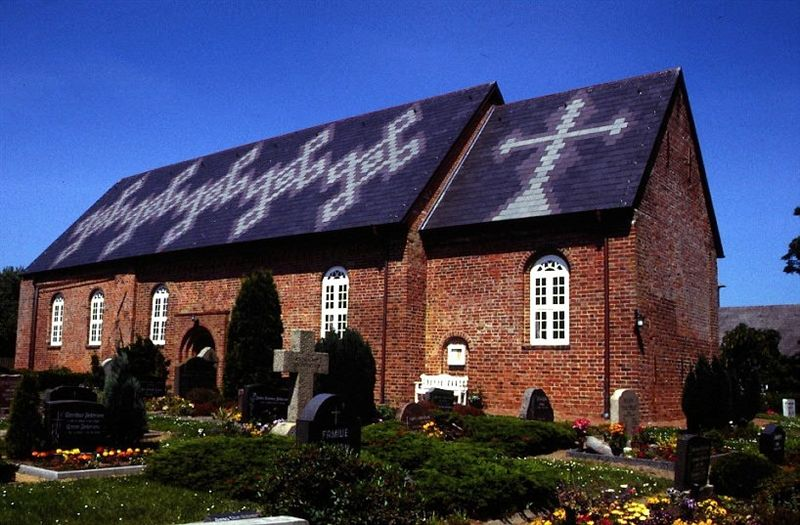
- The church in Rodenäs

- Coat of arms

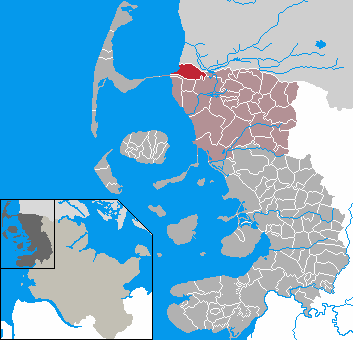
- Location of Rodenäs within Nordfriesland district
- Interactive map of Rodenäs
- Location within Germany Location within Schleswig-Holstein
- Coordinates: 54°52′N 8°41′E
- Country: Germany
- State: Schleswig-Holstein
- District: Nordfriesland
- Municipal assoc.: Südtondern

Government
  - Mayor: Thomas Dose

Area
  - Total: 19.84 km^{2} (7.66 sq mi)
- Elevation: 2 m (6.6 ft)

Population (2025-12-31)
  - Total: 397
  - Density: 20.0/km^{2} (51.8/sq mi)
- Time zone: UTC+01:00 (CET)
  - Summer (DST): UTC+02:00 (CEST)
- Postal codes: 25924
- Dialling codes: 04668
- Vehicle registration: NF
- Website: www.amt-suedtondern.de

Rodenäs (Danish: Rødenæs, North Frisian Runees or Rornees) is a municipality in the district of Nordfriesland, in Schleswig-Holstein, Germany.

The northernmost point of mainland Germany is located in the municipality.
