= Karlum =

- Municipality
- Coat of arms

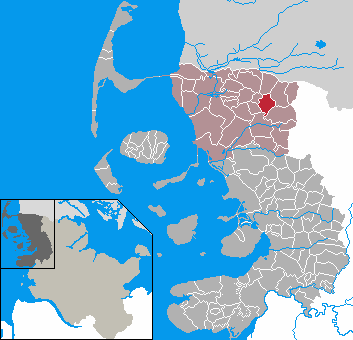
- Location of Karlum within Nordfriesland district
- Interactive map of Karlum
- Location within Germany Location within Schleswig-Holstein
- Coordinates: 54°50′N 8°58′E
- Country: Germany
- State: Schleswig-Holstein
- District: Nordfriesland
- Municipal assoc.: Südtondern

Government
  - Mayor: Peter Möller

Area
  - Total: 14.46 km^{2} (5.58 sq mi)
- Elevation: 13 m (43 ft)

Population (2025-12-31)
  - Total: 197
  - Density: 13.6/km^{2} (35.3/sq mi)
- Time zone: UTC+01:00 (CET)
  - Summer (DST): UTC+02:00 (CEST)
- Postal codes: 25926
- Dialling codes: 04666
- Vehicle registration: NF
- Website: www.amt-suedtondern.de

Karlum is a municipality in the district of Nordfriesland, in Schleswig-Holstein, Germany.
