= Braderup =

- Municipality
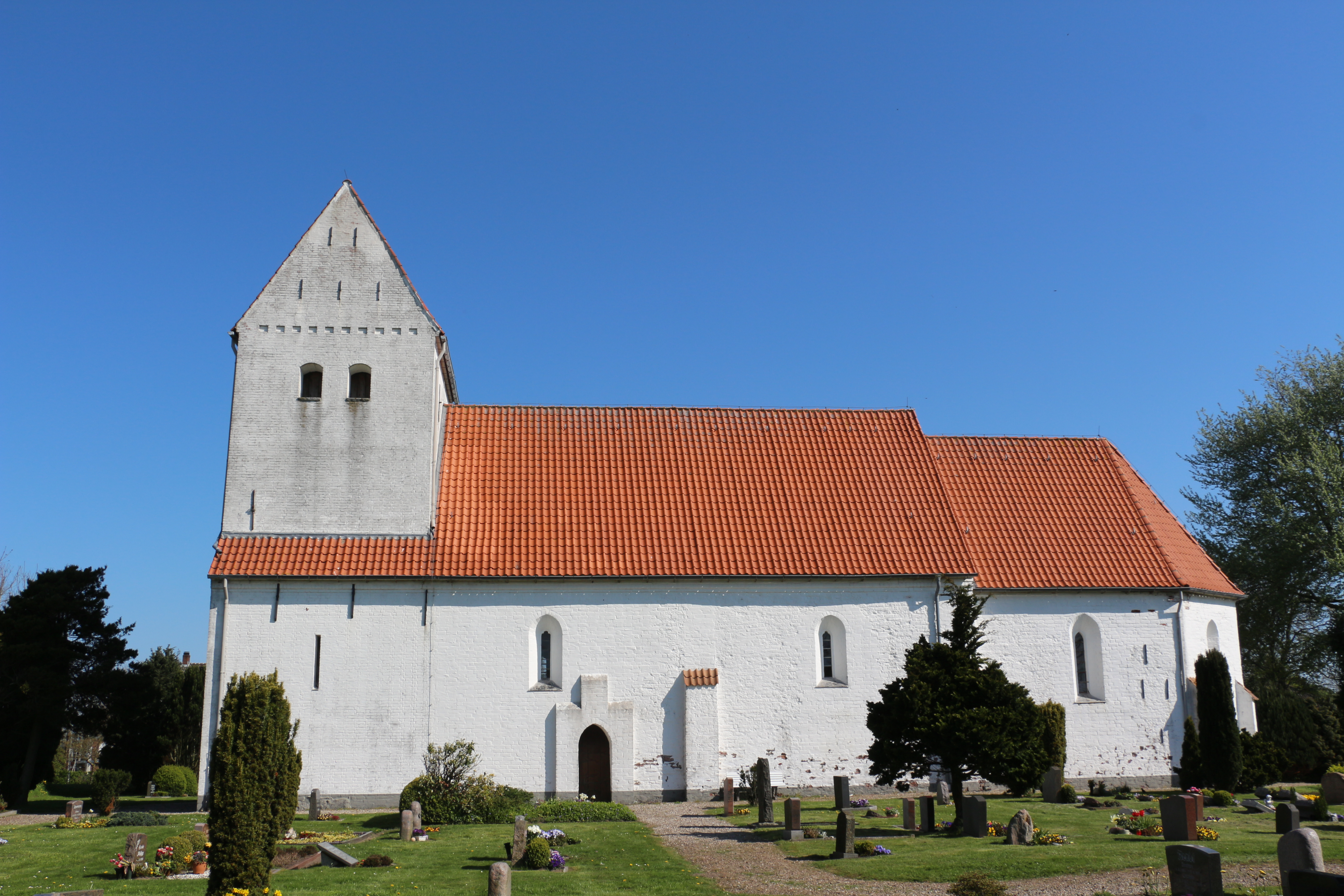
- The church of Braderup

- Coat of arms

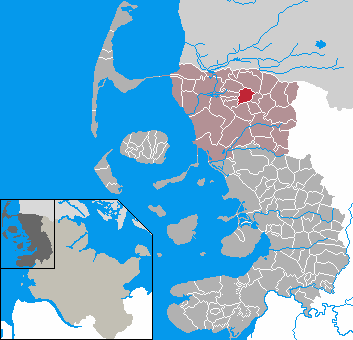
- Location of Braderup within Nordfriesland district
- Interactive map of Braderup
- Location within Germany Location within Schleswig-Holstein
- Coordinates: 54°50′N 8°54′E
- Country: Germany
- State: Schleswig-Holstein
- District: Nordfriesland
- Municipal assoc.: Südtondern

Government
  - Mayor: Peter Otto Petersen

Area
  - Total: 13.35 km^{2} (5.15 sq mi)
- Elevation: 4 m (13 ft)

Population (2025-12-31)
  - Total: 688
  - Density: 51.5/km^{2} (133/sq mi)
- Time zone: UTC+01:00 (CET)
  - Summer (DST): UTC+02:00 (CEST)
- Postal codes: 25923
- Dialling codes: 04663
- Vehicle registration: NF
- Website: www.amt-suedtondern.de

Braderup is a municipality in the district of Nordfriesland, in Schleswig-Holstein, Germany.
