= Leck, Nordfriesland =

Leck
- Municipality
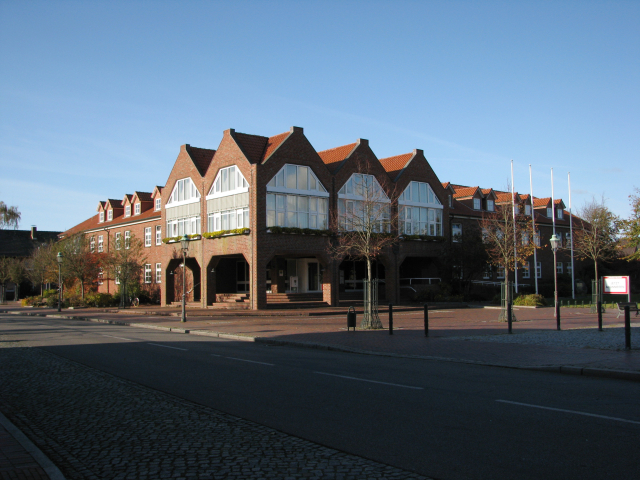
- The former town hall of Leck

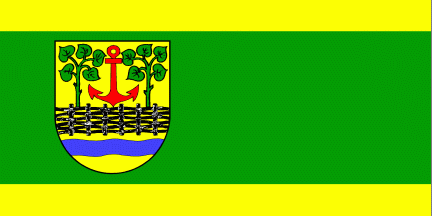
- Flag Coat of arms

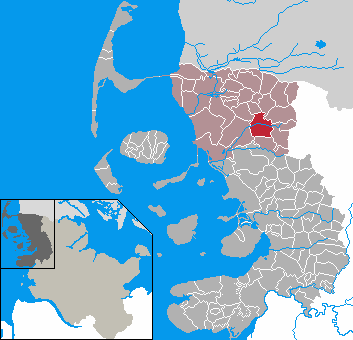
- Location of Leck within Nordfriesland district
- Interactive map of Leck
- Location within Germany Location within Schleswig-Holstein
- Coordinates: 54°46′28″N 8°58′25″E
- Country: Germany
- State: Schleswig-Holstein
- District: Nordfriesland
- Municipal assoc.: Südtondern

Government
  - Mayor: Andreas Deidert

Area
  - Total: 29.79 km^{2} (11.50 sq mi)
- Elevation: 6 m (20 ft)

Population (2025-12-31)
  - Total: 7,918
  - Density: 265.8/km^{2} (688.4/sq mi)
- Time zone: UTC+01:00 (CET)
  - Summer (DST): UTC+02:00 (CEST)
- Postal codes: 25917
- Dialling codes: 04662
- Vehicle registration: NF
- Website: www.leck.de

Leck (Danish: Læk; Mooring North Frisian: Leek) is a municipality in the district of Nordfriesland, in Schleswig-Holstein, Germany. It is situated approximately 30 km north of Husum, and 30 km west of Flensburg.

It is also home to the former Leck Air Base.

== Climate ==
Climate data for Leck (1991–2020 normals)
Month	Jan	Feb	Mar	Apr	May	Jun	Jul	Aug	Sep	Oct	Nov	Dec	Year
Mean daily maximum °C (°F)	4.1 (39.4)	4.5 (40.1)	7.3 (45.1)	12.5 (54.5)	16.3 (61.3)	19.0 (66.2)	21.5 (70.7)	21.4 (70.5)	17.8 (64.0)	13.0 (55.4)	8.0 (46.4)	5.0 (41.0)	12.5 (54.5)
Daily mean °C (°F)	1.9 (35.4)	1.9 (35.4)	3.9 (39.0)	7.7 (45.9)	11.6 (52.9)	14.7 (58.5)	17.0 (62.6)	16.8 (62.2)	13.7 (56.7)	9.7 (49.5)	5.6 (42.1)	2.9 (37.2)	8.9 (48.0)
Mean daily minimum °C (°F)	−0.5 (31.1)	−0.6 (30.9)	0.5 (32.9)	3.1 (37.6)	6.5 (43.7)	9.8 (49.6)	12.0 (53.6)	11.9 (53.4)	9.5 (49.1)	6.3 (43.3)	2.8 (37.0)	0.3 (32.5)	5.1 (41.2)
Average precipitation mm (inches)	70.0 (2.76)	50.6 (1.99)	48.7 (1.92)	35.1 (1.38)	48.9 (1.93)	72.5 (2.85)	80.1 (3.15)	92.2 (3.63)	89.4 (3.52)	91.5 (3.60)	77.5 (3.05)	81.8 (3.22)	852.7 (33.57)
Average precipitation days (≥ 1.0 mm)	20.0	17.0	16.2	12.8	13.1	14.9	15.4	17.8	17.1	18.9	19.4	20.6	200.7
Average relative humidity (%)	90.9	88.5	84.7	77.7	76.0	77.3	78.1	80.0	83.7	86.8	90.3	91.6	83.8
Mean monthly sunshine hours	45.1	63.3	120.7	187.8	232.8	219.1	222.0	199.6	143.9	94.8	51.0	37.8	1,611.3
Source: World Meteorological Organization
