= Niebüll =

Niebüll Naibel (North Frisian) Nibøl (Danish)
- Town
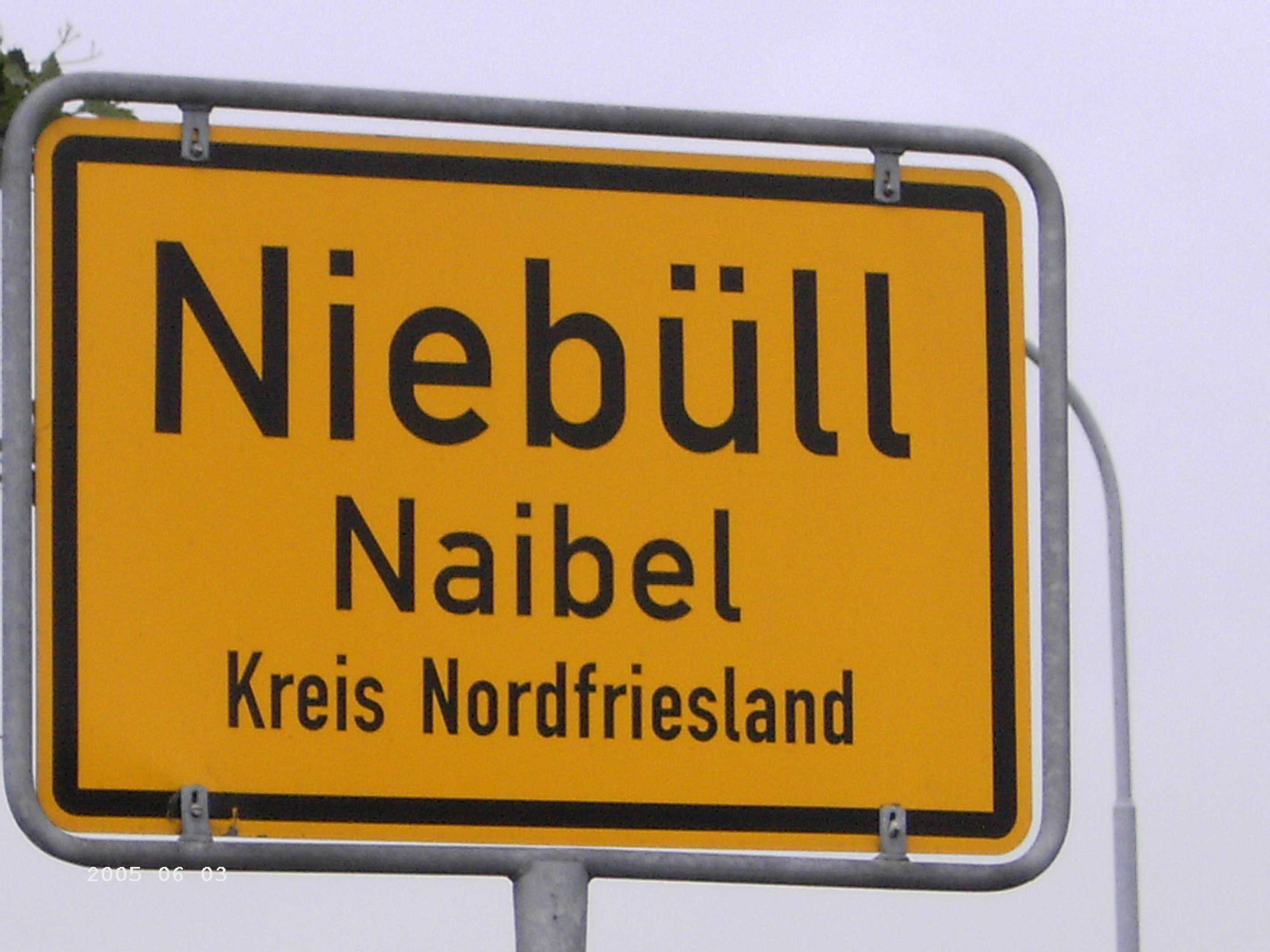

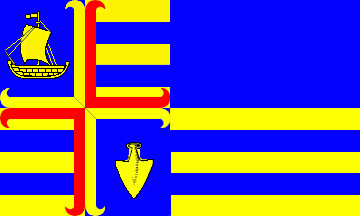
- Flag Coat of arms

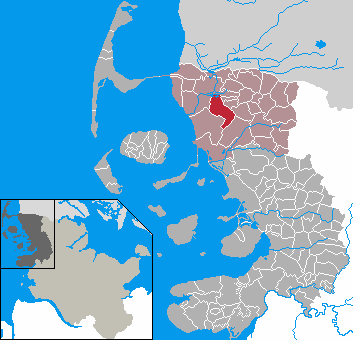
- Location of Niebüll within Nordfriesland district
- Interactive map of Niebüll
- Location within Germany Location within Schleswig-Holstein
- Coordinates: 54°47′17.16″N 8°49′46.56″E
- Country: Germany
- State: Schleswig-Holstein
- District: Nordfriesland
- Municipal assoc.: Südtondern

Government
  - Mayor: Wilfried Bockholt

Area
  - Total: 30.63 km^{2} (11.83 sq mi)
- Elevation: 3 m (9.8 ft)

Population (2025-12-31)
  - Total: 10,122
  - Density: 330.5/km^{2} (855.9/sq mi)
- Time zone: UTC+01:00 (CET)
  - Summer (DST): UTC+02:00 (CEST)
- Postal codes: 25899
- Dialling codes: 04661
- Vehicle registration: NF
- Website: www.niebuell.de

Niebüll (German: [ˈniːbʏl]; Mooring North Frisian: Naibel; Danish: Nibøl) is a town in the district of Nordfriesland, in Schleswig-Holstein, Germany. It is situated near the North Sea coast and the border with Denmark, approx. 35 km (20 miles) northwest of Husum.

Local districts and settlements include Deezbüll, Deezbüll-Burg, Langstoft, Uhlebüll, Gath and Tegelwang

== International relations ==
Niebüll is twinned with:

- Malmesbury, England
- Płoty, Poland

== Education ==
- Professional School in the District of North Frisia in Niebull
- FPS (Friedrich-Paulsen-Schule) Niebüll
- Stiftung Uhlebüll: Pflegeschule Uhlebüll
- VHS (Volkshochschule) Niebüll e.V.

== Health ==
- Klinikum Nordfriesland Clinic Niebüll
- DIAKO Medizinisches Versorgungszentrum GmbH
- Nephrologische Praxis und Dialyse-Zentrum Nordfriesland

== Notable people ==
- Momme Andresen (1857–1951), born in Risum, educated in Niebüll, industrial chemist who made practical developments in photography including the invention of Rodinal
- Carl Ludwig Jessen (1833–1917), painter of North Frisian daily life.
- Carsta Löck (1902–1993), actress
- Max Hansen (1908–1990), Waffen SS Standartenführer
- Bernd Raffelhüschen (born 1957), economist
- Nikolai See Hansen (ca. 1600-1634), local fishermen, died saving townsfolk during Burchardi flood and eversince center of local urban myth, stating he sold his fish to the people he saved on his ship. Often referred to as "Nagge der Schnacker"
