= Treene (Amt) =

Coordinates: 54°27′45″N 9°05′45″E

- Former amt
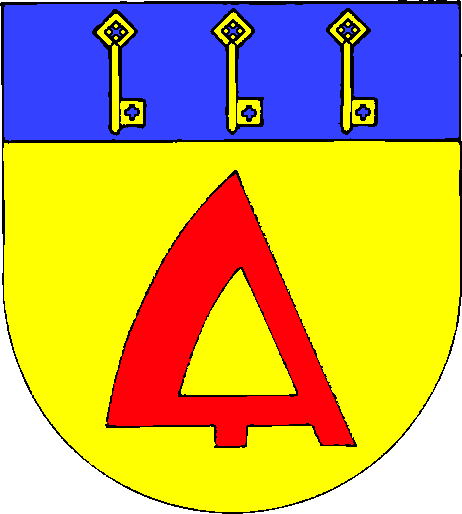
- Coat of arms

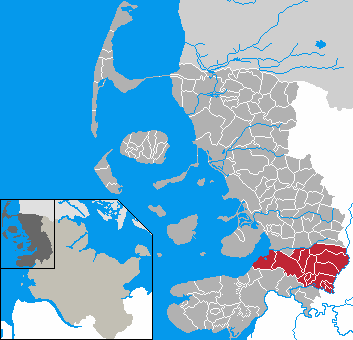
- Map of Dithmarschen highlighting Treene
- Country: Germany
- State: Schleswig-Holstein
- District: Nordfriesland
- Disestablished: 1 January 2008
- Region seat: Mildstedt

Area
  - Total: 184 km^{2} (71 sq mi)

Treene was an Amt ("collective municipality") in the district of Nordfriesland, in Schleswig-Holstein, Germany. It was situated between Husum and the Eider River. Its seat was in Mildstedt. In January 2008, it was merged with the Ämter Friedrichstadt, Nordstrand and Hattstedt to form the Amt Nordsee-Treene.

The Amt Treene consisted of the following municipalities:

1. Fresendelf
2. Hude
3. Mildstedt
4. Oldersbek
5. Ostenfeld
6. Ramstedt
7. Rantrum
8. Schwabstedt
9. Simonsberg
10. Süderhöft
11. Südermarsch
12. Winnert
13. Wisch
14. Wittbek
