= Hattstedt (Amt) =

Coordinates: 54.528°N 9.024°E

- Former amt
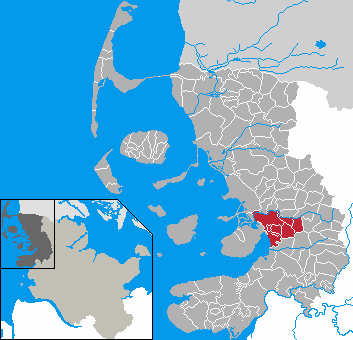
- Map of Dithmarschen highlighting Hattstedt
- Country: Germany
- State: Schleswig-Holstein
- District: Nordfriesland
- Disestablished: 1 January 2008
- Region seat: Hattstedt

Area
  - Total: 80 km^{2} (31 sq mi)

Hattstedt was an Amt ("collective municipality") in the district of Nordfriesland, in Schleswig-Holstein, Germany. Its seat was in Hattstedt. In January 2008, it was merged with the Ämter Friedrichstadt, Nordstrand and Treene to form the Amt Nordsee-Treene.

The Amt Hattstedt consisted of the following municipalities:

1. Arlewatt
2. Hattstedt
3. Hattstedtermarsch
4. Horstedt
5. Olderup
6. Wobbenbüll
