= Friedrichstadt (Amt) =

Coordinates: 54.376°N 9.089°E

Nusse
- Former Amt
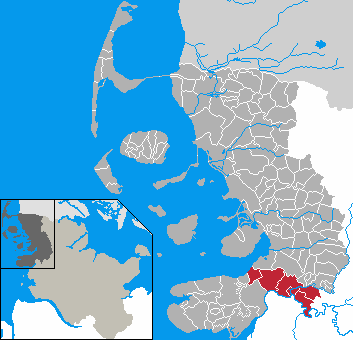
- Map of Dithmarschen highlighting Friedrichstadt
- Country: Germany
- State: Schleswig-Holstein
- District: Nordfriesland
- Disestablished: 1 January 2008
- Region seat: Friedrichstadt

Area
  - Total: 100 km^{2} (39 sq mi)

Friedrichstadt was an Amt ("collective municipality") in the district of Nordfriesland, in Schleswig-Holstein, Germany. Its seat was in Friedrichstadt. In January 2008, it (with the exception of the town Friedrichstadt) was merged with the Ämter Hattstedt, Nordstrand and Treene to form the Amt Nordsee-Treene.

The Amt Friedrichstadt consisted of the following municipalities:

1. Drage
2. Friedrichstadt
3. Koldenbüttel
4. Seeth
5. Uelvesbüll
6. Witzwort
