= Nordstrand (Amt) =

Coordinates: 54.483°N 8.883°E

Hattstedt
- Former amt
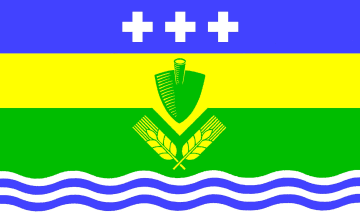
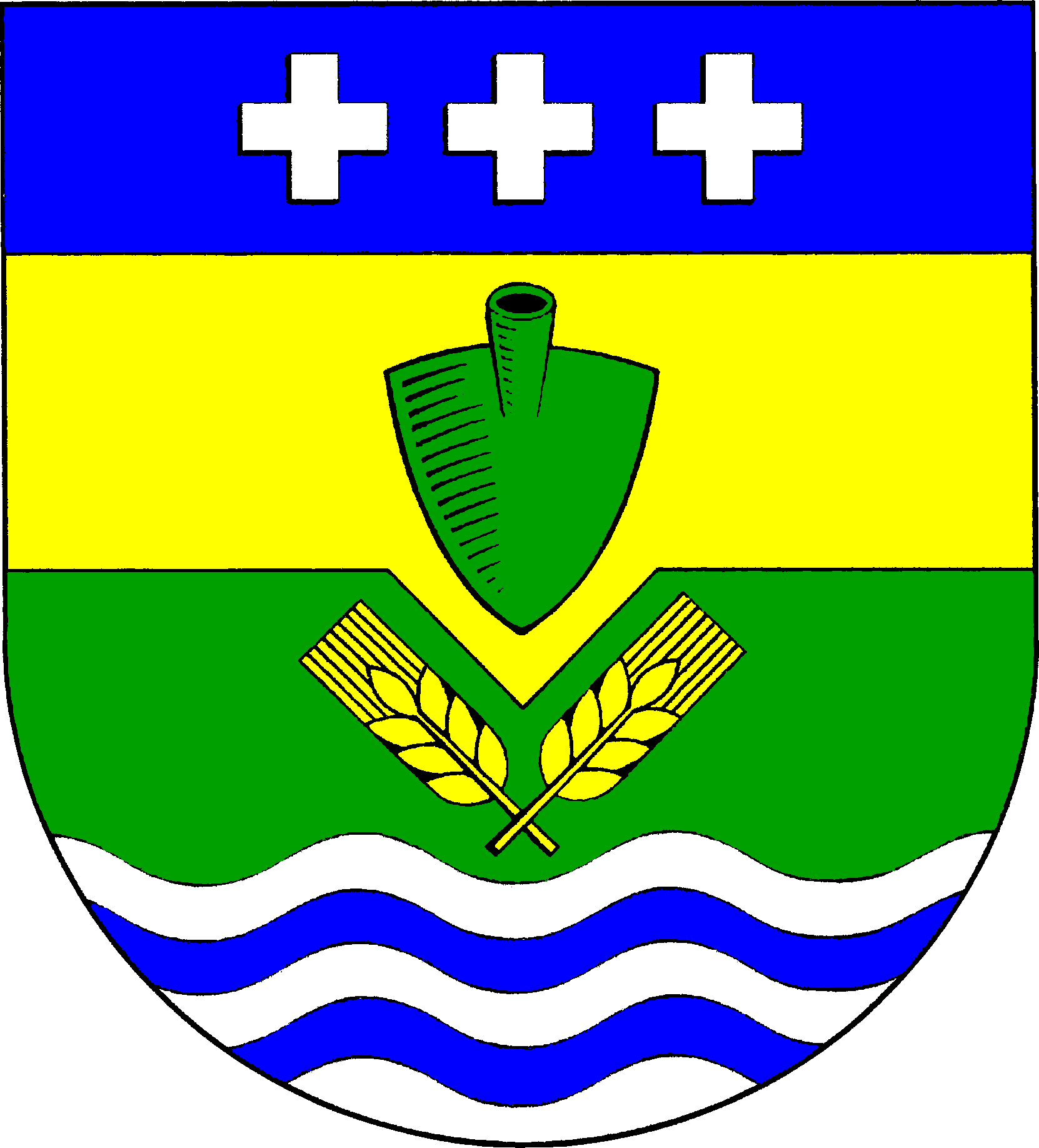
- Flag Coat of arms

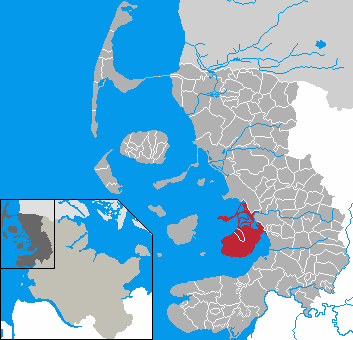
- Map of Dithmarschen highlighting Nordstrand
- Country: Germany
- State: Schleswig-Holstein
- District: Nordfriesland
- Disestablished: 1 January 2008
- Region seat: Nordstrand

Area
  - Total: 63 km^{2} (24 sq mi)

Nordstrand was an Amt ("collective municipality") in the district of Nordfriesland, in Schleswig-Holstein, Germany. Its seat was in Nordstrand. In January 2008, it was merged with the Ämter Friedrichstadt, Hattstedt and Treene to form the Amt Nordsee-Treene.

The Amt Nordstrand consisted of the following municipalities:

1. Elisabeth-Sophien-Koog
2. Nordstrand
