= Friedrichstadt (disambiguation) =

Friedrichstadt may refer to:

- Friedrichstadt, a town in Schleswig-Holstein
- Friedrichstadt (Amt), a collective municipality in Schleswig-Holstein
- Friedrichstadt (Berlin), a neighbourhood of Berlin
- Friedrichstadt (Dresden), a quarter of Dresden
- Düsseldorf-Friedrichstadt, a quarter of Düsseldorf
- Former name of the city of Jaunjelgava, Latvia
- Friedrichstadt, a former name (before 1918) for the district around Paechtown, South Australia
