= Horstead (surname) =

Horstead is a surname. Notable people with the surname include:

- James Horstead (1898–1989), Anglican bishop of Sierra Leone
- Jill Horstead (born 1967), Canadian swimmer

== See also ==
- Horsted (disambiguation)
