= Mikkelberg-Kunst-und-Cricket Center =

Cricket ground in Hattstedt, Germany

Coordinates: 54°31′32.10″N 09°02′11.21″E

- Interactive map of Mikkelberg-Kunst-und-Cricket Center

Ground information
- Location: Hattstedt, Germany
- Country: Denmark
- Establishment: 1991 (first recorded match)

International information
- First women's ODI: 5 July 1997: Denmark v Netherlands
- Last women's ODI: 26 July 1998: Denmark v Netherlands
- As of 3 September 2020; Source: Ground profile

Mikkelberg-Kunst-und-Cricket Center is a cricket ground in Hattstedt, Germany. The first recorded match on the ground was held in 1991 when the Denmark women's national team played the Netherlands in a fixture. The ground later served as a venue for the two teams in four One Day International matches, two in 1997 and two in 1998. These were the only major international cricket matches held in Germany until 2021. It is the home ground of Husum Cricket Club.
