= Nordsee-Treene =

- Amt
- Logo

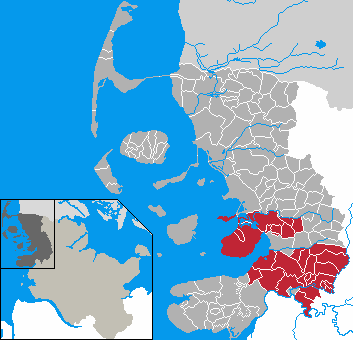
- Map of Nordfriesland highlighting Nordsee-Treene
- Interactive map of Nordsee-Treene
- Location within Germany Location within Schleswig-Holstein
- Coordinates: 54°28′N 9°06′E
- Country: Germany
- State: Schleswig-Holstein
- District: Nordfriesland
- Founded: 2008
- Seat: Mildstedt
- Subdivisions: 27 municipalities

Government
  - Mayor: Eva-Maria Kühl (CDU)

Area
  - Total: 412.14 km^{2} (159.13 sq mi)

Population (2025-12-31)
  - Total: 25,653
  - Density: 62.243/km^{2} (161.21/sq mi)
- Time zone: UTC+01:00 (CET)
  - Summer (DST): UTC+02:00 (CEST)
- Website: amt-nordsee-treene.de

Nordsee-Treene is an Amt ("collective municipality") in the district of Nordfriesland, in Schleswig-Holstein, Germany. Its seat is in Mildstedt. It was formed on 1 January 2008 from the former Ämter Friedrichstadt (except the town Friedrichstadt), Hattstedt, Nordstrand and Treene.

The Amt Nordsee-Treene consists of the following municipalities:

1. Arlewatt
2. Drage
3. Elisabeth-Sophien-Koog
4. Fresendelf
5. Hattstedt
6. Hattstedtermarsch
7. Horstedt
8. Hude
9. Koldenbüttel
10. Mildstedt
11. Nordstrand
12. Oldersbek
13. Olderup
14. Ostenfeld
15. Ramstedt
16. Rantrum
17. Schwabstedt
18. Seeth
19. Simonsberg
20. Süderhöft
21. Südermarsch
22. Uelvesbüll
23. Winnert
24. Wisch
25. Wittbek
26. Witzwort
27. Wobbenbüll
