= Horsted =

Horsted may refer to:

- Little Horsted, a village in East Sussex, England
- Fort Horsted, a scheduled monument in Kent, England
- Horstedt, Schleswig-Holstein, a municipality in Nordfriesland, Schleswig-Holstein, Germany

== People with the surname ==
- Eric Horsted, American television writer
- Jesper Horsted (born 1997), American football player

== See also ==
- Horsted Keynes, a village in West Sussex, England
- Horstead
