= Neukirchen, Nordfriesland =

Neukirchen Neukirchen Nykirke / Naischöspel
- Municipality
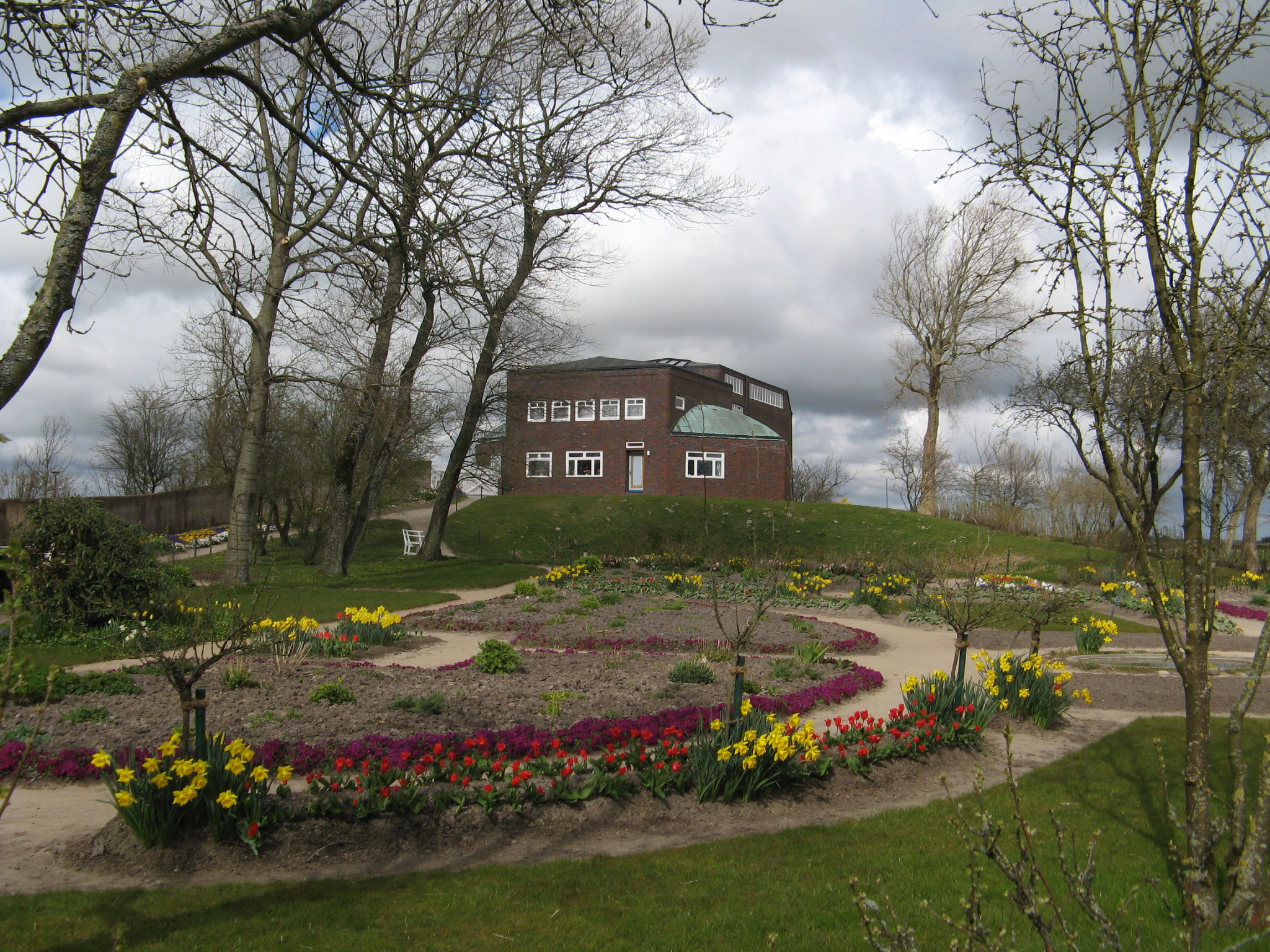
- House Seebüll, home of painter Emil Nolde

- Coat of arms

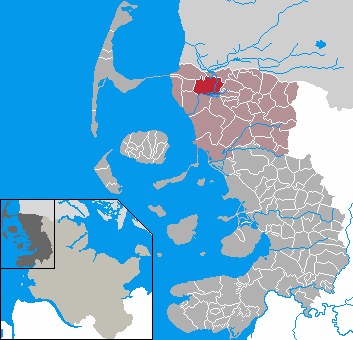
- Location of Neukirchen within Nordfriesland district
- Interactive map of Neukirchen
- Location within Germany Location within Schleswig-Holstein
- Coordinates: 54°52′N 8°43′E
- Country: Germany
- State: Schleswig-Holstein
- District: Nordfriesland
- Municipal assoc.: Südtondern

Government
  - Mayor: Peter Ewaldsen

Area
  - Total: 31.58 km^{2} (12.19 sq mi)
- Elevation: 0 m (0 ft)

Population (2025-12-31)
  - Total: 1,117
  - Density: 35.37/km^{2} (91.61/sq mi)
- Time zone: UTC+01:00 (CET)
  - Summer (DST): UTC+02:00 (CEST)
- Postal codes: 25927
- Dialling codes: 04664
- Vehicle registration: NF
- Website: www.amt-suedtondern.de

Neukirchen (German pronunciation: [nɔʏˈkɪʁçn̩]; Danish: Nykirke; North Frisian: Naischöspel) is a municipality in the district of Nordfriesland, in Schleswig-Holstein, Germany.

== Notable people ==
- In 1927, expressionist painter and printmaker Emil Nolde designed his house Seebüll in Neukirchen, where he lived to his death.
