= Anna Ovena Hoyer =

German Swedish writer and poet (1584–1655)

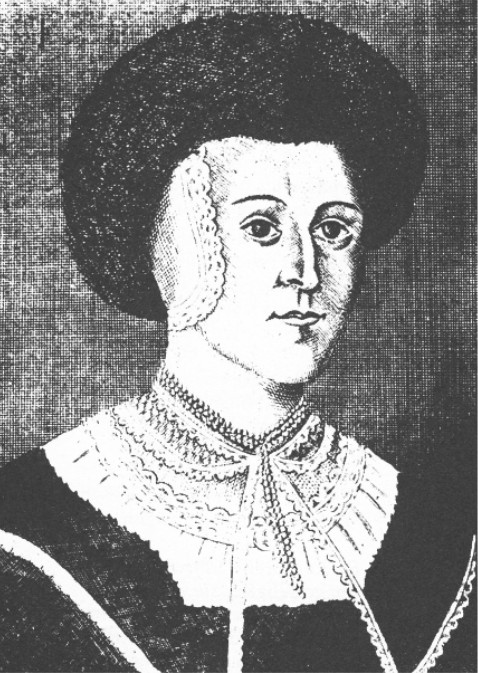
Anna Ovena Hoyer

Anna Ovena Hoyer (born: Anke Hanß, aka Anna Ovena Hoyers, Swedish: Anna Orena Höijer) (Koldenbüttel on Ejdersted peninsula 1584 – 27 November 1655) was a writer and poet, originally German; active in Sweden from 1632. She belonged to the Schwenkfeldians (a branch founded by Nicolaus Knutzen Teting called Brethren in Christ (Brüder in Christo)) and was a critic of Lutheranism.

== Biography ==
Hoyer was the only child of the wealthy astronomer Hans Owens (aka Johann Oven) (1560–1584) and his wife Wennecke Hunnens (1567–1587). After her parents' deaths she lived with her uncle Meves Owens (1555–1630) and was educated in astronomy, literature, music, and the Classics. At 15 she married Hermann Hoyer, stadtholder in Ejdersted, with whom she had at least nine children. With her dowry, amounting to 100,000 rixdollar of Lübeck fineness, she helped to repay debts charged on her spouse's estates. She inherited the manor Hoyersworth (a part of today's Oldenswort) in the North Sea coastal marshes at Hermann Hoyer's death on 13 September 1622.

She was influenced by Indian religion in her reluctance to kill anything living, and became influenced by the sectarians Nicolaus Knutzen Teting and Hartvig Lehmann, religious refugees from Flensborg to whom she gave asylum. She refused to participate in the church services and held her own. She ruined herself on charity. In 1632, she sold her estate to Augusta of Denmark and fled with her five children to Sweden, where she became a protégée of the queen, Maria Eleonora of Brandenburg. In 1634 she visited Hoyersworth and experienced in October the devastating Burchardi flood. In Sweden she resided in Västervik and thereafter at a little property outside Stockholm until her death.

== Works ==
- Poem (anonymous, Slesvig, 1617)
- "Schreiben an die Herrn Titulträger von Hohen Schulen" (1625)
- Gespräch eines Kindes mit seiner Mutter (1628)
- De denische Dörp-Pape (anti-Lutheran publication), Paul Schütze (ed.), in: Zeitschrift der Gesellschaft für schleswig-holstein-lauenburgische Geschichte, vol. 15 (1885), pp. 243–299.
  - originally published in 1630
- Das Buch Ruth, in Teutsche Reimen gestellet. Stockholm (1634) (dedicated to Queen Maria Eleonore)
- Ein Schreiben übers Meer gesandt an die Gemein in Engellandt (1649)
- Annae Ovenae Hoijers Geistliche und Weltliche Poemata. Amsterdam (1650)
- «Geistliche und weltliche Poëmata» (collection) Amsterdam, (1655)
- «Posaunenschall vom Abendmahl im Königs Saal nach Babels Fall»
- «Two seventeenth century Dutch Carols», Editions Ars Femina (1991)

Her Gespräch eines Kindes mit seiner Mutter, written for her children and published in 1628, was reissued in 1698 by Phillipp Jacob Spener without naming the actual author. Another new edition entitled The Way of True Piety in the Following Spiritual Conversation of a Child with His Mother: Presented by a Christian Matron appeared in 1720. Her Annae Ovenae Hoijers Geistliche und Weltliche Poemata (Spiritual and Secular Poetry), on the other hand, was banned the following year. Some of her unprinted poetry, including songs, are kept in Stockholm today. For her songs she partly composed with her own melodies, partly she wrote them on known secular songs for the common house music with her children.

== Sources ==
- Höijer, Anna Orena i Wilhelmina Stålberg, Anteckningar om svenska qvinnor (1864)
- Hoyers, Anna Ovena, i Carl Frederik Bricka, Dansk biografisk Lexikon (första utgåvan, 1894)
- Kjellander Rune, Familjen Hoyer i Schlesvig-Holstein och Sverige (1989)
- Biography for Anna Ovena Hoyers at New German Biography
- Women and the Reformation: Anna Hoyers
