= Olderup =

- Municipality
- Coat of arms

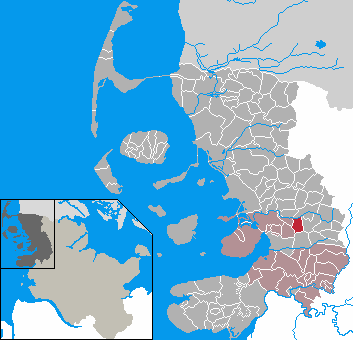
- Location of Olderup within Nordfriesland district
- Interactive map of Olderup
- Location within Germany Location within Schleswig-Holstein
- Coordinates: 54°31′N 9°7′E
- Country: Germany
- State: Schleswig-Holstein
- District: Nordfriesland
- Municipal assoc.: Nordsee-Treene

Government
  - Mayor: Gerd Martens

Area
  - Total: 9.95 km^{2} (3.84 sq mi)
- Elevation: 14 m (46 ft)

Population (2025-12-31)
  - Total: 483
  - Density: 48.5/km^{2} (126/sq mi)
- Time zone: UTC+01:00 (CET)
  - Summer (DST): UTC+02:00 (CEST)
- Postal codes: 25860
- Dialling codes: 04846
- Vehicle registration: NF
- Website: www.amt-hattstedt.de

Olderup is a municipality in the district of Nordfriesland, in Schleswig-Holstein, Germany.
