= Seeth =

Seeth Sæd / Seet
- Municipality
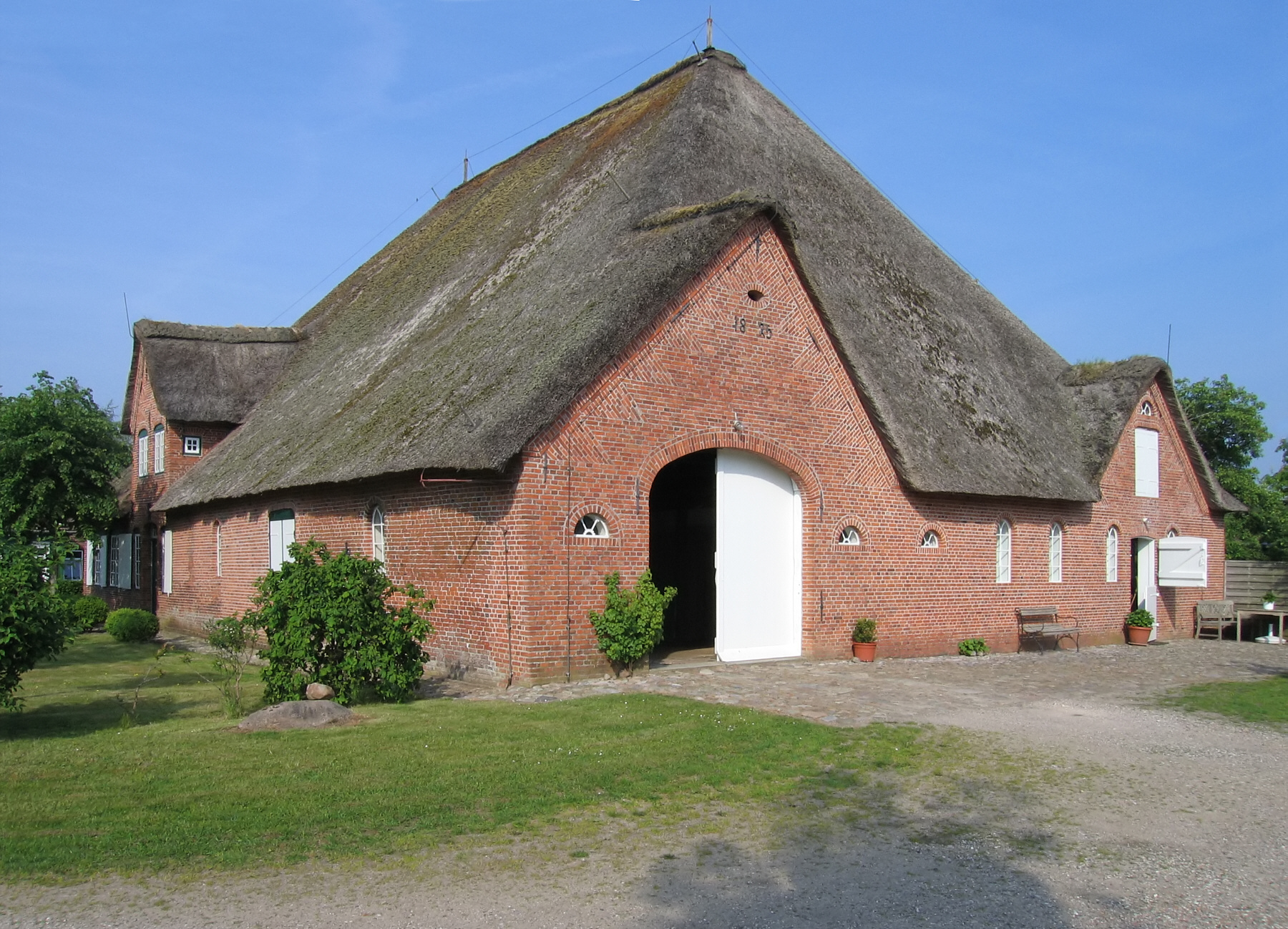
- Haubarg in the village

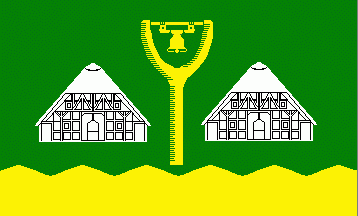
- Flag Coat of arms

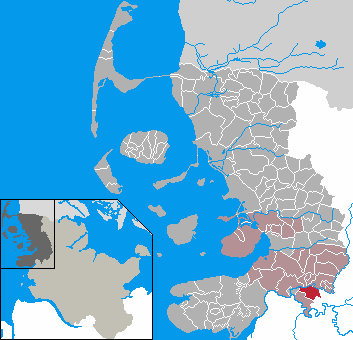
- Location of Seeth; Sæd / Seet within Nordfriesland district
- Interactive map of Seeth; Sæd / Seet
- Location within Germany Location within Schleswig-Holstein
- Coordinates: 54°22′3″N 9°9′53″E
- Country: Germany
- State: Schleswig-Holstein
- District: Nordfriesland
- Municipal assoc.: Nordsee-Treene

Government
  - Mayor: Ernst Schulz

Area
  - Total: 13.76 km^{2} (5.31 sq mi)
- Elevation: 3 m (9.8 ft)

Population (2025-12-31)
  - Total: 2,412
  - Density: 175.3/km^{2} (454.0/sq mi)
- Time zone: UTC+01:00 (CET)
  - Summer (DST): UTC+02:00 (CEST)
- Postal codes: 25878
- Dialling codes: 04881
- Vehicle registration: NF

Seeth (German pronunciation: [zeːt]; Danish: Sæd; North Frisian: Seet) is a municipality in the district of Nordfriesland, in Schleswig-Holstein, Germany.
