= Elisabeth-Sophien-Koog =

- Municipality
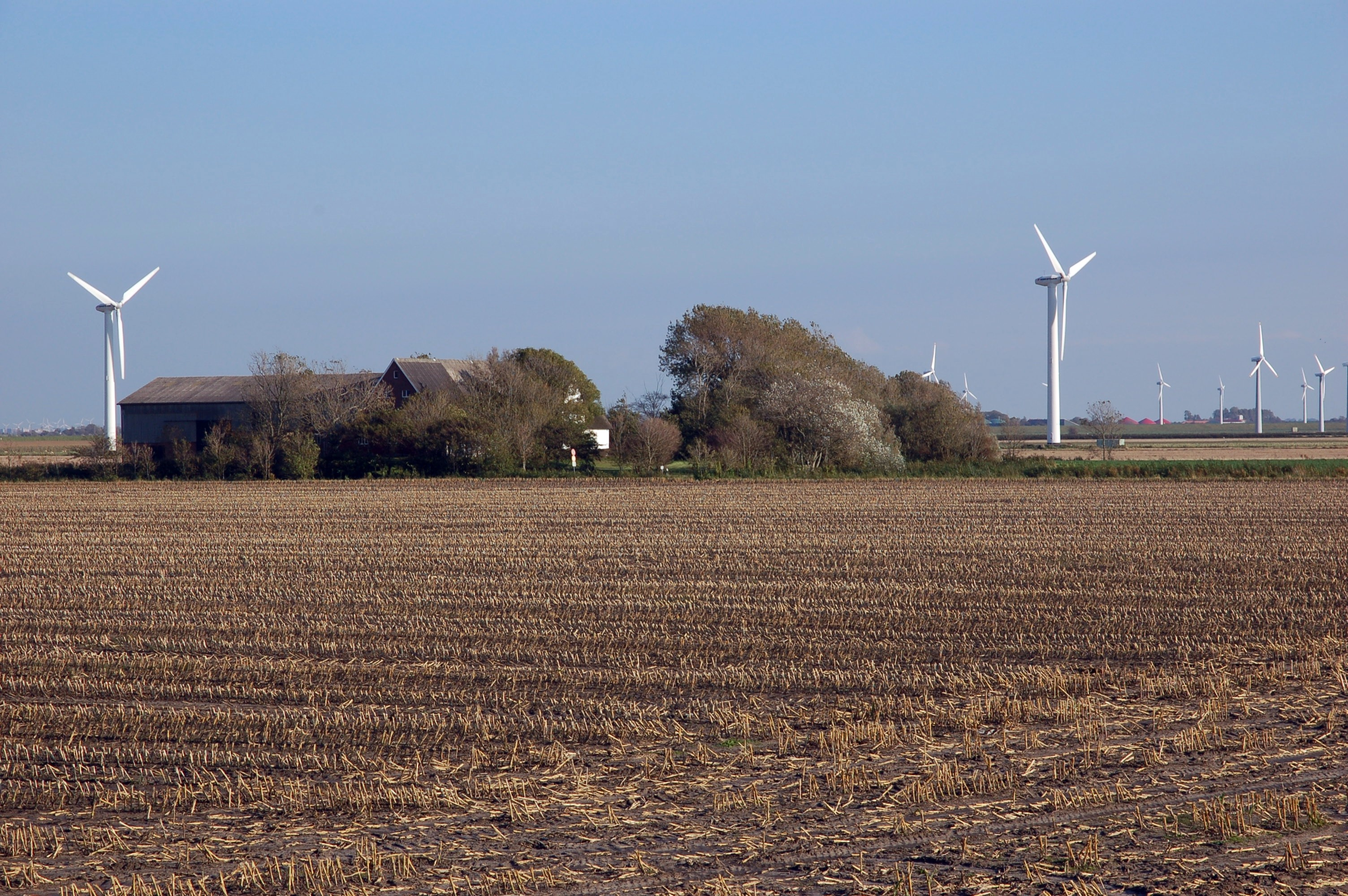
- A farmstead in Elisabeth-Sophien-Koog

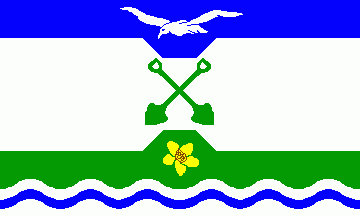
- Flag Coat of arms

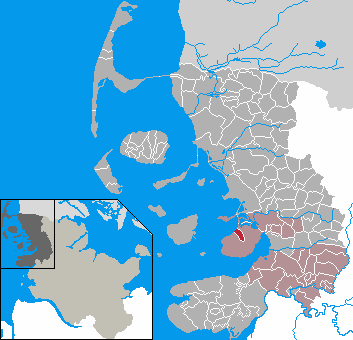
- Location of Elisabeth-Sophien-Koog within Nordfriesland district
- Interactive map of Elisabeth-Sophien-Koog
- Location within Germany Location within Schleswig-Holstein
- Coordinates: 54°30′31″N 8°52′49″E
- Country: Germany
- State: Schleswig-Holstein
- District: Nordfriesland
- Municipal assoc.: Nordsee-Treene

Government
  - Mayor: Ute Clausen

Area
  - Total: 5.29 km^{2} (2.04 sq mi)
- Elevation: 1 m (3.3 ft)

Population (2025-12-31)
  - Total: 56
  - Density: 11/km^{2} (27/sq mi)
- Time zone: UTC+01:00 (CET)
  - Summer (DST): UTC+02:00 (CEST)
- Postal codes: 25845
- Dialling codes: 04842
- Vehicle registration: NF
- Website: www.nordstrand.de

Elisabeth-Sophien-Koog is a municipality in the district of Nordfriesland, in Schleswig-Holstein, Germany. It occupies a small part in the northwest of Nordstrand peninsula.

The municipality is located in and named after the polder (German: Koog), financed by the banker Jean Henri Desmercières and named in honour of his wife Elisabeth Sophie Desmercières.

== Notable people ==
- Peter Harry Carstensen (b. 1947), former Minister President of Schleswig-Holstein
