= Süderhöft =

- Municipality
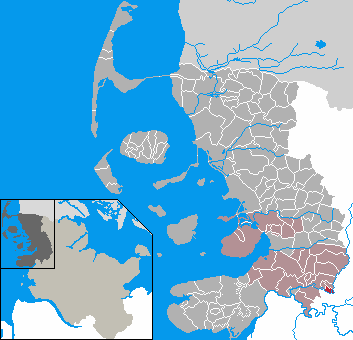
- Location of Süderhöft within Nordfriesland district
- Interactive map of Süderhöft
- Location within Germany Location within Schleswig-Holstein
- Coordinates: 54°22′55″N 9°14′30″E
- Country: Germany
- State: Schleswig-Holstein
- District: Nordfriesland
- Municipal assoc.: Nordsee-Treene

Government
  - Mayor: Thomas Meier

Area
  - Total: 2.6 km^{2} (1.0 sq mi)
- Elevation: 5 m (16 ft)

Population (2025-12-31)
  - Total: 22
  - Density: 8.5/km^{2} (22/sq mi)
- Time zone: UTC+01:00 (CET)
  - Summer (DST): UTC+02:00 (CEST)
- Postal codes: 25876
- Dialling codes: 04884
- Vehicle registration: NF

Süderhöft (Danish: Sønderhøft) is a municipality in the district of Nordfriesland, in Schleswig-Holstein, Germany.
