= Rantrum =

- Municipality
- Coat of arms

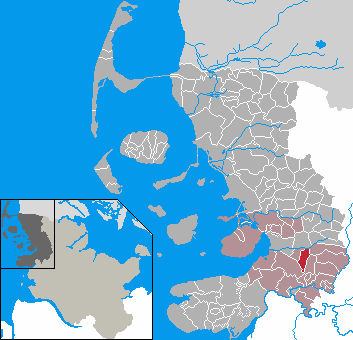
- Location of Rantrum within Nordfriesland district
- Interactive map of Rantrum
- Location within Germany Location within Schleswig-Holstein
- Coordinates: 54°26′N 9°7′E
- Country: Germany
- State: Schleswig-Holstein
- District: Nordfriesland
- Municipal assoc.: Nordsee-Treene

Government
  - Mayor: Christian Franke (WIR)

Area
  - Total: 13.72 km^{2} (5.30 sq mi)
- Elevation: 3 m (9.8 ft)

Population (2025-12-31)
  - Total: 1,971
  - Density: 143.7/km^{2} (372.1/sq mi)
- Time zone: UTC+01:00 (CET)
  - Summer (DST): UTC+02:00 (CEST)
- Postal codes: 25873
- Dialling codes: 04848
- Vehicle registration: NF

Rantrum is a municipality in the district of Nordfriesland, in Schleswig-Holstein, Germany.
