= Wittbek =

- Municipality
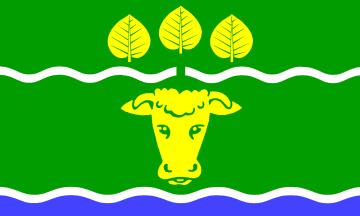
- Flag Coat of arms

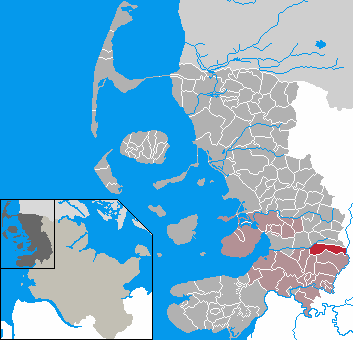
- Location of Wittbek within Nordfriesland district
- Interactive map of Wittbek
- Location within Germany Location within Schleswig-Holstein
- Coordinates: 54°28′31″N 9°12′13″E
- Country: Germany
- State: Schleswig-Holstein
- District: Nordfriesland
- Municipal assoc.: Nordsee-Treene

Government
  - Mayor: Hans Erhardt Clausen

Area
  - Total: 19.91 km^{2} (7.69 sq mi)
- Elevation: 25 m (82 ft)

Population (2025-12-31)
  - Total: 790
  - Density: 40/km^{2} (100/sq mi)
- Time zone: UTC+01:00 (CET)
  - Summer (DST): UTC+02:00 (CEST)
- Postal codes: 25872
- Dialling codes: 04845
- Vehicle registration: NF

Wittbek (Danish: Vedbæk) is a municipality in the district of Nordfriesland, in Schleswig-Holstein, Germany.
