= Wisch, Nordfriesland =

Wisch Visk
- Municipality
- Coat of arms

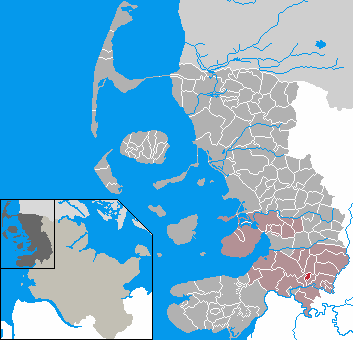
- Location of Wisch; Visk within Nordfriesland district
- Interactive map of Wisch; Visk
- Location within Germany Location within Schleswig-Holstein
- Coordinates: 54°24′38″N 9°9′20″E
- Country: Germany
- State: Schleswig-Holstein
- District: Nordfriesland
- Municipal assoc.: Nordsee-Treene

Government
  - Mayor: Norbert Plitzko

Area
  - Total: 3.05 km^{2} (1.18 sq mi)
- Elevation: 15 m (49 ft)

Population (2025-12-31)
  - Total: 103
  - Density: 33.8/km^{2} (87.5/sq mi)
- Time zone: UTC+01:00 (CET)
  - Summer (DST): UTC+02:00 (CEST)
- Postal codes: 25876
- Dialling codes: 04884
- Vehicle registration: NF

Wisch (German pronunciation: [vɪʃ]; Danish: Visk; North Frisian: Väsk) is a municipality in the district of Nordfriesland, in Schleswig-Holstein, Germany.
