= Winnert =

Winnert Vinnert/Vinnerød
- Municipality
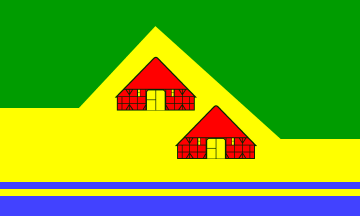
- Flag Coat of arms

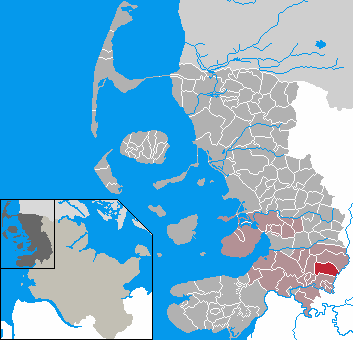
- Location of Winnert; Vinnert/Vinnerød within Nordfriesland district
- Interactive map of Winnert; Vinnert/Vinnerød
- Location within Germany Location within Schleswig-Holstein
- Coordinates: 54°26′5″N 9°12′1″E
- Country: Germany
- State: Schleswig-Holstein
- District: Nordfriesland
- Municipal assoc.: Nordsee-Treene

Government
  - Mayor: Jutta Rese

Area
  - Total: 18.88 km^{2} (7.29 sq mi)
- Elevation: 18 m (59 ft)

Population (2025-12-31)
  - Total: 732
  - Density: 38.8/km^{2} (100/sq mi)
- Time zone: UTC+01:00 (CET)
  - Summer (DST): UTC+02:00 (CEST)
- Postal codes: 25887
- Dialling codes: 04845
- Vehicle registration: NF

Winnert (Danish: Vinnert or Vinnerød) is a municipality in the district of Nordfriesland, in Schleswig-Holstein, Germany.
