= Uelvesbüll =

Uelvesbüll Ylvesbøl
- Municipality
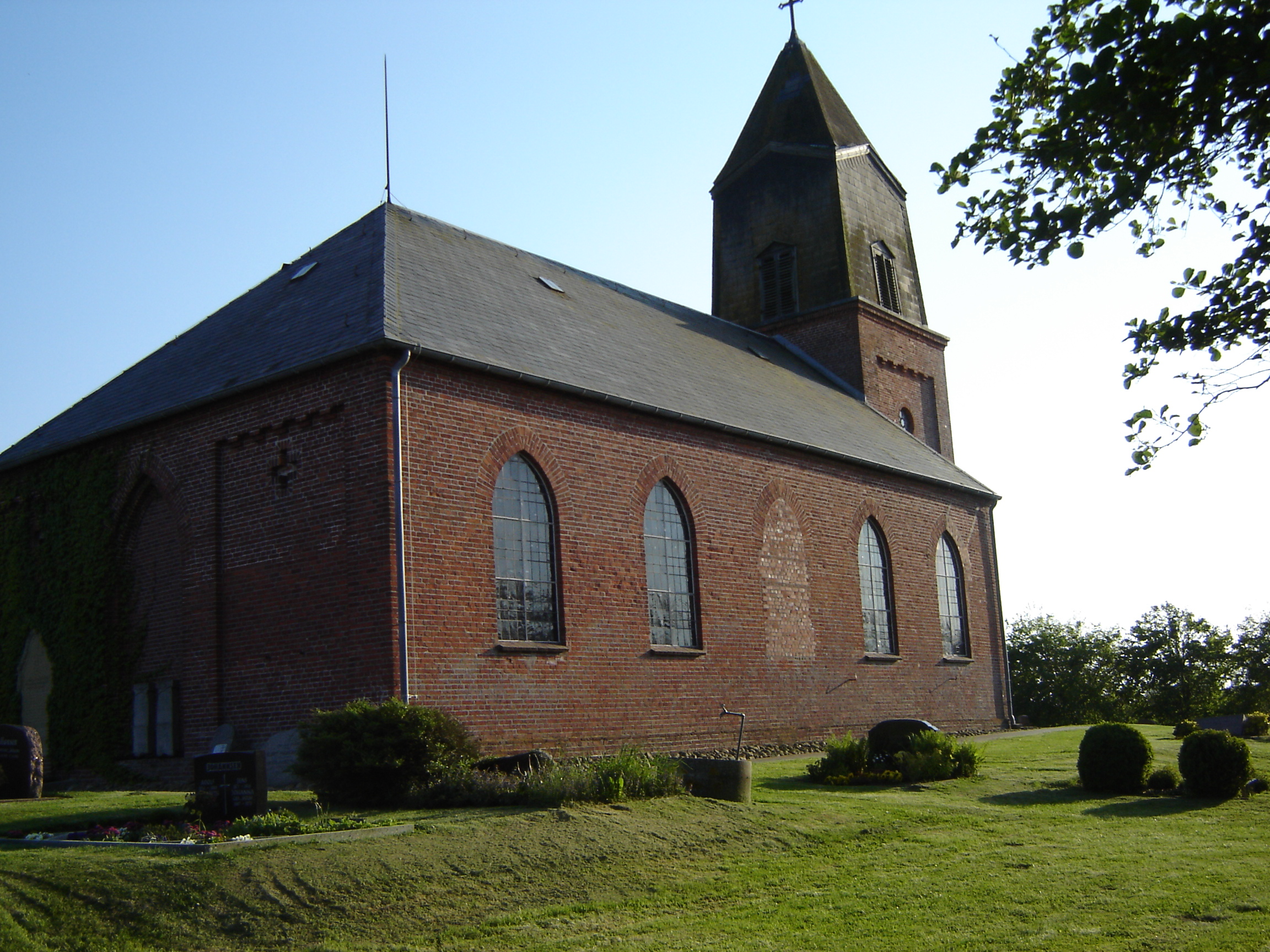
- St. Nicholas' church

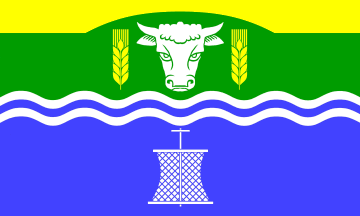
- Flag Coat of arms

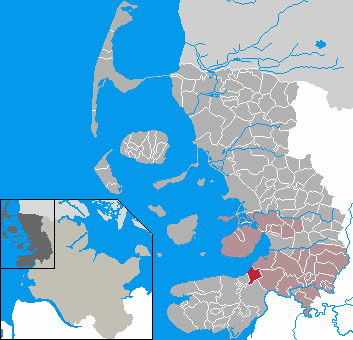
- Location of Uelvesbüll; Ylvesbøl within Nordfriesland district
- Interactive map of Uelvesbüll; Ylvesbøl
- Location within Germany Location within Schleswig-Holstein
- Coordinates: 54°25′N 8°55′E
- Country: Germany
- State: Schleswig-Holstein
- District: Nordfriesland
- Municipal assoc.: Nordsee-Treene

Government
  - Mayor: Richard Wiborg

Area
  - Total: 10.23 km^{2} (3.95 sq mi)
- Elevation: 0 m (0 ft)

Population (2025-12-31)
  - Total: 280
  - Density: 27/km^{2} (71/sq mi)
- Time zone: UTC+01:00 (CET)
  - Summer (DST): UTC+02:00 (CEST)
- Postal codes: 25889
- Dialling codes: 04864
- Vehicle registration: NF

Uelvesbüll (German pronunciation: [ˈʏlvəsˌbʏl]; Danish: Ylvesbøl) is a municipality in the district of Nordfriesland, in Schleswig-Holstein, Germany.
