= Fresendelf =

- Municipality
- Coat of arms

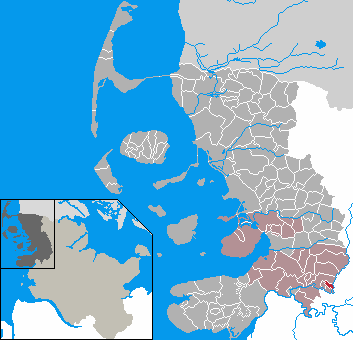
- Location of Fresendelf within Nordfriesland district
- Interactive map of Fresendelf
- Location within Germany Location within Schleswig-Holstein
- Coordinates: 54°23′42″N 9°14′58″E
- Country: Germany
- State: Schleswig-Holstein
- District: Nordfriesland
- Municipal assoc.: Nordsee-Treene

Government
  - Mayor: Hans Peter Lorenzen

Area
  - Total: 2.6 km^{2} (1.0 sq mi)
- Elevation: 5 m (16 ft)

Population (2025-12-31)
  - Total: 85
  - Density: 33/km^{2} (85/sq mi)
- Time zone: UTC+01:00 (CET)
  - Summer (DST): UTC+02:00 (CEST)
- Postal codes: 25876
- Dialling codes: 04884
- Vehicle registration: NF

Fresendelf is a municipality in the district of Nordfriesland, in Schleswig-Holstein, Germany.
