= Koldenbüttel =

- Municipality
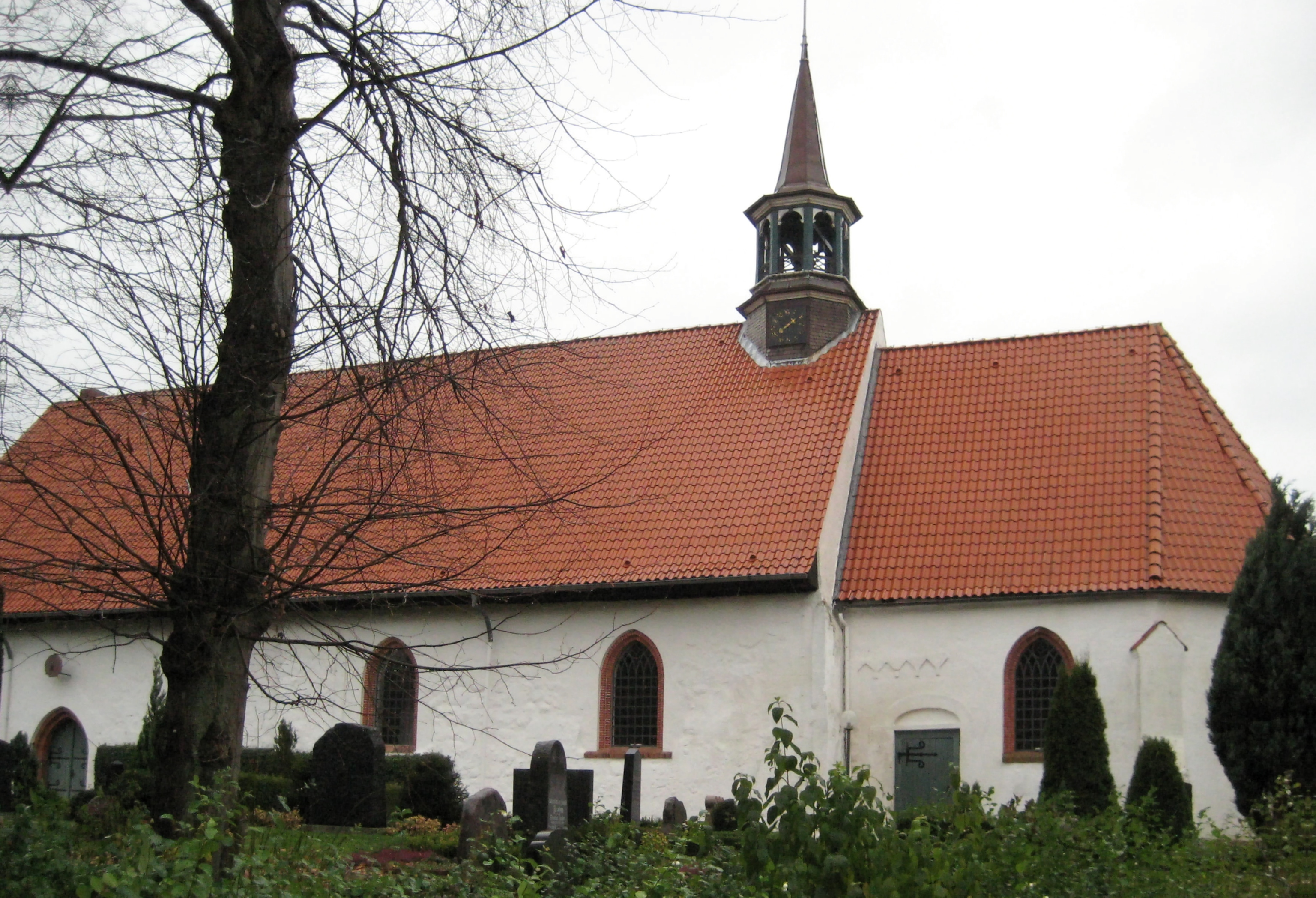
- Saint Leonard Church

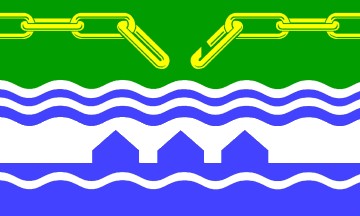
- Flag Coat of arms

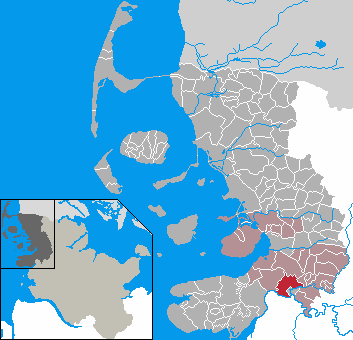
- Location of Koldenbüttel within Nordfriesland district
- Interactive map of Koldenbüttel
- Location within Germany Location within Schleswig-Holstein
- Coordinates: 54°23′11″N 9°4′4″E
- Country: Germany
- State: Schleswig-Holstein
- District: Nordfriesland
- Municipal assoc.: Nordsee-Treene

Government
  - Mayor: Detlef Honnens

Area
  - Total: 25.76 km^{2} (9.95 sq mi)
- Elevation: 2 m (6.6 ft)

Population (2025-12-31)
  - Total: 914
  - Density: 35.5/km^{2} (91.9/sq mi)
- Time zone: UTC+01:00 (CET)
  - Summer (DST): UTC+02:00 (CEST)
- Postal codes: 25840
- Dialling codes: 04881
- Vehicle registration: NF

Koldenbüttel (North Frisian: Koolnbütel, Low German: Kombüddel, Danish: Koldenbøl, Koldenbyttel) is a municipality in the district of Nordfriesland, in Schleswig-Holstein, Germany.

== Geography und infrastructure ==
Koldenbüttel lies in the Eider Treene-Losiny about 8 miles south of Husum and just west of Friedrichstadt at the confluence of the Eider and the Treene in the Marsh. Koldenbüttel applies as Eiderstedt's most eastern village.

Until the Treene's damming up in 1570 the village was suspended by Storm surges from North Sea-water flowing in the Eider and the Treene. Now there is a road at the dike's top leading from Koldenbüttel to Friedrichstadt

The Bundesstraße 202 runs through the town; it connects the village with Friedrichstadt.

At the Railway Tönning-Husum, which was opened in 1854, there was a small train station called "Büttel". After finishing the "Marschbahn" this breakpoint was closed down because of a central train station in Friedrichstadt.

== History ==
Koldenbüttel goes back to an earlier settlement called "Büttel", which was left and colonized again 1,000 to 1,200 years ago. The name means: "Cold (in the sense of cooled, extinct) settlement."

The St. Leonhardt's church was built around the year 1200 by Frisian immigrants, which were settling at Eiderstedt around 1100. At the same place had been a sacred fountain in Pre-Christian times. The village has been documented first in the year 1352. The wooden, standalone bell steeple is the oldest of its type in Schleswig-Holstein; it has been proved that the wood used was produced in 1461. The rectory was built in 1658.

== Townscape and culture ==
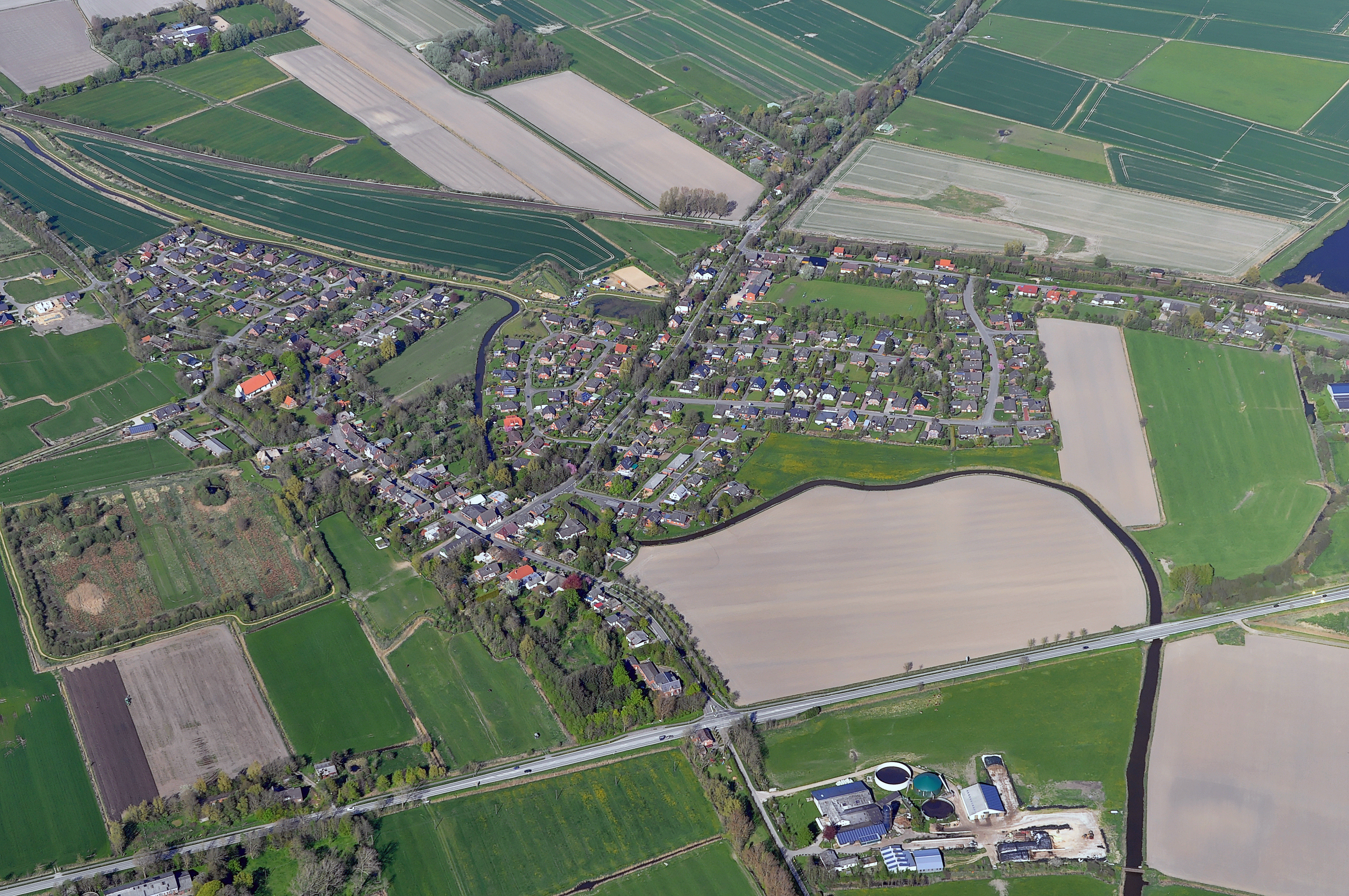
Aerial view of Koldenbüttel

The church village Koldenbüttel is surrounded by many farmsteads and Katen (the Low German word for cottage/small house), which are often built at "Warften" in different, to municipality ground belonging "Kögen". Of the once 35 Haubargen (special farmhouses, built on 4 to 10 wooden stands in the ground) only one is left: The Riesbüllhof. The Schütthof burnt down in December 2008.

Next to the church stands the former deacon's house. This was rebuilt in 1969, but it still has the gable from the original house, which was built in 1614. The rectory is located in the old citizen house, which was built in 1658, since 1754.

There has been a Koldenbüttler summer with concerts and art exhibitions since 1997.

== Economy ==
In Koldenbüttel there are large residentials. A lot of the citizens work in the nearby towns Friedrichstadt, Husum or Heide.

== Personalities ==
- Anna Ovena Hoyer (1584−1655), German Baroque poet
- Wilhelm Peters (1815−1883), German naturalist and zoologist
- Christian Heinrich Friedrich Peters (1813−1890), German-American astronomer
