= Witzwort =

Witzwort Vitsvort
- Municipality
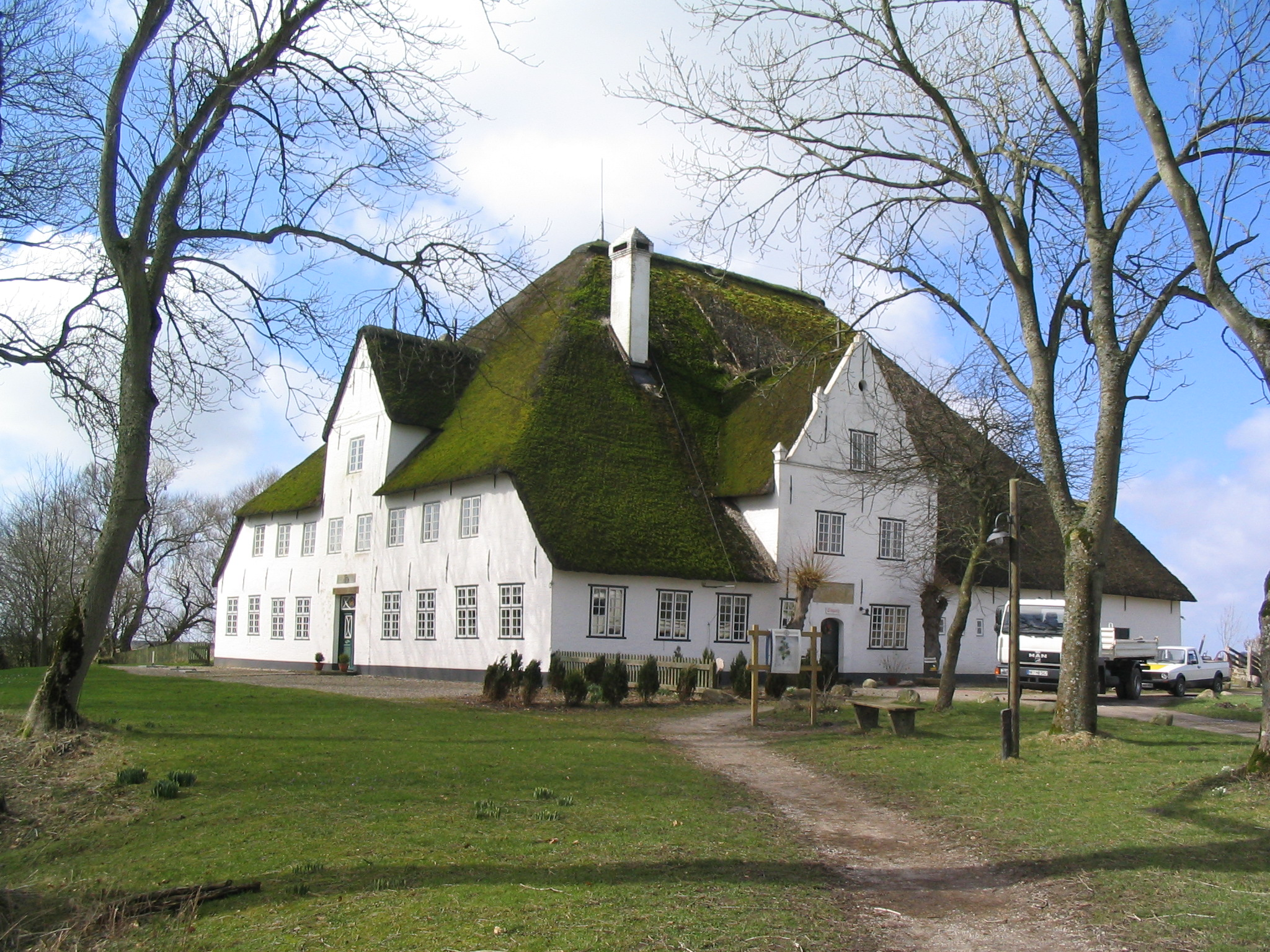
- Red Haubarg

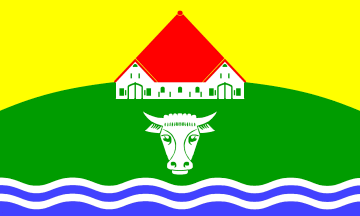
- Flag Coat of arms

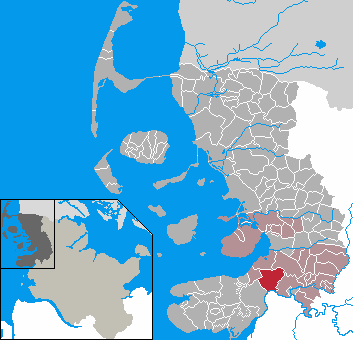
- Location of Witzwort; Vitsvort within Nordfriesland district
- Interactive map of Witzwort; Vitsvort
- Location within Germany Location within Schleswig-Holstein
- Coordinates: 54°24′6″N 8°59′10″E
- Country: Germany
- State: Schleswig-Holstein
- District: Nordfriesland
- Municipal assoc.: Nordsee-Treene

Government
  - Mayor: Johann Sievers

Area
  - Total: 28.14 km^{2} (10.86 sq mi)
- Elevation: 2 m (6.6 ft)

Population (2025-12-31)
  - Total: 1,065
  - Density: 37.85/km^{2} (98.02/sq mi)
- Time zone: UTC+01:00 (CET)
  - Summer (DST): UTC+02:00 (CEST)
- Postal codes: 25889
- Dialling codes: 04864
- Vehicle registration: NF
- Website: witzwort.de

Witzwort (Danish: Vitsvort) is a municipality in the district of Nordfriesland, in Schleswig-Holstein, Germany.
