= Schwabstedt =

Schwabstedt Svavsted
- Municipality
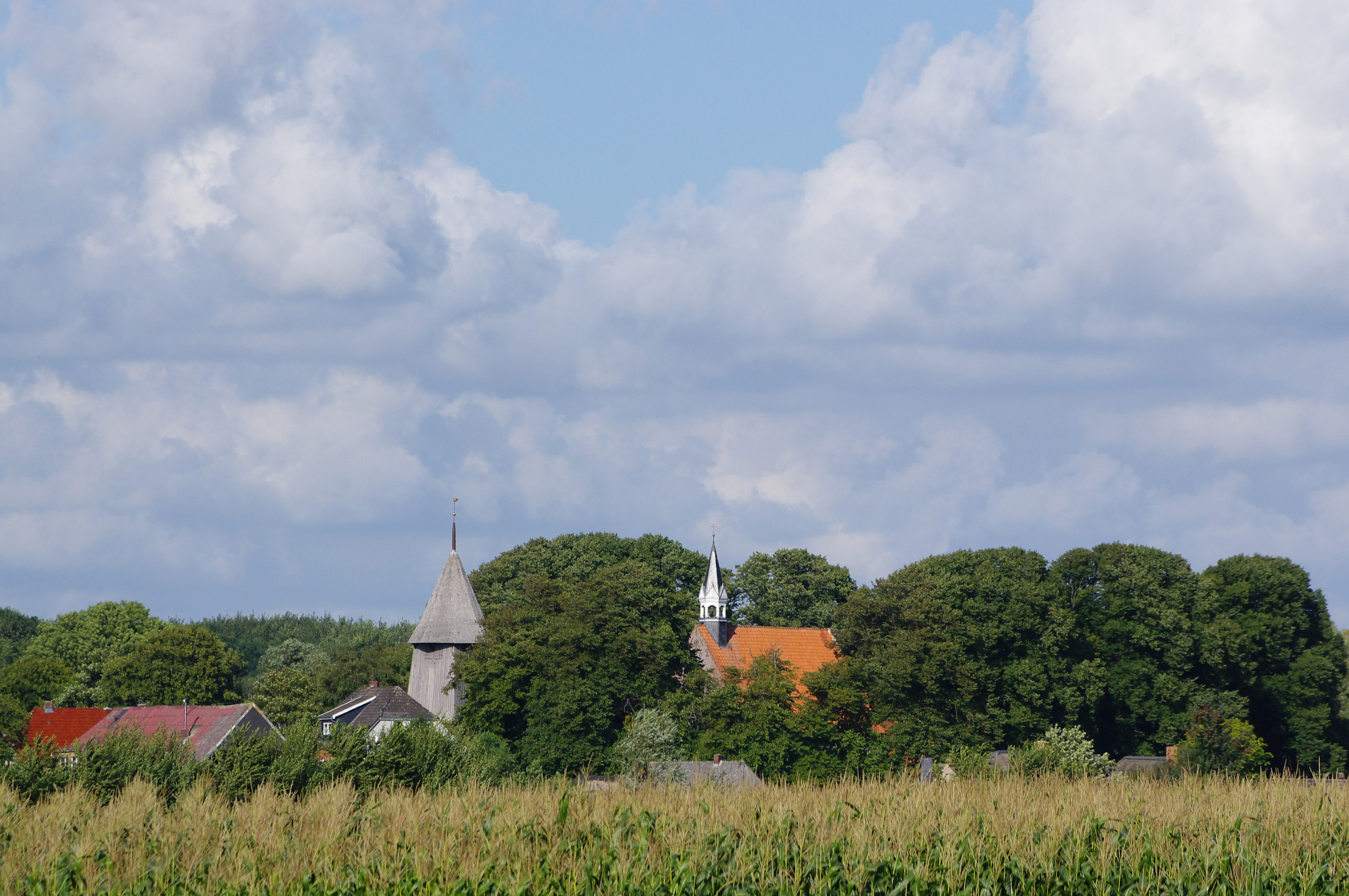

- Coat of arms

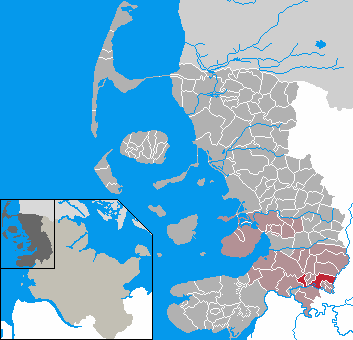
- Location of Schwabstedt; Svavsted within Nordfriesland district
- Interactive map of Schwabstedt; Svavsted
- Location within Germany Location within Schleswig-Holstein
- Coordinates: 54°23′45″N 9°11′14″E
- Country: Germany
- State: Schleswig-Holstein
- District: Nordfriesland
- Municipal assoc.: Nordsee-Treene

Government
  - Mayor: Heinrich Thomsen

Area
  - Total: 19.64 km^{2} (7.58 sq mi)
- Elevation: 12 m (39 ft)

Population (2025-12-31)
  - Total: 1,339
  - Density: 68.18/km^{2} (176.6/sq mi)
- Time zone: UTC+01:00 (CET)
  - Summer (DST): UTC+02:00 (CEST)
- Postal codes: 25876
- Dialling codes: 04884
- Vehicle registration: NF
- Website: www.amt-nordsee- treene.de

Schwabstedt (Danish: Svavsted, North Frisian: Swåbstää) is a municipality in the district of Northern Frisia (Nordfriesland), in Schleswig-Holstein, Germany.

== History ==
In 1268 Bishop Bunde of Schleswig sold his castle Gottorp to Eric II, Duke of Schleswig and moved his residence to Schwabstedt.

== Education ==
In 1602, in the year of his investiture, the last Bishop of Schleswig, Prince Ulrik of Denmark (1578–1624, Rühn; titular duke of Holstein and Schleswig, son of Frederick II of Denmark and Sophie of Mecklenburg-Güstrow) founded and endowed the higher school, today's Herzog-Ulrich-Schule.

== Sights ==
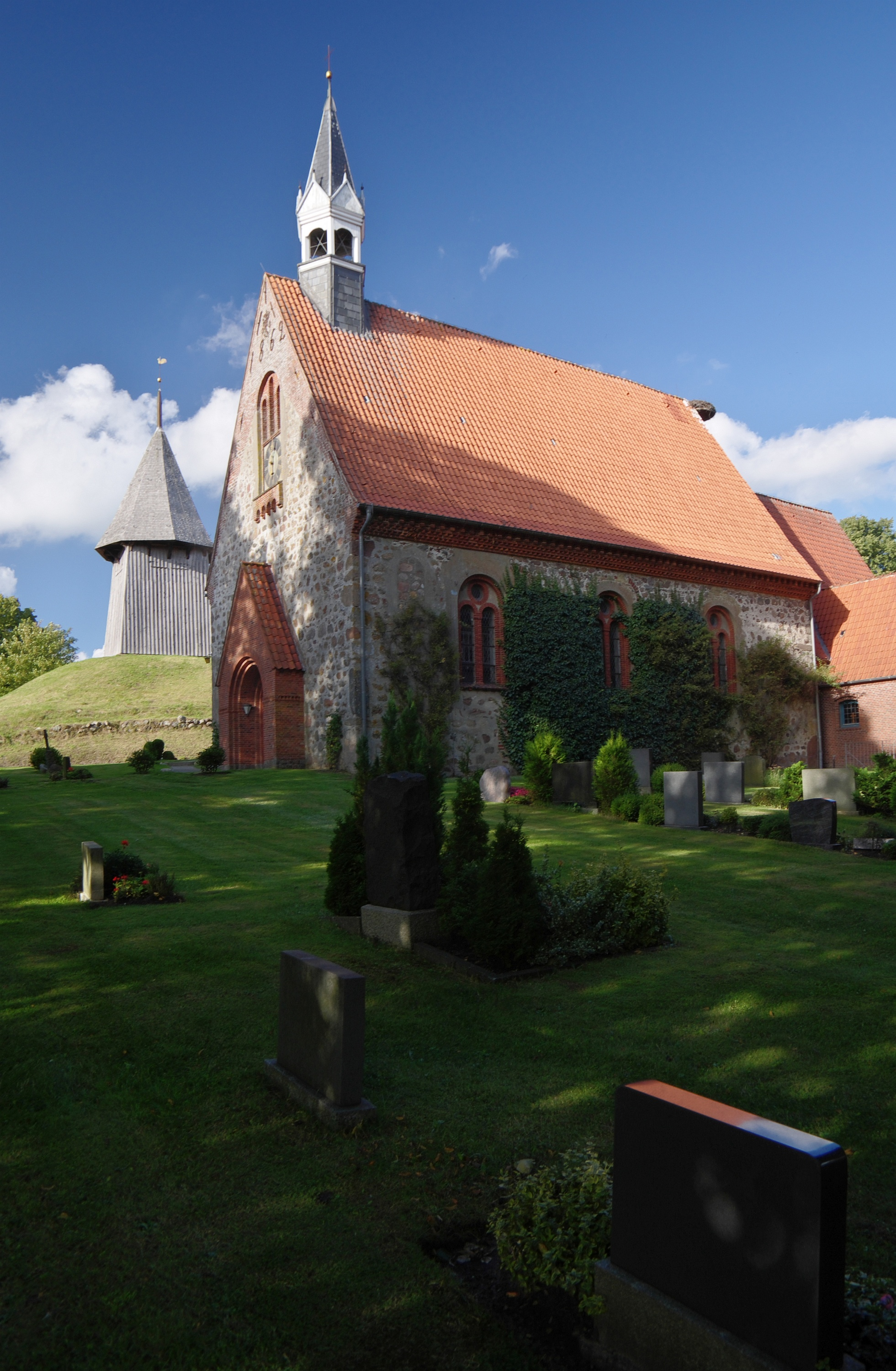
St. James' Church

The Lutheran St. James' Church (German: St. Jakobi-Kirche) was erected around 1160 in Romanesque style from boulders, but later often altered. It is decorated by a carved altar of an unknown artist of about 1520. It stood originally in Husum and Schwabstedt acquired it in 1834 together with paintings of the Twelve Apostles and scenes of the Passion of Jesus. They are pieces of the Tönning-based Dutch painter Govert van Achten, who created them in 1602. Bishop Ulrik donated the carved pulpit, by Hans Pepper from Rendsburg, and the wooden baptismal font in 1606. His many titles and coats-of-arms cover pulpit and font.
