= Arlewatt =

Arlewatt Arlevad
- Municipality
- Coat of arms

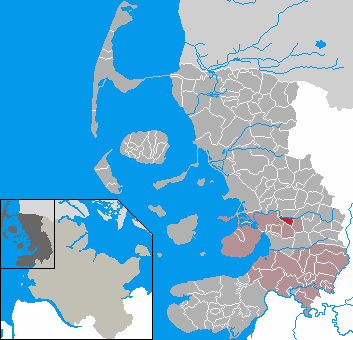
- Location of Arlewatt; Arlevad within Nordfriesland district
- Interactive map of Arlewatt; Arlevad
- Location within Germany Location within Schleswig-Holstein
- Coordinates: 54°31′N 9°4′E
- Country: Germany
- State: Schleswig-Holstein
- District: Nordfriesland
- Municipal assoc.: Nordsee-Treene

Government
  - Mayor: Silke Clausen

Area
  - Total: 5.68 km^{2} (2.19 sq mi)
- Elevation: 11 m (36 ft)

Population (2025-12-31)
  - Total: 342
  - Density: 60.2/km^{2} (156/sq mi)
- Time zone: UTC+01:00 (CET)
  - Summer (DST): UTC+02:00 (CEST)
- Postal codes: 25860
- Dialling codes: 04846
- Vehicle registration: NF
- Website: www.amt- hattstedt.de

Arlewatt (Danish: Arlevad) is a municipality in the district of Nordfriesland, in Schleswig-Holstein, Germany.
