= Wobbenbüll =

- Municipality
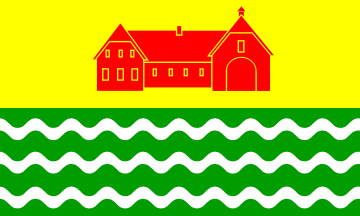
- Flag Coat of arms

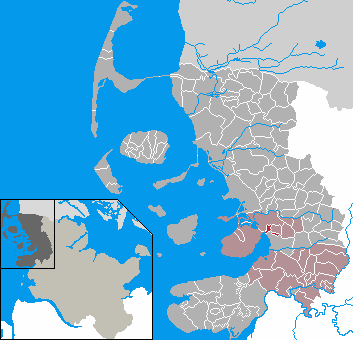
- Location of Wobbenbüll within Nordfriesland district
- Interactive map of Wobbenbüll
- Location within Germany Location within Schleswig-Holstein
- Coordinates: 54°31′N 9°0′E
- Country: Germany
- State: Schleswig-Holstein
- District: Nordfriesland
- Municipal assoc.: Nordsee-Treene

Government
  - Mayor: Reiner Hetzel

Area
  - Total: 1.69 km^{2} (0.65 sq mi)
- Elevation: 5 m (16 ft)

Population (2025-12-31)
  - Total: 478
  - Density: 283/km^{2} (733/sq mi)
- Time zone: UTC+01:00 (CET)
  - Summer (DST): UTC+02:00 (CEST)
- Postal codes: 25856
- Dialling codes: 04846
- Vehicle registration: NF
- Website: www.amt- hattstedt.de

Wobbenbüll (Danish: Vobbenbøl, North Frisian: Wååbel) is a municipality in the district of Nordfriesland, in Schleswig-Holstein, Germany.

== Sons and daughters of the community ==
- Harro Harring (1798-1870), revolutionary, poet and painter
