= Ramstedt, Germany =

Ramstedt Ramsted
- Municipality
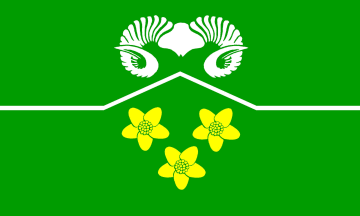
- Flag Coat of arms

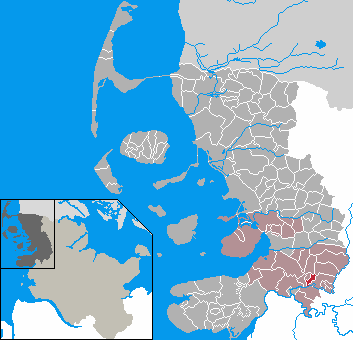
- Location of Ramstedt within Nordfriesland district
- Interactive map of Ramstedt
- Location within Germany Location within Schleswig-Holstein
- Coordinates: 54°23′N 9°10′E
- Country: Germany
- State: Schleswig-Holstein
- District: Nordfriesland
- Municipal assoc.: Nordsee-Treene

Government
  - Mayor: Christa Reese

Area
  - Total: 5.42 km^{2} (2.09 sq mi)
- Elevation: 5 m (16 ft)

Population (2025-12-31)
  - Total: 430
  - Density: 79/km^{2} (210/sq mi)
- Time zone: UTC+01:00 (CET)
  - Summer (DST): UTC+02:00 (CEST)
- Postal codes: 25876
- Dialling codes: 04884
- Vehicle registration: NF

Ramstedt (German pronunciation: [ˈʁamʃtɛt]; Danish: Ramsted) is a municipality in the district of Nordfriesland, in Schleswig-Holstein, Germany.
