= Ostenfeld, Nordfriesland =

Ostenfeld Østerfjolde
- Municipality
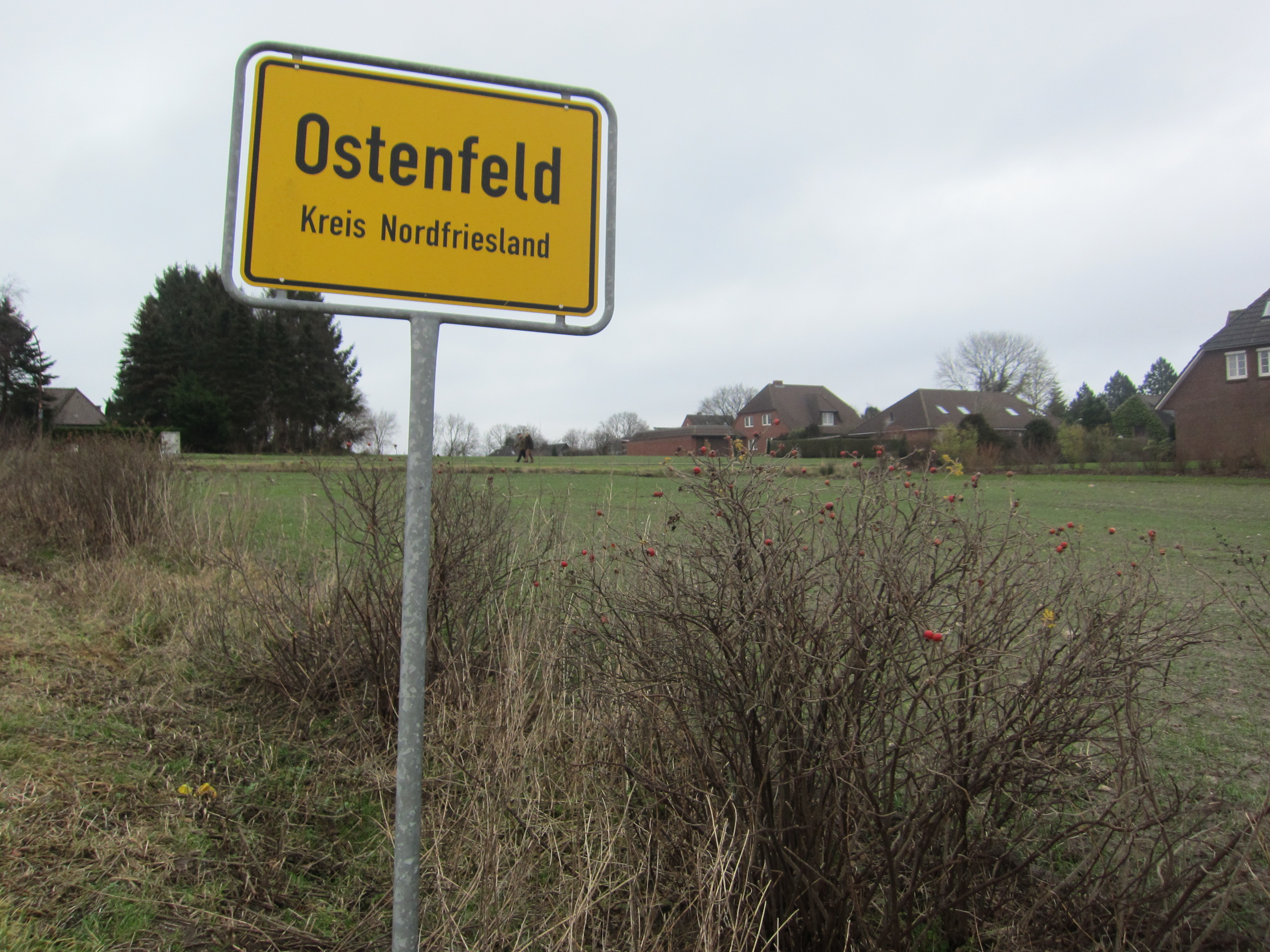

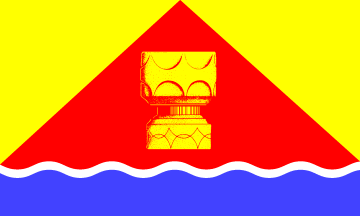
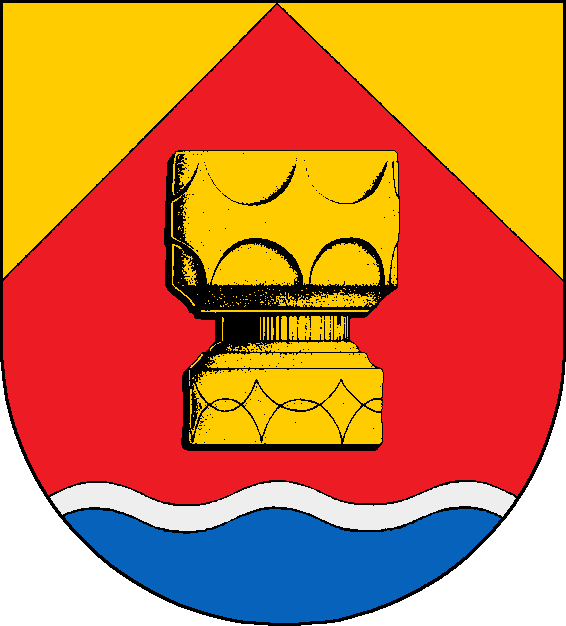
- Flag Coat of arms

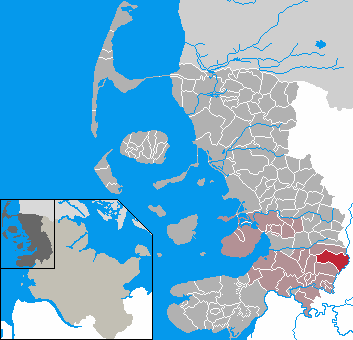
- Location of Ostenfeld; Østerfjolde within Nordfriesland district
- Interactive map of Ostenfeld; Østerfjolde
- Location within Germany Location within Schleswig-Holstein
- Coordinates: 54°28′N 9°13′E
- Country: Germany
- State: Schleswig-Holstein
- District: Nordfriesland
- Municipal assoc.: Nordsee-Treene

Government
  - Mayor: Eva-Maria Kühl

Area
  - Total: 27.67 km^{2} (10.68 sq mi)
- Elevation: 46 m (151 ft)

Population (2025-12-31)
  - Total: 1,593
  - Density: 57.57/km^{2} (149.1/sq mi)
- Time zone: UTC+01:00 (CET)
  - Summer (DST): UTC+02:00 (CEST)
- Postal codes: 25872
- Dialling codes: 04845
- Vehicle registration: NF

Ostenfeld (German pronunciation: [ˈɔstn̩fɛlt]; Danish: Østerfjolde) is a municipality in the district of Nordfriesland, in Schleswig-Holstein, Germany.
