= Drage, Nordfriesland =

Drage
- Municipality
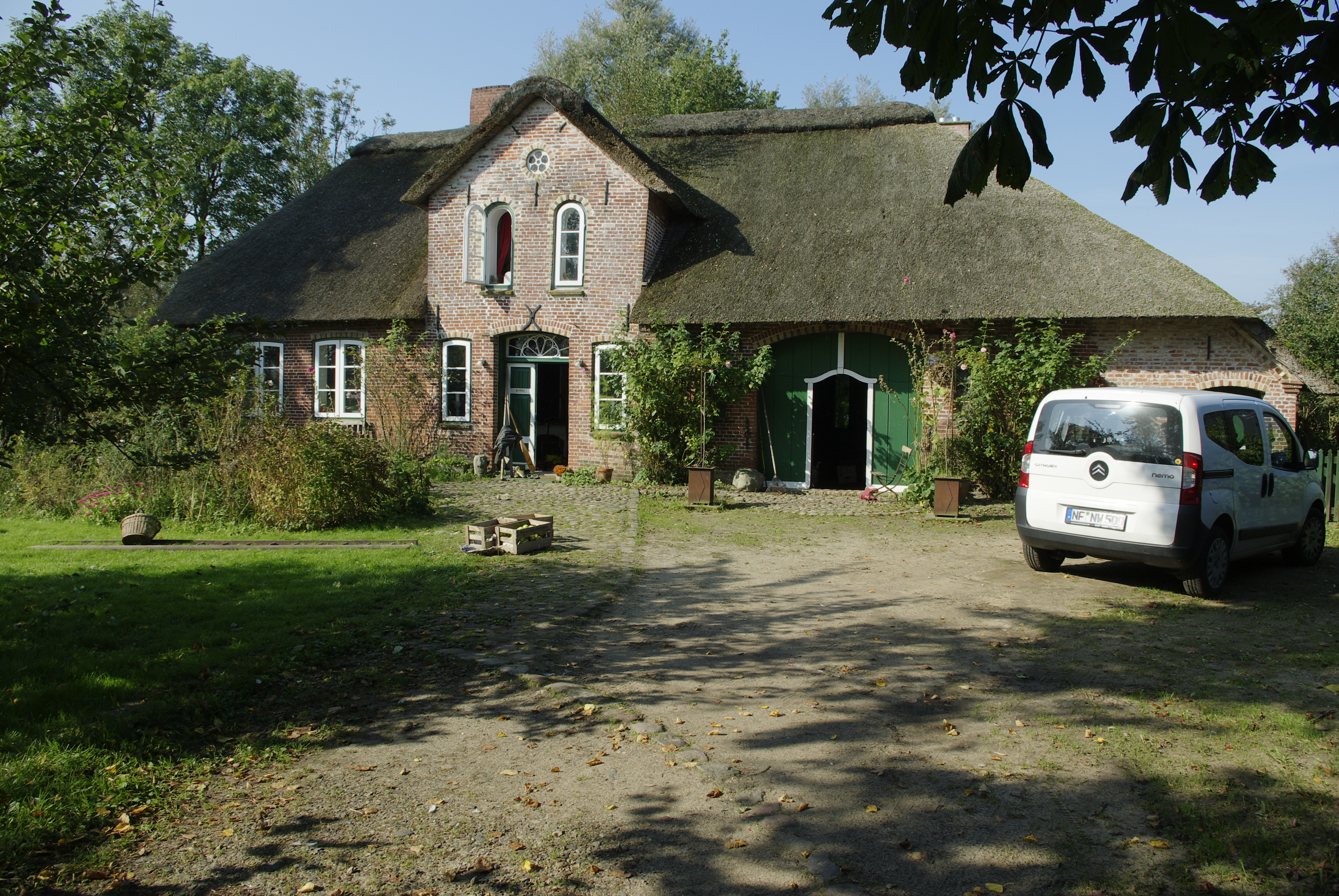
- Historical house in Drage

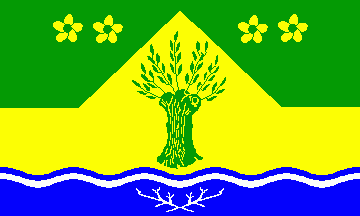
- Flag Coat of arms

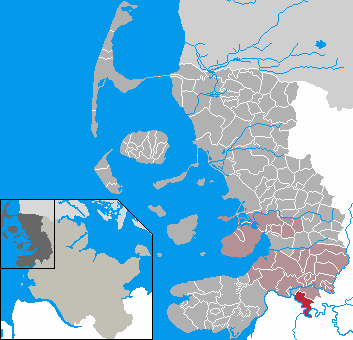
- Location of Drage within Nordfriesland district
- Interactive map of Drage
- Location within Germany Location within Schleswig-Holstein
- Coordinates: 54°21′21″N 9°9′41″E
- Country: Germany
- State: Schleswig-Holstein
- District: Nordfriesland
- Municipal assoc.: Nordsee-Treene

Government
  - Mayor: Maren Fürst

Area
  - Total: 16.33 km^{2} (6.31 sq mi)
- Elevation: 4 m (13 ft)

Population (2025-12-31)
  - Total: 675
  - Density: 41.3/km^{2} (107/sq mi)
- Time zone: UTC+01:00 (CET)
  - Summer (DST): UTC+02:00 (CEST)
- Postal codes: 25878, 25840
- Dialling codes: 04881, 04883
- Vehicle registration: NF

Drage (German pronunciation: [ˈdʁaːɡə]) is a municipality in the district of Nordfriesland, in Schleswig-Holstein, Germany.
