= Oldersbek =

Oldersbek Oldersbæk
- Municipality
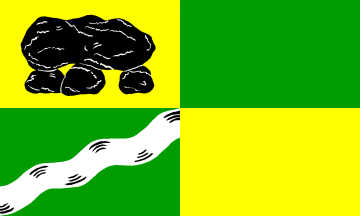
- Flag Coat of arms

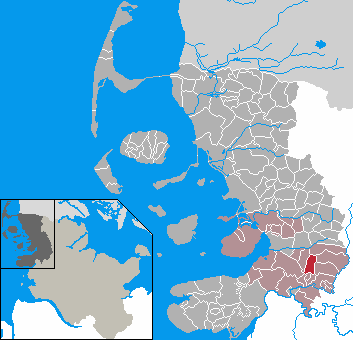
- Location of Oldersbek; Oldersbæk within Nordfriesland district
- Interactive map of Oldersbek; Oldersbæk
- Location within Germany Location within Schleswig-Holstein
- Coordinates: 54°27′N 9°10′E
- Country: Germany
- State: Schleswig-Holstein
- District: Nordfriesland
- Municipal assoc.: Nordsee-Treene

Government
  - Mayor: Karl-Heinz Harder

Area
  - Total: 10.82 km^{2} (4.18 sq mi)
- Elevation: 11 m (36 ft)

Population (2025-12-31)
  - Total: 773
  - Density: 71.4/km^{2} (185/sq mi)
- Time zone: UTC+01:00 (CET)
  - Summer (DST): UTC+02:00 (CEST)
- Postal codes: 25873
- Dialling codes: 04848
- Vehicle registration: NF

Oldersbek (Danish: Oldersbæk) is a municipality in the district of Nordfriesland, in Schleswig-Holstein, Germany.
