= Südermarsch =

Südermarsch Sønder Marsk
- Municipality
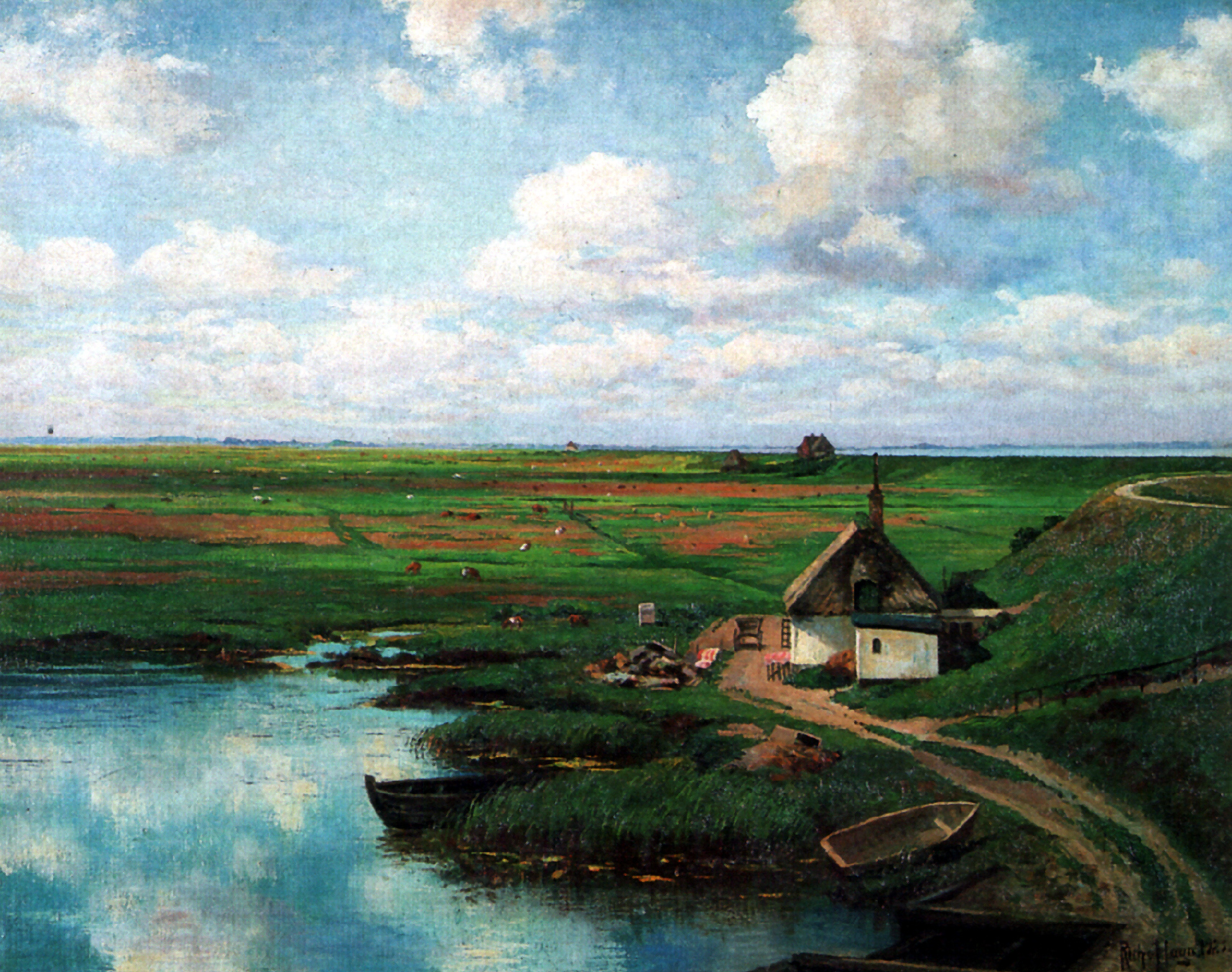
- A pond in Südermarsch as painted by Richard von Hagn in 1923

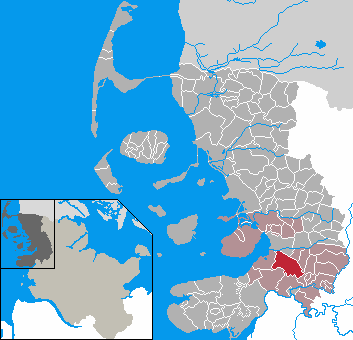
- Location of Südermarsch; Sønder Marsk within Nordfriesland district
- Interactive map of Südermarsch; Sønder Marsk
- Location within Germany Location within Schleswig-Holstein
- Coordinates: 54°25′N 9°4′E
- Country: Germany
- State: Schleswig-Holstein
- District: Nordfriesland
- Municipal assoc.: Nordsee-Treene

Government
  - Mayor: Karl-Jochen Maas

Area
  - Total: 30.66 km^{2} (11.84 sq mi)
- Elevation: 0 m (0 ft)

Population (2025-12-31)
  - Total: 155
  - Density: 5.06/km^{2} (13.1/sq mi)
- Time zone: UTC+01:00 (CET)
  - Summer (DST): UTC+02:00 (CEST)
- Postal codes: 25813
- Dialling codes: 04841
- Vehicle registration: NF

Südermarsch (Danish: Sønder Marsk) is a municipality in the district of Nordfriesland, in Schleswig-Holstein, Germany.
