= Simonsberg, Germany =

Simonsberg
- Municipality
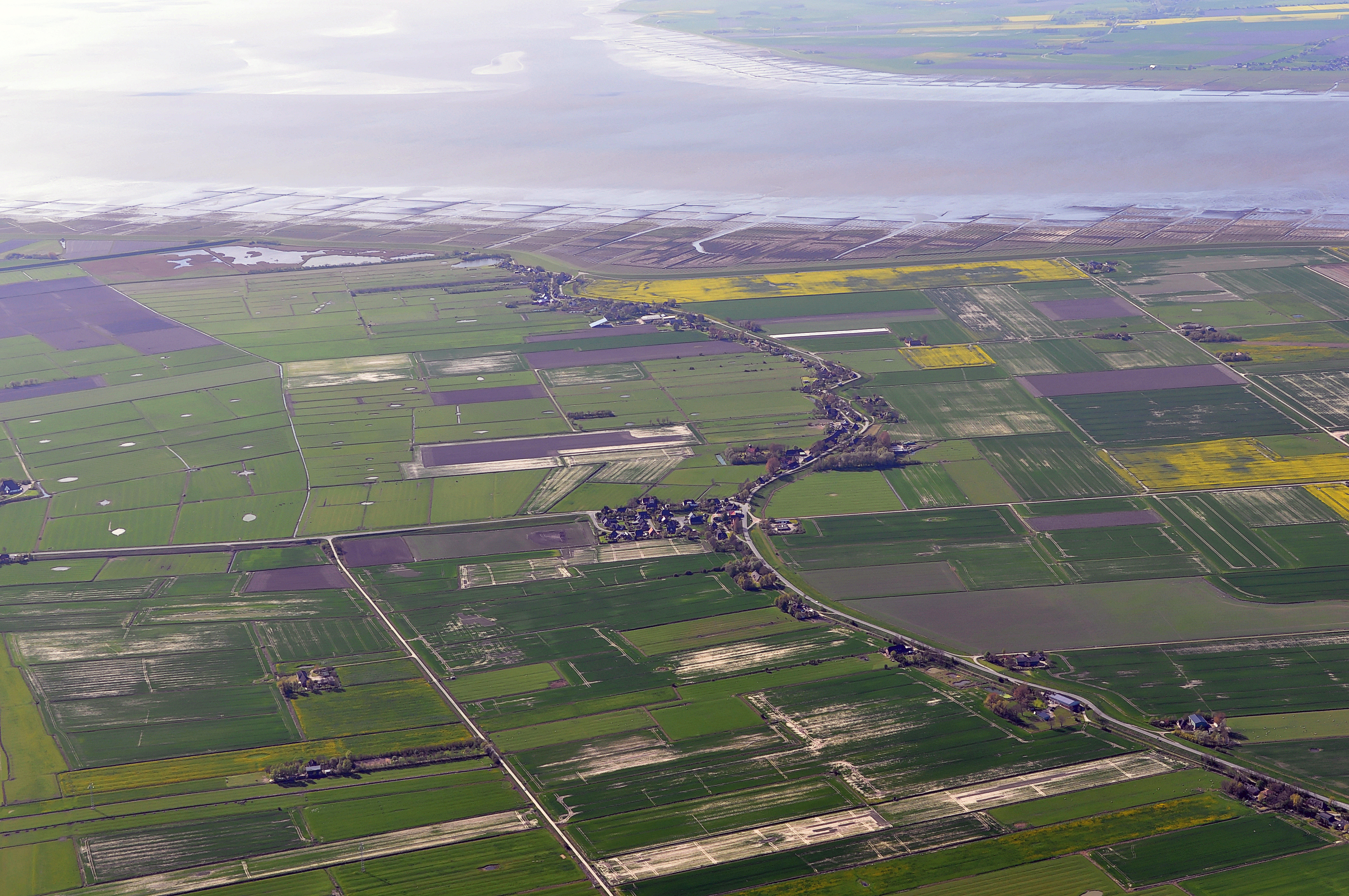
- Aerial view

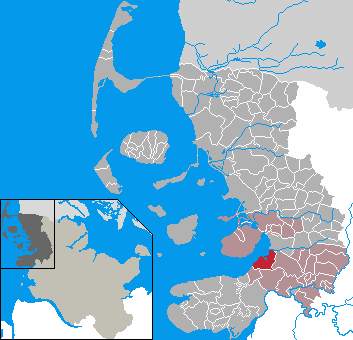
- Location of Simonsberg within Nordfriesland district
- Interactive map of Simonsberg
- Location within Germany Location within Schleswig-Holstein
- Coordinates: 54°26′6″N 8°58′42″E
- Country: Germany
- State: Schleswig-Holstein
- District: Nordfriesland
- Municipal assoc.: Nordsee-Treene

Government
  - Mayor: Erwin Kröger

Area
  - Total: 17.09 km^{2} (6.60 sq mi)
- Elevation: 5 m (16 ft)

Population (2025-12-31)
  - Total: 815
  - Density: 47.7/km^{2} (124/sq mi)
- Time zone: UTC+01:00 (CET)
  - Summer (DST): UTC+02:00 (CEST)
- Postal codes: 25813
- Dialling codes: 04841
- Vehicle registration: NF

Simonsberg is a municipality in the district of Nordfriesland, in Schleswig-Holstein, Germany.
