= Mildstedt =

Mildstedt Mildsted
- Municipality
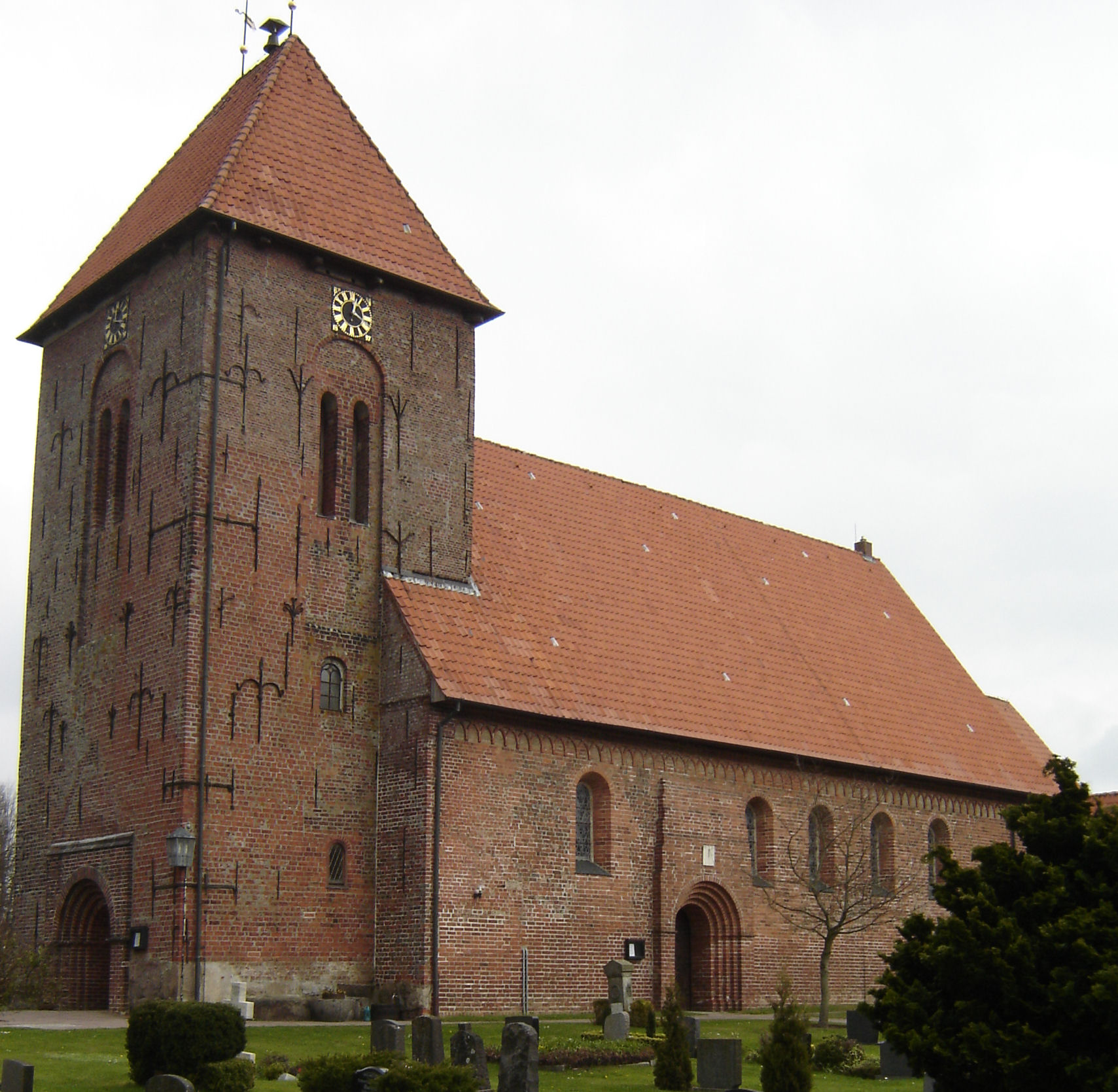
- St. Lambert church

- Coat of arms

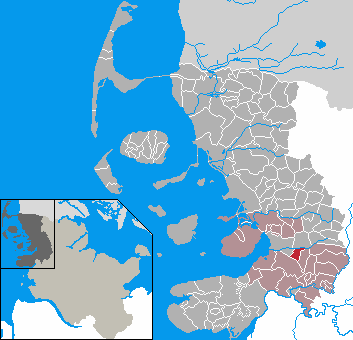
- Location of Mildstedt; Mildsted within Nordfriesland district
- Interactive map of Mildstedt; Mildsted
- Location within Germany Location within Schleswig-Holstein
- Coordinates: 54°27′55″N 9°5′44″E
- Country: Germany
- State: Schleswig-Holstein
- District: Nordfriesland
- Municipal assoc.: Nordsee-Treene

Government
  - Mayor: Bernd Heiber (SPD)

Area
  - Total: 8.71 km^{2} (3.36 sq mi)
- Elevation: 9 m (30 ft)

Population (2025-12-31)
  - Total: 3,981
  - Density: 457/km^{2} (1,180/sq mi)
- Time zone: UTC+01:00 (CET)
  - Summer (DST): UTC+02:00 (CEST)
- Postal codes: 25866
- Dialling codes: 04841
- Vehicle registration: NF

Mildstedt (Danish: Mildsted) is a municipality in the district of Nordfriesland, in Schleswig-Holstein, Germany.
