= Hattstedtermarsch =

Hattstedtermarsch Hatsted Marsk / Haatstinger Määrsch
- Municipality
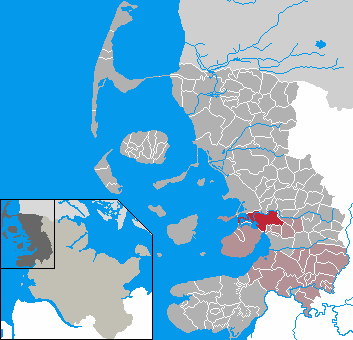
- Location of Hattstedtermarsch; Hatsted Marsk / Haatstinger Määrsch within Nordfriesland district
- Interactive map of Hattstedtermarsch; Hatsted Marsk / Haatstinger Määrsch
- Location within Germany Location within Schleswig-Holstein
- Coordinates: 54°33′13″N 9°0′17″E
- Country: Germany
- State: Schleswig-Holstein
- District: Nordfriesland
- Municipal assoc.: Nordsee-Treene

Government
  - Mayor: Solvei Domeyer

Area
  - Total: 35.26 km^{2} (13.61 sq mi)
- Elevation: 2 m (6.6 ft)

Population (2025-12-31)
  - Total: 273
  - Density: 7.74/km^{2} (20.1/sq mi)
- Time zone: UTC+01:00 (CET)
  - Summer (DST): UTC+02:00 (CEST)
- Postal codes: 25856
- Dialling codes: 04846
- Vehicle registration: NF
- Website: www.amt-hattstedt.de

Hattstedtermarsch (Danish: Hatsted Marsk, North Frisian: Haatstinger Määrsch) is a municipality in the district of Nordfriesland, in Schleswig-Holstein, Germany.
