= Hattstedt =

Hattstedt Hatsted / Haatst
- Municipality
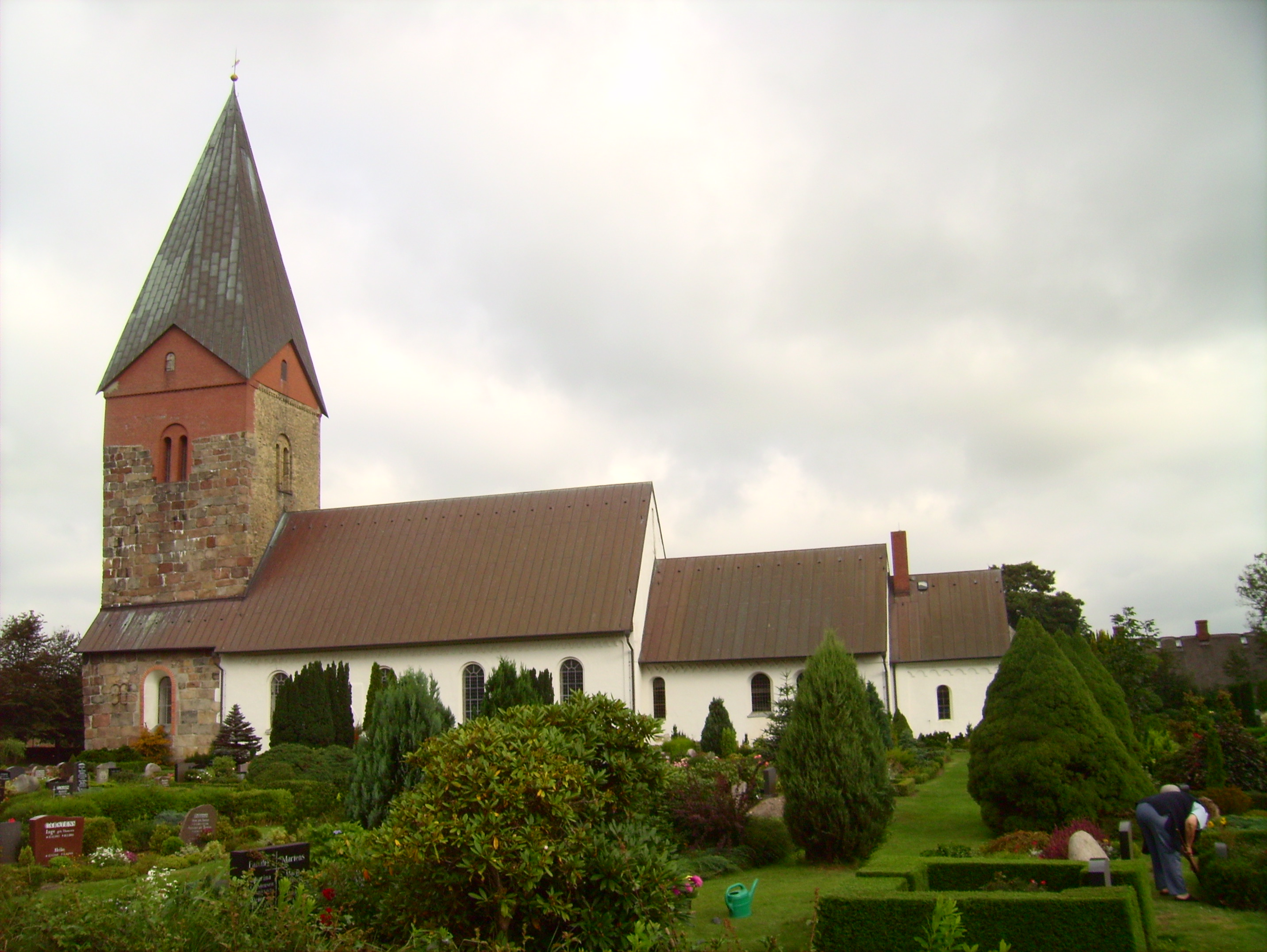
- St. Mary's church

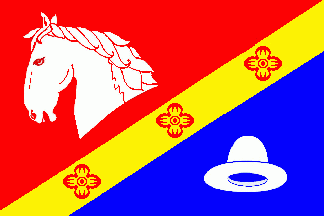
- Flag Coat of arms

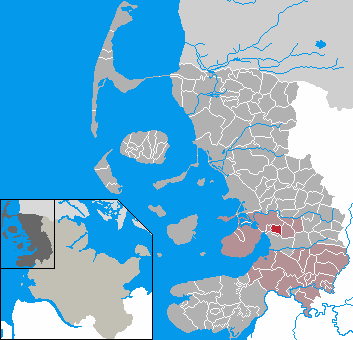
- Location of Hattstedt; Hatsted / Haatst within Nordfriesland district
- Interactive map of Hattstedt; Hatsted / Haatst
- Location within Germany Location within Schleswig-Holstein
- Coordinates: 54°31′N 9°1′E
- Country: Germany
- State: Schleswig-Holstein
- District: Nordfriesland
- Municipal assoc.: Nordsee-Treene

Government
  - Mayor: Ralf Jacobsen (CDU)

Area
  - Total: 7 km^{2} (2.7 sq mi)
- Elevation: 4 m (13 ft)

Population (2025-12-31)
  - Total: 2,646
  - Density: 380/km^{2} (980/sq mi)
- Time zone: UTC+01:00 (CET)
  - Summer (DST): UTC+02:00 (CEST)
- Postal codes: 25856
- Dialling codes: 04846
- Vehicle registration: NF
- Website: www.amt-hattstedt.de

Hattstedt (Danish: Hatsted, North Frisian: Haatst) is a municipality in the district of Nordfriesland, in Schleswig-Holstein, Germany. It is situated near the North Sea coast, approx. 6 km northwest of Husum. Located on the edge of the village is the Mikkelberg-Kunst-und-Cricket Center, a cricket ground which has in the past held neutral Women's One Day Internationals between Denmark Women and the Netherlands Women.

Hattstedt is part of the Amt ("collective municipality") Nordsee-Treene. Hattstedt was the home of the last two speakers of Southern Goesharde Frisian until it became extinct with their deaths in 1980 and 1981.
