= Hude, Schleswig-Holstein =

Hude
- Municipality
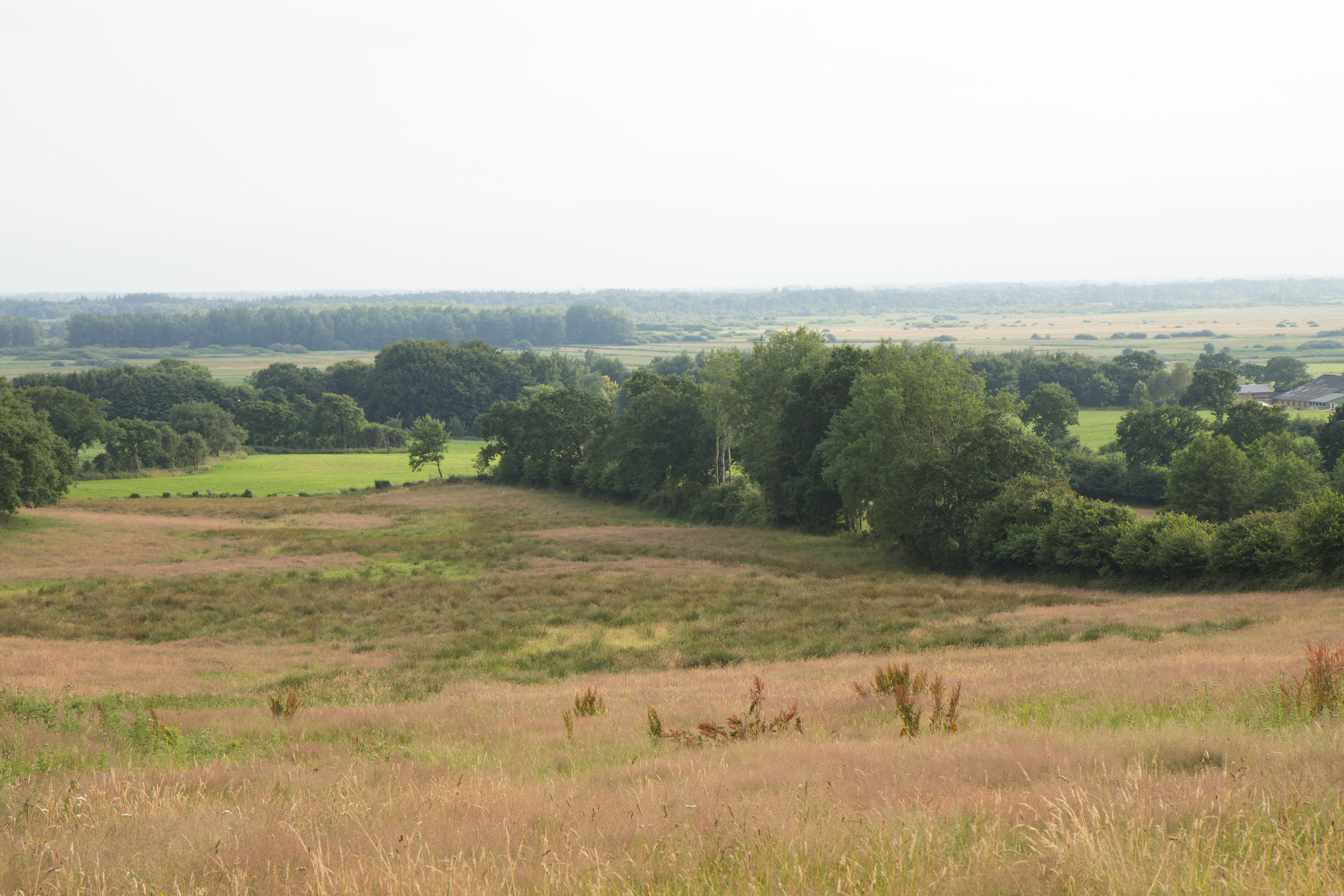
- Farmland near Hude

- Coat of arms

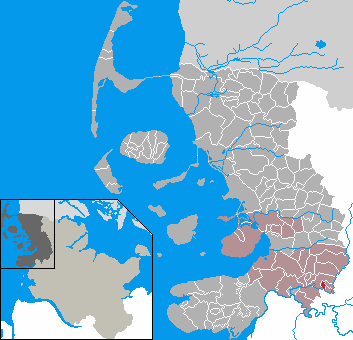
- Location of Hude within Nordfriesland district
- Interactive map of Hude
- Location within Germany Location within Schleswig-Holstein
- Coordinates: 54°22′N 9°13′E
- Country: Germany
- State: Schleswig-Holstein
- District: Nordfriesland
- Municipal assoc.: Nordsee-Treene

Government
  - Mayor: Jess Hagge

Area
  - Total: 3.54 km^{2} (1.37 sq mi)
- Elevation: 7 m (23 ft)

Population (2025-12-31)
  - Total: 175
  - Density: 49.4/km^{2} (128/sq mi)
- Time zone: UTC+01:00 (CET)
  - Summer (DST): UTC+02:00 (CEST)
- Postal codes: 25876
- Dialling codes: 04884
- Vehicle registration: NF

Hude (German pronunciation: [ˈhuːdə]) is a municipality in the district of Nordfriesland, in Schleswig-Holstein, Germany.
