= Horstedt, Schleswig-Holstein =

Horstedt Horsted / Hoorst
- Municipality
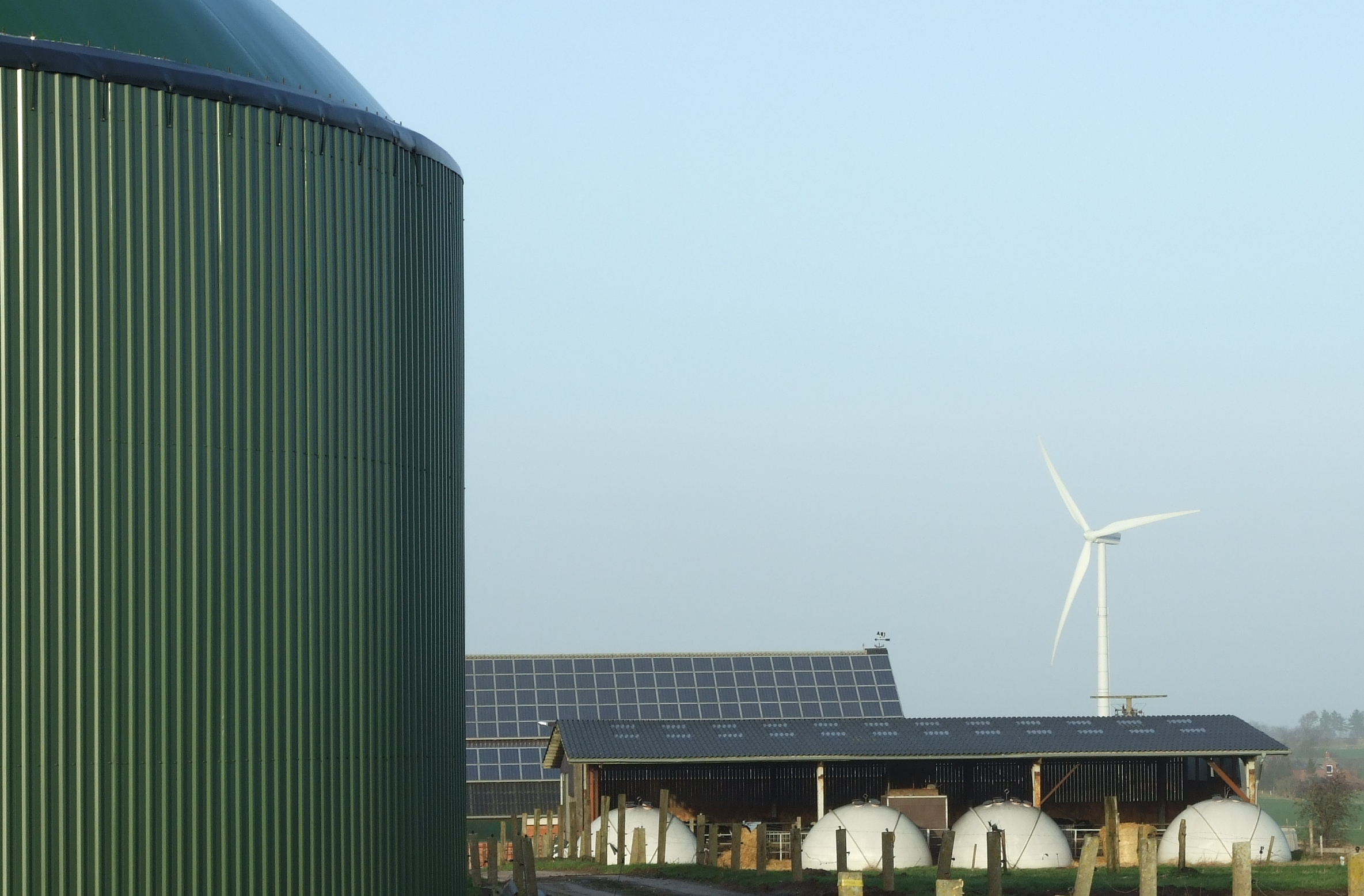
- Renewable energies: Biogas fermenter, wind power and photovoltaics on a farm in Horstedt

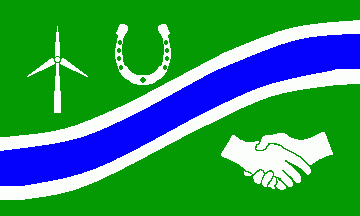
- Flag Coat of arms

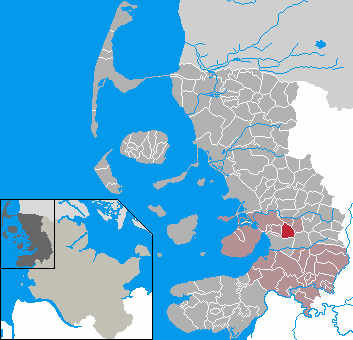
- Location of Horstedt; Horsted / Hoorst within Nordfriesland district
- Interactive map of Horstedt; Horsted / Hoorst
- Location within Germany Location within Schleswig-Holstein
- Coordinates: 54°31′N 9°4′E
- Country: Germany
- State: Schleswig-Holstein
- District: Nordfriesland
- Municipal assoc.: Nordsee-Treene

Government
  - Mayor: Karen Hansen

Area
  - Total: 11.7 km^{2} (4.5 sq mi)
- Elevation: 9 m (30 ft)

Population (2025-12-31)
  - Total: 762
  - Density: 65.1/km^{2} (169/sq mi)
- Time zone: UTC+01:00 (CET)
  - Summer (DST): UTC+02:00 (CEST)
- Postal codes: 25860
- Dialling codes: 04846
- Vehicle registration: NF
- Website: www.amt-hattstedt.de

Horstedt (German pronunciation: [ˈhɔʁʃtɛt]; Danish: Horsted; North Frisian: Hoorst) is a municipality in the district of Nordfriesland, in Schleswig-Holstein, Germany.
