= Nordfriesland (district) =

Coordinates: 54°35′N 9°00′E

- District
- Flag Coat of arms

- Country: Germany
- State: Schleswig-Holstein
- Capital: Husum

Government
  - District admin.: Florian Lorenzen (CDU)

Area
  - Total: 2,047 km^{2} (790 sq mi)

Population (31 December 2024)
  - Total: 170,029
  - Density: 83.06/km^{2} (215.1/sq mi)
- Time zone: UTC+01:00 (CET)
  - Summer (DST): UTC+02:00 (CEST)
- Vehicle registration: NF
- Website: nordfriesland.de

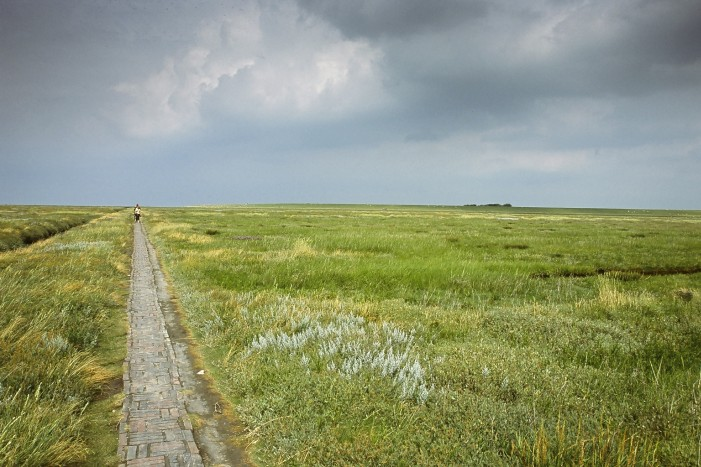
Marshland in Eiderstedt, typical of the North Frisian coast

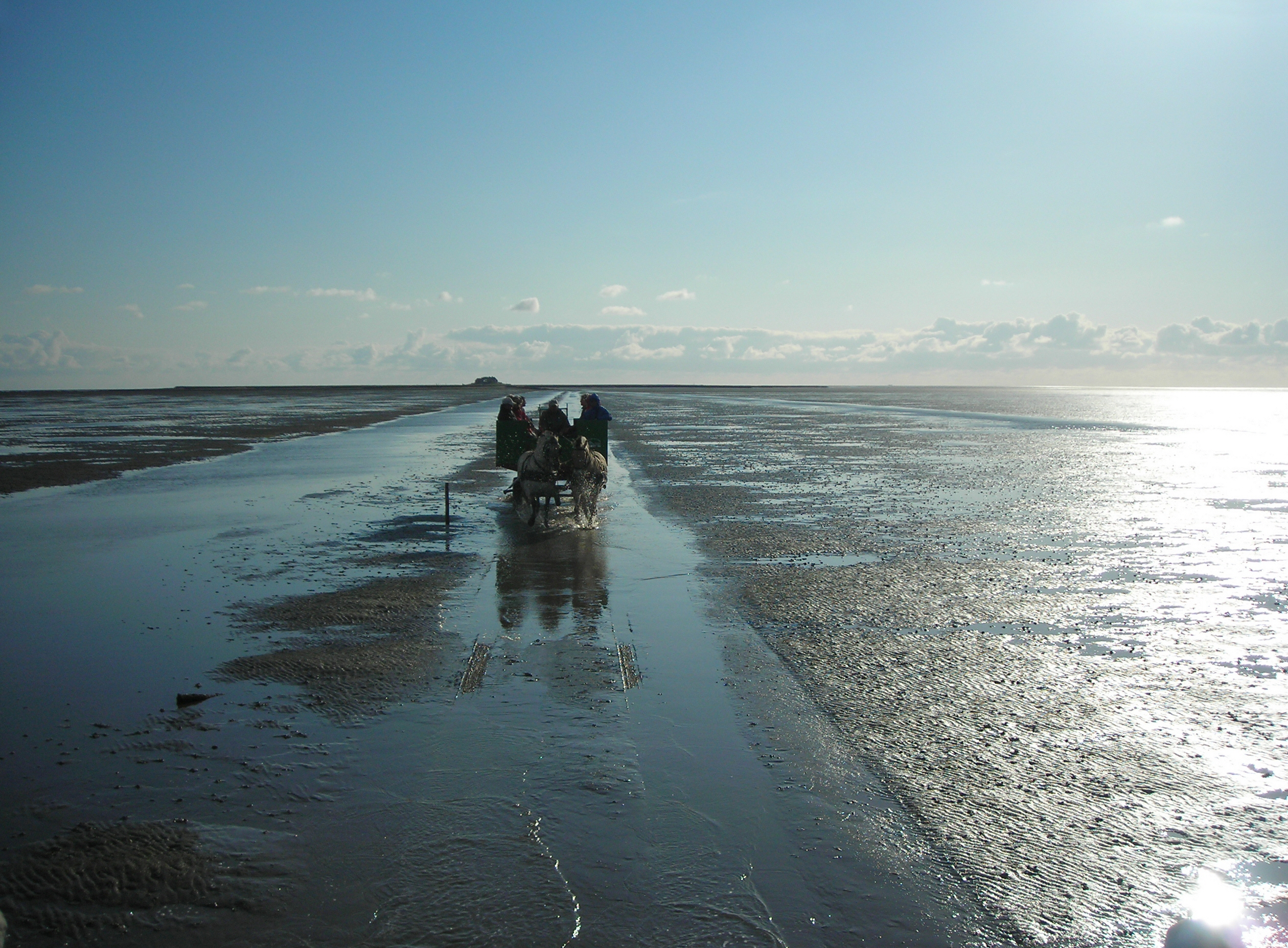
Horsecart coming from a Hallig island in the mudflat at low tide

Nordfriesland (German pronunciation: [nɔʁtˈfʁiːslant]; Danish: Nordfrisland; North Frisian: Nordfraschlönj [nɔʀdˈfʀaʃlœɲ] Low German: Noordfreesland), also known as North Frisia, is the northernmost district of Germany, part of the state of Schleswig-Holstein. It includes almost all of traditional North Frisia (with the exception of the island of Heligoland), as well as adjacent parts of the Schleswig Geest to the east and Stapelholm to the south, and is bounded (from the east and clockwise) by the districts of Schleswig-Flensburg and Dithmarschen, the North Sea and the Danish county of South Jutland. The district is called Kreis Nordfriesland in German, Kreis Noordfreesland in Low German, Kris Nordfraschlönj in Mooring North Frisian, Kreis Nuurdfresklun in Fering North Frisian and Nordfrislands amt in Danish.

As of 2008, Nordfriesland was the most visited rural district in Germany.

== History ==
The sea has always had a strong influence in the region. In medieval times, storm tides made life in what is now Nordfriesland rather dangerous. Only in modern times was the loss of land and lives able to be stopped by building solid dikes. Many villages that once existed are now at the bottom of the sea. The best-known example is the small seaport of Rungholt, which was destroyed by a storm surge in 1362. The island of Strand vanished in the Burchardi flood, another disastrous storm in 1634. Subsequent to this storm surge, there were many small islets instead of Strand.

From approximately 1200 until 1864, the area that is now Nordfriesland was a part of the Duchy of Schleswig, which itself was not directly a part of the Danish Kingdom, but a fiefdom of the Danish crown and linked to the kings of Denmark by personal union as a separate entity. Nordfriesland is still a multilingual district: there are people speaking standard German, Low German, North Frisian and Danish including South Jutlandic. The North Frisian language exists in nine slightly different dialects, yet it is mainly used by older citizens in mainland Nordfriesland. A relatively lively community of Frisian speakers exists though on the islands of Föhr and Amrum. After becoming German, three districts were established in the region: Südtondern in the north, Husum in the centre, and Eiderstedt in the south. In 1970 these three districts were merged to form the Nordfriesland district.

== Geography ==
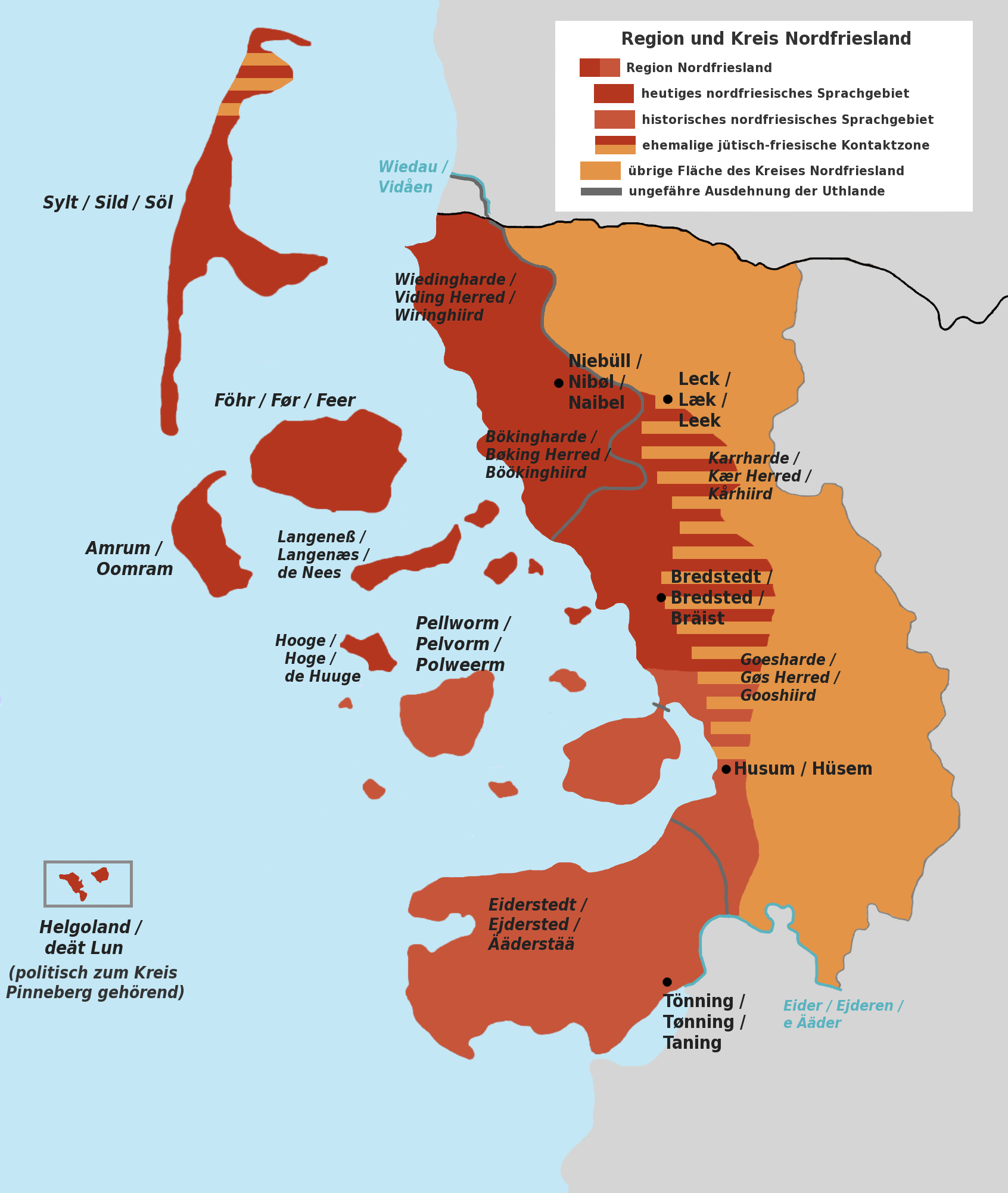
North Frisia within the modern Nordfriesland district

The entire coastal region is part of the Schleswig-Holstein Wadden Sea National Park. Nordfriesland includes the coastal section between Dithmarschen and Denmark. In the south is the Eiderstedt peninsula, where the River Eider meets the sea.

The North Frisian Islands are also part of the Nordfriesland district and located inside the national park as well. There are five large islands (Sylt, Föhr, Amrum, Pellworm and Nordstrand) and ten smaller islets known as Halligen.

== Coat of arms ==

The coat of arms displays three golden ships on a blue background. These coats of arms have been used by the Eiderstedt peninsula since the 17th century. When the district was established in 1970, the arms of Eiderstedt were applied to the entire district. Differing from the old arms, though, there are three images visible on the ships' sails: a plow, a herring and a bull's head.

== Towns and municipalities ==
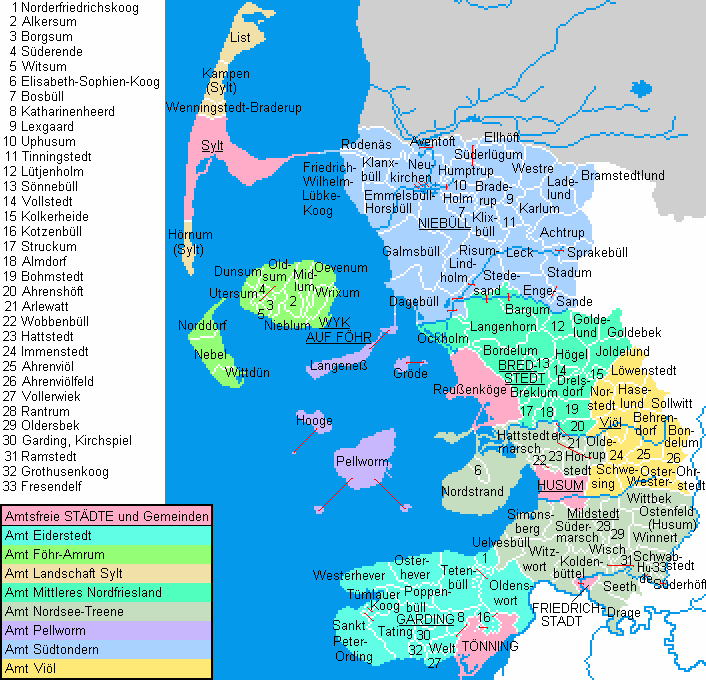

Independent towns and municipalities
1. Friedrichstadt
2. Husum
3. Tönning
4. Reußenköge

Ämter
1. Eiderstedt; 1. Garding^{1, 2}; 2. Garding, Kirchspiel; 3. Grothusenkoog; 4. Katharinenheerd; 5. Kotzenbüll; 6. Norderfriedrichskoog; 7. Oldenswort; 8. Osterhever; 9. Poppenbüll; 10. Sankt Peter-Ording; 11. Tating; 12. Tetenbüll; 13. Tümlauer-Koog; 14. Vollerwiek; 15. Welt; 16. Westerhever; 2. Föhr-Amrum; 1. Alkersum; 2. Borgsum; 3. Dunsum; 4. Midlum; 5. Nebel; 6. Nieblum; 7. Norddorf; 8. Oevenum; 9. Oldsum; 10. Süderende; 11. Utersum; 12. Witsum; 13. Wittdün; 14. Wrixum; 15. Wyk auf Föhr^{1, 2}; 3. Landschaft Sylt; 1. Hörnum; 2. Kampen; 3. List; 4. Sylt^{1}; 5. Wenningstedt-Braderup	4. Mittleres Nordfriesland; 1. Ahrenshöft; 2. Almdorf; 3. Bargum; 4. Bohmstedt; 5. Bordelum; 6. Bredstedt^{1, 2}; 7. Breklum; 8. Drelsdorf; 9. Goldebek; 10. Goldelund; 11. Högel; 12. Joldelund; 13. Kolkerheide; 14. Langenhorn; 15. Lütjenholm; 16. Ockholm; 17. Sönnebüll; 18. Struckum; 19. Vollstedt; 5. Nordsee-Treene; 1. Arlewatt; 2. Drage; 3. Elisabeth-Sophien-Koog; 4. Fresendelf; 5. Hattstedt; 6. Hattstedtermarsch; 7. Horstedt; 8. Hude; 9. Koldenbüttel; 10. Mildstedt^{1}; 11. Nordstrand; 12. Oldersbek; 13. Olderup; 14. Ostenfeld; 15. Ramstedt; 16. Rantrum; 17. Schwabstedt; 18. Seeth; 19. Simonsberg; 20. Süderhöft; 21. Südermarsch; 22. Uelvesbüll; 23. Winnert; 24. Wisch; 25. Wittbek; 26. Witzwort; 27. Wobbenbüll	6. Pellworm; 1. Gröde; 2. Hooge; 3. Langeneß; 4. Pellworm^{1}; 7. Südtondern; 1. Achtrup; 2. Aventoft; 3. Bosbüll; 4. Braderup; 5. Bramstedtlund; 6. Dagebüll; 7. Ellhöft; 8. Emmelsbüll-Horsbüll; 9. Enge-Sande; 10. Friedrich-Wilhelm-Lübke-Koog; 11. Galmsbüll; 12. Holm; 13. Humptrup; 14. Karlum; 15. Klanxbüll; 16. Klixbüll; 17. Ladelund; 18. Leck; 19. Lexgaard; 20. Neukirchen; 21. Niebüll^{1, 2}; 22. Risum-Lindholm; 23. Rodenäs; 24. Sprakebüll; 25. Stadum; 26. Stedesand; 27. Süderlügum; 28. Tinningstedt; 29. Uphusum; 30. Westre; 8. Viöl; 1. Ahrenviöl; 2. Ahrenviölfeld; 3. Behrendorf; 4. Bondelum; 5. Haselund; 6. Immenstedt; 7. Löwenstedt; 8. Norstedt; 9. Oster-Ohrstedt; 10. Schwesing; 11. Sollwitt; 12. Viöl^{1}; 13. Wester-Ohrstedt
^{1}seat of the Amt; ^{2}town

== See also ==
- Biikebrennen
