= Eiderstedt (Amt) =

- Amt
- Flag Coat of arms

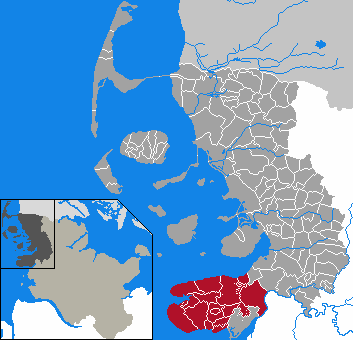
- Map of Nordfriesland highlighting Eiderstedt
- Interactive map of Eiderstedt
- Location within Germany Location within Schleswig-Holstein
- Coordinates: 54°20′N 8°47′E
- Country: Germany
- State: Schleswig-Holstein
- District: Nordfriesland
- Seat: Garding
- Subdivisions: 16 municipalities

Government
  - Mayor: Christian Marwig

Area
  - Total: 249.17 km^{2} (96.21 sq mi)

Population (2025-12-31)
  - Total: 11,190
  - Density: 44.91/km^{2} (116.3/sq mi)
- Time zone: UTC+01:00 (CET)
  - Summer (DST): UTC+02:00 (CEST)
- Website: amt-eiderstedt.de

Eiderstedt (German: Eiderstedt; Danish: Ejdersted; North Frisian: Ääderstää) is an Amt ("collective municipality") in the district of Nordfriesland, in Schleswig-Holstein, Germany. The Amt covers the peninsula of Eiderstedt, excepted for the town of Tönning.

== History ==
On January 1, 2008, the independent municipality of Sankt Peter-Ording became part of the Amt.

== Subdivision ==
The Amt Eiderstedt consists of the following municipalities:

1. Garding [town]
2. Grothusenkoog
3. Katharinenheerd
4. Kirchspiel Garding
5. Kotzenbüll
6. Norderfriedrichskoog
7. Oldenswort
8. Osterhever
9. Poppenbüll
10. Sankt Peter-Ording
11. Tating
12. Tetenbüll
13. Tümlauer-Koog
14. Vollerwiek
15. Welt
16. Westerhever

== Coat of arms ==
The coat of arms displays a golden ship on a blue background with 3 sails in which are drawn, in red, a leopard, a cow and a fish.
