= Bad St Peter-Ording station =

Train station in Schleswig-Holstein, Germany

Bad St Peter-Ording
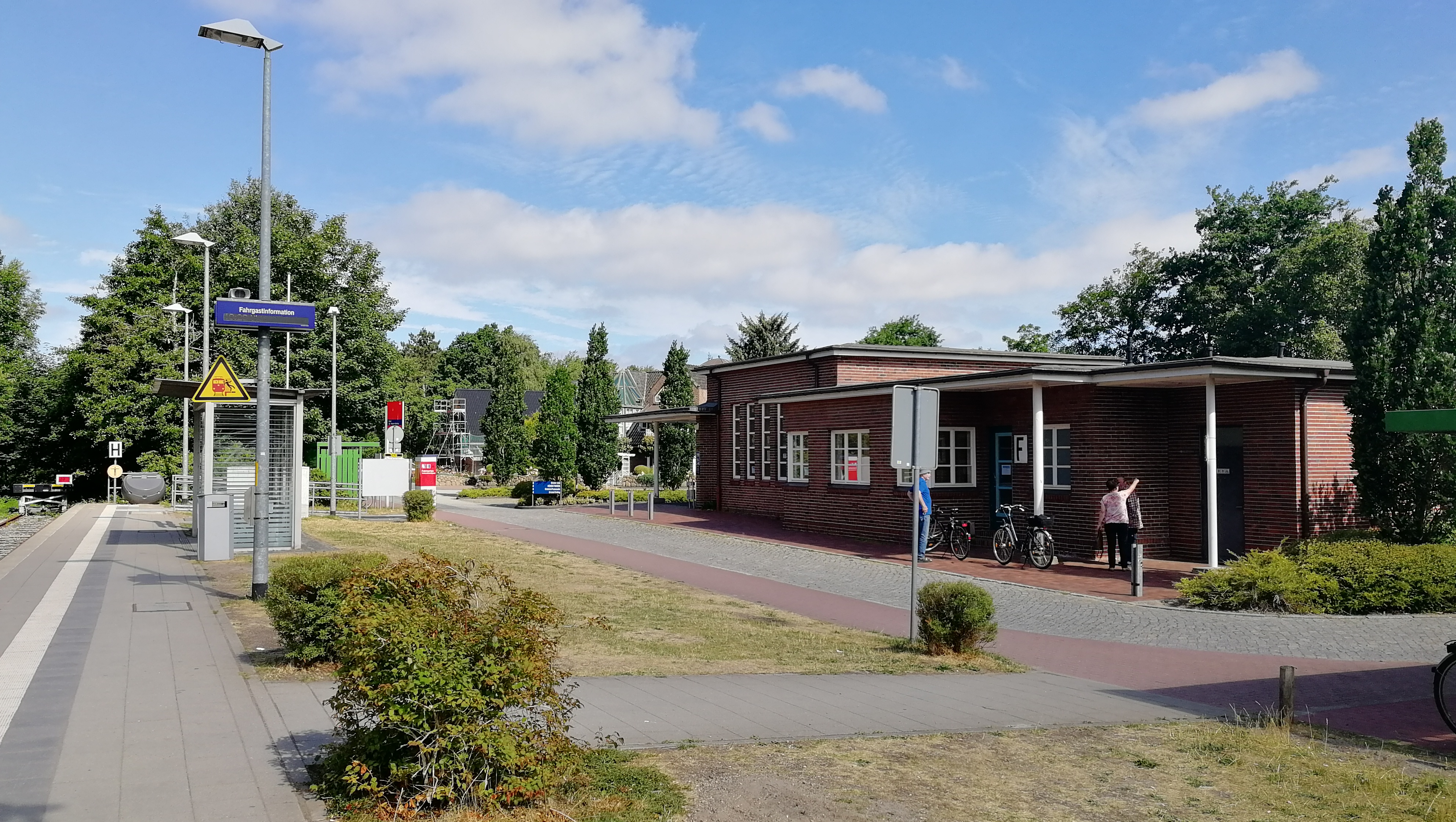
- 2018

General information
- Location: Am Kurpark 4; 25826 Sankt Peter-Ording; Schleswig-Holstein; Germany
- Coordinates: 54.3176°N 8.6147°E
- System: Hp
- Owner: Deutsche Bahn
- Operator: DB Netz; DB Station&Service
- Lines: Husum–Bad St. Peter-Ording railway (KBS 135)
- Platforms: 1 side platform
- Tracks: 1
- Train operators: nordbahn
- Connections: RB 64; 1 (summer season) 2 (summer season) 3 (summer season) 1071 1082 (winter season) 1084 (winter season)

Construction
- Parking: yes
- Cycle facilities: yes
- Accessible: yes

Other information
- Station code: 350
- DS100 code: APO
- IBNR: 8000755
- Category: 6
- Fare zone: NAH.SH
- Website: www.bahnhof.de

History
- Opened: 24 July 1932; 94 years ago

Services
Preceding station		Following station
Terminus	RB 64	Bad St Peter Süd towards Husum
Location
- Location within Schleswig-Holstein Location within Germany Location within Europe

Bad St Peter-Ording station (German: Haltepunkt Bad St Peter-Ording) is a railway station in the municipality of Sankt Peter-Ording, located in the Nordfriesland district in Schleswig-Holstein, Germany.
