= Johannes Nikolaus Tetens =

German-Danish philosopher and scientist (1736–1807)

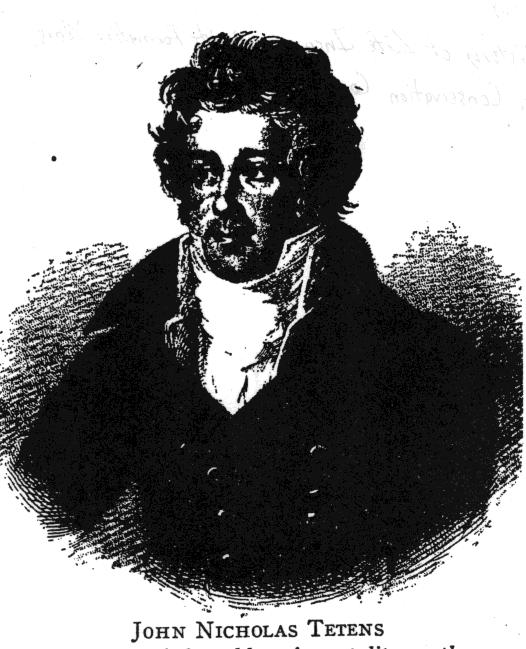
- Born: 16 September 1736; Tetenbüll, Duchy of Schleswig, Denmark–Norway (in present-day Eiderstedt, Nordfriesland, Schleswig-Holstein, Germany)
- Died: 17 August 1807 (aged 70); Copenhagen, Denmark–Norway

Education
- Education: University of Rostock; University of Copenhagen

Philosophical work
- Era: 18th-century philosophy
- Region: Western philosophy
- School: Phenomenalism
- Institutions: University of Bützow; University of Kiel
- Main interests: Natural philosophy Mathematics; Epistemology; Theology
- Notable ideas: Psychological analysis of the soul

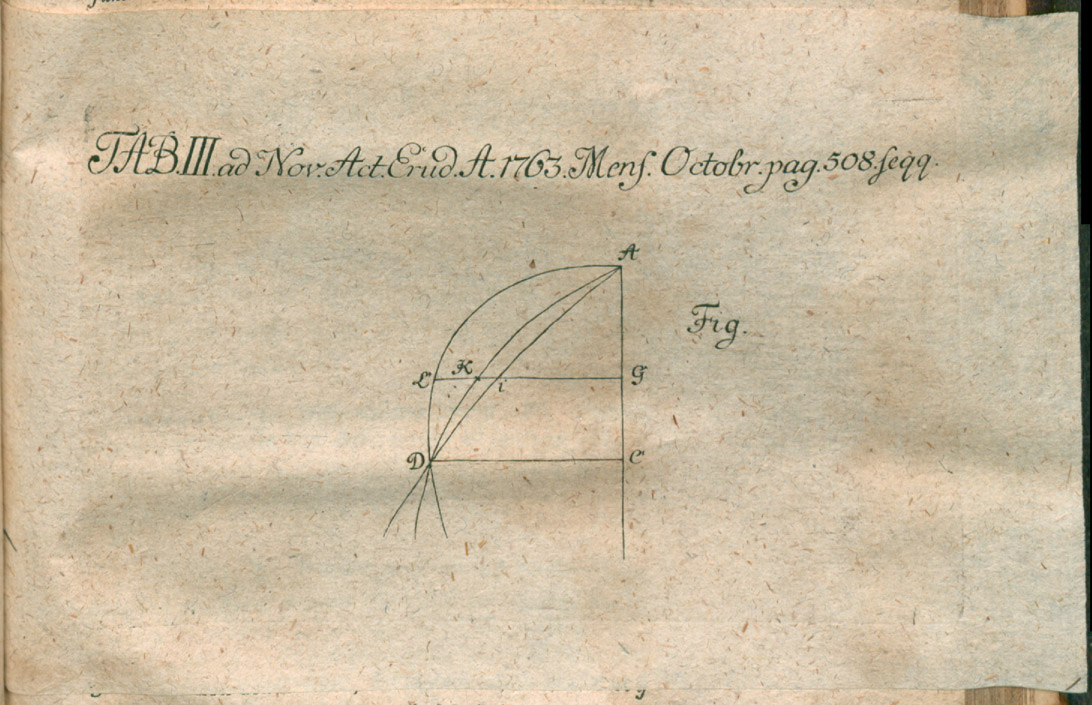
Illustration from Methodus inveniendi curvas...published on Acta Eruditorum, 1763

Johannes Nikolaus Tetens (also Johann; Danish: Johan Nicolai Tetens; 16 September 1736 – 17 August 1807) was a German-Danish philosopher, statistician and scientist.

He has been called the "German Locke," on the basis of a comparison of his major work Philosophische Versuche über die menschliche Natur und ihre Entwickelung (1777) with the work of John Locke. He is considered to have been an influence on Immanuel Kant.

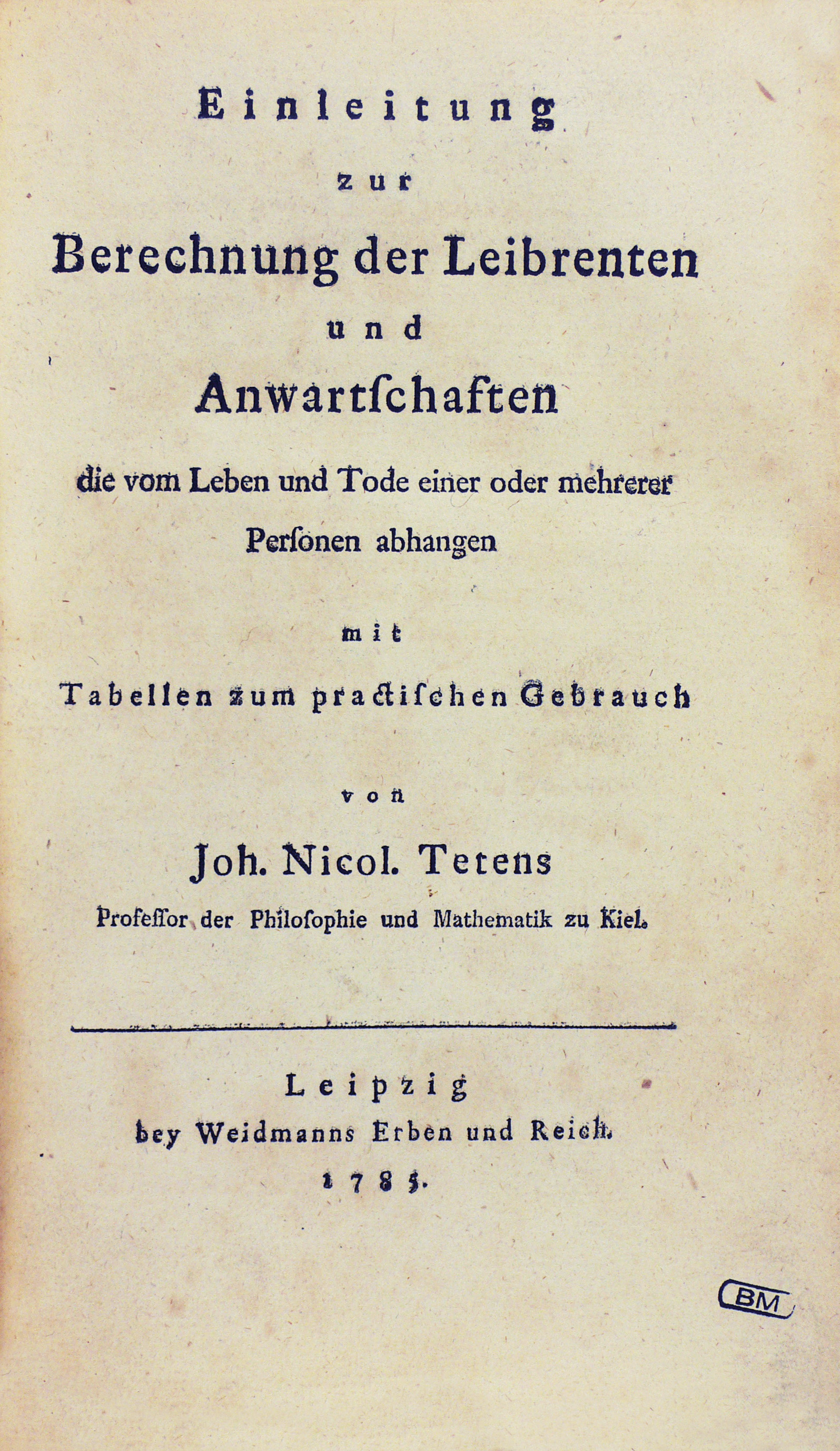
Einleitung zur Berechnung der Leibrenten, 1785

== Biography ==
Tetens was born 1736 in Tetenbüll/Tetenbøl in the Danish Duchy of Schleswig. He studied mathematics and physics at the University of Rostock and the University of Copenhagen. He acquired an MA in 1759 and his PhD in 1760. From 1760 to 1765, he taught philosophy and physics ("natural philosophy" at that time) at the University of Bützow (in Bützow, Mecklenburg-Western Pomerania). During this decade, he wrote many treatises on various subjects, ranging from the color of the sky to the existence of God through the origins of languages (see e. g. references in Johann Christian Poggendorff, 1863). After this polygraphic formation period, Tetens goes back to more fundamental enquiries: after having read David Hume's work, he popularized it throughout the German-speaking world. Tetens is therefore supposed to have introduced Immanuel Kant to phenomenalistic thought and to the empiricism / transcendence dualism.

In 1776, Tetens became Professor of Philosophy at the University of Kiel. Nonetheless, in the years following 1789, Tetens began another career as a high-ranking Danish civil servant: member of the Finanzcollegium in Copenhagen, then (1791) counselor of state, and (1803) co-director of the state bank and director of the widow pension funds. By this time, he was interested in pure mathematics as well as in applications. His interest in polynomial algebra was influenced by his belonging to the German combinatorial school of Carl Friederich Hindenburg, Christian Kramp and others. His main applied work was concentrated on actuarial mathematics. He taught at Kiel until 1785.

The book Einleitung zur Berechnung der Leibrenten und Anwartschaften, published in Leipzig in 1785 (first part) and 1786 (second part) was a landmark of actuarial science. It contains an extensive synthesis of previous work on the subject, from Halley's mortality table to Richard Price's Observations on reversionary payments. It is recognized by actuaries for featuring the first risk measure ever (the Risico der Casse); moreover it offers some insights in mathematical statistics: by using an approximation of the binomial distribution, Tetens tried to compute the confidence level of a given sampling procedure.

== Works ==
- Gedanken von einigen Ursachen, warum in der Metaphysik nur wenige ausgemachte Wahrheiten sind (1760)
- Abhandlungen von den Beweisen des Daseins Gottes (1761)
- Ueber den Ursprung der Sprache und der Schrift (1772)
- Ueber die allgemeine speculativische Philosophie (1775)
- Philosophische Versuche über die menschliche Natur und ihre Entwickelung, Vol. 1 and Vol. 2 (1777)
- Einleitung zur Berechnung der Leibrenten und Anwartschaften die vom Leben oder Tode einer oder mehrerer Personen abhangen mit Tabellen zum praktischen Gebrauch, Vol. 1 (1785) and Vol. 2 (1786)
- Reisen in die Marschländer der Nordsee (1788)
- Sprachphilosophische Versuche (posthum, 1971)
