= Kirchspiel Garding =

- Municipality
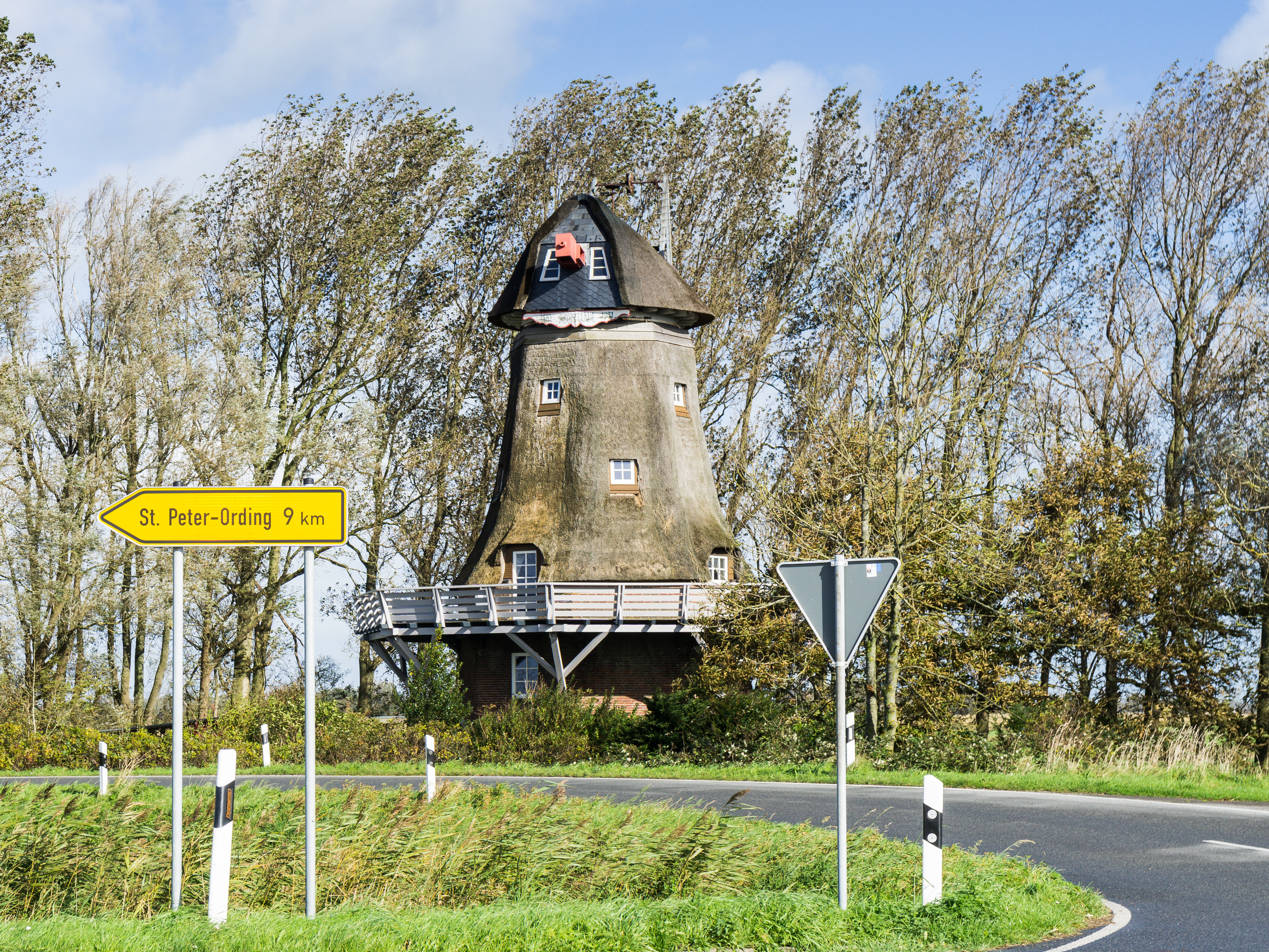

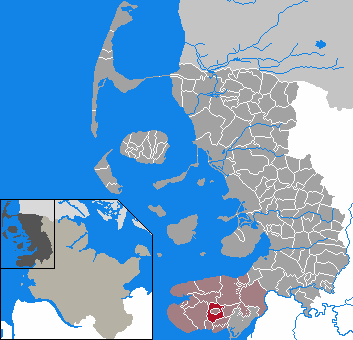
- Location of Kirchspiel Garding within Nordfriesland district
- Interactive map of Kirchspiel Garding
- Location within Germany Location within Schleswig-Holstein
- Coordinates: 54°19′N 8°47′E
- Country: Germany
- State: Schleswig-Holstein
- District: Nordfriesland

Government
  - Mayor: Richard Merkner

Area
  - Total: 14.89 km^{2} (5.75 sq mi)
- Elevation: 0 m (0 ft)

Population (2025-12-31)
  - Total: 272
  - Density: 18.3/km^{2} (47.3/sq mi)
- Time zone: UTC+01:00 (CET)
  - Summer (DST): UTC+02:00 (CEST)
- Postal codes: 25836
- Dialling codes: 04862
- Vehicle registration: NF
- Website: www.amt-eiderstedt. kommunen. nordfriesland. city-map.de

Kirchspiel Garding (German pronunciation: [ˈkɪʁçʃpiːl ˈɡaʁdɪŋ]) is a municipality in the district of Nordfriesland, in Schleswig-Holstein, Germany. It surrounds the town of Garding.

== See also ==
- Eiderstedt peninsula
