= Tetenbüll =

Tetenbüll Tetenbøl
- Municipality
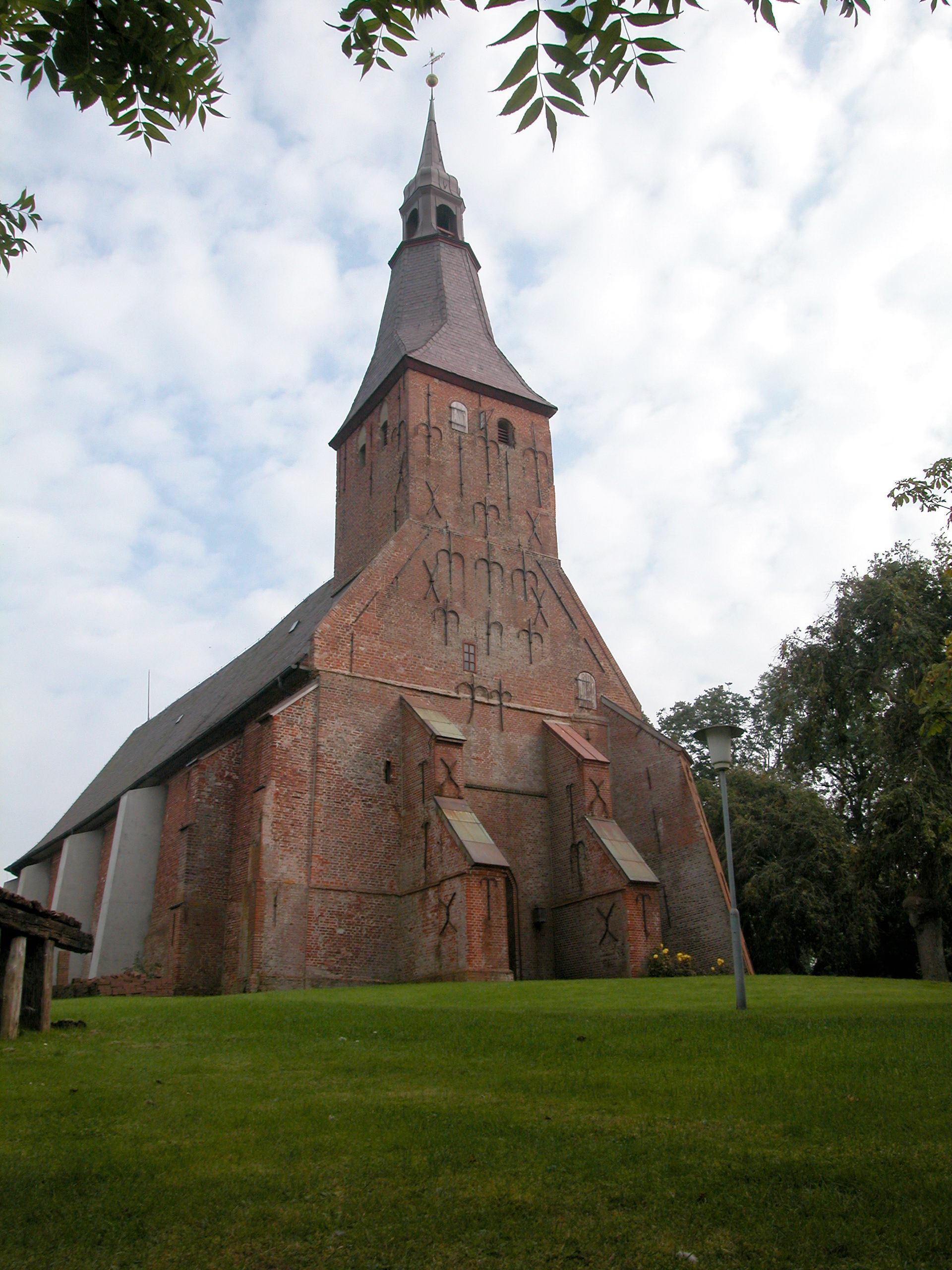
- Saint Anne Church

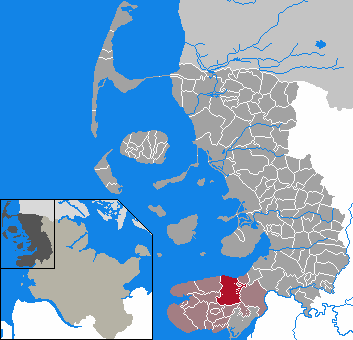
- Location of Tetenbüll; Tetenbøl within Nordfriesland district
- Interactive map of Tetenbüll; Tetenbøl
- Location within Germany Location within Schleswig-Holstein
- Coordinates: 54°21′14″N 8°49′34″E
- Country: Germany
- State: Schleswig-Holstein
- District: Nordfriesland

Government
  - Mayor: Henning Möller

Area
  - Total: 36.48 km^{2} (14.09 sq mi)
- Elevation: 2 m (6.6 ft)

Population (2025-12-31)
  - Total: 560
  - Density: 15/km^{2} (40/sq mi)
- Time zone: UTC+01:00 (CET)
  - Summer (DST): UTC+02:00 (CEST)
- Postal codes: 25882
- Dialling codes: 04862, 04864, 04865
- Vehicle registration: NF

Tetenbüll (Danish: Tetenbøl) is a municipality in the district of Nordfriesland, in Schleswig-Holstein, Germany.

== Geography and transport ==
Tetenbüll lies about 8 km northwest of Tönning and 12 km northeast of St. Peter-Ording on the Eiderstedt peninsula. The Bundesstraße 5 and the Husum–Bad St. Peter-Ording railway both run south of here. The areas Kaltenhörn, Warmhörn, and Wasserkoog all lie within the jurisdiction of Tetenbüll. In addition to this, parts of the Norderheverkoog also belong to Tetenbüll.

== Church ==
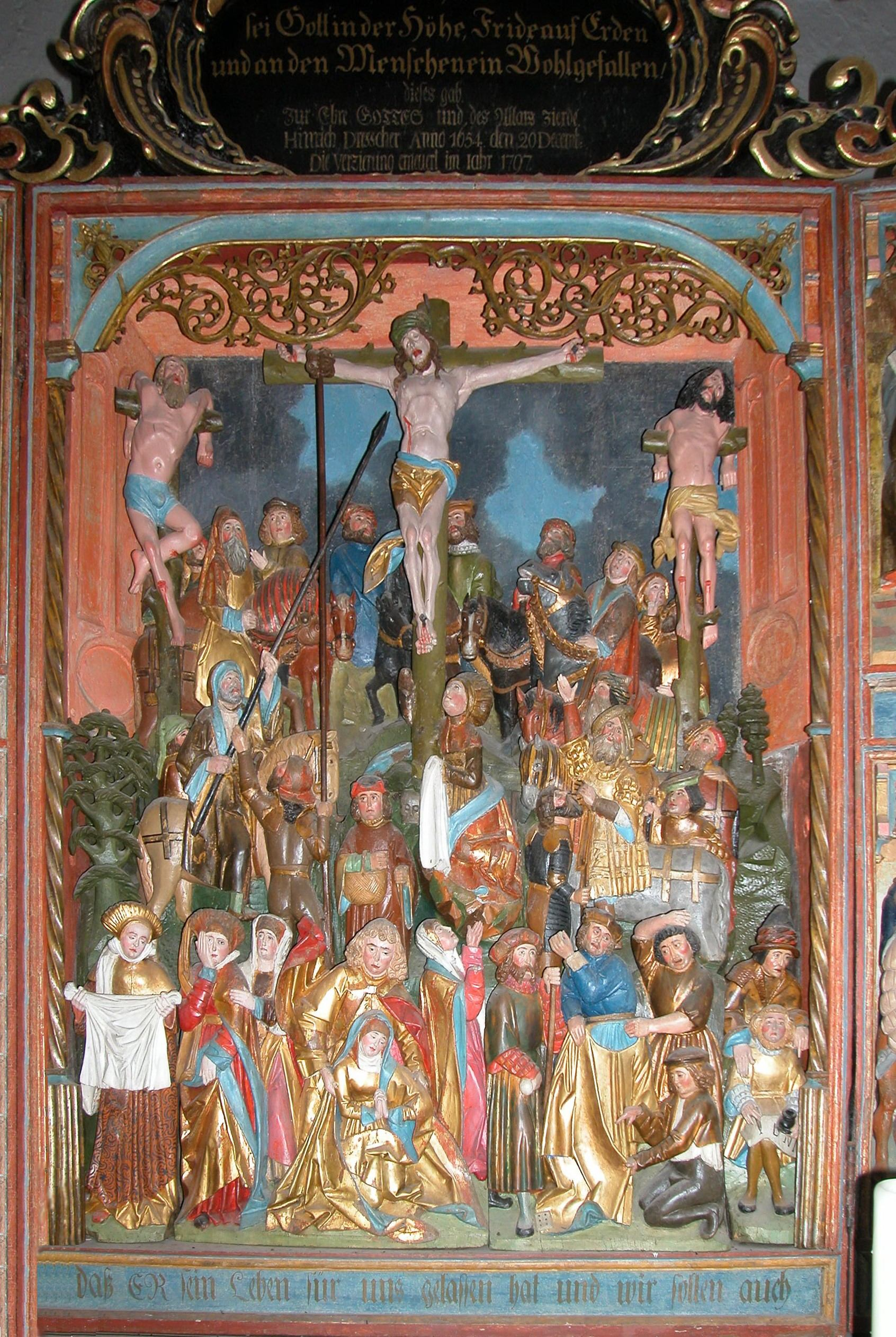
The altar of the Saint Anne church

The first church in Tetenbüll, a chapel, was built in 1113. The present church of St. Anna was built around 1400, after the embankment of the Tetenbüller Kirchenkoog. The wood-beamed ceiling is adorned with a painting from the 18th century showing the way of Christ. On the north gallery, built in 1612, there are pictures of 30 scenes from the Old Testament.

== See also ==
- Eiderstedt Peninsula
