= Welt =

Welt, welts or variants may refer to:

== Media ==
- Die Welt (The World), a German national newspaper
  - Welt am Sonntag (World on Sunday), the Sunday edition of Die Welt
- Die Welt (Herzl), former weekly newspaper in Vienna, Austria
- Welt (TV channel), a German television news channel and website
- WELT-LP, a low-power community radio station in Fort Wayne, Indiana
- The Welts, a 2004 Polish film directed by Magdalena Piekorz

== Music ==
- Welt (band), a punk rock band from Orange County, California
- Welt (album), an album by ohGr
- "Welt", a 2007 song from AM Conspiracy's album Out of the Shallow End
- "Welt", a 2017 song by Chelsea Wolfe from Hiss Spun

== Other uses ==
- Welt, a term in Heidegger's philosophy
- Welt (bruise), a skin lesion
- Welt, Germany, a village in Schleswig-Holstein, Germany
- Welt (shoe), a part of a shoe
- Welt Yang, a recurring character from the Honkai series
