= Flensburg–Husum–Tönning Railway Company =

Railway line in Germany and Denmark

The Flensburg–Husum–Tönning Railway Company built the first railway line in the Danish Duchy of Schleswig. The line (Frederik den Syvendes Sydslesvigske Jernbane) opened in 1854 and was one of the first Danish railways.

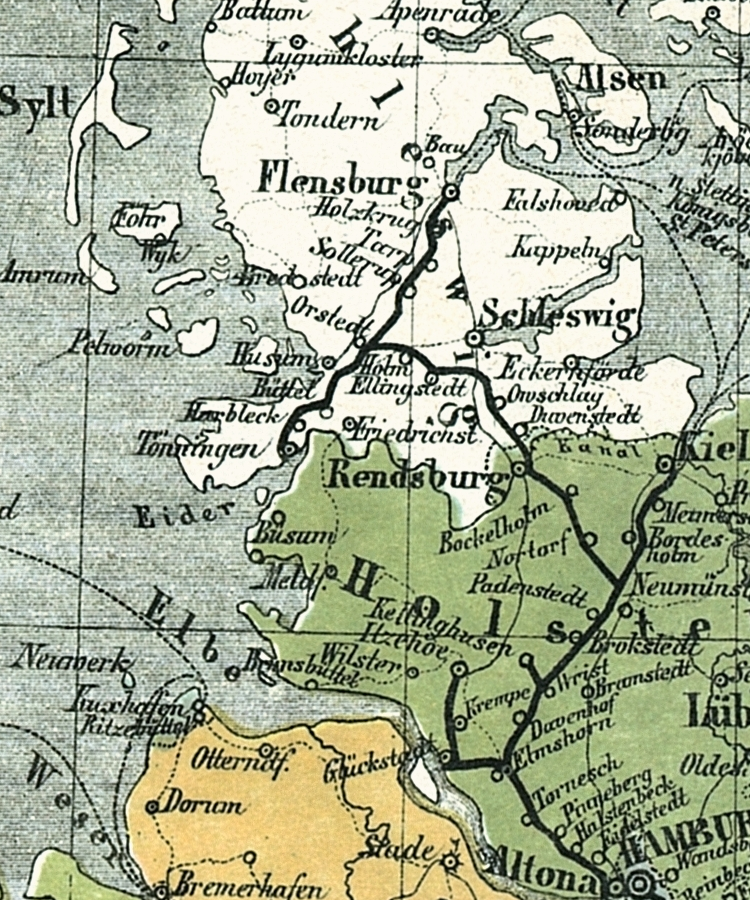
Flensburg–Husum–Tönning line with spur to Rendsburg north of the former German-Danish border (extract from German rail map of 1861)

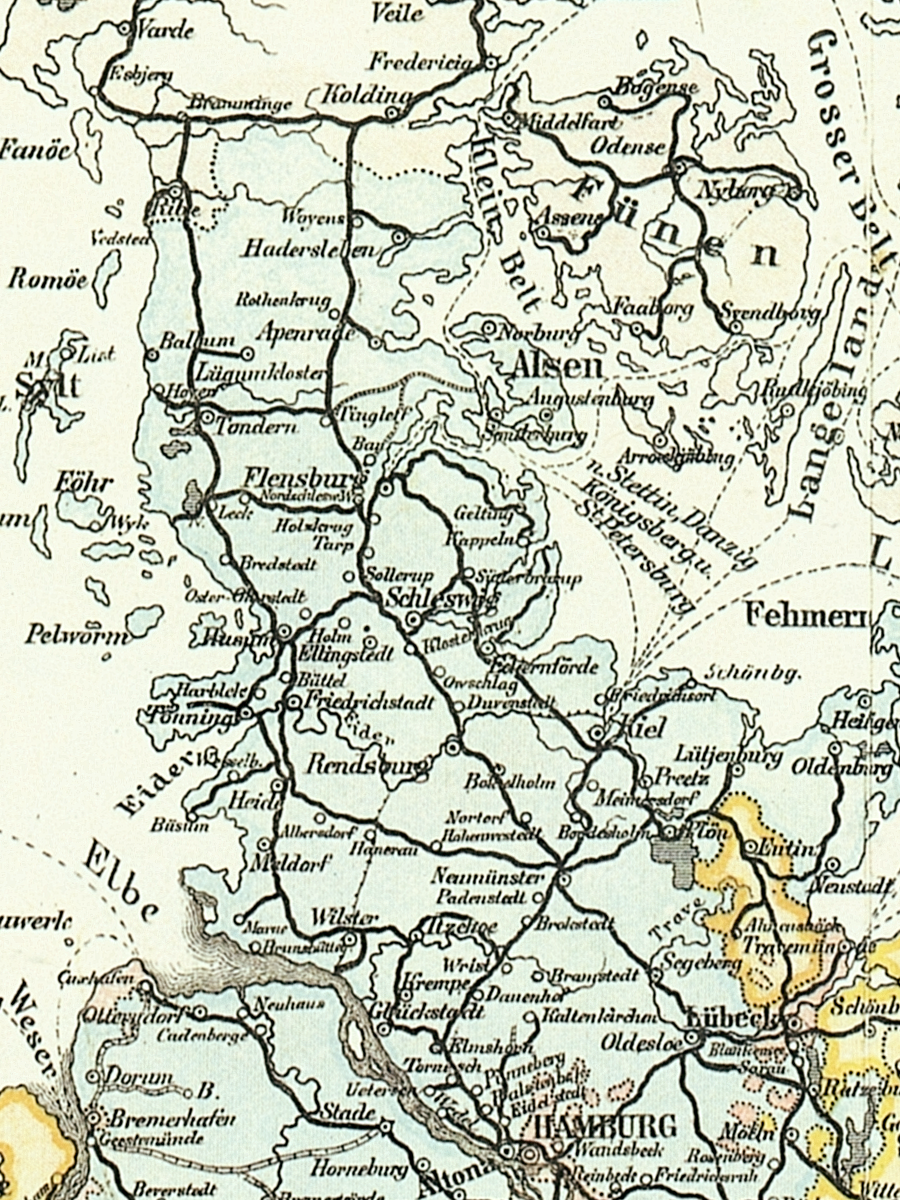
Changes in 1899 (extract from German rail map of 1899)

== Organisation and construction ==
The Flensburg-Husum-Tönninger Railway Company (Danish: Flensborg-Husum-Tønning jernbaneselskab, German: Flensburg-Husum-Tönninger Eisenbahngesellschaft, FHTE) was owned by the British entrepreneur, Sir Samuel Morton Peto and built its trunk line during the reign of Frederick VII of Denmark from 1852 to 1854. The company also built the port railways in Flensburg and Tönning. A major reason for the creation of a rail link between the Baltic port of Flensburg and the North Sea ports of Husum and especially Tönning on the Eider estuary was the export of live cattle to England. A temporary station was commissioned on 1 April 1854 and the permanent “English" station was fully opened in Flensburg on 4 October 1854, with a formal inauguration by the King on 25 October. At the same time, an important branch line was opened from Oster-Ohrstedt via Klosterkrug (now a station in the city of Schleswig) to Rendsburg, connecting to the Neumünster–Rendsburg line—opened on 18 September 1845 by the Rendsburg-Neumünster Railway Company (Rendsburg-Neumünsterschen Eisenbahn-Gesellschaft, RNE)—which in turn connected with the Hamburg-Altona–Kiel line. An extension to the north from Holzkrug in Flensburg to Haderslev (now in Denmark) was completed on 2 May 1866. The year before the railway had been incorporated into the Schleswig Railway Company (Schleswigschen Eisenbahn).

== Route changes ==
While most of the route is still in operation, sections have disappeared, some of them in the transformation of the Schleswig's rail network after the conquest of the country by the kingdoms of Kingdom of Prussia and Austria in 1864 and its subsequent annexation by Prussia in 1866. On 29 December 1866, a section between Eggebek and Oster-Ohrstedt was abandoned and replaced by a more direct connection to Jübek on the new north-south line opened between Klosterkrug and Eggebek, where it connected with the line to Flensburg. In 1886 a connection was built between Platenhörn on the Husum–Tönning line and a junction at Hörn on a new extension of the Marsh Railway from Heide to Husum, which ran a little to the east of the Tönning line. In 1902, the old line between Husum and Platenhörn was dismantled. In 1928, the current Flensburg station replaced the old terminus at the end of the fjord, which became Germany's first bus station.

As a result of restructuring, the Flensburg-Husum-Tönning line now forms parts of three different rail lines:

- Neumünster–Flensburg,
- Jübek–Husum and
- Husum–Bad St. Peter-Ording.
