= Grothusenkoog =

Grothusenkoog Grothusen Kog
- Municipality
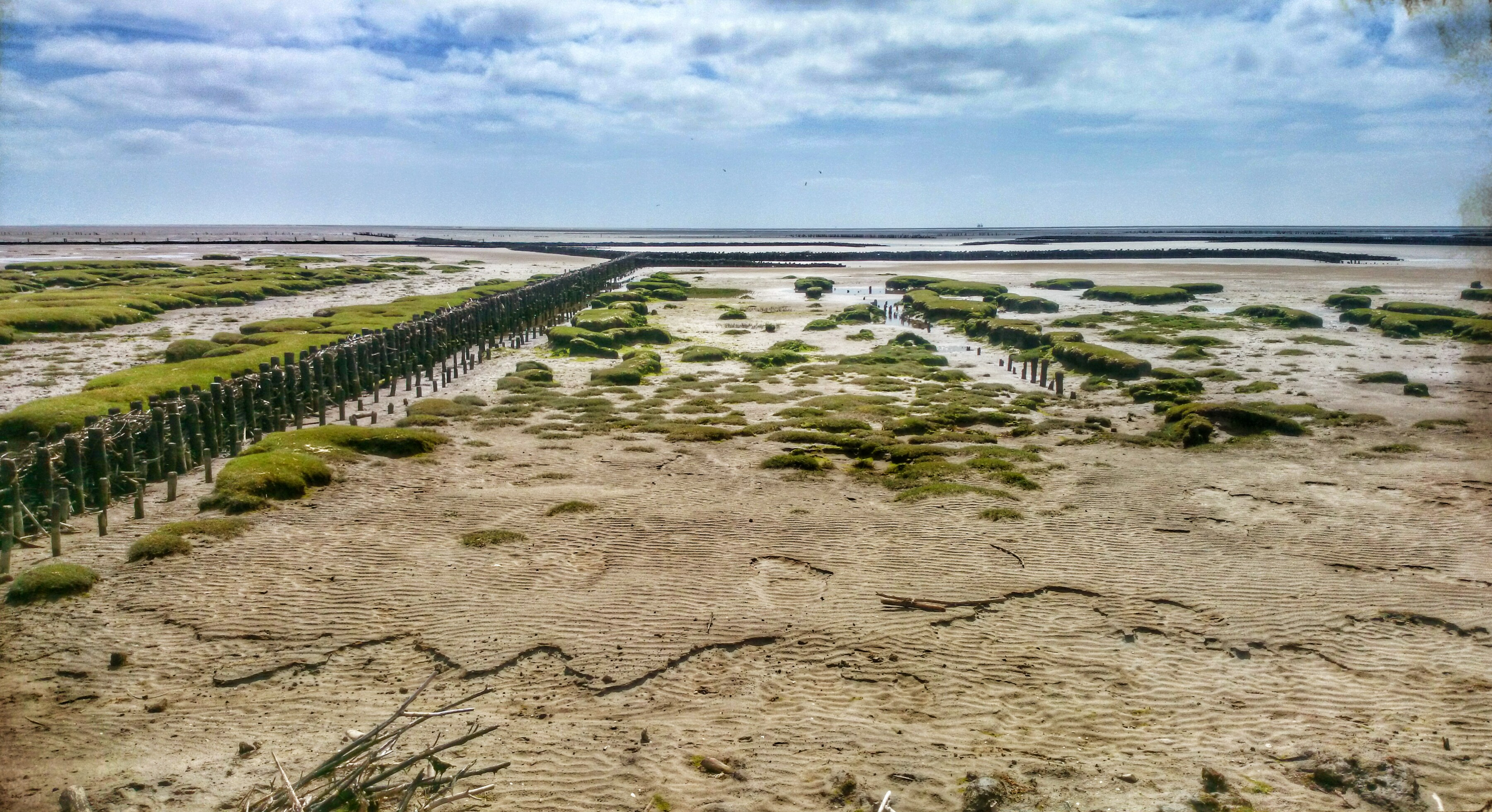

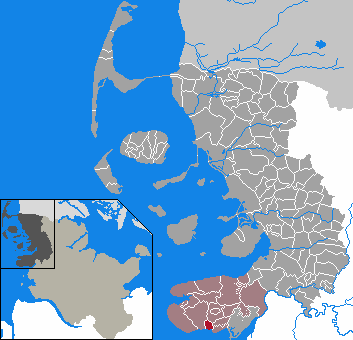
- Location of Grothusenkoog; Grothusen Kog within Nordfriesland district
- Interactive map of Grothusenkoog; Grothusen Kog
- Location within Germany Location within Schleswig-Holstein
- Coordinates: 54°17′30″N 8°45′4″E
- Country: Germany
- State: Schleswig-Holstein
- District: Nordfriesland

Government
  - Mayor: Klaus Ibs

Area
  - Total: 3.27 km^{2} (1.26 sq mi)
- Elevation: 1 m (3.3 ft)

Population (2025-12-31)
  - Total: 28
  - Density: 8.6/km^{2} (22/sq mi)
- Time zone: UTC+01:00 (CET)
  - Summer (DST): UTC+02:00 (CEST)
- Postal codes: 25836
- Dialling codes: 04862
- Vehicle registration: NF
- Website: www.amt-eiderstedt. kommunen. nordfriesland. city-map.de

Grothusenkoog (Danish: Grothusen Kog) is a municipality in the district of Nordfriesland, in Schleswig-Holstein, Germany.

== See also ==
- Eiderstedt Peninsula
