= Osterhever =

Osterhever Østerhever
- Municipality
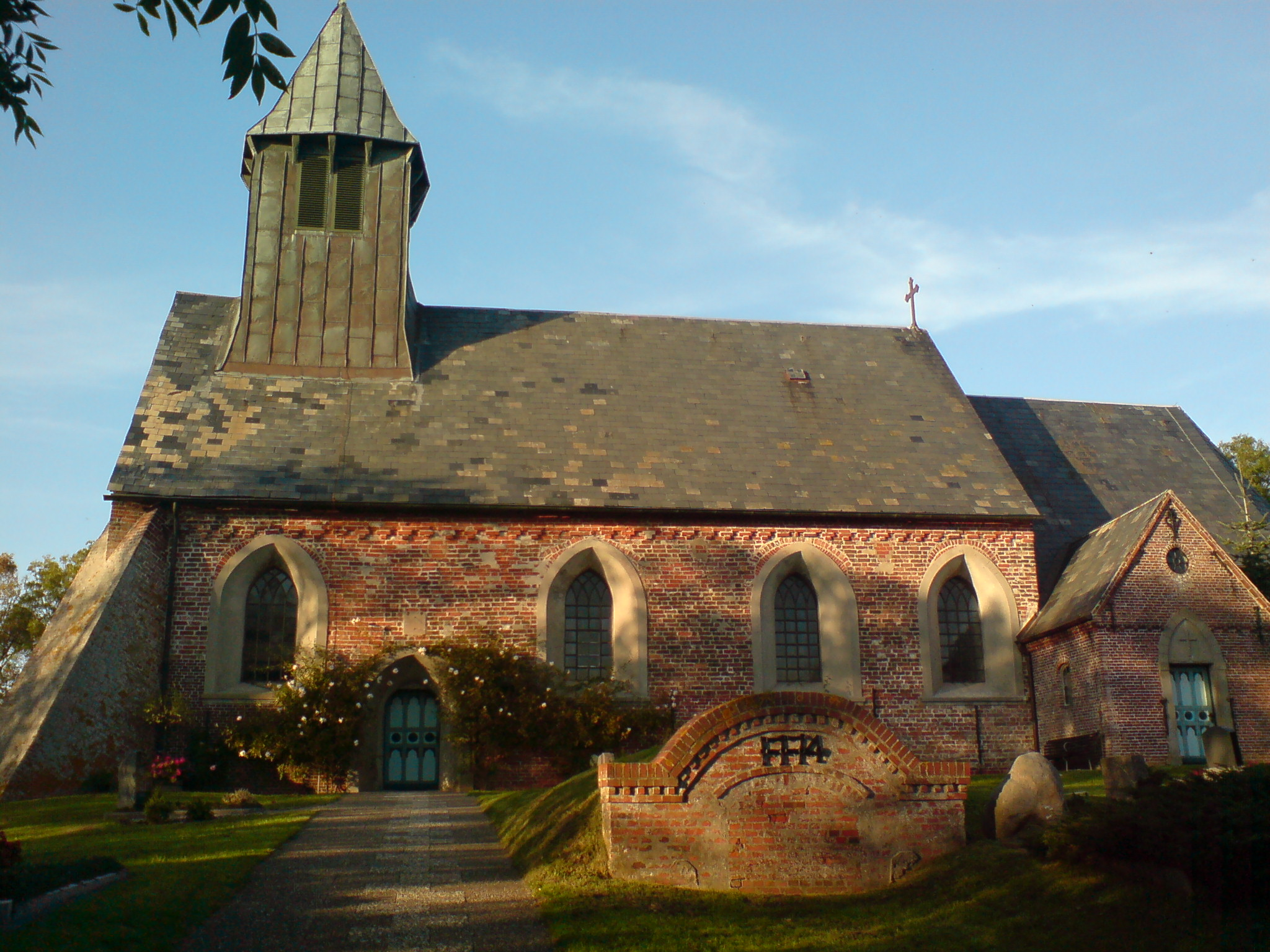
- St. Martin's church

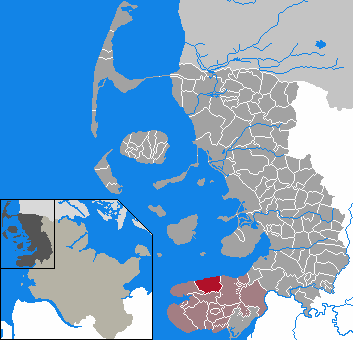
- Location of Osterhever; Østerhever within Nordfriesland district
- Interactive map of Osterhever; Østerhever
- Location within Germany Location within Schleswig-Holstein
- Coordinates: 54°23′N 8°47′E
- Country: Germany
- State: Schleswig-Holstein
- District: Nordfriesland

Government
  - Mayor: Ove Becker Ketels

Area
  - Total: 18.43 km^{2} (7.12 sq mi)
- Elevation: 0 m (0 ft)

Population (2025-12-31)
  - Total: 220
  - Density: 12/km^{2} (31/sq mi)
- Time zone: UTC+01:00 (CET)
  - Summer (DST): UTC+02:00 (CEST)
- Postal codes: 25836
- Dialling codes: 04865
- Vehicle registration: NF
- Website: www.amt-eiderstedt. kommunen. nordfriesland. city-map.de

Osterhever is a municipality in the district of Nordfriesland, in Schleswig-Holstein, Germany.

== See also ==
- Eiderstedt peninsula
