= Vollerwiek =

Vollerwiek Follervig / Folerwiik
- Municipality
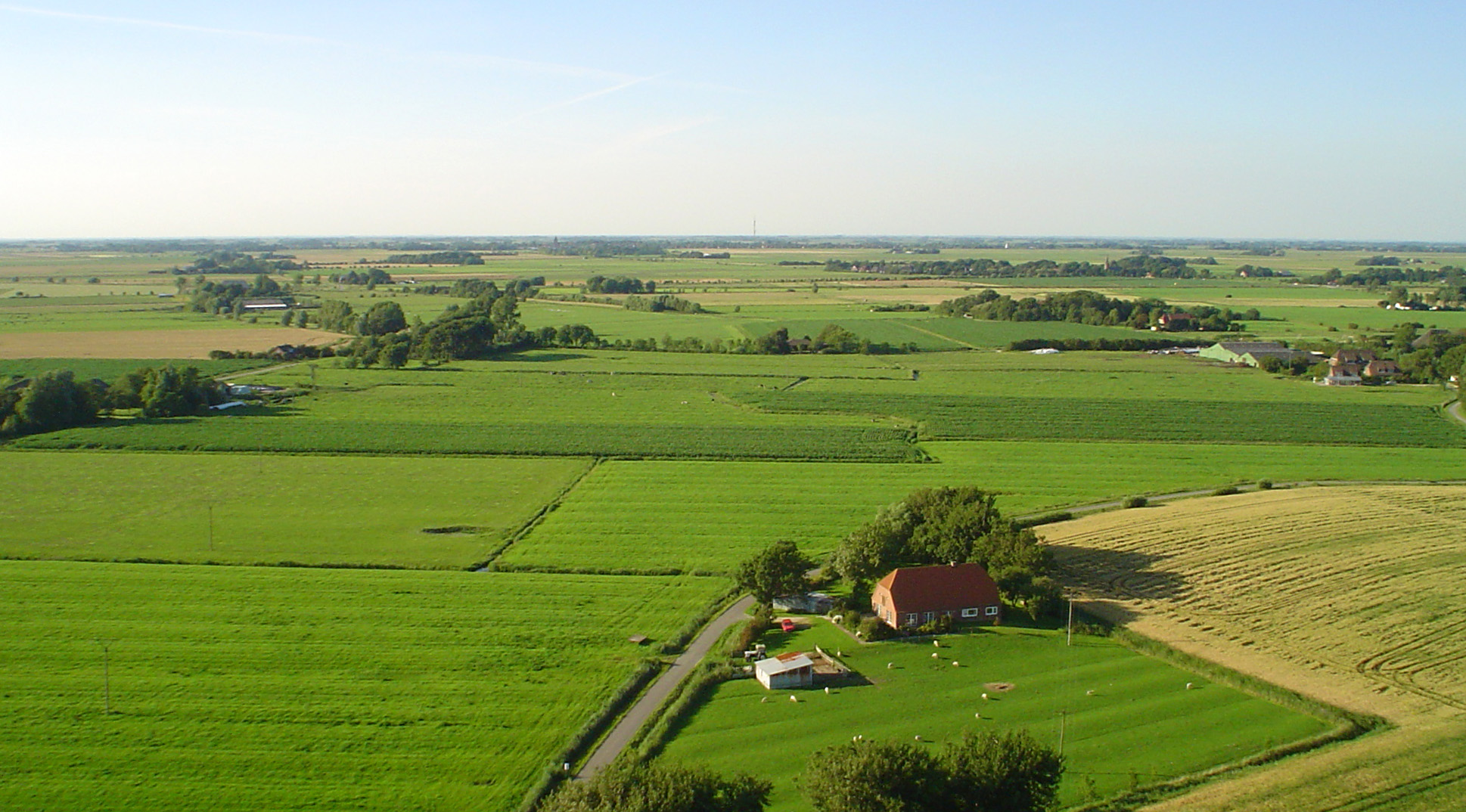
- The village

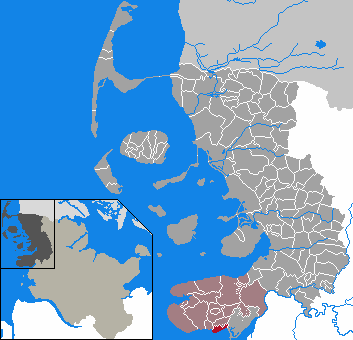
- Location of Vollerwiek; Follervig / Folerwiik within Nordfriesland district
- Interactive map of Vollerwiek; Follervig / Folerwiik
- Location within Germany Location within Schleswig-Holstein
- Coordinates: 54°17′34″N 8°47′39″E
- Country: Germany
- State: Schleswig-Holstein
- District: Nordfriesland

Government
  - Mayor: Volker Holdack

Area
  - Total: 4.62 km^{2} (1.78 sq mi)
- Elevation: 2 m (6.6 ft)

Population (2025-12-31)
  - Total: 201
  - Density: 43.5/km^{2} (113/sq mi)
- Time zone: UTC+01:00 (CET)
  - Summer (DST): UTC+02:00 (CEST)
- Postal codes: 25836
- Dialling codes: 04862
- Vehicle registration: NF

Vollerwiek (Danish: Follervig, North Frisian: Folerwiik) is a municipality in the district of Nordfriesland, in Schleswig-Holstein, Germany.

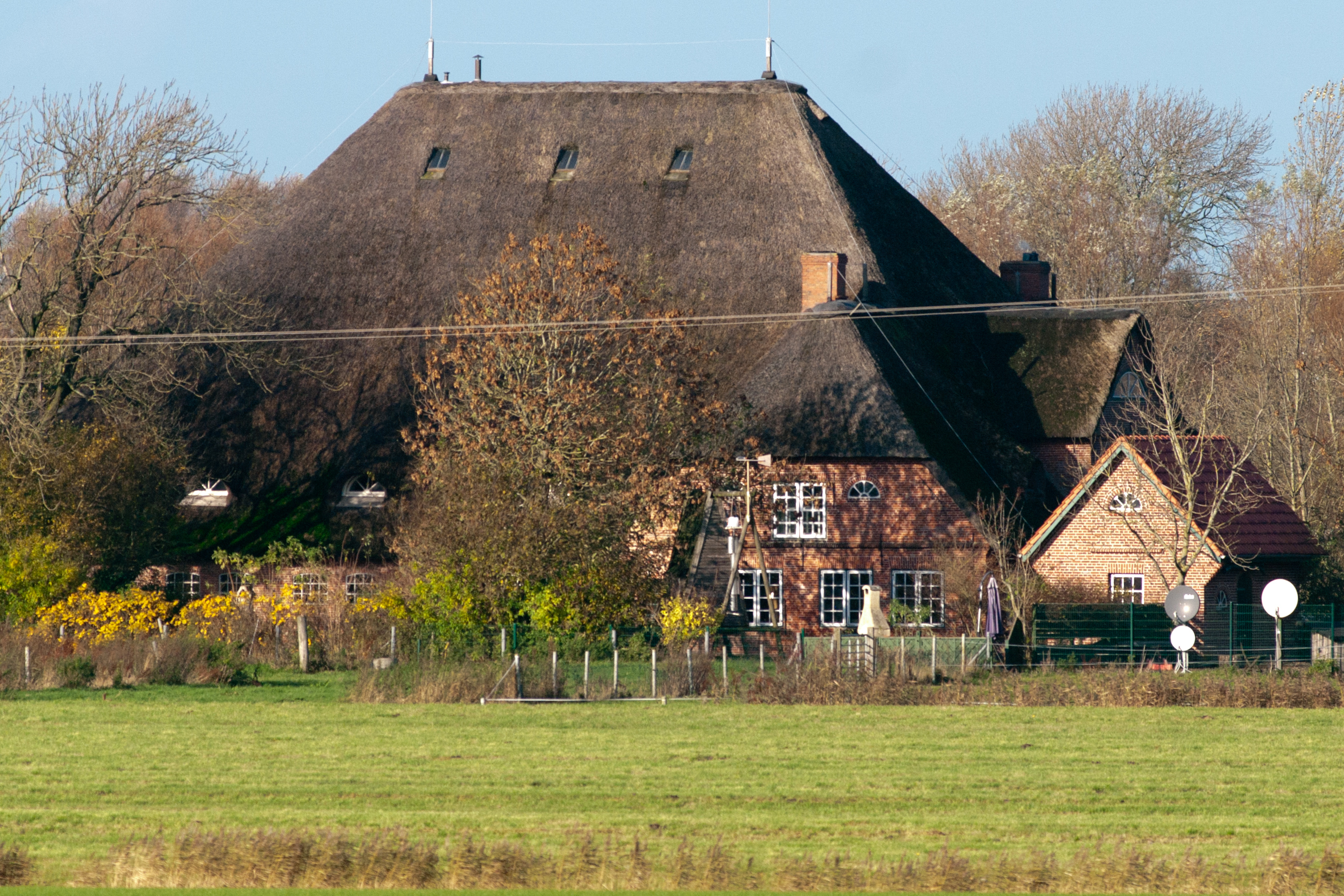
House with thatched roof

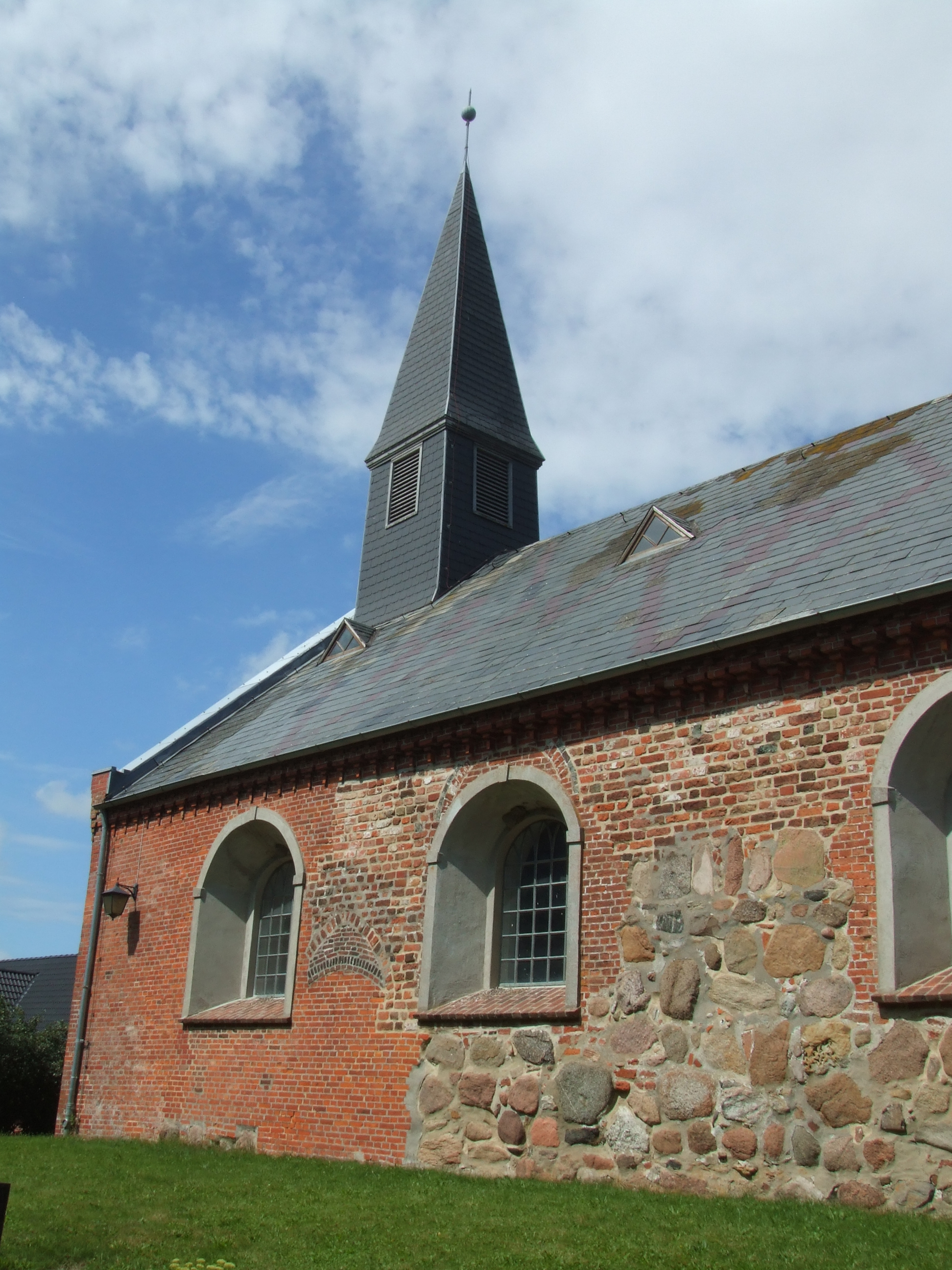
Church

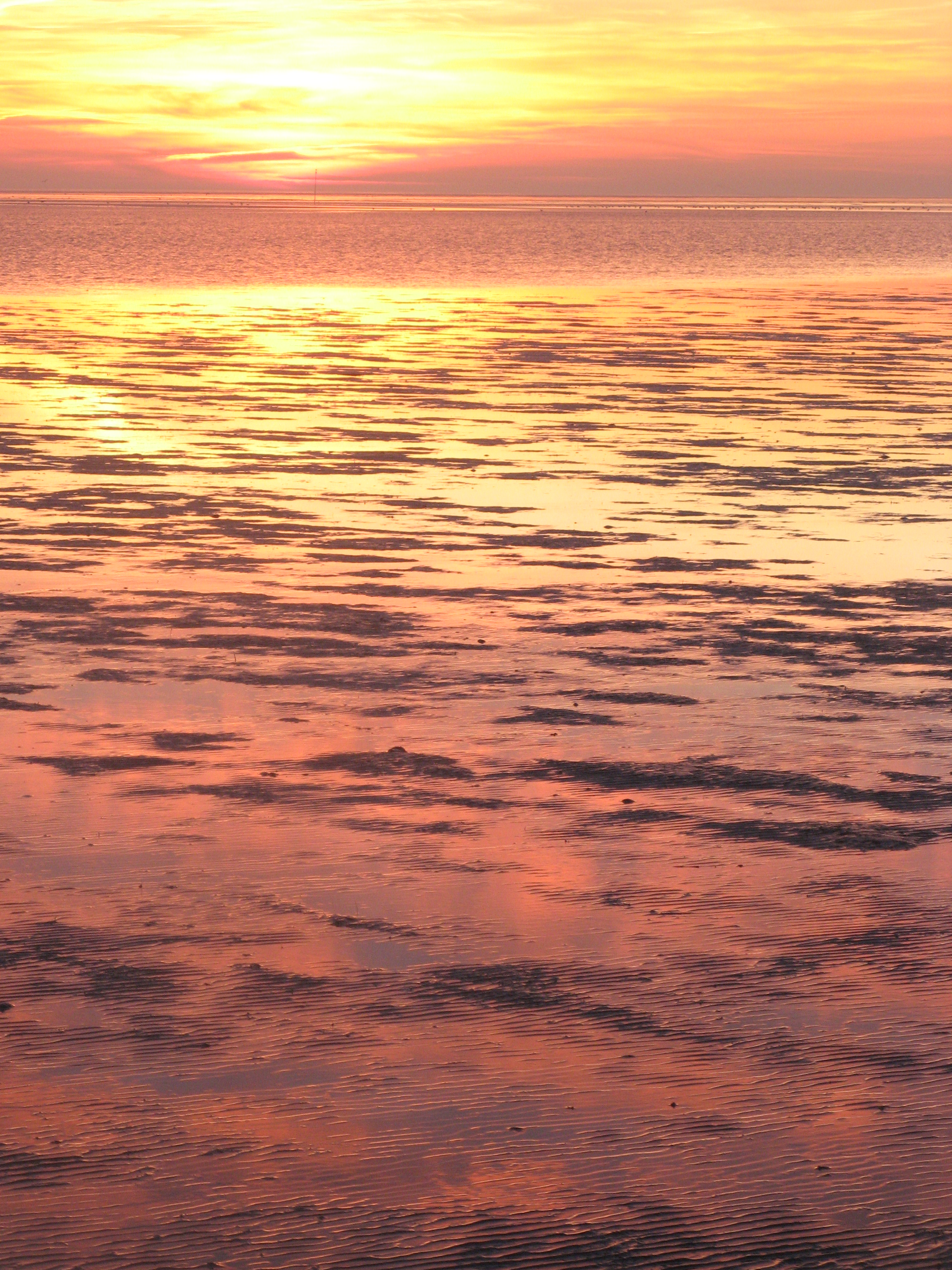
Wadden sea

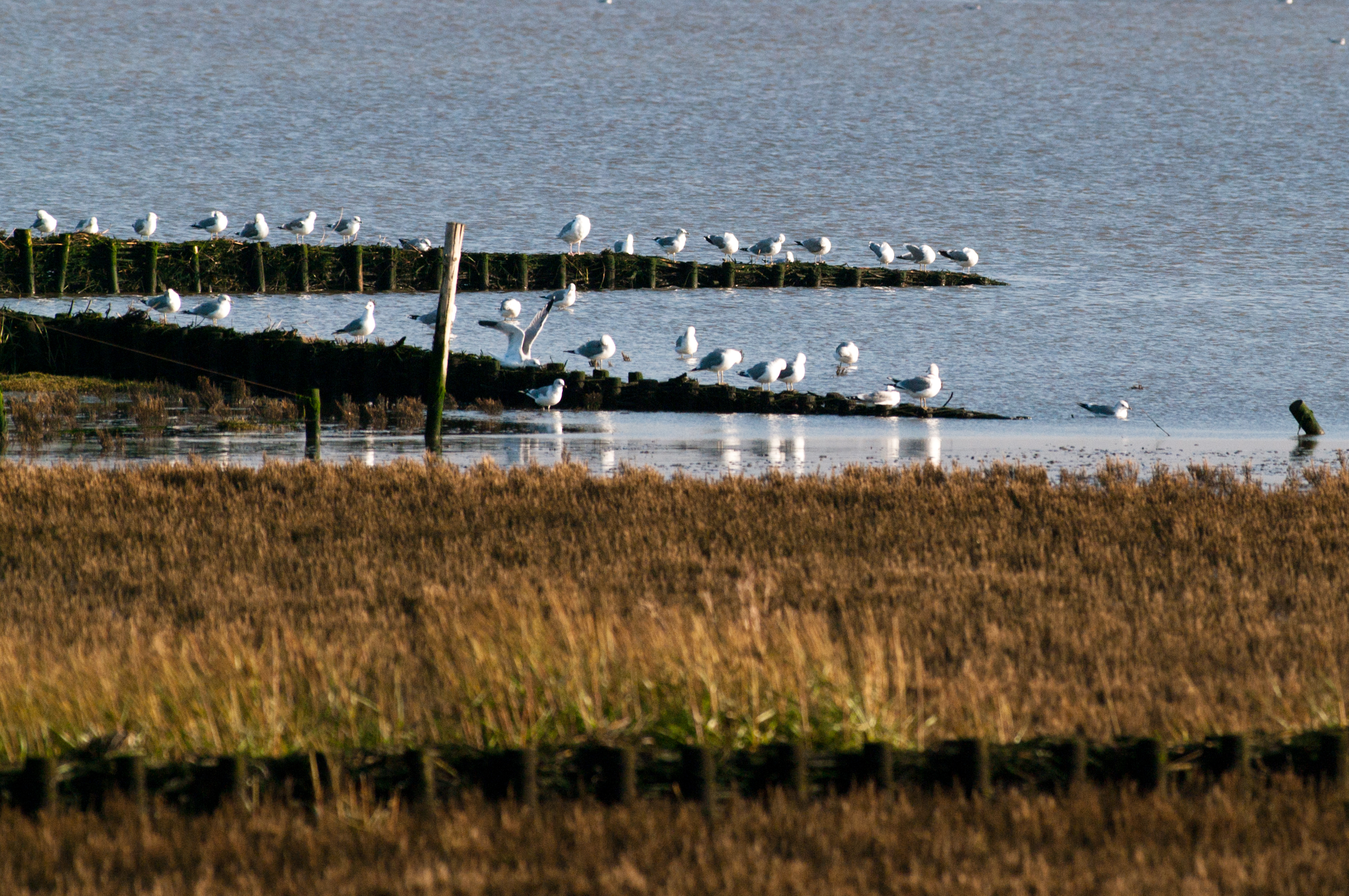
Salt marshes

== See also ==
- Eiderstedt Peninsula
