= Husum–Bad St. Peter-Ording railway =

Railway line in northern Germany

Husum–Bad St. Peter-Ording
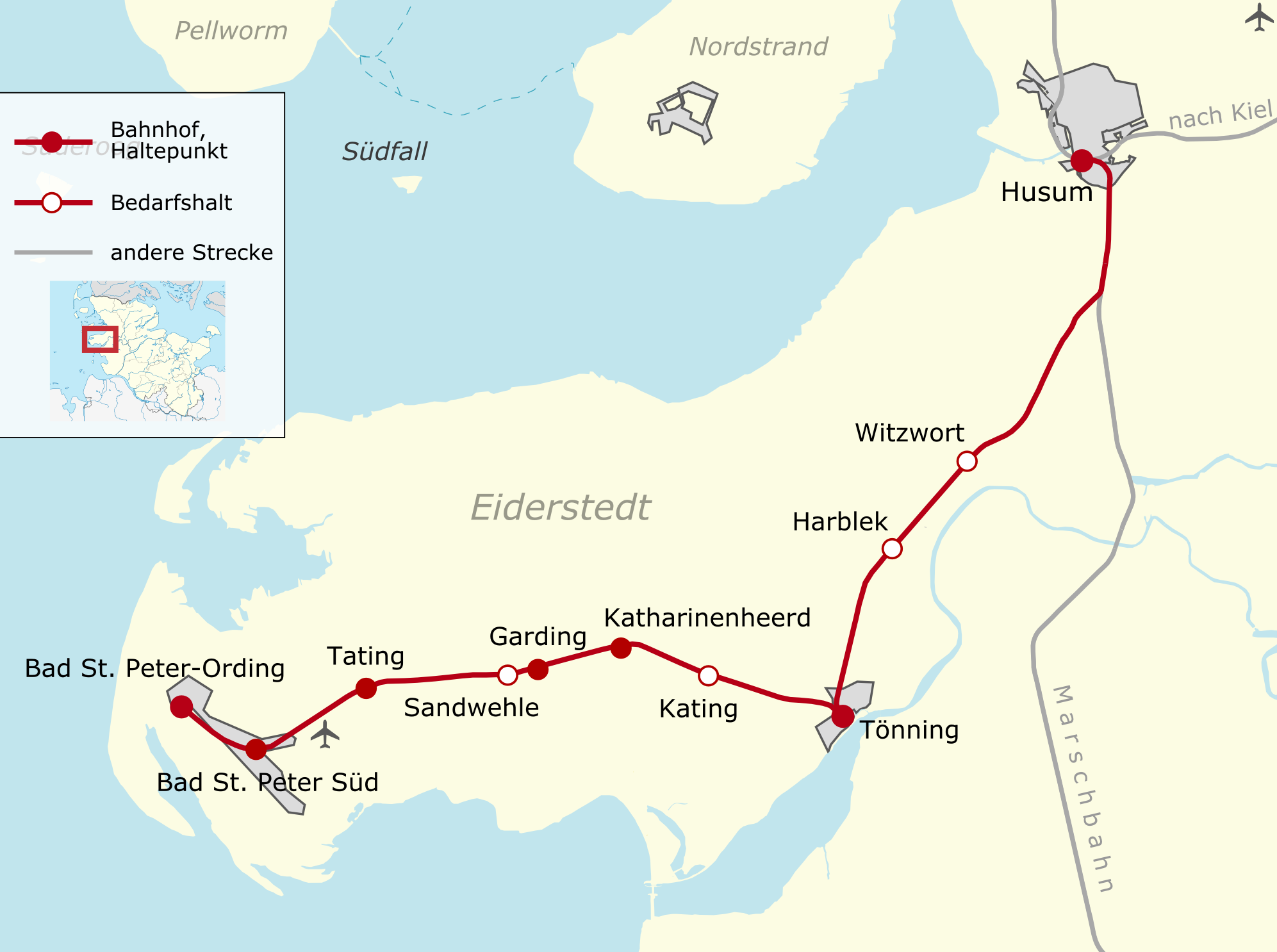

Overview
- Line number: 1204/1205
- Locale: Schleswig-Holstein, Germany

Service
- Route number: 135

Technical
- Line length: 44 km (27 mi)
- Track gauge: 1,435 mm (4 ft 8 1/2 in) standard gauge

The Husum-Bad Sankt Peter-Ording railway (also known as the Eiderstedt line) is a 44 km-long, single-track non-electrified branch line in the German state of Schleswig-Holstein. The line connects the North Frisian town of Husum with all the important parts of the Eiderstedt peninsula, including Tönning, Garding and Sankt Peter-Ording. The line opened in 1854 and was one of the oldest railways in Germany.

Passenger trains are operated by the DB Regio Schleswig-Holstein at hourly intervals.

== Route ==
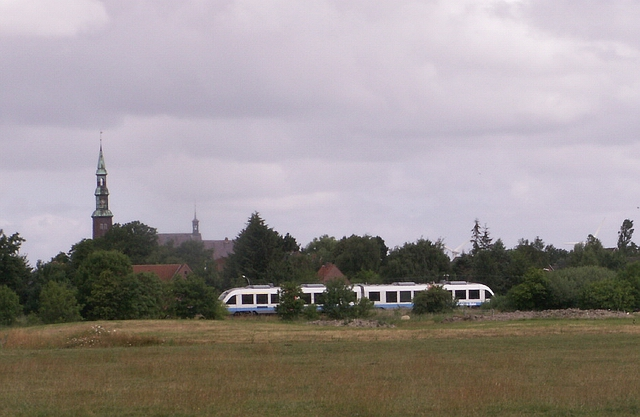
NOB train near Tating

The first section of the line from Husum station follows the Marsh Railway to Horn junction. The line passes through the flat and largely agricultural marsh land of Eiderstedt. The section of the line to Bad St. Peter-Ording branches off to the south just before Tönning station, which is a terminus where trains have to reverse to in order to continue their journey. The station acts as a passing place where trains cross each other hourly.

The only engineering works on the line after Tönning station are some bridges that are built above sluice gates for drainage and a floodgate in a dike that can be closed during storm surges near St. Peter-Ort. The only station between St. Peter-Ort and Tönning with a significant entrance building is at Katharinenheerd station.

Some stations are a significant distance to the villages they serve, including Kating and Witzwort.

== History ==
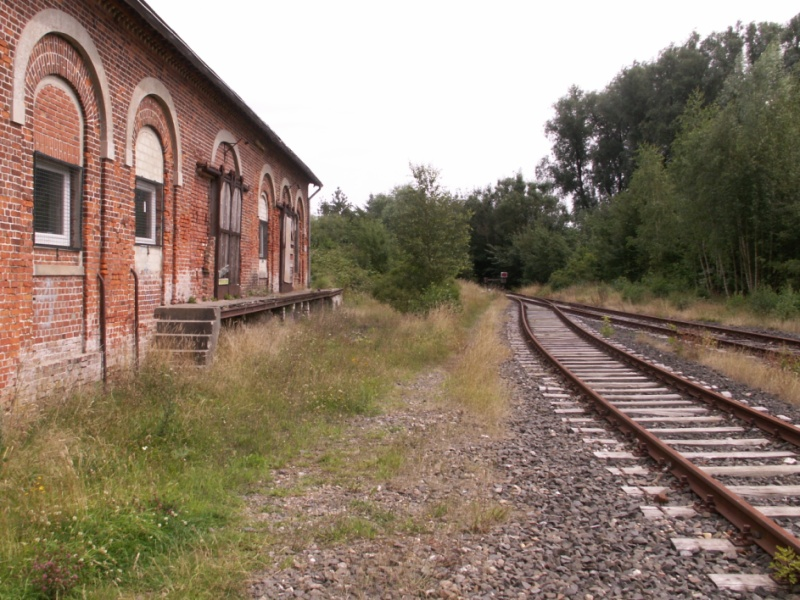
Former Tönning goods yard on the exit to the port

The section from Tönning to Husum was opened in 1854 as part of the Tönning–Flensburg line built by the Flensburg–Husum–Tönning Railway Company (Flensburg-Husum-Tönninger Eisenbahngesellschaft). The westerly branch from Tönning was opened to Garding in 1892 and was extended to St. Peter-Ording in 1932.

Tönning is now built as a terminal station, which is rare in such a rural location. Originally, the line continued through the station to a port for loading cattle to the United Kingdom. The line and port were built for this purpose by the British firm of Sir Samuel Morton Peto, along with a similar railway port in Flensburg. Not long afterwards freight loaded at Tönning port to the UK was already limited. In 1878 the possibility was raised of opening a ferry from Tönning to Karolinenkoog over the Eider, which was connected to Heide by the Heide–Karolinenkoog line opened in 1877 and from there to Hamburg. On 1 June 1886 a ferry opened and the combination of rail and ferry briefly became the fastest way to reach Hamburg from Husum, since at that time, the Marsh Railway was not yet finished to Husum, although this extension opened on 1 September 1886.

The old line went to the east of the current Hörn junction on the route of the modern B 5 highway, passing to the west of Husum and went around a 180-degree turn from the north to Husum station. The line then continued to the east towards Flensburg on the route to Jübek.

In 1886 a connection was built between Platenhörn on the Husum–Tönning line and a junction at Hörn on a new extension of the Marsh Railway from Heide to Husum, which ran a little to the east of the Tönning line. In 1902, the old line between Husum and Platenhörn was dismantled. Today only a few property lines mark the old route.

The extension of the line from Garding to St. Peter-Ording was opened 78 years after the opening of the line to Tönning due to lack of finances. Previously, guests of the spa and tourists from the end of the line at Garding were transported in horse-drawn carriages and postbuses to the popular coastal resort with its wide sandy beach. After overnight stays in St. Peter-Ording greatly increased in the 1920s and 1930s, it was decided to extend the line. The residents of both St. Peter and Ording, which were then independent towns, jockeyed to have the station named after each town. The two towns finally realised that their interests were best served by naming the station Bad (“spa”) St. Peter-Ording; although the municipalities were only merged as Bad St. Peter-Ording in 1967. The next station down the line was in the locality of St. Peter Dorf ("St. Peter village"), which was considered to sound provincial, so the station was named Bad St. Peter Süd (south).

=== Post-war period and decline ===
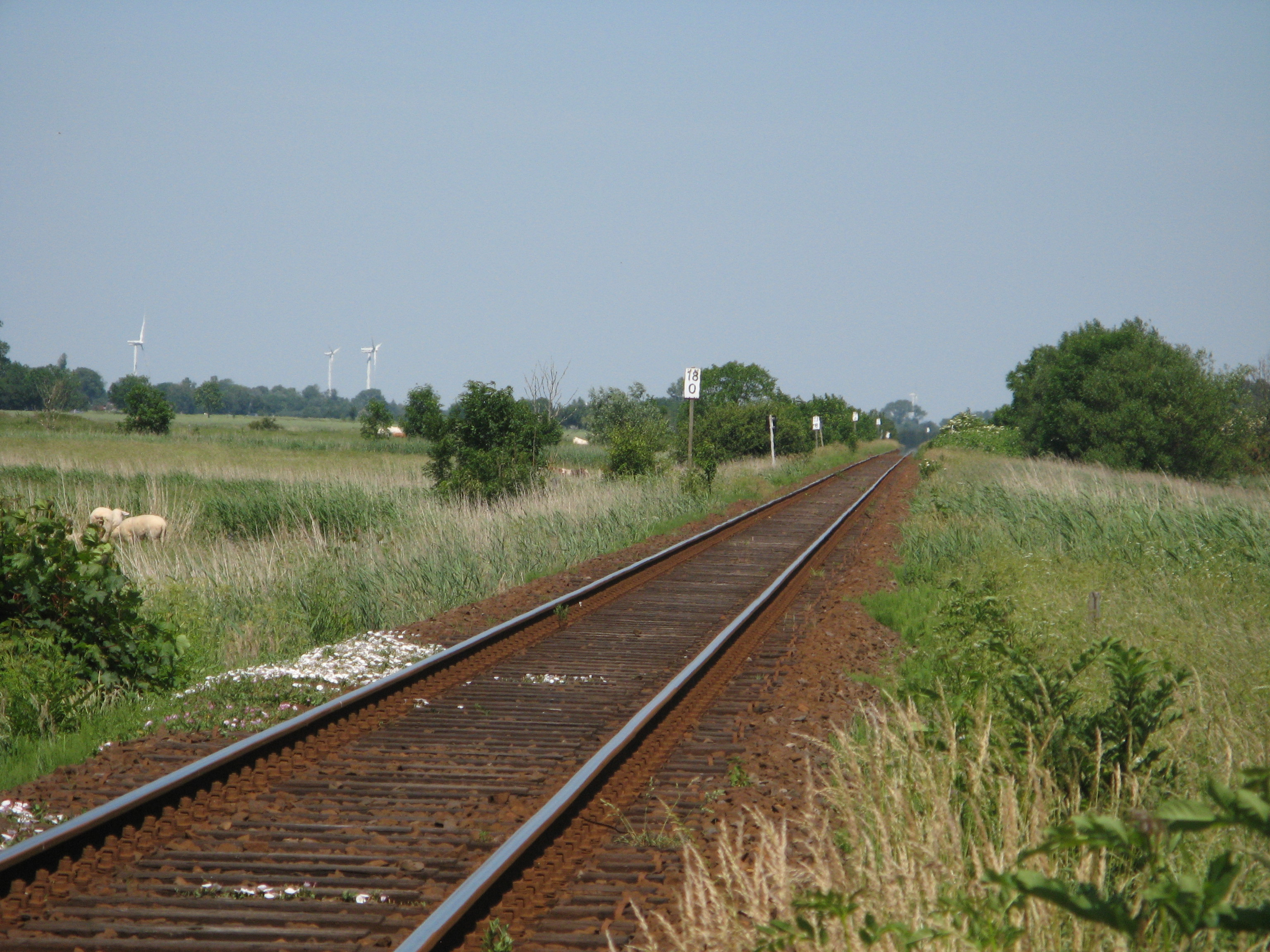
Line near the km 18.2 point

The Bad St. Peter-Ording–Garding section of the line was closed in 1945 to war damage received during the Second World War. It returned to regular operations in 1947.

In the early days, the line was operated with steam trains, then with Deutsche Bundesbahn class V 36 diesel locomotives and red Donnerbüchse carriages. In the winter timetable of 1960 the line was converted to operate with Uerdingen railbuses (classes VT 95 and VT 98, "piglet taxis"), with up to six carriages. Passenger services were later provided by battery-powered railcars.

Like many other local railways the Eiderstedt line ran downhill from the mid-1950s: gradually, passenger traffic declined, freight traffic was abandoned, rail tracks were dismantled and connection times in Husum deteriorated. Difficulties with baggage handling and the use of uneconomic train sets (DB Class V 100 with Silberling control cars) signalled a decline of the line.

Eventually a proposal for the total closure of the line was discussed, because the then cash-strapped Deutsche Bundesbahn was responsible for funding low volume lines. Therefore, Deutsche Bundesbahn submitted proposals to the Ministry of Transport in 1976 and around 1983 to close the line, leading to anger and criticism in the municipalities in the North Friesland district, which saw the line as vital for tourism. As a result of large protests, the federal government turned down the application to close the line.

=== Renaissance and new operators ===
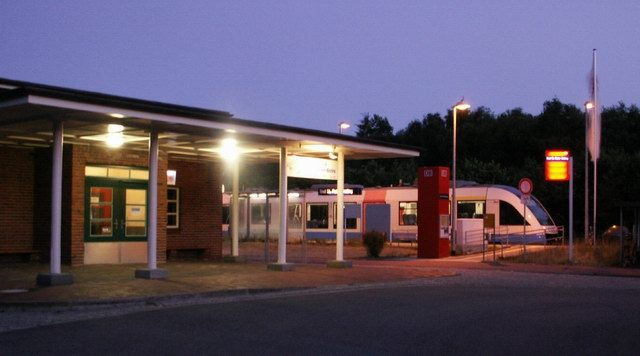
Bad St Peter-Ording station

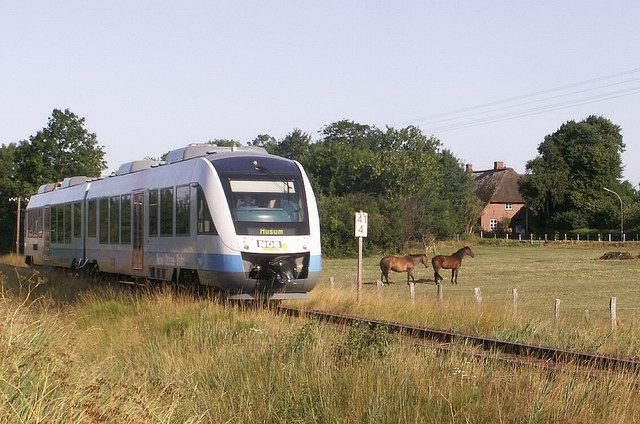
LINT DMU near St. Peter

As a result of pressure from the state of Schleswig-Holstein, the Deutsche Bundesbahn has invested in the line since the early 1990s. The introduction of regional fast trains (Regionalschnellbahnen) and hourly regular interval services with modern class DB-628 diesel multiple units transformed the line. The operation was thus more efficient, faster and more attractive. In 2000 the Nord-Ostsee-Bahn (NOB) service (now a subsidiary of Veolia Verkehr) won the tender with Alstom Coradia LINT and Bombardier Talent diesel multiple units. This company initiated consistent services from early morning to late evening and introduced Gleisradio (track radio), a special passenger information system using GPS. Some of the rail services operate via Husum, Schleswig and Rendsburg to Kiel. Since 2011 services on the line have been operated by DB Regio Schleswig-Holstein (formerly called Regionalbahn Schleswig-Holstein), a subsidiary of DB Regio.

The line is particularly important for tourism and is an important access to the North Sea resort of Bad St. Peter-Ording, but is also important for student and commuter traffic. Consequently, in the summer months 3,000 people use the line each day and about 1600 people per day use it in the winter.

The whole line is controlled using electromechanical signalling by the signalman at Tönning station. The eastern part of the line to Horn junction uses an adaptation of the electronic interlocking of Husum. The section from Tönning to Bad St. Peter-Ording is operated as a branch line using Automatic Block Signal.
