= Kotzenbüll =

Kotzenbüll Kotzenbøl
- Municipality
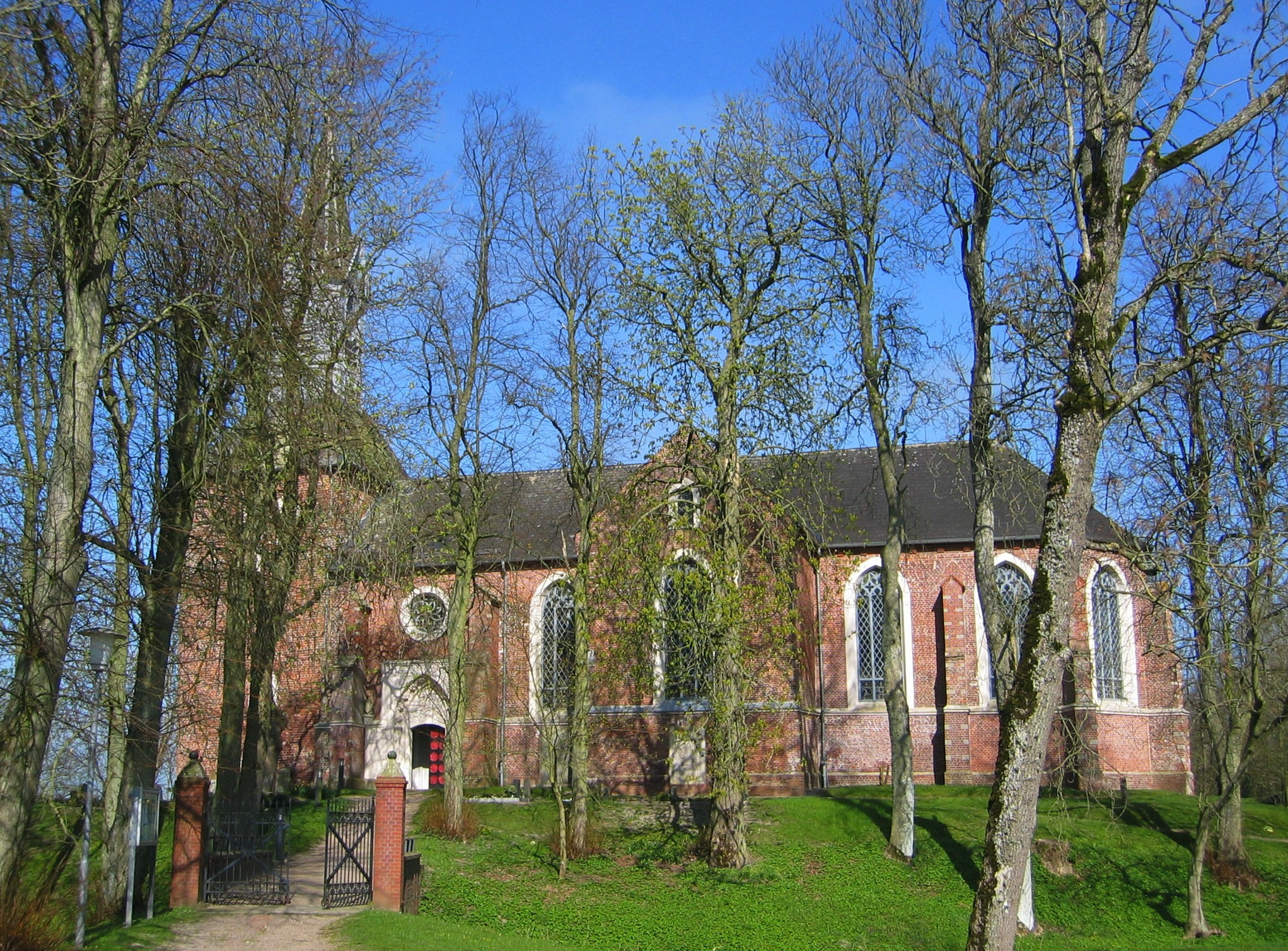
- St. Nicholas church

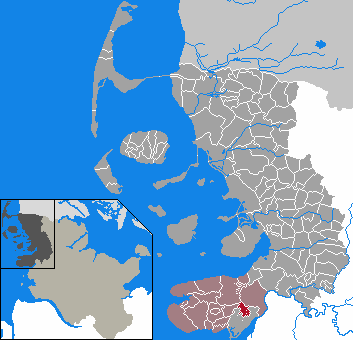
- Location of Kotzenbüll; Kotzenbøl within Nordfriesland district
- Interactive map of Kotzenbüll; Kotzenbøl
- Location within Germany Location within Schleswig-Holstein
- Coordinates: 54°20′3″N 8°54′39″E
- Country: Germany
- State: Schleswig-Holstein
- District: Nordfriesland

Government
  - Mayor: Hans Boy Wolff

Area
  - Total: 7.77 km^{2} (3.00 sq mi)
- Elevation: 2 m (6.6 ft)

Population (2025-12-31)
  - Total: 175
  - Density: 22.5/km^{2} (58.3/sq mi)
- Time zone: UTC+01:00 (CET)
  - Summer (DST): UTC+02:00 (CEST)
- Postal codes: 25832
- Dialling codes: 04861
- Vehicle registration: NF

Kotzenbüll (Danish: Kotzenbøl or Kotsenbøl) is a municipality in the district of Nordfriesland, in Schleswig-Holstein, Germany.

== See also ==
- Eiderstedt peninsula
