= Welt, Germany =

Welt
- Municipality
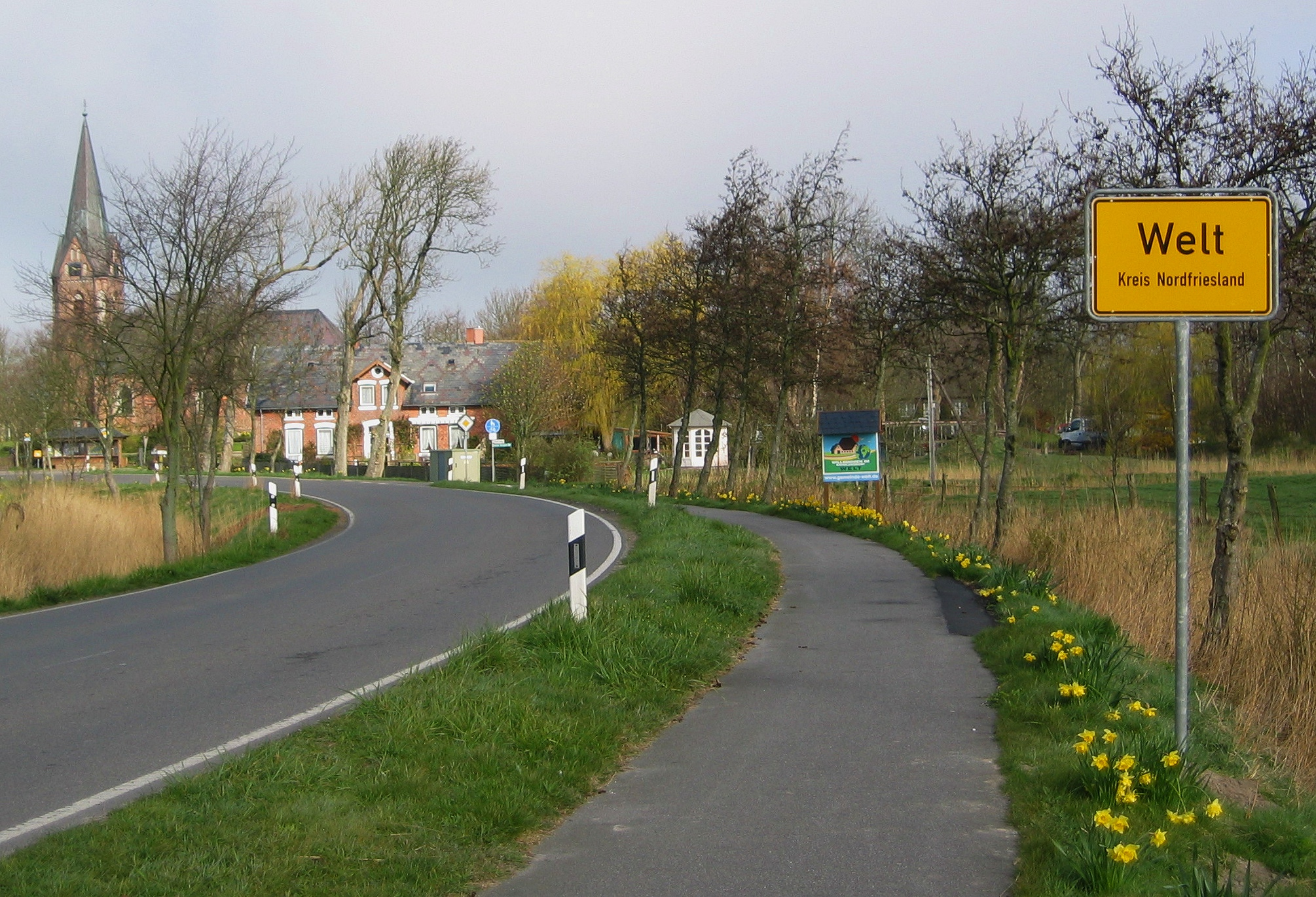

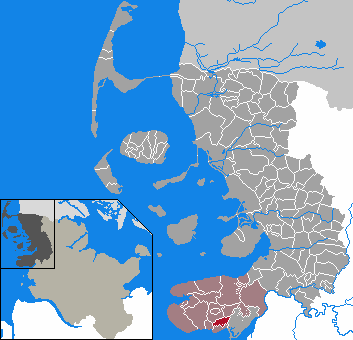
- Location of Welt within Nordfriesland district
- Interactive map of Welt
- Location within Germany Location within Schleswig-Holstein
- Coordinates: 54°18′N 8°48′E
- Country: Germany
- State: Schleswig-Holstein
- District: Nordfriesland

Government
  - Mayor: Michael Schepat

Area
  - Total: 8.2 km^{2} (3.2 sq mi)
- Elevation: 0 m (0 ft)

Population (2025-12-31)
  - Total: 194
  - Density: 24/km^{2} (61/sq mi)
- Time zone: UTC+01:00 (CET)
  - Summer (DST): UTC+02:00 (CEST)
- Postal codes: 25836
- Dialling codes: 04862
- Vehicle registration: NF
- Website: gemeinde-welt.de

Welt (German pronunciation: [vɛlt]; Danish: Velt; North Frisian: Wäilt) is a village in the district of Nordfriesland, Schleswig-Holstein, Germany. It is notable in that its name is identical to the German word meaning "world".

== See also ==
- Eiderstedt peninsula
