= Tating =

- Municipality
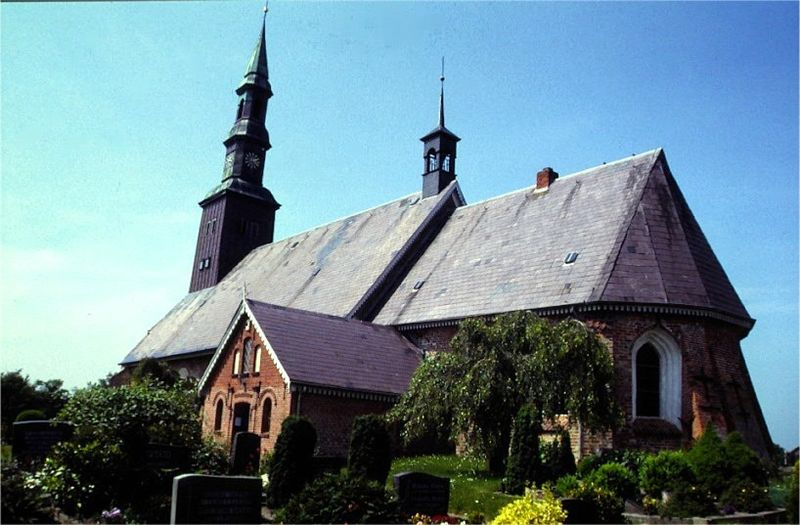
- St. Magnus' church in Tating

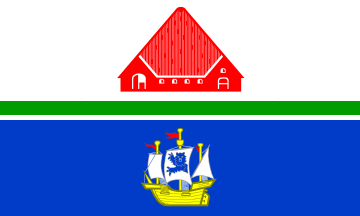
- Flag Coat of arms

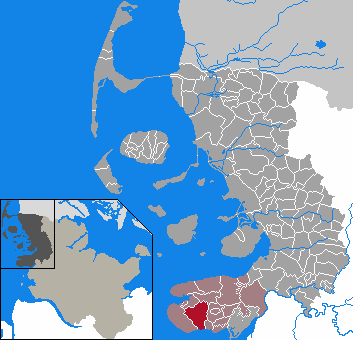
- Location of Tating within Nordfriesland district
- Interactive map of Tating
- Location within Germany Location within Schleswig-Holstein
- Coordinates: 54°20′N 8°43′E
- Country: Germany
- State: Schleswig-Holstein
- District: Nordfriesland

Government
  - Mayor: Hans Jacob Peters

Area
  - Total: 29.49 km^{2} (11.39 sq mi)
- Elevation: 0 m (0 ft)

Population (2025-12-31)
  - Total: 954
  - Density: 32.3/km^{2} (83.8/sq mi)
- Time zone: UTC+01:00 (CET)
  - Summer (DST): UTC+02:00 (CEST)
- Postal codes: 25881
- Dialling codes: 04862
- Vehicle registration: NF
- Website: www.tating.de

Tating is a municipality in the district of Nordfriesland, in Schleswig-Holstein, Germany.

== See also ==
- Eiderstedt peninsula
