= Katharinenheerd =

Katharinenheerd Katrineherd
- Municipality
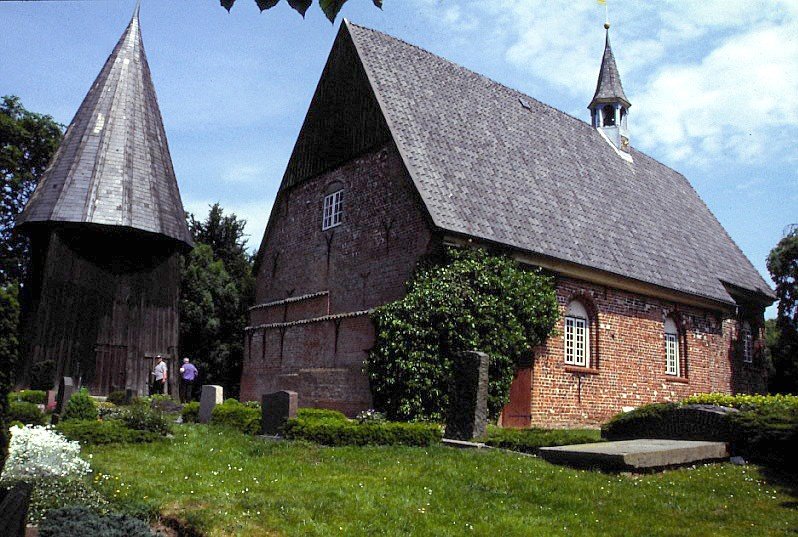
- The church at Katharinenheerd

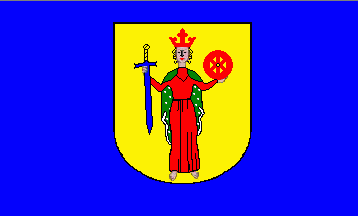
- Flag Coat of arms

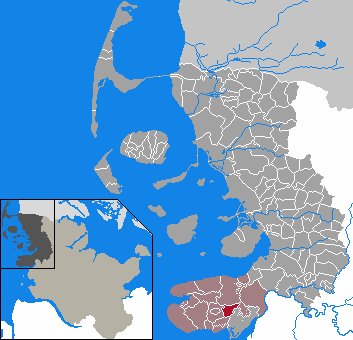
- Location of Katharinenheerd; Katrineherd within Nordfriesland district
- Interactive map of Katharinenheerd; Katrineherd
- Location within Germany Location within Schleswig-Holstein
- Coordinates: 54°20′N 8°50′E
- Country: Germany
- State: Schleswig-Holstein
- District: Nordfriesland

Government
  - Mayor: Dieter Heisterkamp

Area
  - Total: 8.4 km^{2} (3.2 sq mi)
- Elevation: 0 m (0 ft)

Population (2025-12-31)
  - Total: 174
  - Density: 21/km^{2} (54/sq mi)
- Time zone: UTC+01:00 (CET)
  - Summer (DST): UTC+02:00 (CEST)
- Postal codes: 25836
- Dialling codes: 04862
- Vehicle registration: NF
- Website: www.amt-eiderstedt. kommunen. nordfriesland. city-map.de

Katharinenheerd (Danish: Katrineherd) is a municipality in the district of Nordfriesland, in Schleswig-Holstein, Germany.

== See also ==
- Eiderstedt Peninsula
