= Garding =

- Town
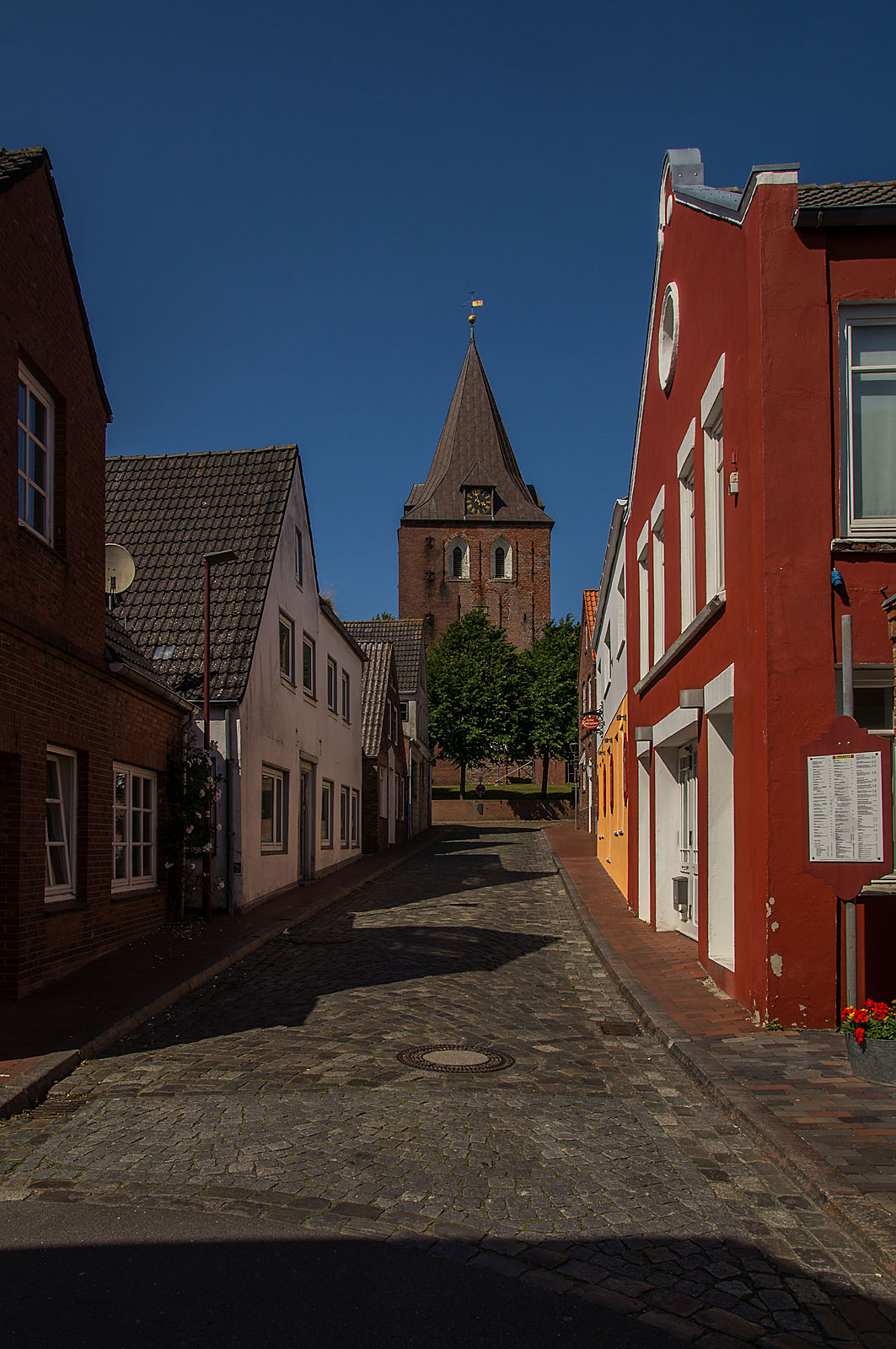

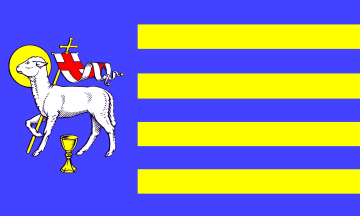
- Flag Coat of arms

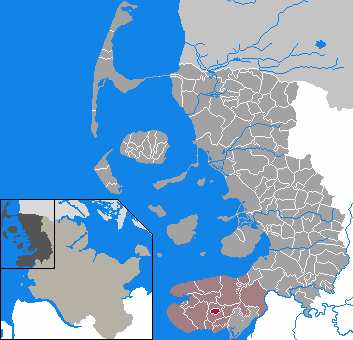
- Location of Garding within Nordfriesland district
- Interactive map of Garding
- Location within Germany Location within Schleswig-Holstein
- Coordinates: 54°19′50″N 8°46′50″E
- Country: Germany
- State: Schleswig-Holstein
- District: Nordfriesland

Government
  - Mayor: Andrea Kummerscheidt (CDU)

Area
  - Total: 3.06 km^{2} (1.18 sq mi)
- Elevation: 0 m (0 ft)

Population (2025-12-31)
  - Total: 2,882
  - Density: 942/km^{2} (2,440/sq mi)
- Time zone: UTC+01:00 (CET)
  - Summer (DST): UTC+02:00 (CEST)
- Postal codes: 25836
- Dialling codes: 04862
- Vehicle registration: NF
- Website: www.garding.de

Garding (German pronunciation: [ˈɡaʁdɪŋ]; Low German: Garn, Gaarn) is a town in the district of Nordfriesland, Schleswig-Holstein, Germany. It has a population of 2,700 (as of 2007). It is located in the Eiderstedt peninsula, and part of the Amt Eiderstedt.

== Notable people ==
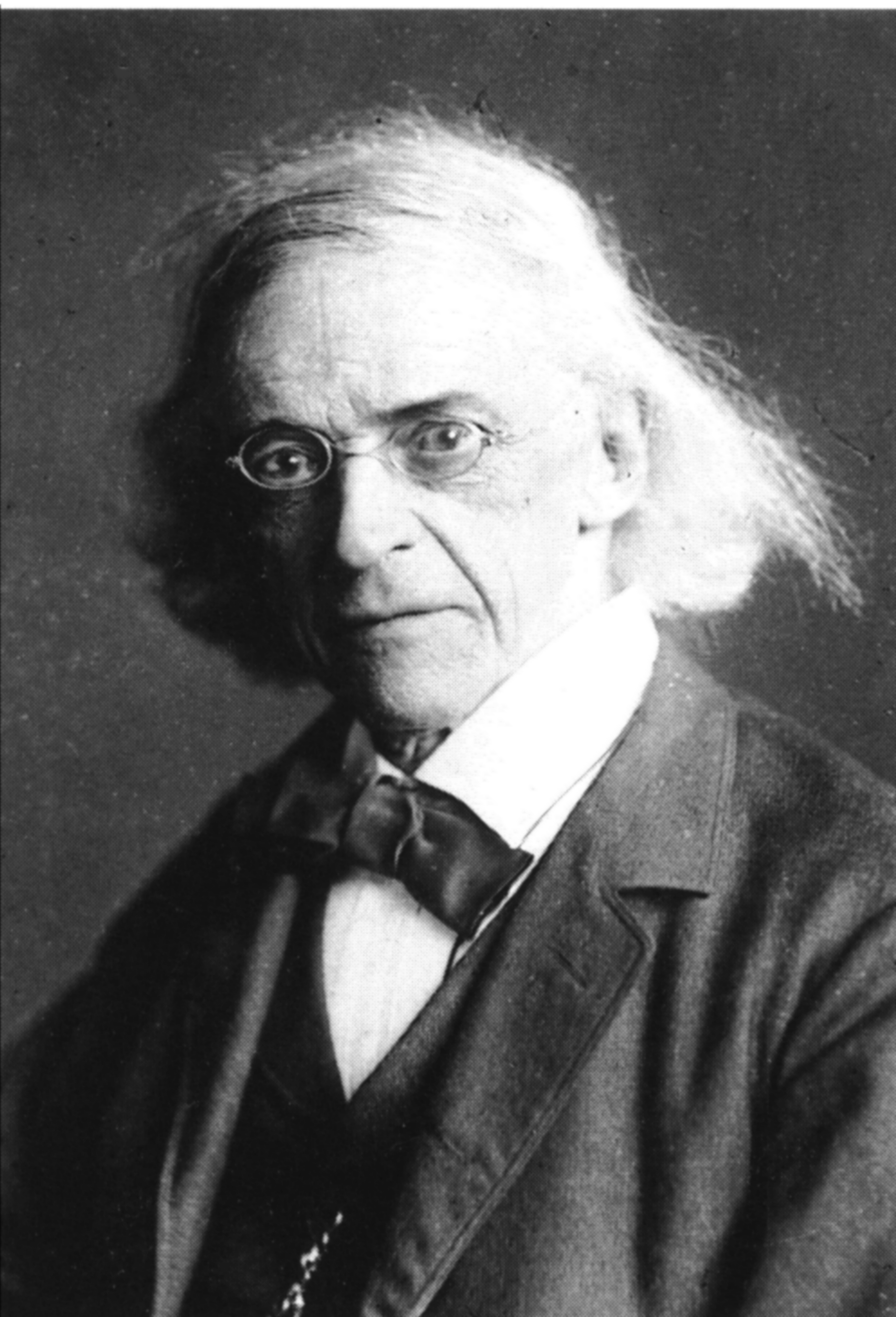
Theodor Mommsen

- Theodor Mommsen (1817-1903), historian, author and Nobel laureate from his historical books; since 1895, honorary citizen of the city of Garding (permanent exhibition in the town hall)
- Tycho Mommsen (1819-1900), writer and high school director
- Richard Petersen (1865-1946), engineer, technical manager for the construction of the Wuppertaler Schwebebahn
- Peter-Jürgen Boock (born 1951), writer and former member of the RAF

=== Connected with Garding ===
- Knut Kiesewetter (born 1941-2016), singer and musician, grew up in Garding.
- Otto Beckmann (born 1945), painter, draftsman and graphic artist, rebuilt the mill "Emanuel" in Garding since 1971.

== See also ==
- Eiderstedt peninsula
