= Sankt Peter-Ording =

- Municipality
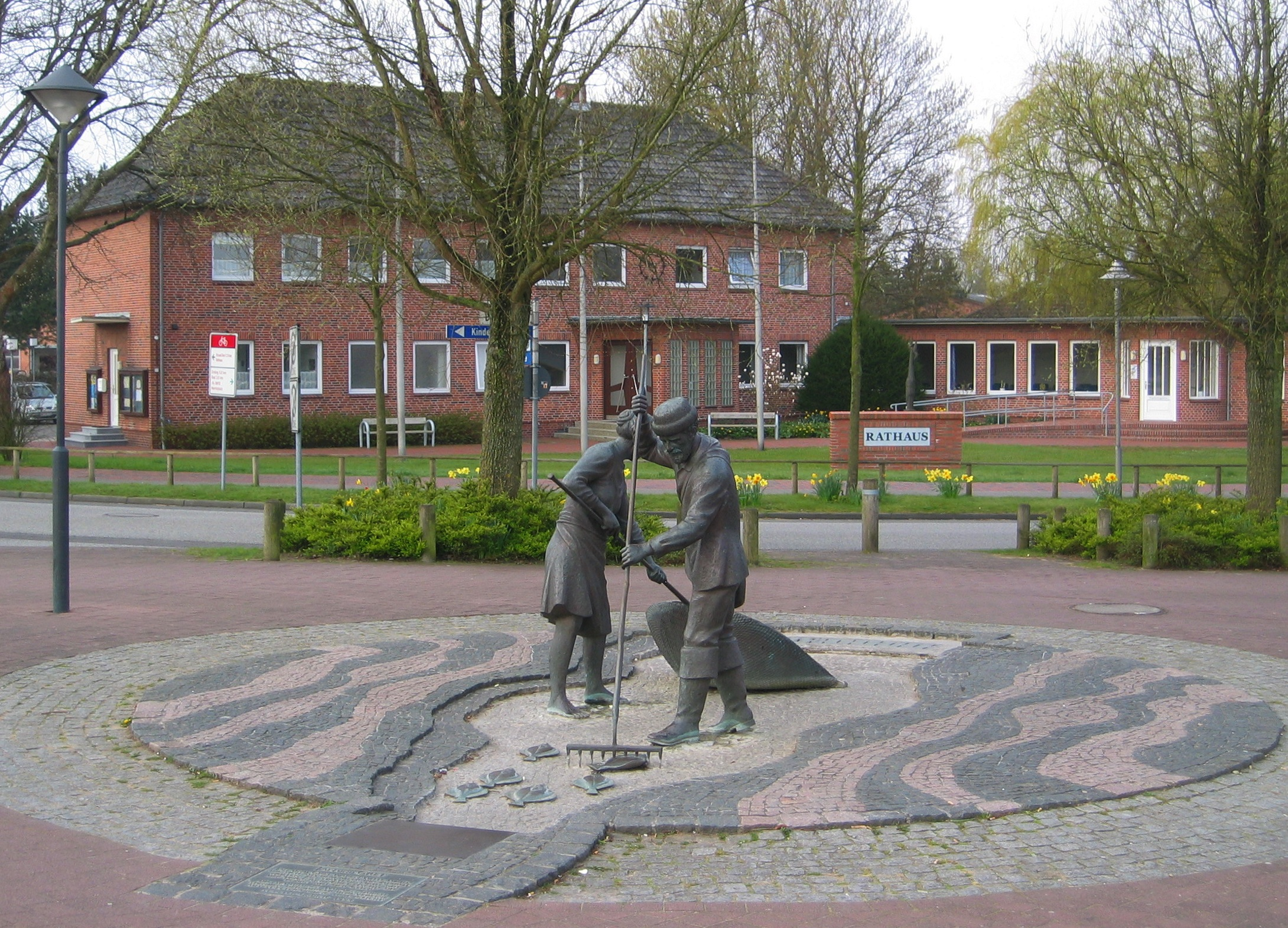
- The town hall with a sculpture Jan und Gret symbolising the hard work of coastal fishermen before the onset of tourism

- Flag Coat of arms

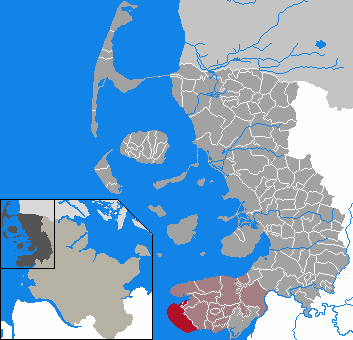
- Location of Sankt Peter-Ording within Nordfriesland district
- Interactive map of Sankt Peter-Ording
- Location within Germany Location within Schleswig-Holstein
- Coordinates: 54°18′15″N 8°39′4″E
- Country: Germany
- State: Schleswig-Holstein
- District: Nordfriesland

Government
  - Mayor: Rainer Balsmeier

Area
  - Total: 28.28 km^{2} (10.92 sq mi)
- Elevation: 3 m (9.8 ft)

Population (2025-12-31)
  - Total: 3,749
  - Density: 132.6/km^{2} (343.3/sq mi)
- Time zone: UTC+01:00 (CET)
  - Summer (DST): UTC+02:00 (CEST)
- Postal codes: 25826
- Dialling codes: 04863
- Vehicle registration: NF
- Website: www.sankt-peter-ording.de

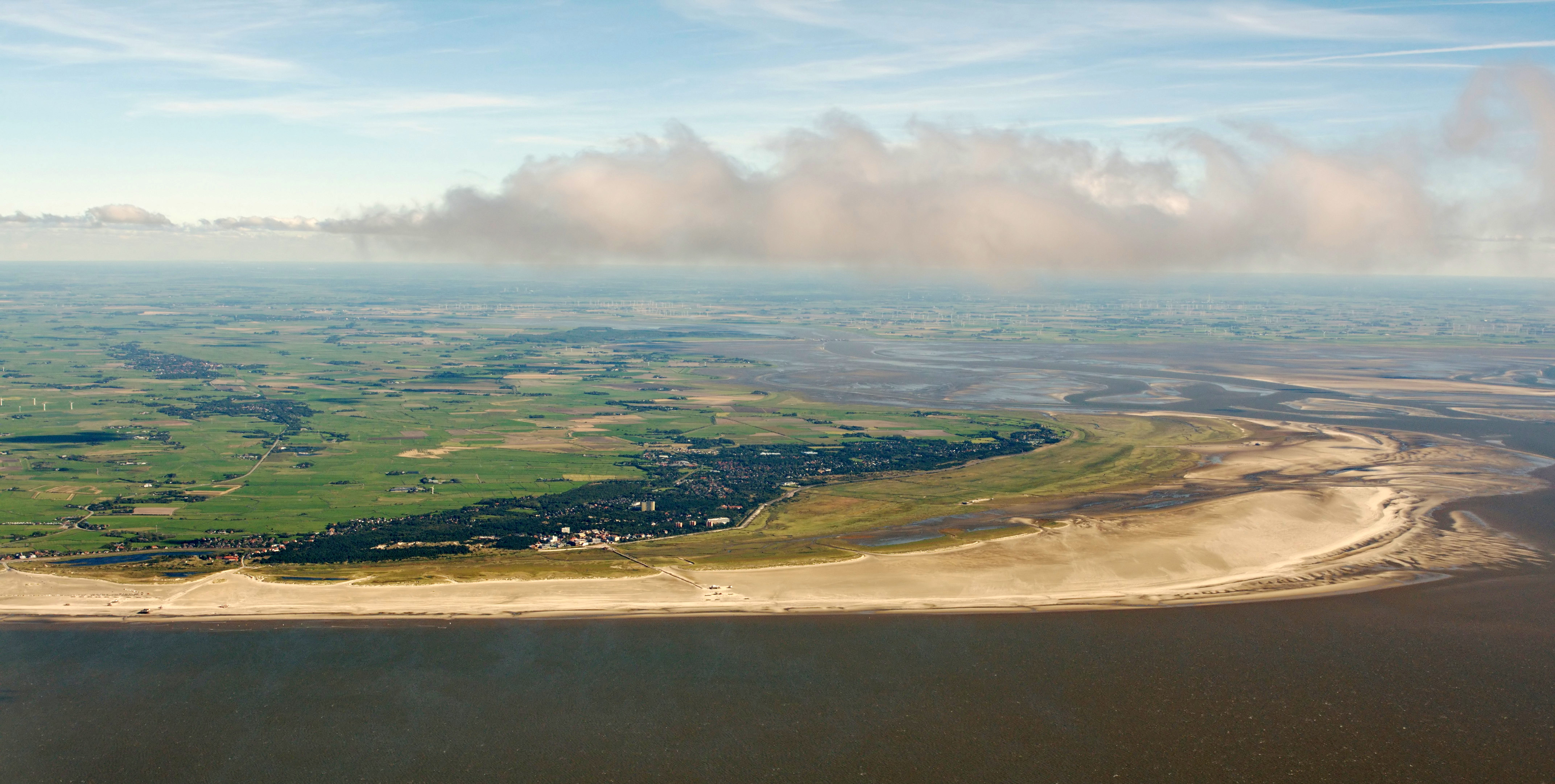
St. Peter-Ording

Sankt Peter-Ording (German pronunciation, also: Ulstrup-Ording) is a popular German seaside spa and a municipality in the district of Nordfriesland, in Schleswig-Holstein, Germany. It is the only German seaside resort that has a sulphur spring and thus terms itself "North Sea spa and sulphur spring". By overnight stays, St. Peter-Ording is the largest seaside resort and has the most overnight stays in the state of Schleswig-Holstein.

== Geography ==
St. Peter-Ording is situated on the North Sea coast, on the western tip of the Eiderstedt peninsula, approx. 45 km southwest of my Husum. Part of the municipality lies in the Schleswig-Holstein Wadden Sea National Park. Its characteristics include a beach that is approximately 12 kilometers long and up to one kilometre wide, the dunes, the salt meadows and the cultivated forested areas, are atypical for this region. The salt meadows are of special ecological importance, since they belong to the few salt meadows that remain in their natural state. In contrast to other salt meadows along the North Sea they contain numerous ponds and puddles. The landward side is flooded with sea water only occasionally and not every year, so that amphibians such as grass frogs, moor frogs and toads (Bufo bufo) live uncharacteristically close to the seashore. Even the Natterjack Toad (Bufo calamita) is able to reproduce successfully in this environment.

The normal range of the tides is up to three meters. In the intertidal mudflat walks the tidal calendar should always be consulted. That the beach is so flat and smooth has made it a popular site for sail-racing, a sport similar to wind-surfing but on wheels. There are several elevated walkways through the dunes giving access to the beach.

== Climate ==
As is typical of coastal regions, St. Peter-Ording has a maritime climate with mild winters and cool summers.

The local climate, especially the air on the dunes and beach, salt meadows and forest, in particular, contain high levels of aerosolized salts and iodine. In addition, the low allergen content ensures particularly clean air.

The spa is used extensively for thalassotherapy i.e. the medical use of sea air and water.

The municipality of Sankt Peter-Ording comprises five communities: Brösum and Norderdeich, Ording and Westmarken, Bad, Dorf and Wittendün, Süderhöft/Böhl.

Climate data for Sankt Peter-Ording (1991–2020 normals)
Month	Jan	Feb	Mar	Apr	May	Jun	Jul	Aug	Sep	Oct	Nov	Dec	Year
Mean daily maximum °C (°F)	3.8 (38.8)	4.1 (39.4)	7.2 (45.0)	12.2 (54.0)	16.1 (61.0)	18.9 (66.0)	21.4 (70.5)	21.5 (70.7)	18.1 (64.6)	13.1 (55.6)	8.2 (46.8)	5.1 (41.2)	12.5 (54.5)
Daily mean °C (°F)	2.2 (36.0)	2.2 (36.0)	4.3 (39.7)	8.2 (46.8)	12.1 (53.8)	15.3 (59.5)	17.7 (63.9)	17.9 (64.2)	14.8 (58.6)	10.4 (50.7)	6.2 (43.2)	3.4 (38.1)	9.6 (49.3)
Mean daily minimum °C (°F)	0.2 (32.4)	0.1 (32.2)	1.7 (35.1)	4.7 (40.5)	8.4 (47.1)	11.8 (53.2)	14.2 (57.6)	14.3 (57.7)	11.6 (52.9)	7.6 (45.7)	4.1 (39.4)	1.4 (34.5)	6.7 (44.1)
Average precipitation mm (inches)	70.8 (2.79)	51.3 (2.02)	49.2 (1.94)	38.7 (1.52)	44.6 (1.76)	68.4 (2.69)	74.8 (2.94)	94.2 (3.71)	85.1 (3.35)	97.0 (3.82)	78.0 (3.07)	82.1 (3.23)	834.2 (32.84)
Average precipitation days (≥ 1.0 mm)	19.0	16.4	15.2	12.6	12.8	13.8	15.2	16.4	16.3	18.4	19.5	20.5	196.2
Average snowy days (≥ 1.0 cm)	3.7	5.0	2.8	0	0	0	0	0	0	0	0.7	3.2	15.4
Average relative humidity (%)	89.8	88.0	84.7	78.4	75.6	76.2	76.4	76.8	80.6	84.7	88.6	90.1	82.5
Mean monthly sunshine hours	43.8	74.8	136.9	204.7	244.9	230.4	240.3	217.6	155.1	105.2	49.8	34.9	1,738.4
Source: World Meteorological Organization

== History ==
St. Peter-Ording is composed of several formerly separate districts. The earliest known documentary reference to the village of St. Peter, previously known as Ulstrup, dates from 1373; the name change occurred because Ulstrup had lost a lot of land to the North Sea. There is evidence of Viking settlements. Süderhöft/Bohl gave up its independence after the flood of 1553. The churches of St. Peter and Ording joined parishes in 1867. It was not until 1967 that they were merged into St. Peter-Ording. In 1970, the community became part of the district of North Friesland; it previously belonged to the district of Eiderstedt.

Because of the constant loss of sand, no harbour could be built and St. Peter-Ording never established a fishing industry. Even agriculture was not always successful, due to the salinity of the soil from flooding and silting.

Scavengers, termed Hitzlöper used to comb the strand looking for flotsam. Valuable items were often hidden in order to avoid paying duty.

The wandering dunes created ongoing problems for the residents. Thus, Ording twice had to abandon its church after the parishioners had had to shovel their way to church over decades. The planting of permanent vegetation started 1860, at the direction of the Danish king, who reign over the area until 1864; Denmark's border was the nearby Eider River. In 1867 St. Peter became part of Prussia.

St. Peter-Ording's importance as a beach resort dates from 1877, when the first hotel was built. In 1913 the first sanatorium was built. In 1953 a strong iodine spring was found and more curative facilities were built. In 1958 the state recognized St.Peter-Ording as a North Sea spa and sulphur spring.

The first of the characteristic stilt houses on the beach was built in 1911 and called itself "Giftbude" because, in the local dialect, "es dort wat gift" - "there's something available there", which, to insiders, meant Cognac.

Transportation to St. Peter-Ording was gradually improved. In 1926 the first pier was built on Ording beach, in 1932, the Husum–Bad St. Peter-Ording railway was extended from Garding. Improved road access has been made possible by the construction of the Eidersperrwerk, a sea barrier on the Eider River.

St. Peter-Ording was used in several film and television productions, including "Jan Delay - Somehow, Someday, Somewhere," "Against the Wind" and "Now or Never".

== See also ==
- Eiderstedt peninsula
