= Eiderstedt =

Peninsula in Germany

Coordinates: 54°21′N 8°50′E

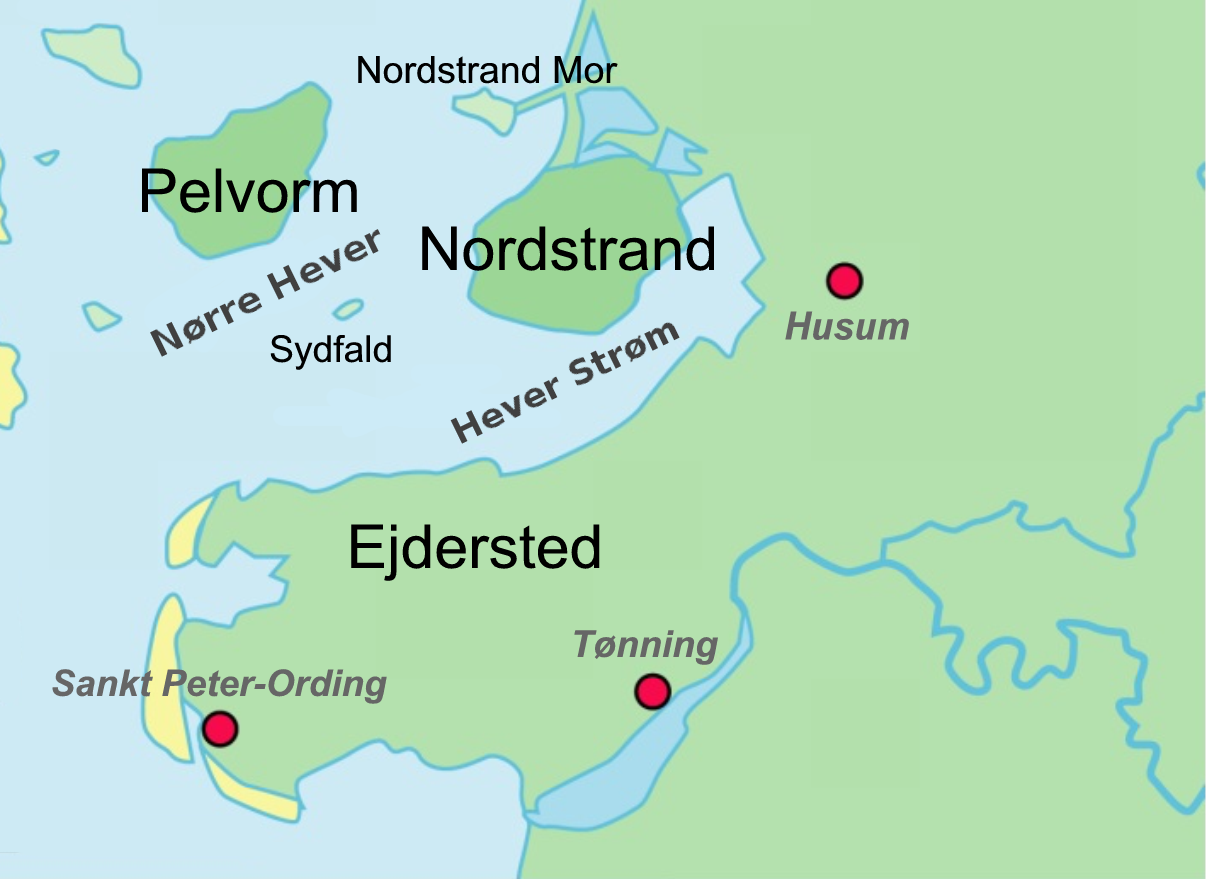
Map of the Eiderstedt Peninsula

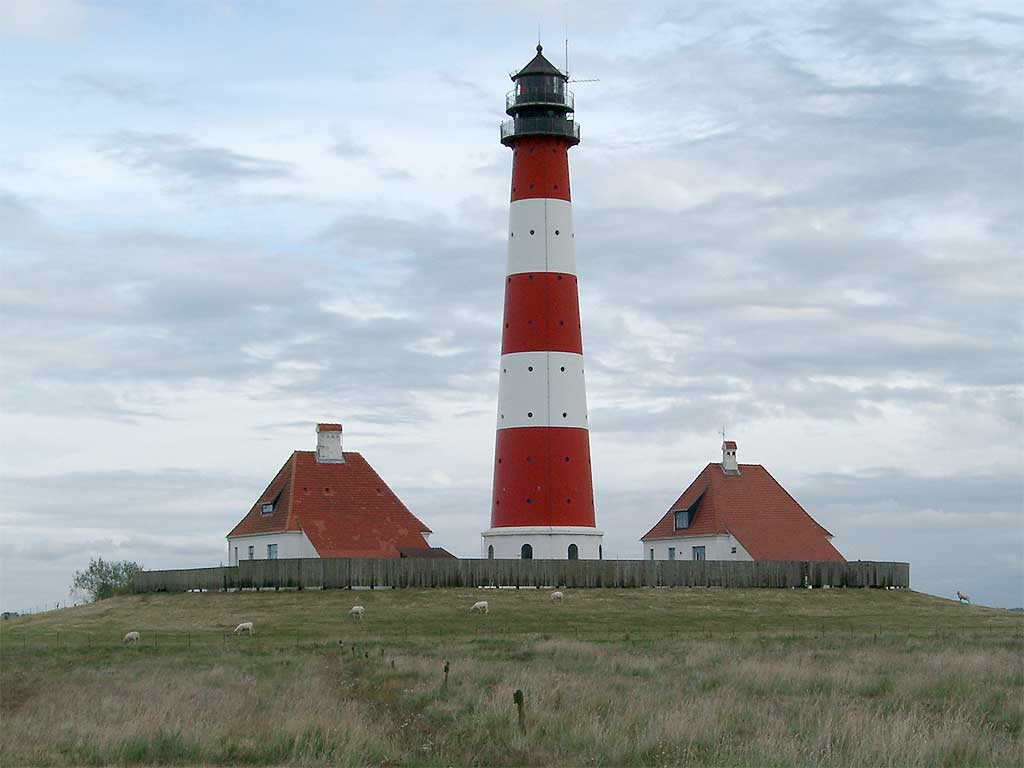
Lighthouse in Westerhever

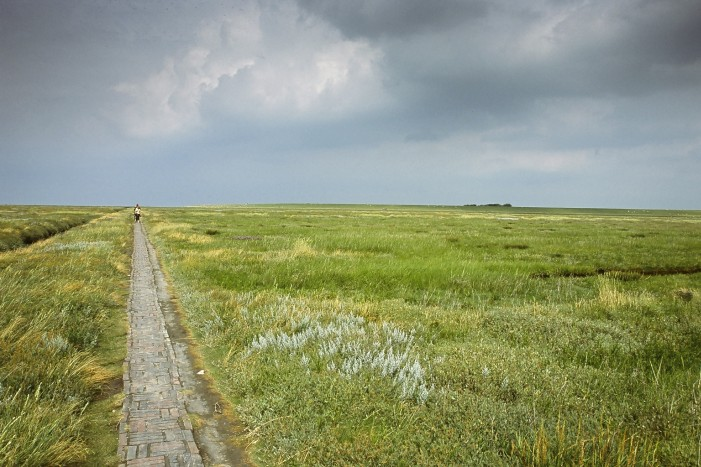
View of a marshland

Eiderstedt (German: Eiderstedt, pronounced [ˈaɪdɐʃtɛt]; Danish: Ejdersted; North Frisian: Ääderstää) is a peninsula in the district of Nordfriesland in the German federal state of Schleswig-Holstein.

== Overview ==
It is approximately 30 km in length and 15 km in width and has been created through diking (polders) from three islands: Eiderstedt around Tönning, Utholm around Tating, and Evershop around Garding. The diking started around the year 1000 AD.

Since these three islands were administrative districts of their own, the area was originally called Dreilande - "Three Lands".

Alluvial soil won from the North Sea makes the area well-suited for agriculture. At present, tourism dominates, particularly in the town of Sankt Peter-Ording on the peninsula's western tip. The Westerhever lighthouse is the peninsula's main emblem and the most prominent lighthouse in Germany. The Wadden Sea, the Eider Barrage on the Eider River and the Katinger Watt, marshlands won from the sea in the process of the construction of the Eidersperrwerk, are other tourist attractions on the peninsula.

== History ==
The constant threat of the sea overcoming their habitations forced Eiderstedt to a special form of self-administration at a very early stage as diking was possible only through strong cooperation. Originally settled by Frisians, Eiderstedt was part of the Duchy of Schleswig from the 14th century on.

In 1864, the Danish Duchy of Schleswig became part of Prussia. Prussian administration gave Eiderstedt independence as a district. In 1970, the district of Eiderstedt was merged with the districts of Husum and Südtondern to form the district of Nordfriesland.

== Amt Eiderstedt ==
The peninsula represents also a same named Amt, with the administrative seat in the town of Garding. The only town of the peninsula not part of the Amt is Tönning.
