= Bredstedt-Land =

Coordinates: 54°36′N 8°58′E

- Former Amt
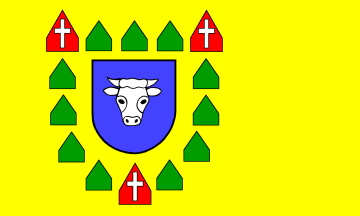
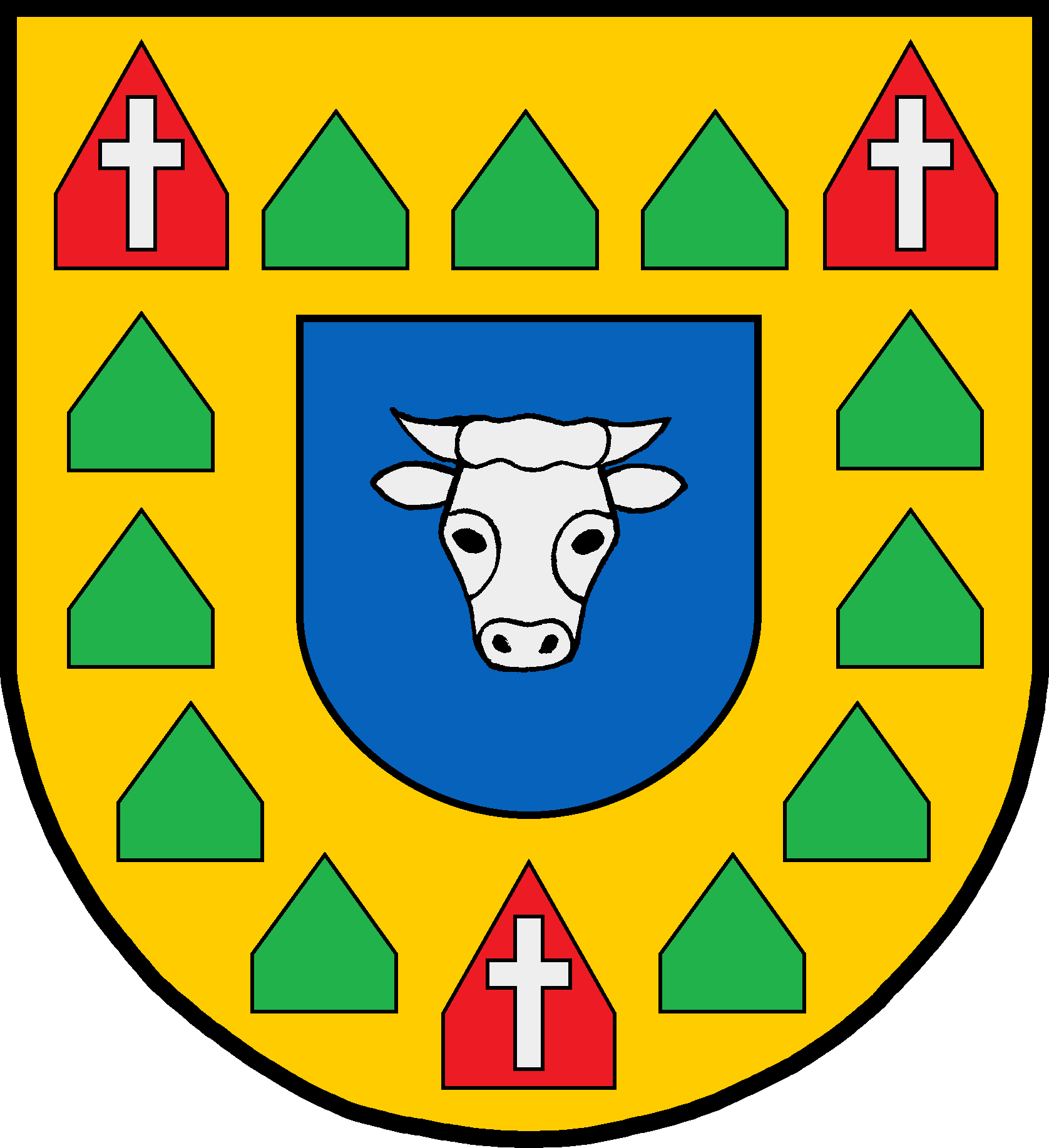
- Flag Coat of arms

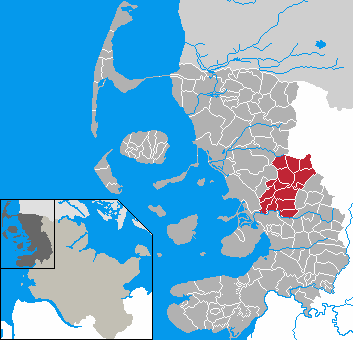
- Map of Nordfriesland highlighting Bredstedt-Land
- Country: Germany
- State: Schleswig-Holstein
- District: Nordfriesland
- Disestablished: 1 April 2008
- Region seat: Breklum

Area
  - Total: 145 km^{2} (56 sq mi)

Bredstedt-Land was an Amt ("collective municipality") in the district of Nordfriesland, in Schleswig-Holstein, Germany. It was situated east of Bredstedt, approx. 15 km north of Husum. Its seat was in Breklum.

In April 2008, it was merged with the Amt Stollberg and the town Bredstedt to form the Amt Mittleres Nordfriesland.

The Amt Bredstedt-Land consisted of the following municipalities (population in 2005 between brackets):

- Ahrenshöft (511)
- Almdorf (533)
- Bohmstedt (755)
- Breklum * (2.325)
- Drelsdorf (1.281)
- Goldebek (353)
- Goldelund (394)
- Högel (470)
- Joldelund (732)
- Kolkerheide (68)
- Lütjenholm (337)
- Sönnebüll (234)
- Struckum (990)
- Vollstedt (165)
