= Stollberg (Amt) =

Coordinates: 54°40′N 8°55′E

- Former Amt
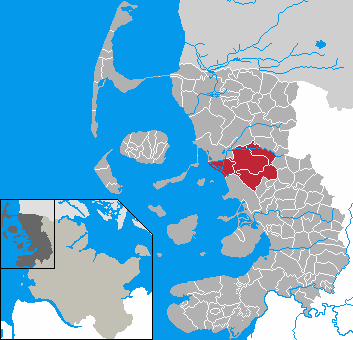
- Map of Nordfriesland highlighting Stollberg
- Country: Germany
- State: Schleswig-Holstein
- District: Nordfriesland
- Disestablished: 1 April 2008
- Region seat: Langenhorn

Area
  - Total: 120 km^{2} (46 sq mi)

Stollberg was an Amt ("collective municipality") in the district of Nordfriesland in Schleswig-Holstein, Germany. It was situated on the North Sea coast, approximately 25 km northwest of Husum. Stollberg was named after the hill Stollberg, at 44m above sea level the highest in Nordfriesland. Its seat was in Langenhorn.

In April 2008, Stollberg was merged with the Amt Bredstedt-Land and the town Bredstedt to form the Amt Mittleres Nordfriesland.

The Amt Stollberg consisted of the following municipalities (with 2005 population in brackets):

- Bargum (608)
- Bordelum (1,991)
- Langenhorn (3,092)
- Ockholm (372)
