= Hamburger Hallig =

Hamburger Hallig Hamborjer Håli / Hamborg hallig
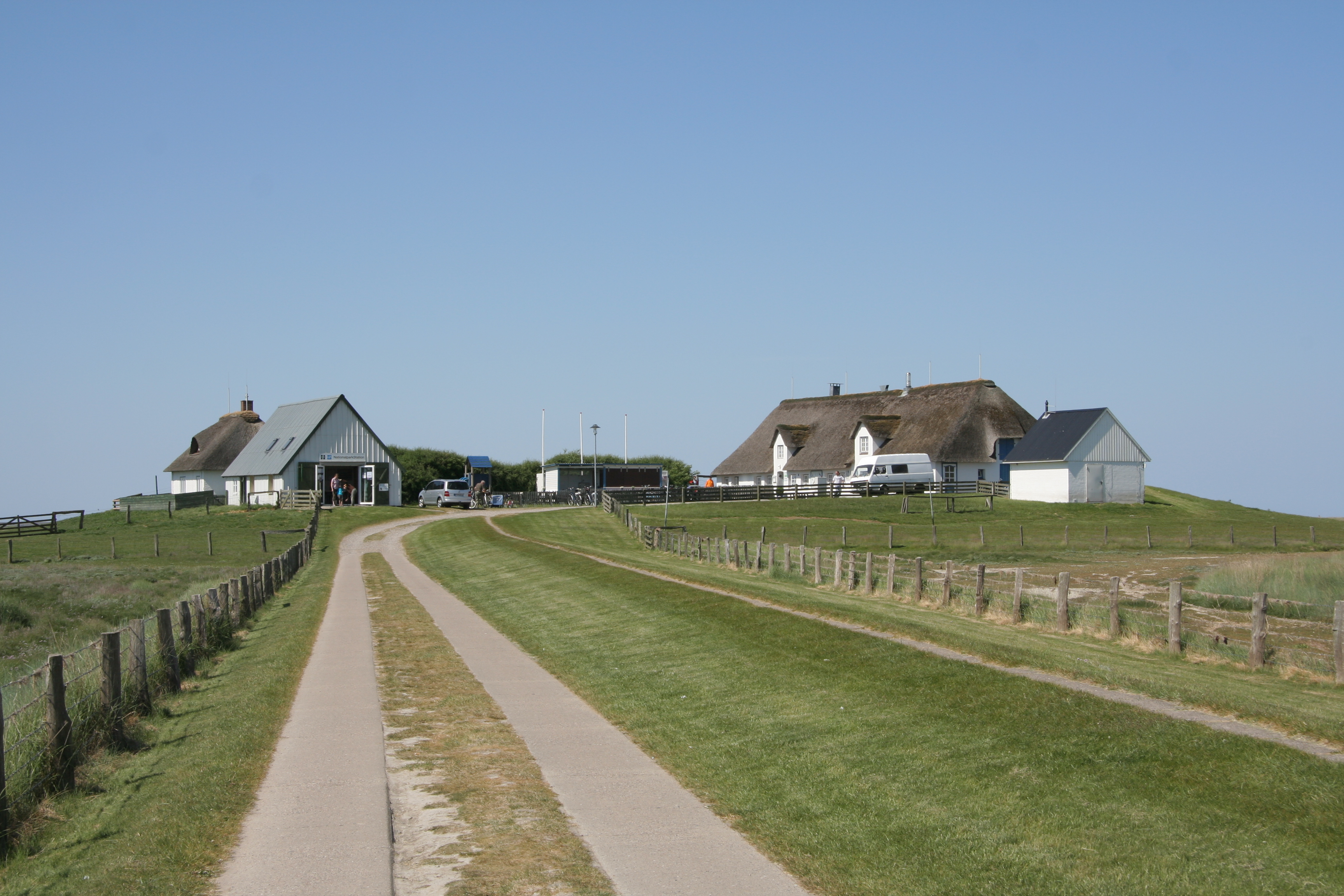
- The main dwelling hill at Hamburger Hallig

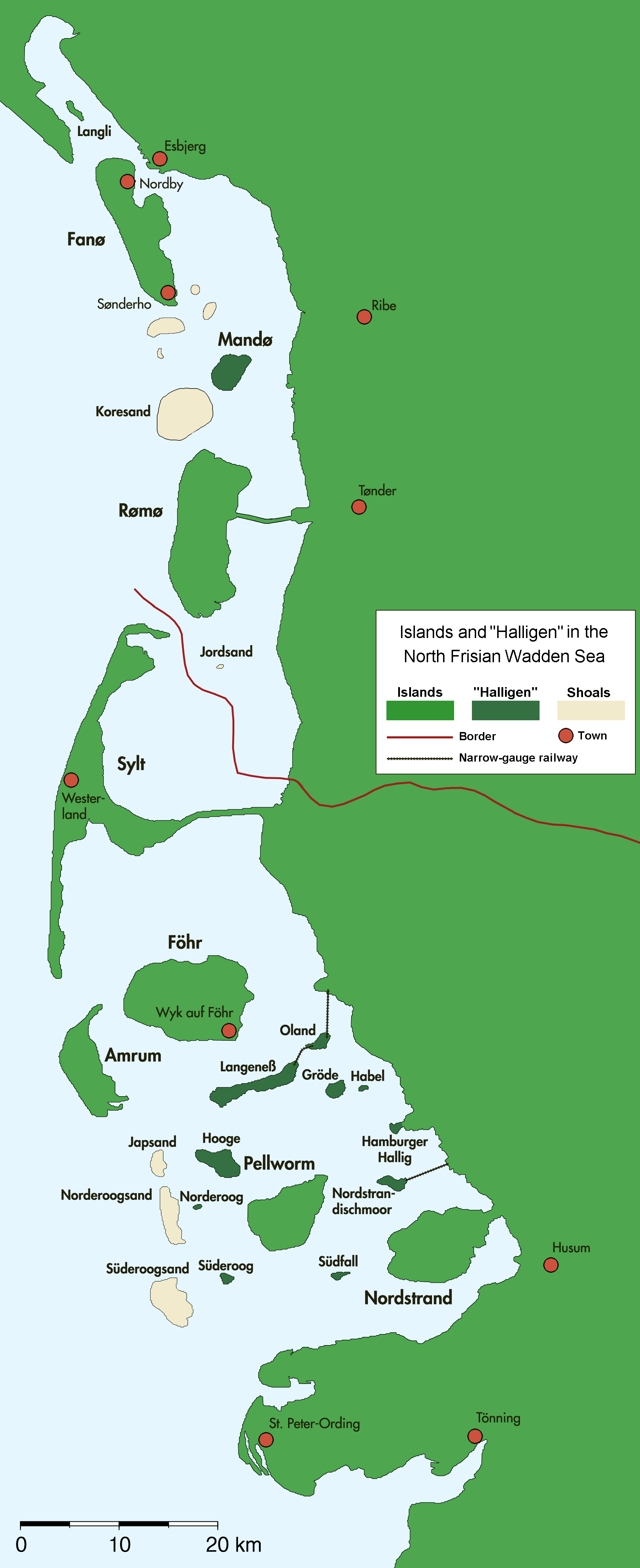
- Map of the North Frisian and the Danish Wadden Sea Islands

Geography
- Location: Nordfriesland, Germany
- Coordinates: 54°35′58″N 8°49′8″E
- Archipelago: North Frisian Islands
- Adjacent to: Wadden Sea, German Bight
- Area: 1.1 km^{2} (0.42 sq mi)
- Length: 4 km (2.5 mi)
- Width: 2 km (1.2 mi)

Administration
- Germany
- State: Schleswig-Holstein
- District: Nordfriesland
- Municipality: Reußenköge

Hamburger Hallig (German pronunciation: [ˈhambʊʁɡɐ ˈhalɪç]; Danish: Hamborg hallig, North Frisian: Hamborjer Håli) is an area on the westcoast of Nordfriesland district in Schleswig-Holstein, Germany, that is not protected by sea dikes. It is therefore counted among the Halligen islands.

== History ==
The island was named after two merchants from Hamburg, the brothers Rudolf and Arnold Amsinck. They were granted a privilege to purchase and maintain land in the northeastern area of Strand island, where they constructed dikes in the years 1624 to 1628. The newly secured land was called the Amsinck polder. However, the Burchardi Flood of 1634 destroyed the dikes, leaving only one artificial dwelling hill with "Hamburger Haus" [Hamburg house] on it intact. Afterwards the dikes were restored at high financial costs. In 1661, the house was torn down and replaced by a smaller building. In 1711, the island had again become an undiked Hallig. It remained property of the Amsick family until 1760.

The name "Hamburger Hallig" was first recorded in 1781. The house on the island was eventually destroyed in the February flood of 1825.

In 1855 a causeway was planned to connect the island with mainland North Frisia. It was built in 1859/60 but it broke already in 1860. In 1866/7, a fascine dam was constructed between the Bordelum sluice and Hamburger Hallig. This dam was paved in 1874 and got a spillover vent, which was removed though in 1875. The interruption of tidal current by the causeway led to a considerable increase in sedimentation on both side of the dam. The experience gained from the construction of the Hamburger Hallig dam became influential for the further development of land reclamation in North Frisia. In 1878, the fiscal authority purchased the Hallig and leased it to local farmers. In 1880, an artesian well was constructed on the island, and the causeway became traversable in 1901.

In 1908, the area of Hamburger Hallig measured 96 hectares (240 acres). Growing steadily, it amounted to 216 hectares (530 acres) on 16 April 1930. On this day, Hamburger Hallig was declared a nature reserve to protect the local populations of pied avocets. Today, Hamburger Hallig, together with the floodplains and salt marshes off the Sönke-Nissen-Koog polder, encompasses an area of roughly 1,000 hectares (2,500 acres) and is maintained by Naturschutzbund Deutschland (NABU).

== Geography ==
Strictly speaking, Hamburger Hallig is no longer an island because it has been connected to the mainland by the causeway. Today, it adjoins to the floodplains off Sönke-Nissen-Koog, and like the latter it is part of the Reußenköge municipality. Until 1899 though, Hamburger Hallig was administered as an unincorporated estate. Modern coastal management protects the west coast of Hamburger Hallig from further erosion.

== Artificial hills ==
Today, there are three artificial hills (German: Warft) on Hamburger Hallig including one hill on the floodplains and one without buildings.

=== Main Warft ===
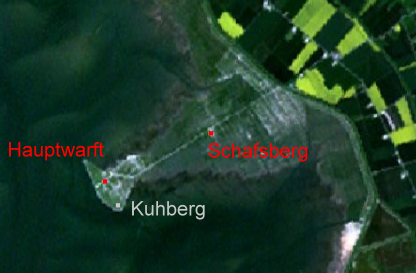
Hamburger Hallig with salt marshes and artificial hills

The main Warft is located four kilometres west off the sea dike of Sönke-Nissen-Koog. It does not have a proper name. On it, there are three buildings:

- The Hallig Krog inn that is open to visitors from Easter to 31 October,
- an outpost of the National Park Service (NPS),
- Watt-Werkstatt, the Wadden Workshop of the NPS.

=== Kuhberg ===
Kuhberg, the "cow hill", is located 300 m south of the main Warft. It is a flat hill without buildings that serves as refuge for cattle and sheep during light floodings of the island.

=== Schafsberg ===
"Sheep's hill" is a hill two kilometres west off the mainland, halfways between Hamburger Hallig and the mainland. Located on the salt marshes, it serves as an information post for NABU. Throughout the year, the lodge at Claus-Jürgen Reitmann-Haus is only temporarily used by voluntary NABU wardens.

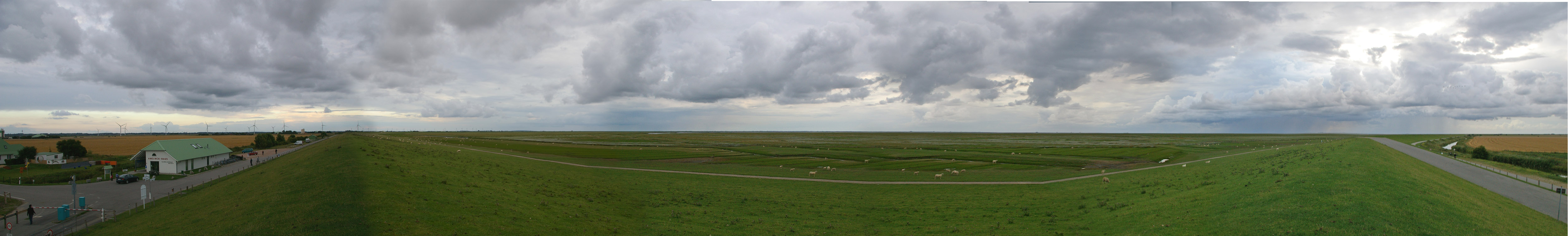
Panoramic view from the Amsinck-Haus at Hamburger Hallig
