= Langenhorn =

Langenhorn may refer to:

- Langenhorn, Hamburg, a quarter of Hamburg, Germany
- Langenhorn (Nordfriesland), a municipality in Schleswig-Holstein, Germany
