= Reußenköge =

Reußenköge Reussenkog
- Municipality
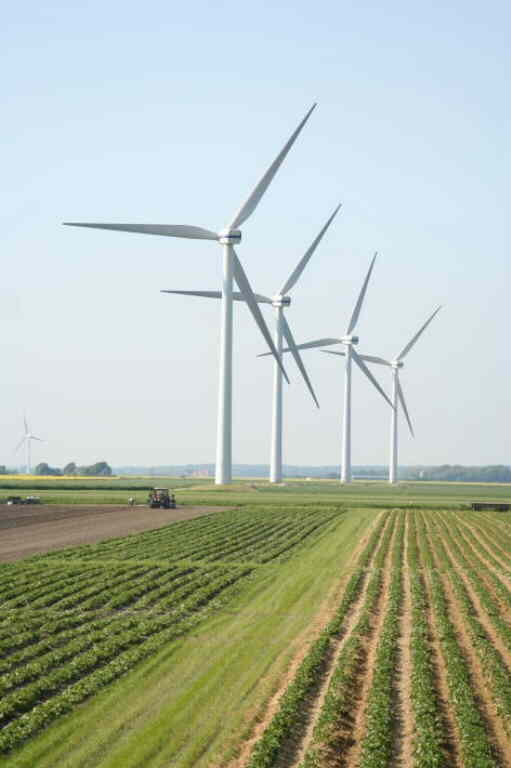
- A wind farm in the Desmerciereskoog polder

- Coat of arms

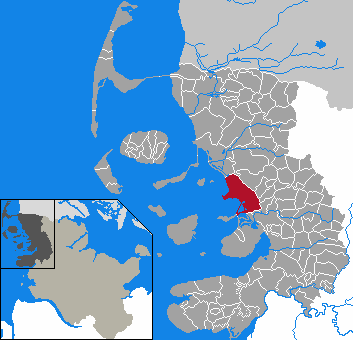
- Location of Reußenköge; Reussenkog within Nordfriesland district
- Interactive map of Reußenköge; Reussenkog
- Location within Germany Location within Schleswig-Holstein
- Coordinates: 54°36′33″N 8°54′16″E
- Country: Germany
- State: Schleswig-Holstein
- District: Nordfriesland

Government
  - Mayor: Dirk Albrecht

Area
  - Total: 45.91 km^{2} (17.73 sq mi)
- Elevation: 1 m (3.3 ft)

Population (2025-12-31)
  - Total: 298
  - Density: 6.49/km^{2} (16.8/sq mi)
- Time zone: UTC+01:00 (CET)
  - Summer (DST): UTC+02:00 (CEST)
- Postal codes: 25821
- Dialling codes: 04671, 04674, 04842
- Vehicle registration: NF
- Website: www.reussenkoege.de

Reußenköge (German pronunciation: [ʁɔʏsn̩ˈkøːɡə]; Danish: Reussenkog) is a sparsely populated municipality in the district of Nordfriesland, in Schleswig-Holstein, Germany. It is situated directly adjacent the shoreline of the North Sea coast, in a driving distance of in between 15 up to 29 km northwest of the county-capital city of Husum.

The municipality includes a number of six populated polders (German: Koog, plural: Köge), two of which were financed by Count Heinrich XLIII of Reuß-Schleiz-Köstritz and his wife Louise and thus bear the names Louisen-Reußen-Koog (const. 1799) and Reußenkoog (1789). Additional polders are:

- Sophien-Magdalenen-Koog (const. 1742)
- Desmerciereskoog (1767)
- Cecilienkoog (1905)
- Sönke-Nissen-Koog (1926)
- Beltringharder Koog (only unsettled northern part) (1987)

The name of the municipality was created by combining both the first names, meaning literally in English: polders of the Reußes. A further non-residential location within the municipality is the Hamburger Hallig. In former times being a settled part of the island of Alt-Nordstrand, it was split up from the rest by the Burchardi Flood in the year 1634.
