= Jens Mungard =

Frisian writer (1885–1940)

Jens Emil Mungard
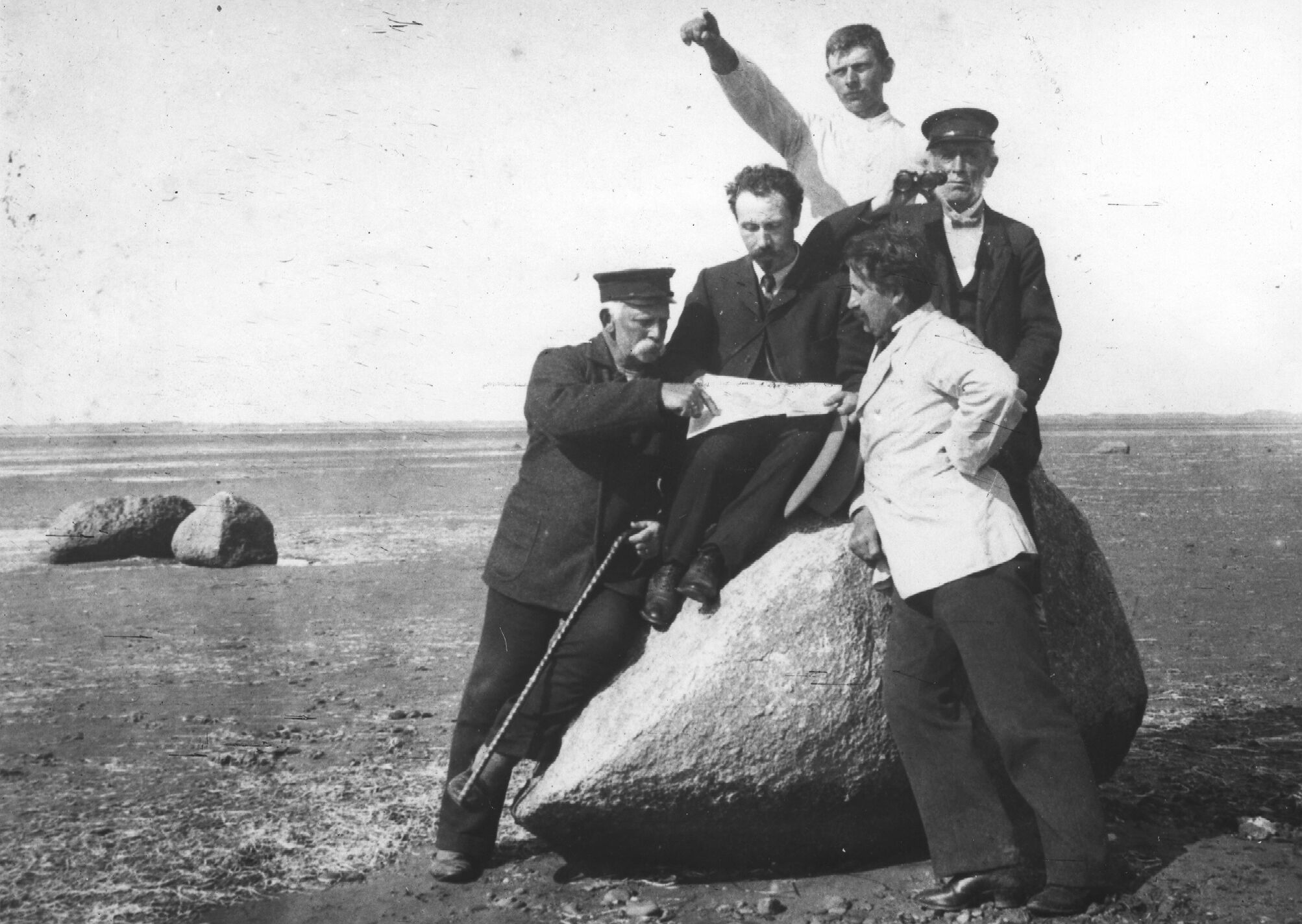
- On Sylt beach 1908, with (left to right) Nann Mungard, Pieter Sipma, Jens Mungard, Erich Johannsen and Paul Dirks
- Born: 9 February 1885; Keitum, Sylt
- Died: 13 February 1940; Sachsenhausen concentration camp
- Occupations: Poet; scholar
- Notable work: Ströntistel es min bloom

Jens Emil Mungard (9 February 1885 – 13 February 1940) was a Frisian poet and linguist regarded as one of the most significant literary figures in North Frisian. He wrote over 700 poems, in mostly Sylt North Frisian. He died in the Sachsenhausen concentration camp where he was imprisoned by the Nazi regime.

== Life ==
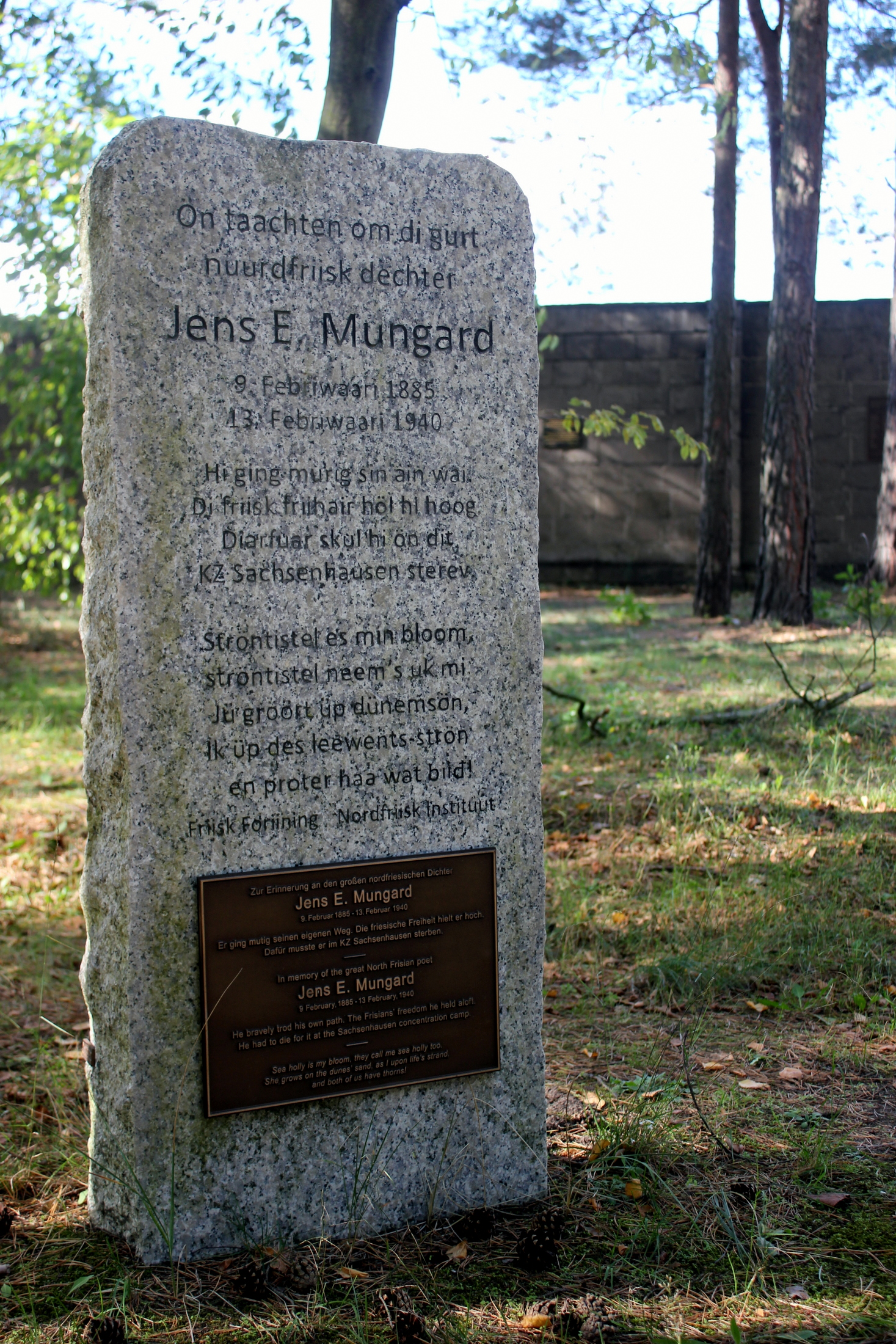
Monument for Mungard in Sachsenhausen

Mungard was born in Keitum to a family of pro-Danish farmers. His father was the Frisian linguist Nann Mungard whose family came from Rejsby, while his mother was from a local family of Captains. From 1891 to 1900, Mungard went to the local school before receiving an agricultural education in Bredstedt as his father wanted him to take over the farm. After his studies, he went to Rendsburg to serve in the field artillery as part of his compulsory military service. By the time Mungard took over the farm in 1909, he had already begun writing poems in Frisian and, along with his father, maintained close contact with West Frisian leaders and linguists from the Netherlands. During the 1920 Schleswig plebiscites, Nann Mungard actively campaigned for the Danish side, urging Sylt locals to vote for unification with Denmark. This led to tensions with pro-German Frisians who saw the Mungard family as traitors and spies. Around ten months after the vote, the Mungard farm was burnt down prompting Nan Mungard to leave Keitum for Møgeltønder, while Jens Mungard stayed in Keitum, collected an insurance payout, and later moved to Tönning in 1924 before settling in Archsum in 1925.

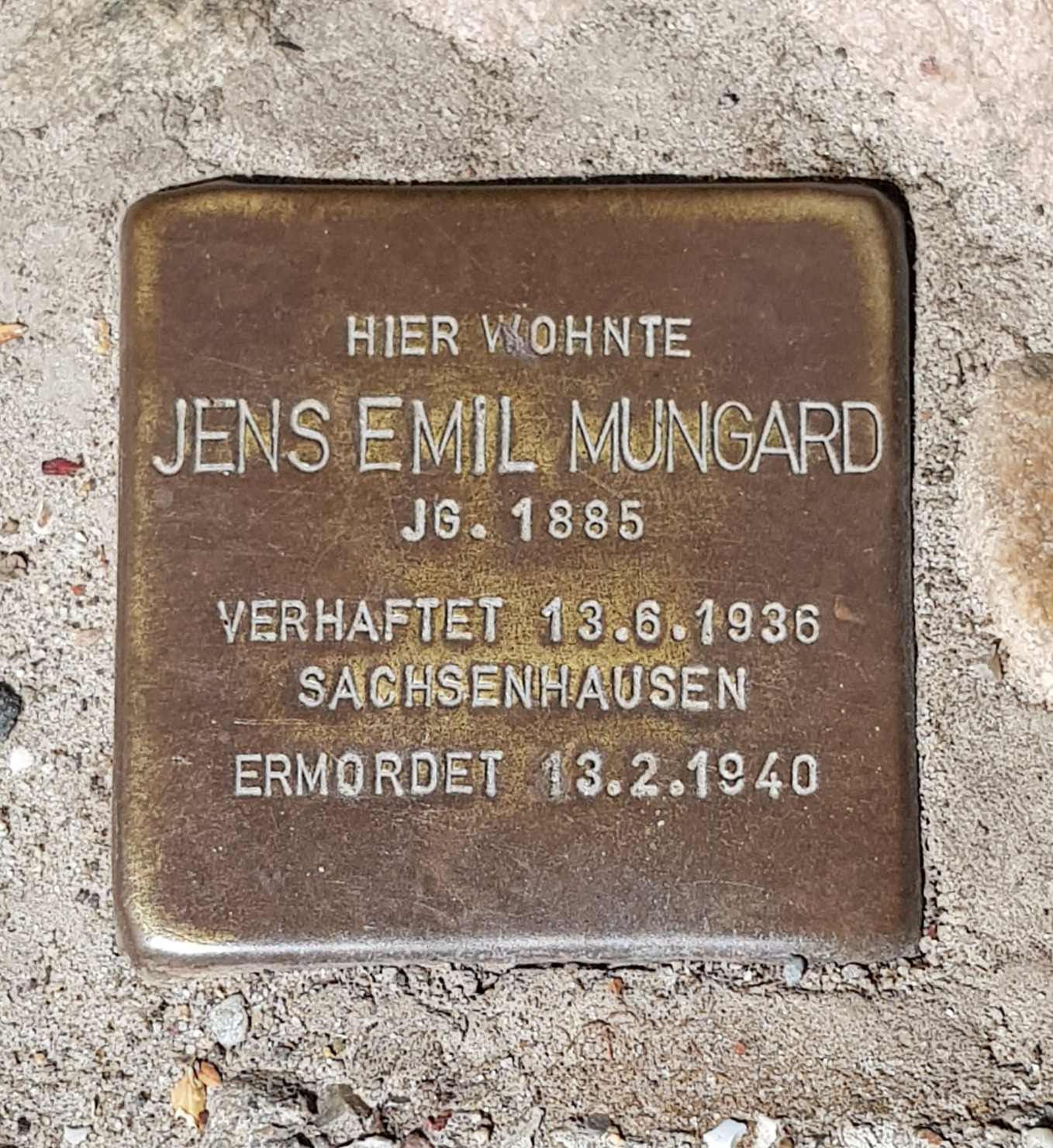
Stolperstein in memory of Jens Mungard (Sylt)

Jens Mungard found himself at odds with the Nazi regime soon after it seized power in 1933. While it is uncertain why he was instantly labeled an enemy, a few plausible reasons stand out. Locals in Sylt likely recalled the support of his family for Denmark in the 1920 vote, with the memory of their farm burning down still vivid. This, paired with his prior conflicts with authorities in Tönning and Archsum, likely made local Nazi officials see him as a risk. Furthermore, the Nazi distrust of artists who did not fully embrace its principles cast suspicion on his decision to write in the little-known Frisian language. However other Frisian authors escaped similar scrutiny, indicating this was not the only factor behind his targeting. On 13 June 1936, Jens Mungard was taken into protective custody by the Nazi regime and the arrest order stated that his past conduct raised suspicions he would harm Germany in the future. On 21 August 1936, he was found guilty on the grounds of suspected escape planning. By mid-1938, the Reich Chamber of Culture banned him from writing political texts. In December of that same year, Gestapo moved him to Flensburg before transferring him to the Sachsenhausen concentration camp. Mungard died there on 13 February 1940 of pneumonia.

Most of his political writings were published posthumously.

== Works ==
List of works by Mungard published:

- "Strön'–Tistel". Fuar Söl'ring Lir. 7/8. 1930.
- "Di Mensk sin Dön es ārichst". Fuar Söl'ring Lir. 7. 1959.
- "Sen wü jit deling Söl'ring". Fuar Söl'ring Lir. 7/8. 1962.
- "Hat bleft sa". Fuar Söl'ring Lir. 1. 1965.
- "Min noom". Fuar Söl'ring Lir. 3. 1965.
- "Dünem-Storem". Fuar Söl'ring Lir. 2. 1967.
- "Sne". Fuar Söl'ring Lir. 9. 1969.
- Strön'auktion ön blisem, Bredstedt: Nordfriisk Instituut, 1974
- Hoeg, Hans, ed. (1985). Fuar di min hart heer slain. Sölring steken en som breewer. Bredstedt: Nordfriisk Instituut.
- Hoeg, Hans, ed. (1995). Ströntistel en Dünemruusen. Amrum: Quedens.
- Gedichte | Dechtings. Bredstedt: Nordfriisk Instituut. 2013.
