= Mittleres Nordfriesland =

- Amt
- Logo

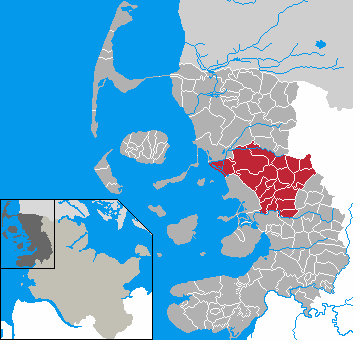
- Map of Nordfriesland highlighting Mittleres Nordfriesland
- Interactive map of Mittleres Nordfriesland
- Location within Germany Location within Schleswig-Holstein
- Coordinates: 54°37′N 8°58′E
- Country: Germany
- State: Schleswig-Holstein
- District: Nordfriesland
- Founded: 2008
- Seat: Bredstedt
- Subdivisions: 19 municipalities

Government
  - Mayor: Olde Oldsen

Area
  - Total: 273.2 km^{2} (105.5 sq mi)

Population (2025-12-31)
  - Total: 21,774
  - Density: 79.70/km^{2} (206.4/sq mi)
- Time zone: UTC+01:00 (CET)
  - Summer (DST): UTC+02:00 (CEST)
- Website: amnf.de

Mittleres Nordfriesland is an Amt ("collective municipality") in the district of Nordfriesland, in Schleswig-Holstein, Germany. Its seat is in Bredstedt. It was formed on 1 April 2008 from the former Ämter Bredstedt-Land and Stollberg, and the town Bredstedt.

The Amt Mittleres Nordfriesland consists of the following municipalities:

1. Ahrenshöft
2. Almdorf
3. Bargum
4. Bohmstedt
5. Bordelum
6. Bredstedt
7. Breklum
8. Drelsdorf
9. Goldebek
10. Goldelund
11. Högel
12. Joldelund
13. Kolkerheide
14. Langenhorn
15. Lütjenholm
16. Ockholm
17. Sönnebüll
18. Struckum
19. Vollstedt
