= Berthold Otto =

German educator (1859–1933)

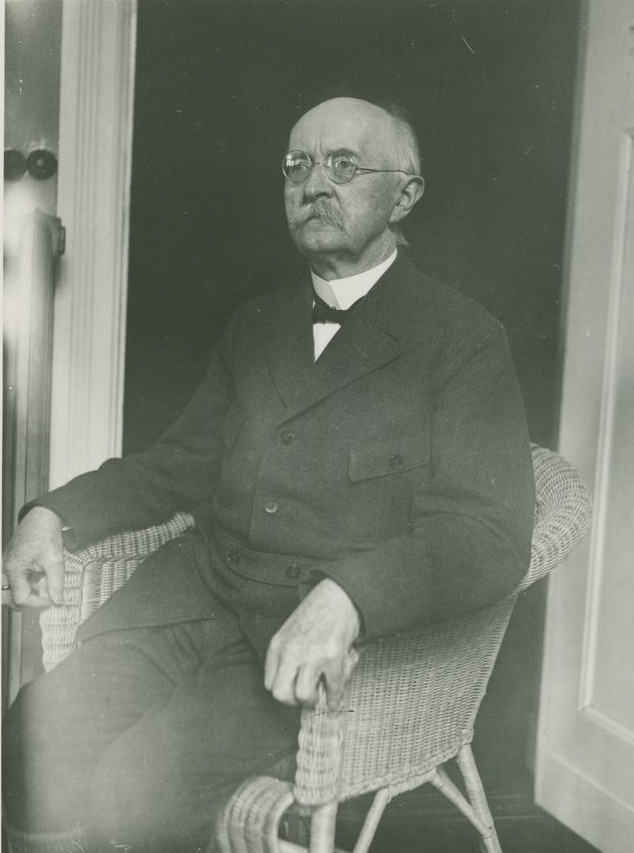
Otto in 1929

Berthold Otto (6 August 1859 – 29 June 1933) was a German educator and pedagogue who specialized in children's education. He founded a home school in Berlin-Lichterfelde in 1906 originally called the Hauslehrerschule which is now named after him. He believed in the individuality of children and the idea that every child was a genius until the age of six. He also founded a periodical called Der Hauslehrer.

== Life and work ==
Otto was born to Richard and Franziska née Wegener in Bienowitz (Silesia) and grew up in Rendsburg and Schleswig. He went to the Kiel Universityl in 1880 and studied philosophy, pedagogy, politics, and economics, completing his studies at the University of Berlin in 1883. He sought to study liberalism under Friedrich Paulsen for a doctorate, but Paulsen did not accept the topic, so he left his studies in 1883. He worked as a private tutor and worked as an editor for the Hamburger Correspondenten and, in 1890, became an editor at the Brockhaus-Verlag in Leipzig. He married Friederike Mann (1864–1921) in 1887 and he refused to put his children into the state school, leading to conflict with the authorities. He started a private school and moved to Berlin-Lichterfelde in 1902 on the invitation of the Prussian Ministry of Culture. At his private school, he believed in the use of natural teaching methods based on conversation, care and play and avoided authoritarian approaches. He believed in intellectual intercourse and the right of the child to ask questions. He promoted the idea of holistic living relationships with people. He considered education as a means to observe the world and one's own thinking. He, however, supported concepts of nationalism and wanted children to uphold communal traditions. He received a Kerschensteiner Medal in 1929 for his work on education.

Otto died in Berlin.

His approach influenced Cor Bruijn in the Netherlands and the members of the commission under Konstantin Ventsel who were involved in Russian education for children.
