= Friedrich Paulsen =

German philosopher and educator (1846–1908)

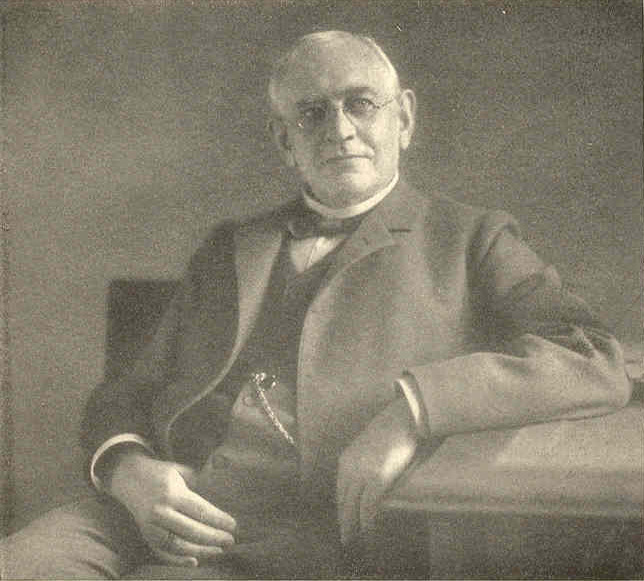
- Born: 16 July 1846; Langenhorn, Duchy of Schleswig
- Died: 14 August 1908 (aged 62); Steglitz, German Empire

Education
- Education: University of Erlangen; University of Bonn; Kiel University; University of Berlin (Dr. phil.)
- Thesis: Symbolae ad systemata philosophiae moralis historicae et criticae (1871)
- Doctoral advisor: Friedrich Adolf Trendelenburg

Philosophical work
- Era: 19th-century philosophy
- Region: Western philosophy
- School: Neo-Kantianism; Epistemological realism
- Institutions: University of Berlin
- Doctoral students: Traugott Konstantin Oesterreich; Eduard Spranger
- Notable students: See list: Jonas Cohn; Friedrich Wilhelm Foerster; Paul Hinneberg; Edmund Husserl; Theodor Litt; Herman Nohl; Berthold Otto; Albert Schweitzer; William Stern; Ferdinand Tönnies
- Main interests: Ethics, philosophy of education, metaphysics
- Notable ideas: Panpsychism

Friedrich Paulsen (/ˈpaʊlzən/; German: [ˈpaʊlzən]; July 16, 1846 – August 14, 1908) was a German neo-Kantian philosopher and educator. He was a proponent of epistemological realism.

== Biography ==
He was born at Langenhorn (Schleswig) and educated at the Gymnasium Christianeum, the University of Erlangen, and the University of Berlin. He completed his doctoral thesis under Friedrich Adolf Trendelenburg at Berlin in 1871, he habilitated there in 1875, and he became extraordinary professor of philosophy and pedagogy there in 1878. In 1896 he succeeded Eduard Zeller as professor of moral philosophy at Berlin.

He was the greatest of the followers of Gustav Theodor Fechner, to whose doctrine of panpsychism he gave great prominence by his Einleitung in die Philosophie (1892; 7th ed., 1900; Eng. trans., 1895). He went, however, considerably beyond Fechner in attempting to give an epistemological account of the knowledge of the psychophysical. Admitting Immanuel Kant's hypothesis that by inner sense we are conscious of mental states only, he holds that this consciousness constitutes a knowledge of the thing-in-itself which Kant denies. Soul is, therefore, a practical reality which Paulsen, with Arthur Schopenhauer, regards as known by the act of will. But this will is neither rational desire, unconscious irrational will, nor conscious intelligent will, but an instinct, a will to live (Zielstrebigkeit), often subconscious, pursuing ends, indeed, but without reasoning as to means. This conception of will, though consistent and convenient to the main thesis, must be rigidly distinguished from the ordinary significance of will, i.e. rational desire.

Paulsen was a proponent of hylozoism, stating it is "a conception which almost irresistibly forces itself upon modern biology." He is better known for his educational writings than as a pure philosopher, including his German Education, Past and Present (Eng. trans., by I. Lorenz, 1907).

He died in Berlin.

== Works ==
Among his other works are:

- Versuch einer Entwickelunggeschichte der Kantischen Erkenntnistheorie (1875)
- Im. Kant (1898; 2nd ed. 1899)
- "Gründung, Organisation und Lebensordnungen der deutschen Universitäten im Mittelalter". Sybels Histor. Zeitschrift. xlv. 1881.
- Geschichte des gelehrten Unterrichts auf den deutschen Schulen und Universitäten (1885; 2nd ed. 1896)
- System der Ethik (1889; 2nd ed. 1899; Eng. trans. [partial] 1899)
- Das Realgymnasium u. d. humanist. Bildung (1889)
- Hume, David (1894). Dialoge über natürliche Religion. Über Selbsmord und Untsterblichkeit der Seele. Translated by Friedrich Paulsen (2 ed.). Leipzig: Verlag der Dürr'schen Buchhandlung – via Google Books.
- Kant d. Philos. d. Protestantismus (1899)
- Schopenhauer, Hamlet u. Mephistopheles (1900)
- Philosophia militans (1900; 2nd ed. 1901)
- Parteipolitik u. Moral (1900)
