= Struckum =

Struckum Strukum / Strükem
- Municipality
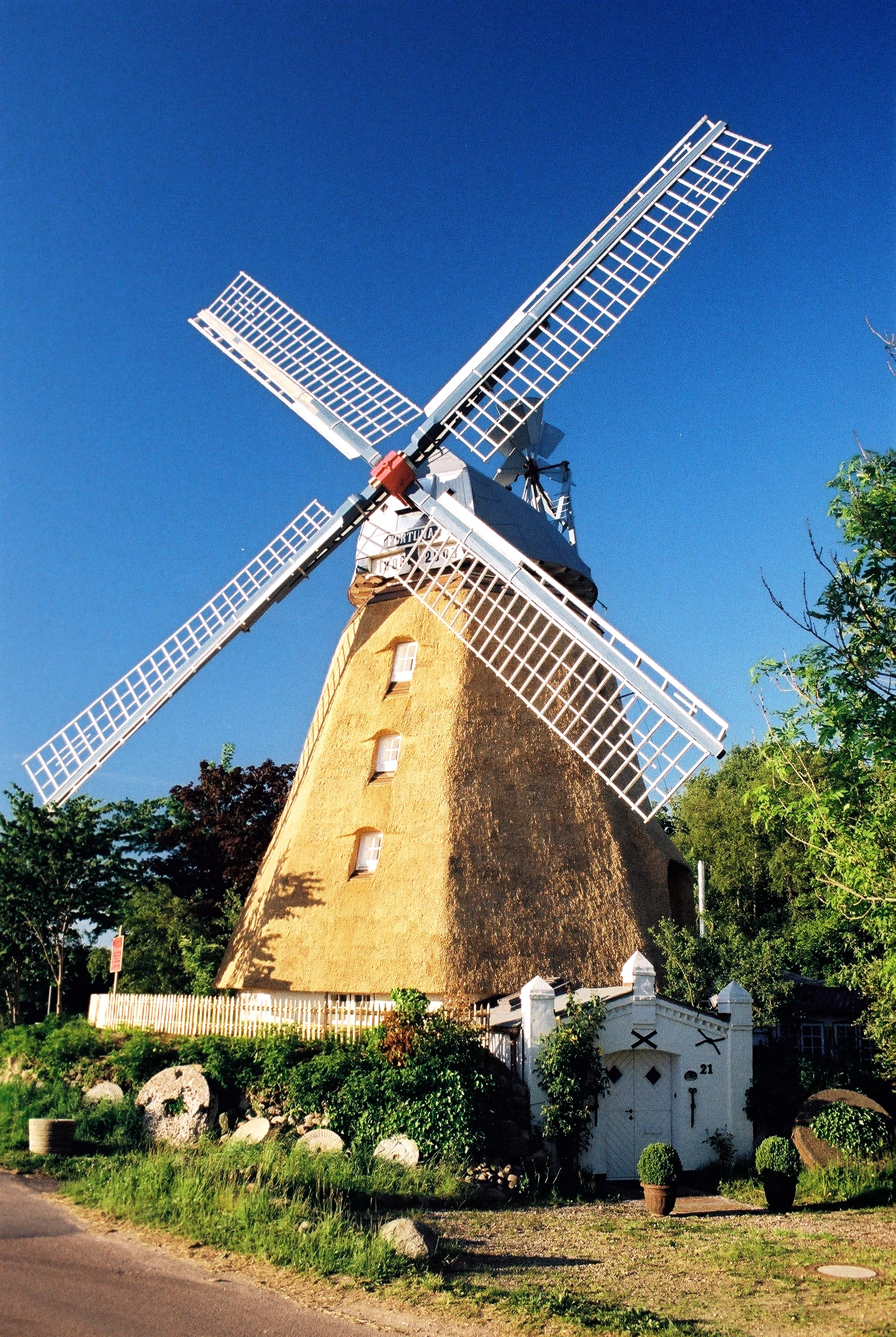
- Fortuna, Struckum's historical windmill

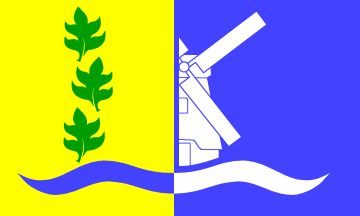
- Flag Coat of arms

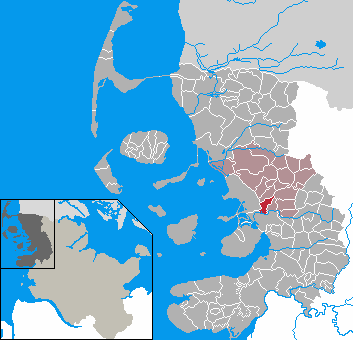
- Location of Struckum; Strukum / Strükem within Nordfriesland district
- Interactive map of Struckum; Strukum / Strükem
- Location within Germany Location within Schleswig-Holstein
- Coordinates: 54°35′N 9°0′E
- Country: Germany
- State: Schleswig-Holstein
- District: Nordfriesland
- Municipal assoc.: Mittleres Nordfriesland

Government
  - Mayor: Andreas Petersen

Area
  - Total: 8.92 km^{2} (3.44 sq mi)
- Elevation: 4 m (13 ft)

Population (2025-12-31)
  - Total: 1,071
  - Density: 120/km^{2} (311/sq mi)
- Time zone: UTC+01:00 (CET)
  - Summer (DST): UTC+02:00 (CEST)
- Postal codes: 25821
- Dialling codes: 04671
- Vehicle registration: NF
- Website: www.amt-bredstedt- land.de

Struckum (Danish: Strukum, North Frisian: Strükem) is a municipality in the district of Nordfriesland, in Schleswig-Holstein, Germany.
