= Sönnebüll =

Sönnebüll Sønnesbøl / Säänebel
- Municipality
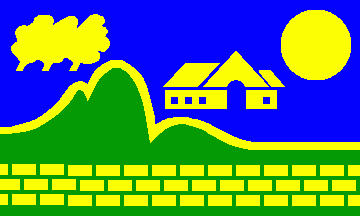
- Flag Coat of arms

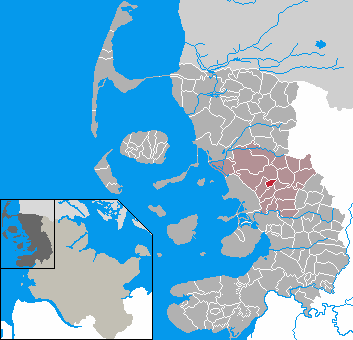
- Location of Sönnebüll; Sønnesbøl / Säänebel within Nordfriesland district
- Interactive map of Sönnebüll; Sønnesbøl / Säänebel
- Location within Germany Location within Schleswig-Holstein
- Coordinates: 54°37′N 9°0′E
- Country: Germany
- State: Schleswig-Holstein
- District: Nordfriesland
- Municipal assoc.: Mittleres Nordfriesland

Government
  - Mayor: Christian Christiansen

Area
  - Total: 4.29 km^{2} (1.66 sq mi)
- Elevation: 14 m (46 ft)

Population (2025-12-31)
  - Total: 313
  - Density: 73.0/km^{2} (189/sq mi)
- Time zone: UTC+01:00 (CET)
  - Summer (DST): UTC+02:00 (CEST)
- Postal codes: 25821
- Dialling codes: 04671
- Vehicle registration: NF
- Website: www.soennebuell.de

Sönnebüll (Danish: Sønnesbøl, North Frisian: Säänebel) is a municipality in the district of Nordfriesland, in Schleswig-Holstein, Germany.
