= Drelsdorf =

Drelsdorf Trelstorp / Trölstrup
- Municipality
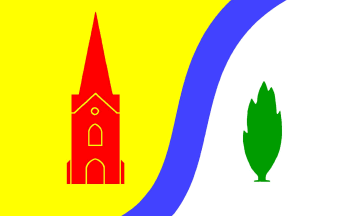
- Flag Coat of arms

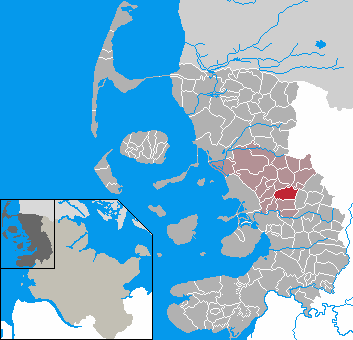
- Location of Drelsdorf; Trelstorp / Trölstrup within Nordfriesland district
- Interactive map of Drelsdorf; Trelstorp / Trölstrup
- Location within Germany Location within Schleswig-Holstein
- Coordinates: 54°39′N 9°3′E
- Country: Germany
- State: Schleswig-Holstein
- District: Nordfriesland
- Municipal assoc.: Mittleres Nordfriesland

Government
  - Mayor: Harald Paulsen

Area
  - Total: 17.7 km^{2} (6.8 sq mi)
- Elevation: 9 m (30 ft)

Population (2025-12-31)
  - Total: 1,280
  - Density: 72.3/km^{2} (187/sq mi)
- Time zone: UTC+01:00 (CET)
  - Summer (DST): UTC+02:00 (CEST)
- Postal codes: 25853
- Dialling codes: 04671
- Vehicle registration: NF
- Website: www.drelsdorf.de

Drelsdorf (Danish: Trelstrup; North Frisian: Trölstrup) is a municipality in the district of Nordfriesland, in Schleswig-Holstein, Germany. Drelsdorf is home to the last remaining speakers of the Central Goesharde Frisian dialect of North Frisian.
