= Joldelund =

- Municipality
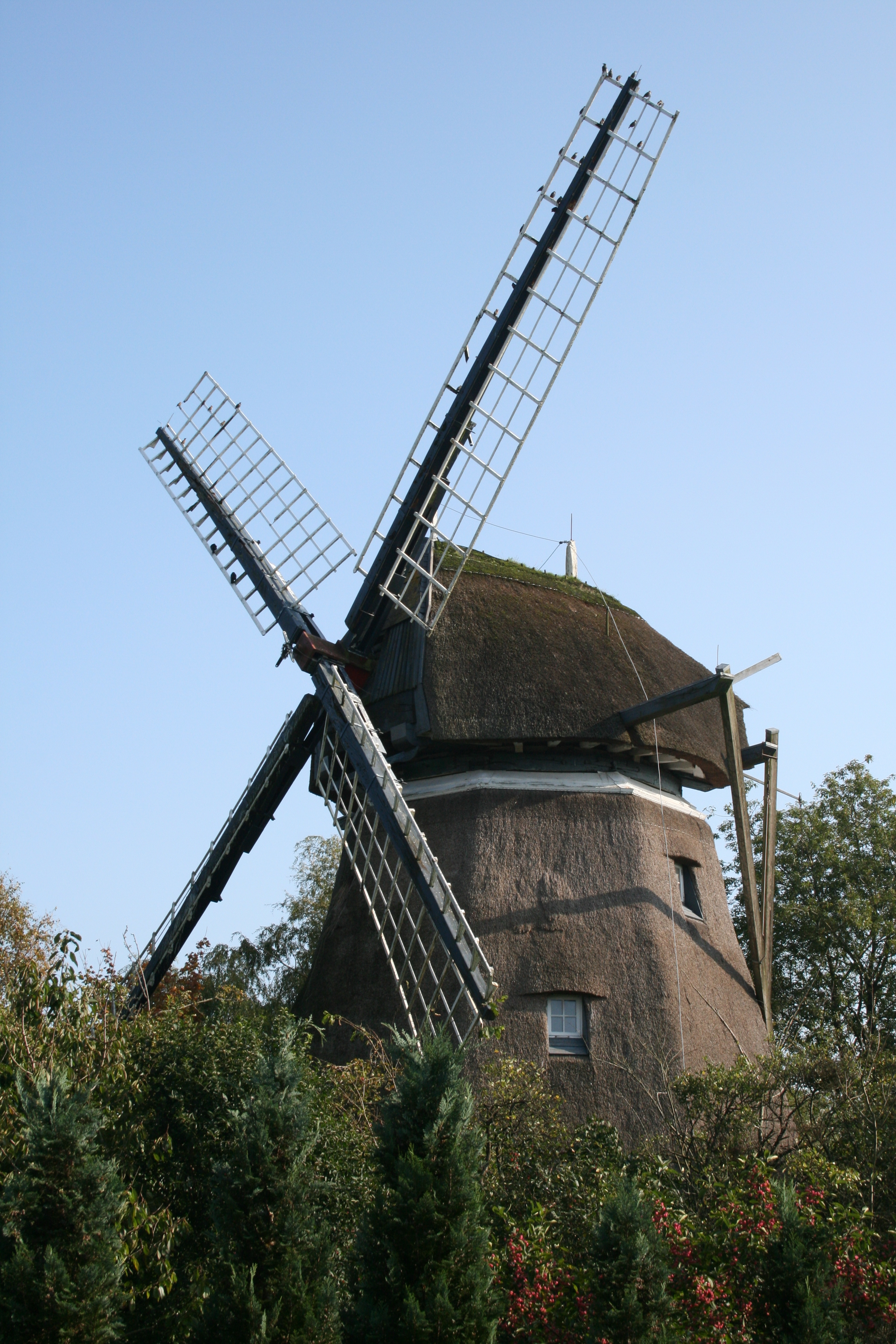
- Old windmill at Joldelund

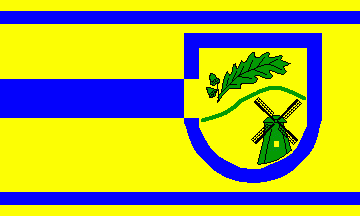
- Flag Coat of arms

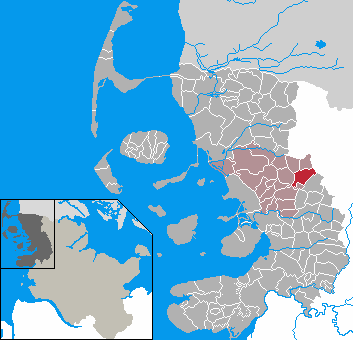
- Location of Joldelund within Nordfriesland district
- Interactive map of Joldelund
- Location within Germany Location within Schleswig-Holstein
- Coordinates: 54°38′N 9°7′E
- Country: Germany
- State: Schleswig-Holstein
- District: Nordfriesland
- Municipal assoc.: Mittleres Nordfriesland

Government
  - Mayor: Gisela Rabe

Area
  - Total: 19.12 km^{2} (7.38 sq mi)
- Elevation: 26 m (85 ft)

Population (2025-12-31)
  - Total: 820
  - Density: 43/km^{2} (110/sq mi)
- Time zone: UTC+01:00 (CET)
  - Summer (DST): UTC+02:00 (CEST)
- Postal codes: 25862
- Dialling codes: 04673
- Vehicle registration: NF
- Website: www.amt-bredstedt-land.de

Joldelund is a municipality in the district of Nordfriesland, in Schleswig-Holstein, Germany.
