= Kolkerheide =

Kolkerheide Kolkhede
- Municipality
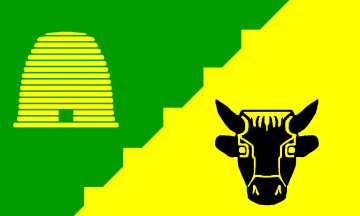
- Flag Coat of arms

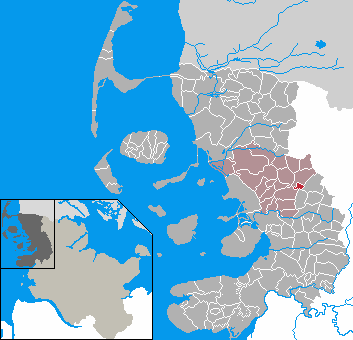
- Location of Kolkerheide; Kolkhede within Nordfriesland district
- Interactive map of Kolkerheide; Kolkhede
- Location within Germany Location within Schleswig-Holstein
- Coordinates: 54°37′N 9°7′E
- Country: Germany
- State: Schleswig-Holstein
- District: Nordfriesland
- Municipal assoc.: Mittleres Nordfriesland

Government
  - Mayor: Hans-Günther Thordsen

Area
  - Total: 2.1 km^{2} (0.81 sq mi)
- Elevation: 14 m (46 ft)

Population (2025-12-31)
  - Total: 58
  - Density: 28/km^{2} (72/sq mi)
- Time zone: UTC+01:00 (CET)
  - Summer (DST): UTC+02:00 (CEST)
- Postal codes: 25862
- Dialling codes: 04673
- Vehicle registration: NF
- Website: www.amt-bredstedt- land.de

Kolkerheide (Danish: Kolkhede or Kolkærhede) is a municipality in the district of Nordfriesland, in Schleswig-Holstein, Germany.
