= Vollstedt =

Vollstedt Folsted
- Municipality
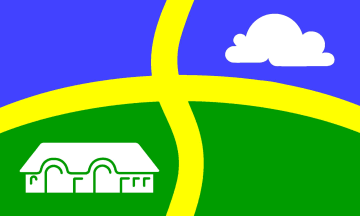
- Flag Coat of arms

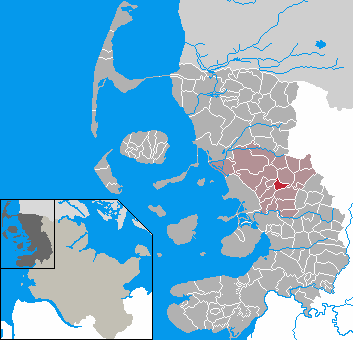
- Location of Vollstedt; Folsted within Nordfriesland district
- Interactive map of Vollstedt; Folsted
- Location within Germany Location within Schleswig-Holstein
- Coordinates: 54°37′N 9°1′E
- Country: Germany
- State: Schleswig-Holstein
- District: Nordfriesland
- Municipal assoc.: Mittleres Nordfriesland

Government
  - Mayor: Hans-Jakob Paulsen

Area
  - Total: 6.18 km^{2} (2.39 sq mi)
- Elevation: 9 m (30 ft)

Population (2025-12-31)
  - Total: 188
  - Density: 30.4/km^{2} (78.8/sq mi)
- Time zone: UTC+01:00 (CET)
  - Summer (DST): UTC+02:00 (CEST)
- Postal codes: 25821
- Dialling codes: 04671
- Vehicle registration: NF
- Website: www.amt-bredstedt- land.de

Vollstedt (German pronunciation: [ˈfɔlʃtɛt]; Danish: Folsted; North Frisian: Fåålst) is a municipality in the district of Nordfriesland, in Schleswig-Holstein, Germany.
