= Lütjenholm =

Lütjenholm Lilholm
- Municipality
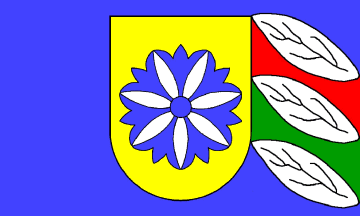
- Flag Coat of arms

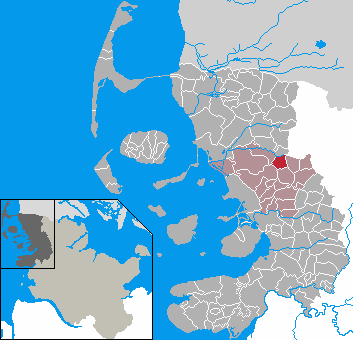
- Location of Lütjenholm; Lilholm within Nordfriesland district
- Interactive map of Lütjenholm; Lilholm
- Location within Germany Location within Schleswig-Holstein
- Coordinates: 54°40′N 9°1′E
- Country: Germany
- State: Schleswig-Holstein
- District: Nordfriesland
- Municipal assoc.: Mittleres Nordfriesland

Government
  - Mayor: Diedrich Sönksen

Area
  - Total: 10.71 km^{2} (4.14 sq mi)
- Elevation: 4 m (13 ft)

Population (2025-12-31)
  - Total: 338
  - Density: 31.6/km^{2} (81.7/sq mi)
- Time zone: UTC+01:00 (CET)
  - Summer (DST): UTC+02:00 (CEST)
- Postal codes: 25842
- Dialling codes: 04672
- Vehicle registration: NF
- Website: www.luetjenholm.de

Lütjenholm (Danish: Lilholm, North Frisian: Läitjholem) is a municipality in the district of Nordfriesland, in Schleswig-Holstein, Germany.
