= Goldelund =

- Municipality
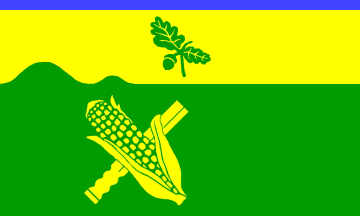
- Flag Coat of arms

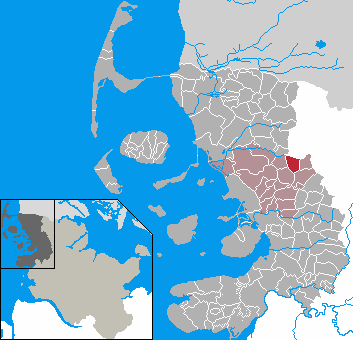
- Location of Goldelund within Nordfriesland district
- Interactive map of Goldelund
- Location within Germany Location within Schleswig-Holstein
- Coordinates: 54°40′N 9°5′E
- Country: Germany
- State: Schleswig-Holstein
- District: Nordfriesland
- Municipal assoc.: Mittleres Nordfriesland

Government
  - Mayor: Waltraud Schnoewitz

Area
  - Total: 12.02 km^{2} (4.64 sq mi)
- Elevation: 9 m (30 ft)

Population (2025-12-31)
  - Total: 427
  - Density: 35.5/km^{2} (92.0/sq mi)
- Time zone: UTC+01:00 (CET)
  - Summer (DST): UTC+02:00 (CEST)
- Postal codes: 25862
- Dialling codes: 04673
- Vehicle registration: NF
- Website: www.goldelund.de

Goldelund is a municipality in the district of Nordfriesland, in Schleswig-Holstein, Germany.
