= Goldebek =

Goldebek Goldebæk
- Municipality
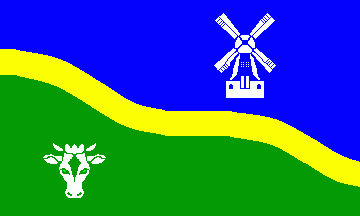
- Flag Coat of arms

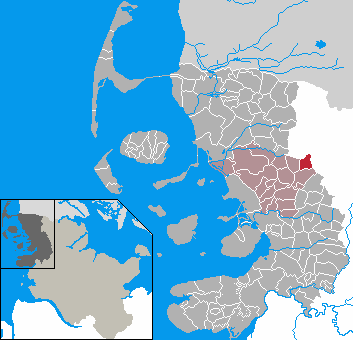
- Location of Goldebek; Goldebæk within Nordfriesland district
- Interactive map of Goldebek; Goldebæk
- Location within Germany Location within Schleswig-Holstein
- Coordinates: 54°40′N 9°9′E
- Country: Germany
- State: Schleswig-Holstein
- District: Nordfriesland
- Municipal assoc.: Mittleres Nordfriesland

Government
  - Mayor: Peter Jessen

Area
  - Total: 10.18 km^{2} (3.93 sq mi)
- Elevation: 12 m (39 ft)

Population (2025-12-31)
  - Total: 381
  - Density: 37.4/km^{2} (96.9/sq mi)
- Time zone: UTC+01:00 (CET)
  - Summer (DST): UTC+02:00 (CEST)
- Postal codes: 25862
- Dialling codes: 04673
- Vehicle registration: NF
- Website: www.amt-bredstedt- land.de

Goldebek (Danish: Goldebæk, North Frisian: Golbäk) is a municipality in the district of Nordfriesland, in Schleswig-Holstein, Germany.
