= Högel =

Högel Høgel / Höögel
- Municipality
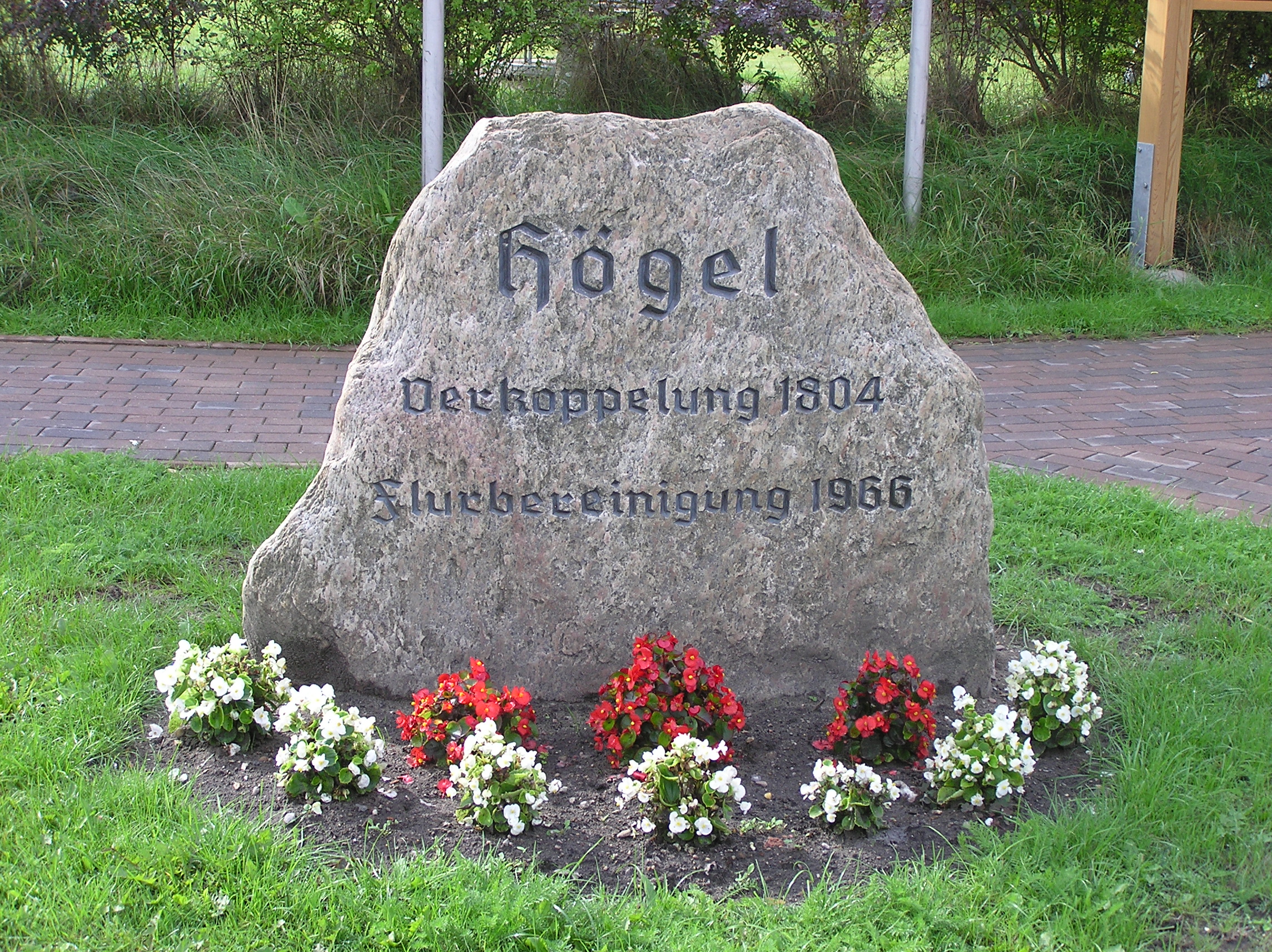
- Commemorative stone reminding of agricultural reforms in 1804 and 1966

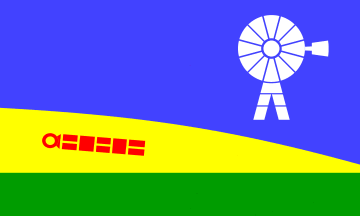
- Flag Coat of arms

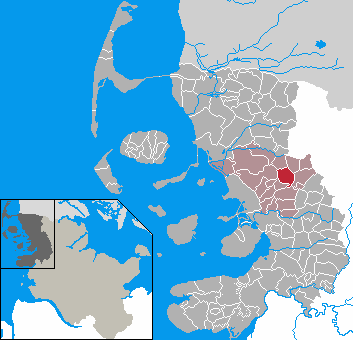
- Location of Högel; Høgel / Höögel within Nordfriesland district
- Interactive map of Högel; Høgel / Höögel
- Location within Germany Location within Schleswig-Holstein
- Coordinates: 54°38′N 9°4′E
- Country: Germany
- State: Schleswig-Holstein
- District: Nordfriesland
- Municipal assoc.: Mittleres Nordfriesland

Government
  - Mayor: Tanja Carstensen

Area
  - Total: 16.28 km^{2} (6.29 sq mi)
- Elevation: 9 m (30 ft)

Population (2025-12-31)
  - Total: 502
  - Density: 30.8/km^{2} (79.9/sq mi)
- Time zone: UTC+01:00 (CET)
  - Summer (DST): UTC+02:00 (CEST)
- Postal codes: 25858
- Dialling codes: 04673
- Vehicle registration: NF
- Website: www.amt-bredstedt- land.de

Högel (Danish: Høgel, North Frisian: Höögel) is a municipality in the district of Nordfriesland, in Schleswig-Holstein, Germany.
