= Ahrenshöft =

Ahrenshöft Arenshoved / Oornshaud
- Municipality
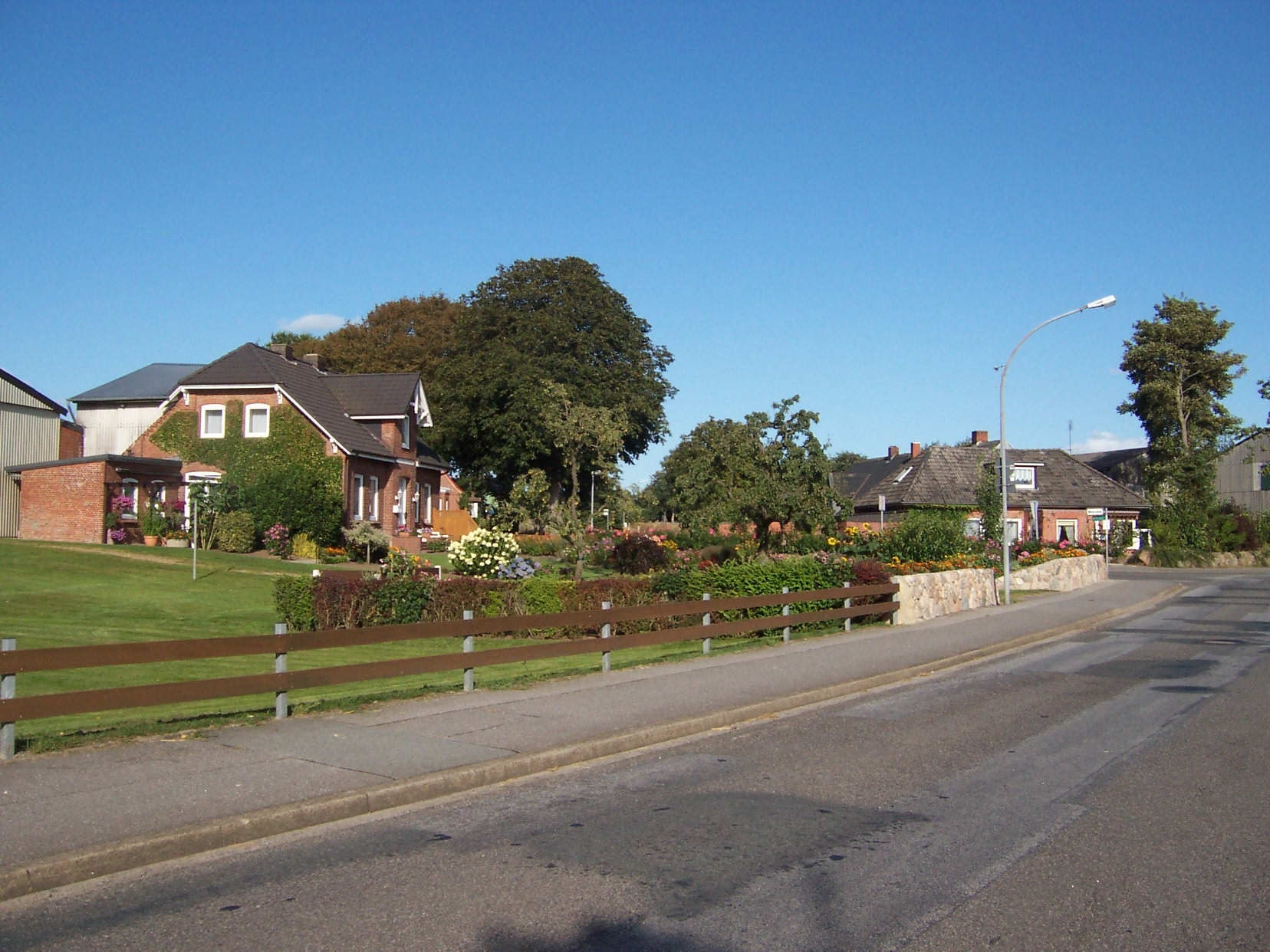

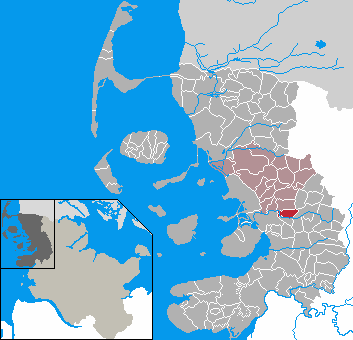
- Location of Ahrenshöft; Arenshoved / Oornshaud within Nordfriesland district
- Interactive map of Ahrenshöft; Arenshoved / Oornshaud
- Location within Germany Location within Schleswig-Holstein
- Coordinates: 54°34′N 9°4′E
- Country: Germany
- State: Schleswig-Holstein
- District: Nordfriesland
- Municipal assoc.: Mittleres Nordfriesland

Government
  - Mayor: Arnold Petersen

Area
  - Total: 8.65 km^{2} (3.34 sq mi)
- Elevation: 5 m (16 ft)

Population (2025-12-31)
  - Total: 566
  - Density: 65.4/km^{2} (169/sq mi)
- Time zone: UTC+01:00 (CET)
  - Summer (DST): UTC+02:00 (CEST)
- Postal codes: 25853
- Dialling codes: 04846
- Vehicle registration: NF

Ahrenshöft (North Frisian: Oornshaud; Danish: Arnshøft, Arenshøft or Arenshoved) is a municipality in Nordfriesland district, in northern Germany.

The municipality covers an area of 8.65 km^{2}. Of the total population of 527, 268 are male, and 259 are female (Dec 31, 2002). The population density of the community is 61 inhabitants per km^{2}.
