= Almdorf =

Almdorf Almtorp or Almtrup (Danish)
- Municipality
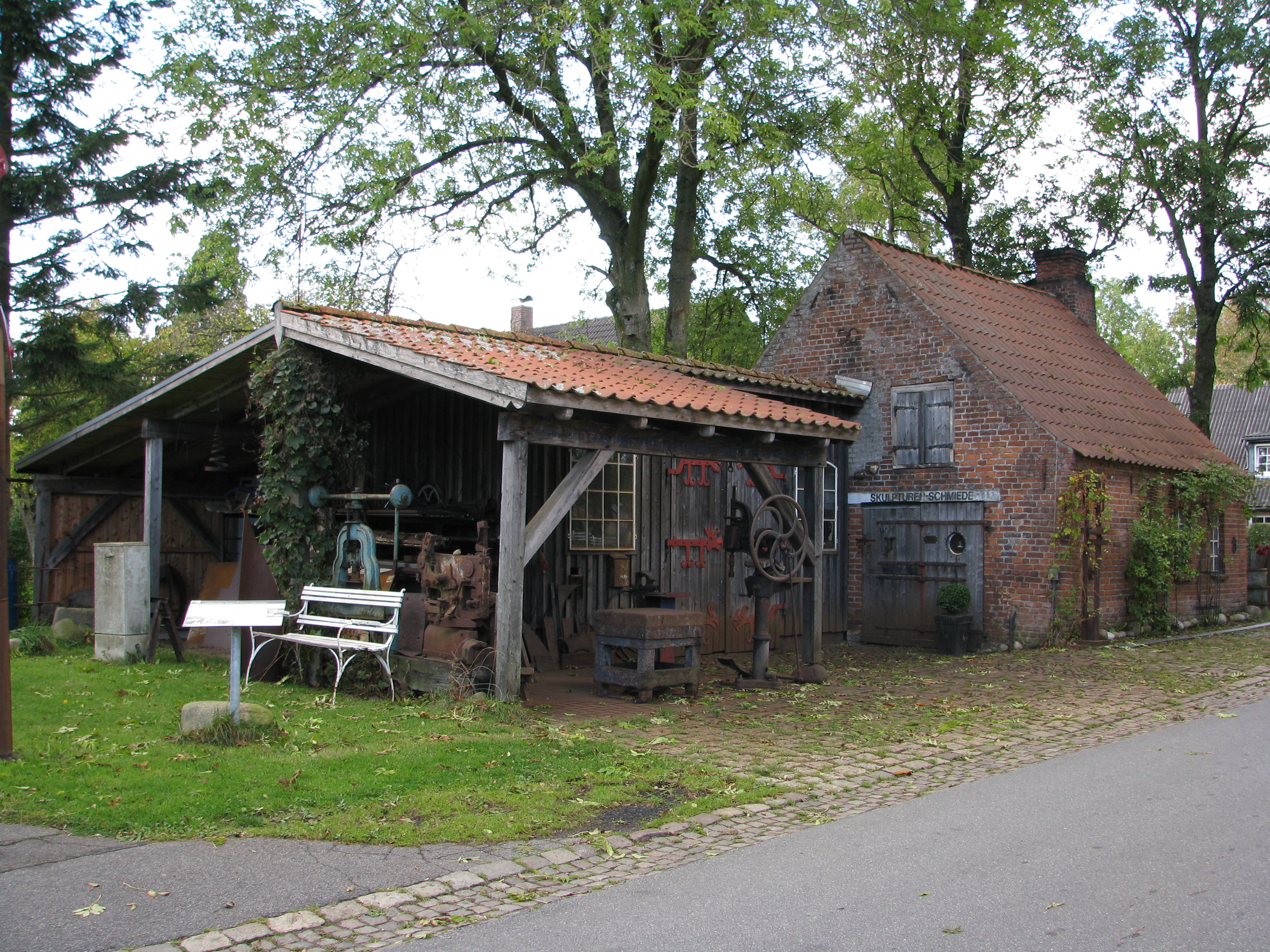

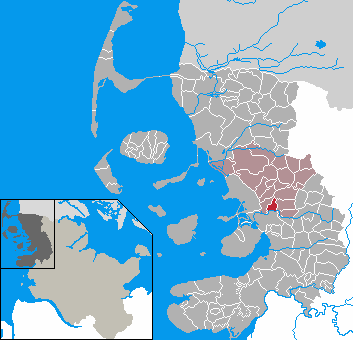
- Location of Almdorf; Almtorp or Almtrup (Danish) within Nordfriesland district
- Interactive map of Almdorf; Almtorp or Almtrup (Danish)
- Location within Germany Location within Schleswig-Holstein
- Coordinates: 54°34′50″N 9°0′56″E
- Country: Germany
- State: Schleswig-Holstein
- District: Nordfriesland
- Municipal assoc.: Mittleres Nordfriesland

Government
  - Mayor: Werner Sutter

Area
  - Total: 5.7 km^{2} (2.2 sq mi)
- Elevation: 3 m (9.8 ft)

Population (2025-12-31)
  - Total: 556
  - Density: 98/km^{2} (250/sq mi)
- Time zone: UTC+01:00 (CET)
  - Summer (DST): UTC+02:00 (CEST)
- Postal codes: 25821
- Dialling codes: 04671
- Vehicle registration: NF
- Website: www.amt-bredstedt- land.de

Almdorf (Danish: Almtorp, also: Almtrup) is a municipality in the district of Nordfriesland, in Schleswig-Holstein, Germany.
