= Breklum =

- Municipality
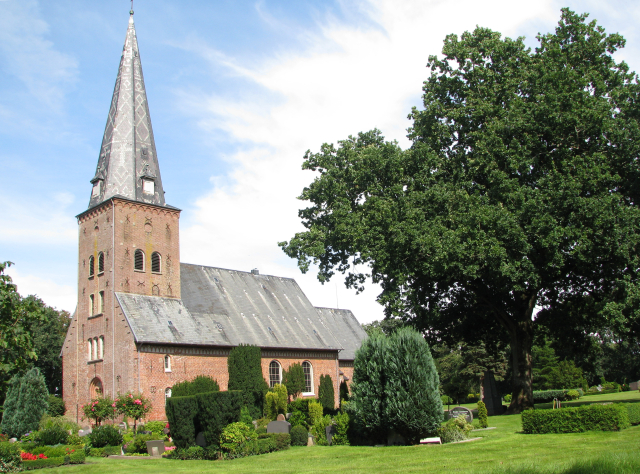
- Sunte Oluf church in Breklum

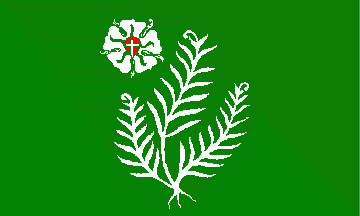
- Flag Coat of arms

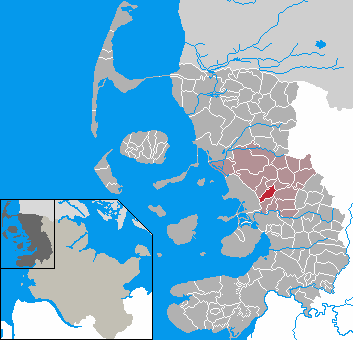
- Location of Breklum within Nordfriesland district
- Interactive map of Breklum
- Location within Germany Location within Schleswig-Holstein
- Coordinates: 54°36′17″N 8°59′04″E
- Country: Germany
- State: Schleswig-Holstein
- District: Nordfriesland
- Municipal assoc.: Mittleres Nordfriesland

Government
  - Mayor: Eberhard Steinke

Area
  - Total: 10.06 km^{2} (3.88 sq mi)
- Elevation: 7 m (23 ft)

Population (2025-12-31)
  - Total: 2,362
  - Density: 234.8/km^{2} (608.1/sq mi)
- Time zone: UTC+01:00 (CET)
  - Summer (DST): UTC+02:00 (CEST)
- Postal codes: 25821
- Dialling codes: 04671
- Vehicle registration: NF
- Website: www.amt-bredstedt- land.de

Breklum is a municipality in the district of Nordfriesland, in Schleswig-Holstein, Germany.
