= Bordelum =

- Municipality
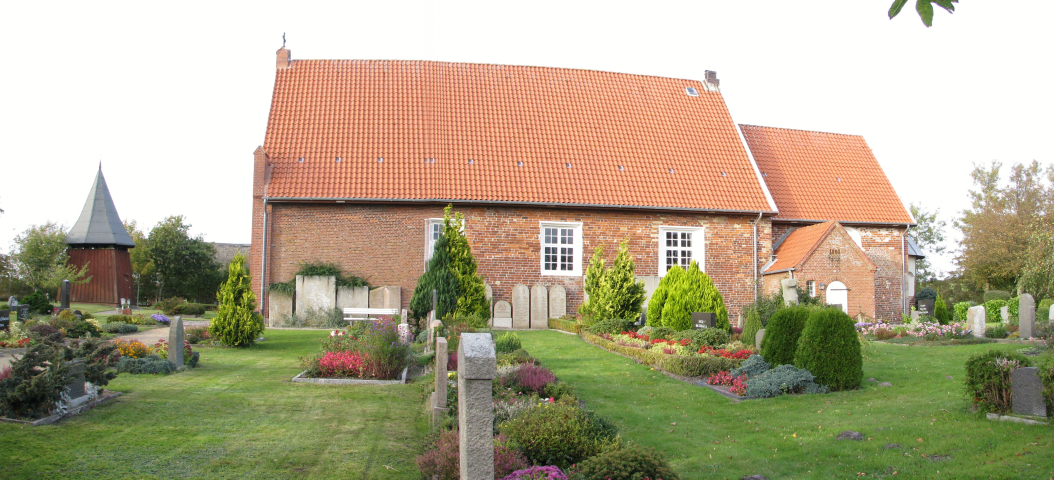
- Saint Nicholas Church

- Coat of arms

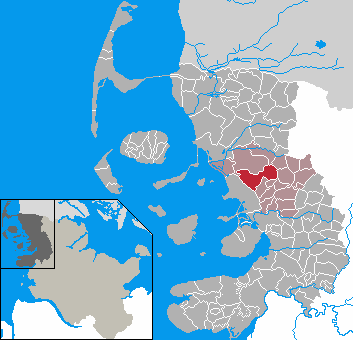
- Location of Bordelum within Nordfriesland district
- Interactive map of Bordelum
- Location within Germany Location within Schleswig-Holstein
- Coordinates: 54°37′17″N 8°55′32″E
- Country: Germany
- State: Schleswig-Holstein
- District: Nordfriesland
- Municipal assoc.: Mittleres Nordfriesland

Government
  - Mayor: Peter Reinhold Petersen

Area
  - Total: 34.71 km^{2} (13.40 sq mi)
- Elevation: 11 m (36 ft)

Population (2025-12-31)
  - Total: 2,023
  - Density: 58.28/km^{2} (151.0/sq mi)
- Time zone: UTC+01:00 (CET)
  - Summer (DST): UTC+02:00 (CEST)
- Postal codes: 25852
- Dialling codes: 04671
- Vehicle registration: NF

Bordelum (North Frisian: Boorlem) is a municipality in the district of Nordfriesland, in Schleswig-Holstein, Germany.
