= Bohmstedt =

Bohmstedt Bomsted / Bååmst
- Municipality
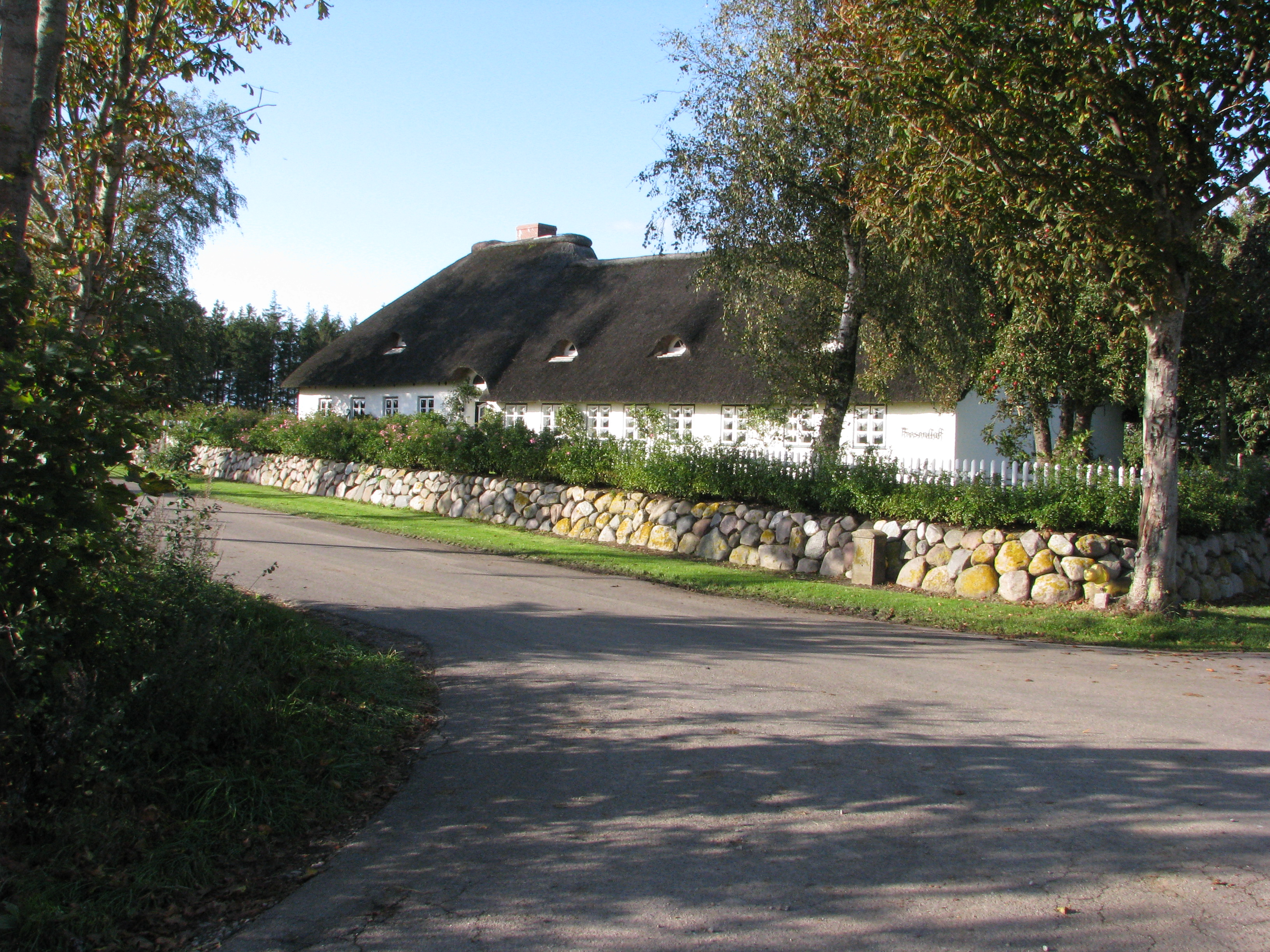
- An old farmhouse in Bohmstedt

- Coat of arms

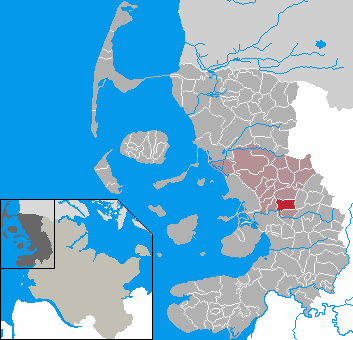
- Location of Bohmstedt; Bomsted / Bååmst within Nordfriesland district
- Interactive map of Bohmstedt; Bomsted / Bååmst
- Location within Germany Location within Schleswig-Holstein
- Coordinates: 54°34′N 09°03′E
- Country: Germany
- State: Schleswig-Holstein
- District: Nordfriesland
- Municipal assoc.: Mittleres Nordfriesland

Government
  - Mayor: Ralf Kille

Area
  - Total: 13.35 km^{2} (5.15 sq mi)
- Elevation: 8 m (26 ft)

Population (2025-12-31)
  - Total: 819
  - Density: 61.3/km^{2} (159/sq mi)
- Time zone: UTC+01:00 (CET)
  - Summer (DST): UTC+02:00 (CEST)
- Postal codes: 25853
- Dialling codes: 04671
- Vehicle registration: NF
- Website: www.amt-bredstedt- land.de

Bohmstedt (Danish: Bomsted, North Frisian: Bååmst) is a municipality in the district of Nordfriesland, in Schleswig-Holstein, Germany.
