= Bargum =

- Municipality
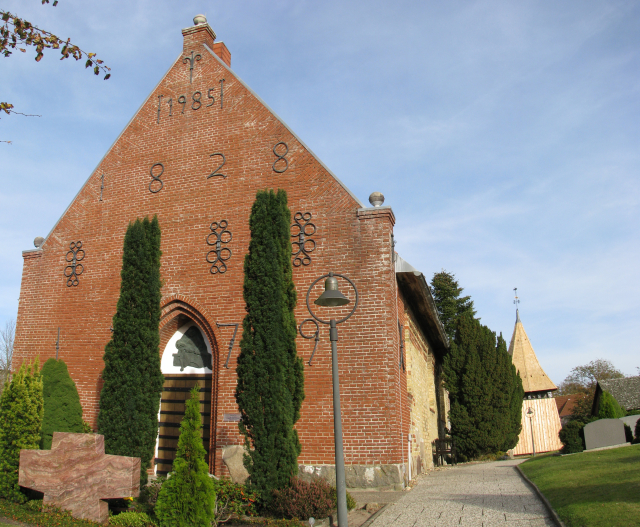
- The church in Bargum, note the separate wooden bell tower, a typical architectureal feature in North Frisia and also in Angeln ("Anglia")

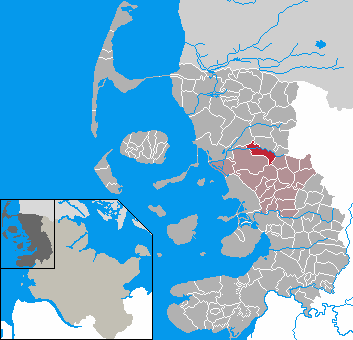
- Location of Bargum within Nordfriesland district
- Interactive map of Bargum
- Location within Germany Location within Schleswig-Holstein
- Coordinates: 54°42′13″N 8°57′29″E
- Country: Germany
- State: Schleswig-Holstein
- District: Nordfriesland
- Municipal assoc.: Mittleres Nordfriesland

Government
  - Mayor: Bernd Wolf

Area
  - Total: 17.29 km^{2} (6.68 sq mi)
- Elevation: 4 m (13 ft)

Population (2025-12-31)
  - Total: 670
  - Density: 39/km^{2} (100/sq mi)
- Time zone: UTC+01:00 (CET)
  - Summer (DST): UTC+02:00 (CEST)
- Postal codes: 25842
- Dialling codes: 04672
- Vehicle registration: NF

Bargum is a municipality in the district of Nordfriesland, in Schleswig-Holstein, Germany.
