= Ockholm =

Ockholm Okholm
- Municipality
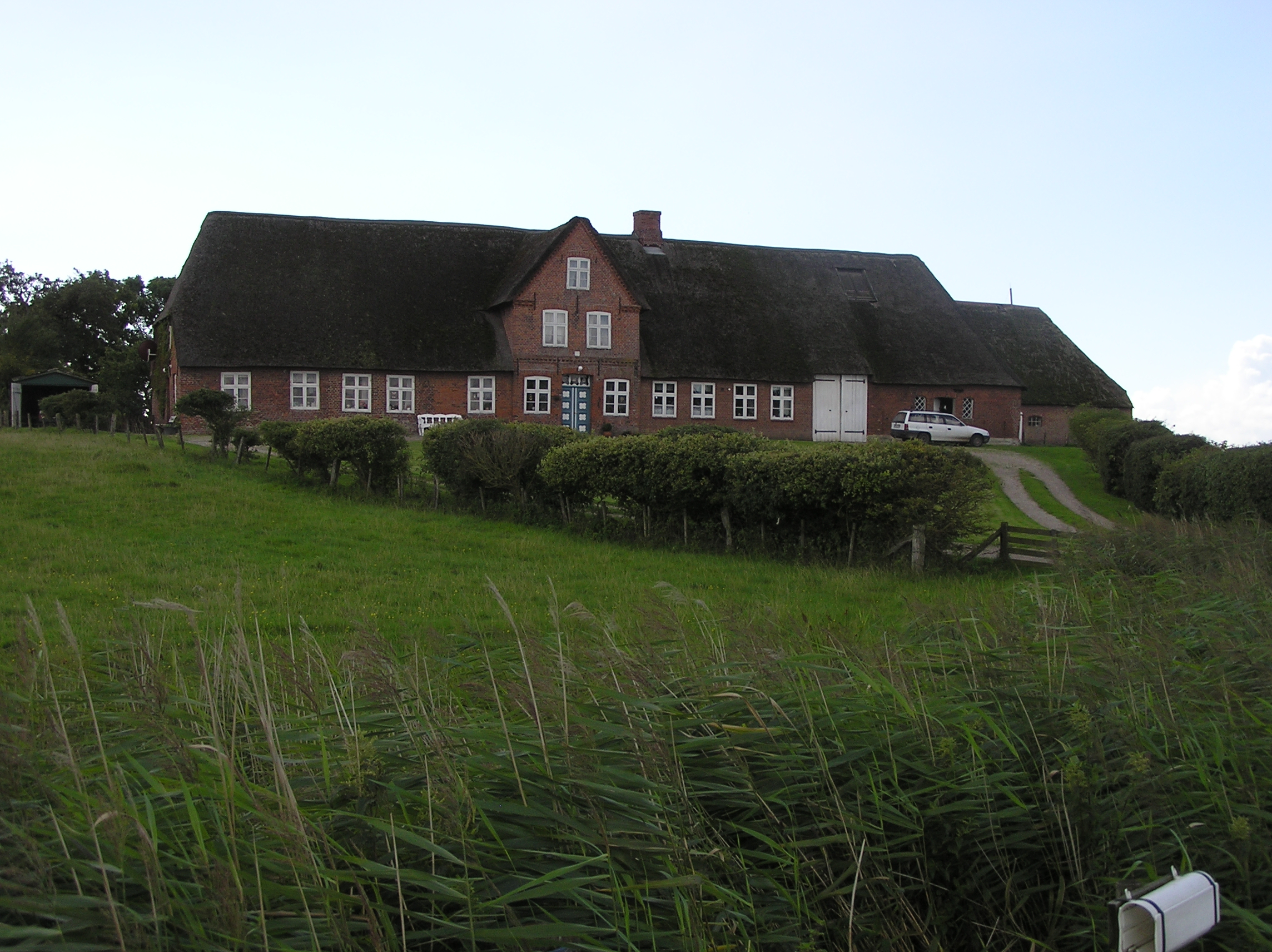
- Peterswarf, a Geestharden house in Ockholm

- Coat of arms

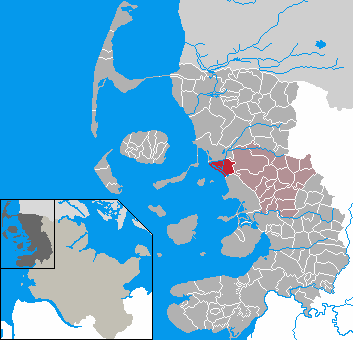
- Location of Ockholm; Okholm within Nordfriesland district
- Interactive map of Ockholm; Okholm
- Location within Germany Location within Schleswig-Holstein
- Coordinates: 54°40′3″N 8°49′41″E
- Country: Germany
- State: Schleswig-Holstein
- District: Nordfriesland
- Municipal assoc.: Mittleres Nordfriesland

Government
  - Mayor: Claudia Weinbrandt

Area
  - Total: 18.64 km^{2} (7.20 sq mi)
- Elevation: 1 m (3.3 ft)

Population (2025-12-31)
  - Total: 337
  - Density: 18.1/km^{2} (46.8/sq mi)
- Time zone: UTC+01:00 (CET)
  - Summer (DST): UTC+02:00 (CEST)
- Postal codes: 25842
- Dialling codes: 04674
- Vehicle registration: NF

Ockholm (German: [ˈɔkˌhɔlm]; Danish: Okholm) is a municipality in the district of Nordfriesland, in Schleswig-Holstein, Germany.
