= Langenhorn (Nordfriesland) =

Langenhorn Langhorn
- Municipality
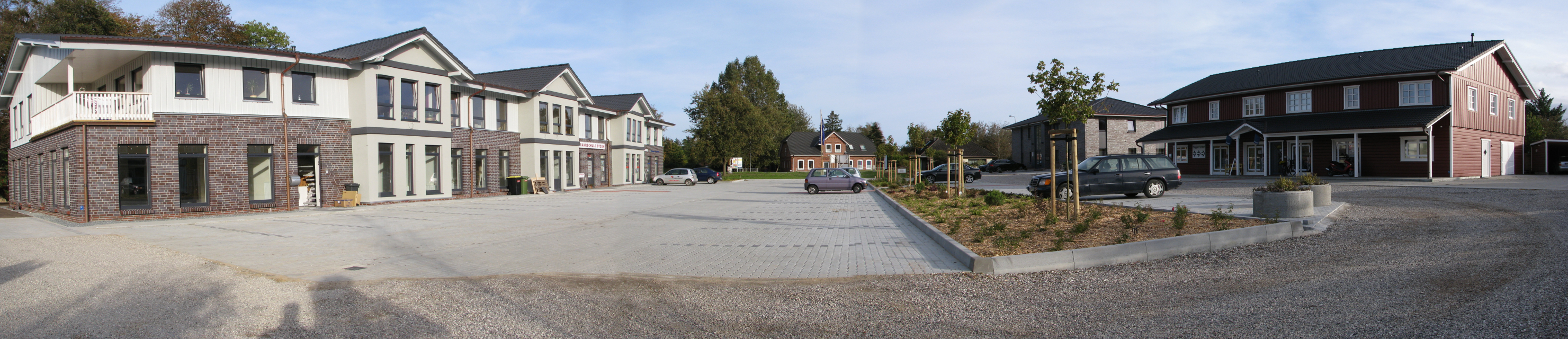
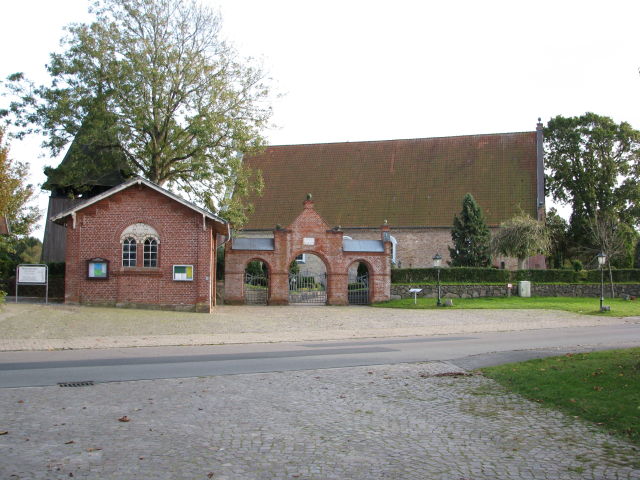
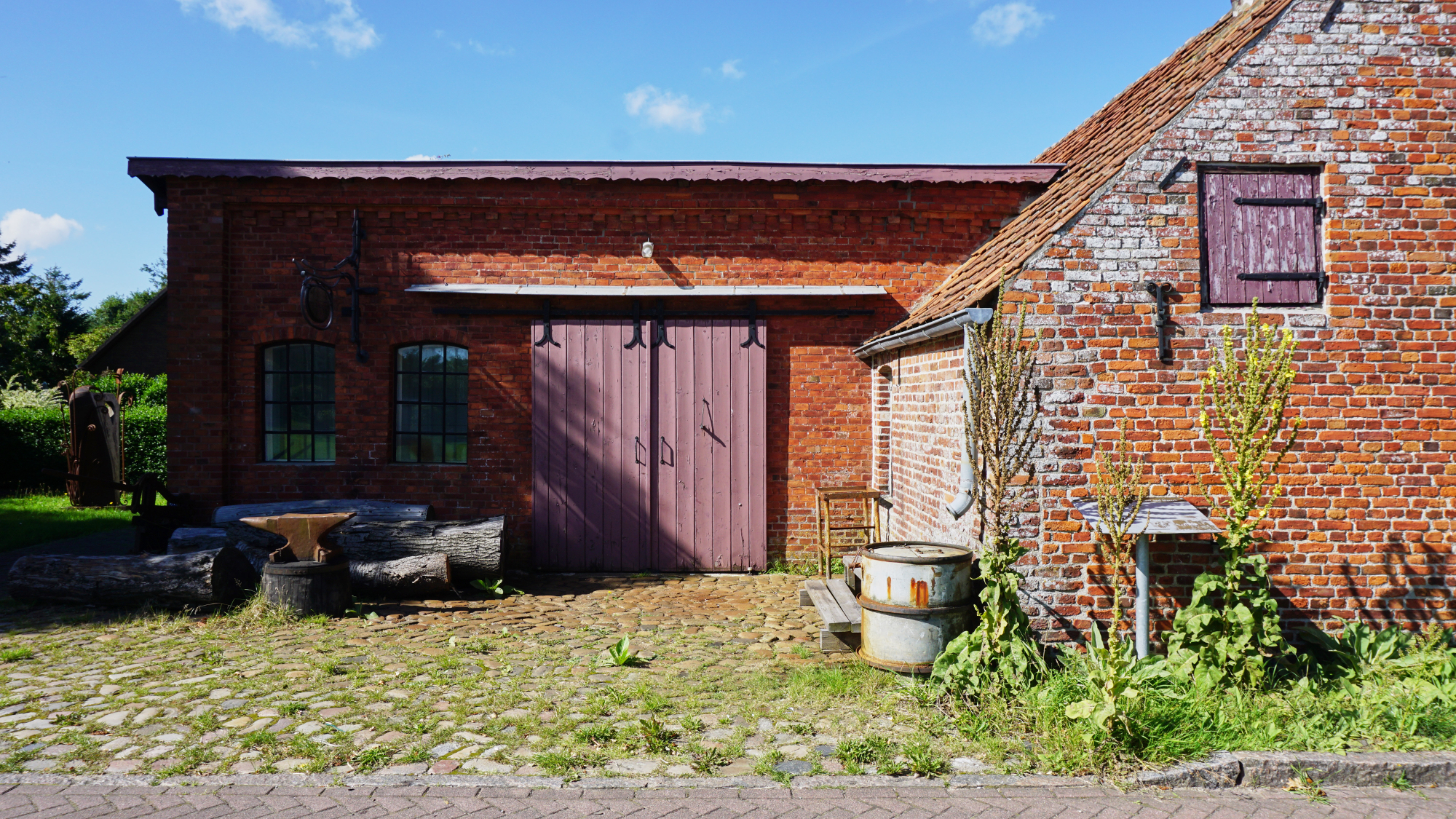
- From top: The service sector in Langenhorn, St. Lawrence Church, Old Forge Monument (opposite St. Lawrence Church)

- Coat of arms

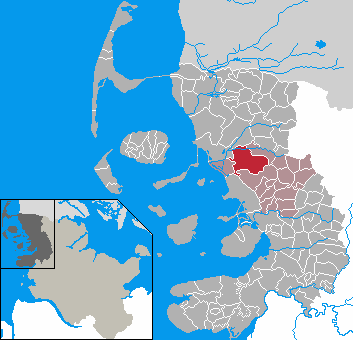
- Location of Langenhorn; Langhorn within Nordfriesland district
- Interactive map of Langenhorn; Langhorn
- Location within Germany Location within Schleswig-Holstein
- Coordinates: 54°40′N 8°55′E
- Country: Germany
- State: Schleswig-Holstein
- District: Nordfriesland

Government
  - Mayor: Olde Oldsen (SPD)

Area
  - Total: 47.4 km^{2} (18.3 sq mi)
- Elevation: 12 m (39 ft)

Population (2025-12-31)
  - Total: 3,341
  - Density: 70.5/km^{2} (183/sq mi)
- Time zone: UTC+01:00 (CET)
  - Summer (DST): UTC+02:00 (CEST)
- Postal codes: 25842
- Dialling codes: 04672
- Vehicle registration: NF
- Website: langenhorn.de

Langenhorn (German pronunciation: [ˈlaŋənhɔʁn]; Danish: Langhorn) is a municipality in the district of Nordfriesland in Schleswig-Holstein, Germany.

== Notable persons ==
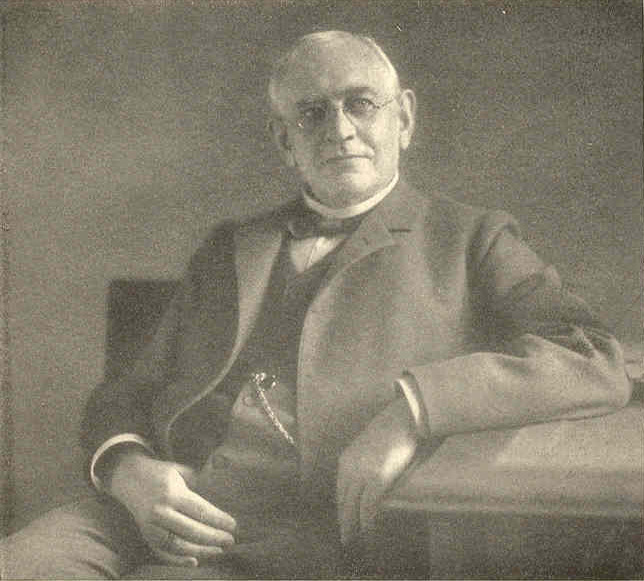
Friedrich Paulsen was born in Langenhorn

- Friedrich Paulsen, (1846–1908) philosopher and educator. A Memorial to Paulsen was placed in St. Lawrence Church with a commemoration ceremony on 16 September 2012; a marketplace in the West-Langenhorn district was renamed Friedrich-Paulsen-Platz.
