= Bredstedt =

Bredstedt Bräist / Bredsted
- Town
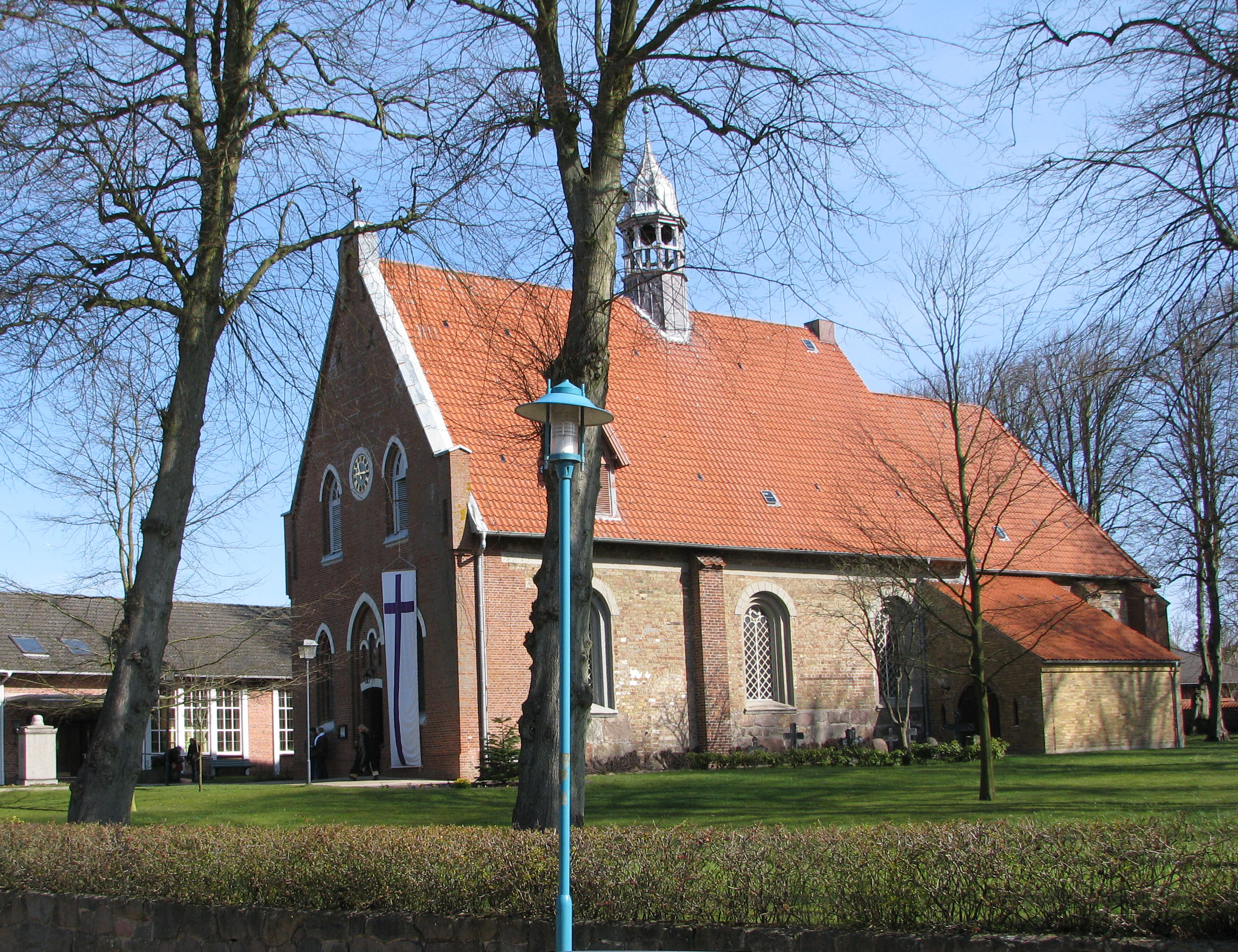
- St. Nicholas church in Bredstedt

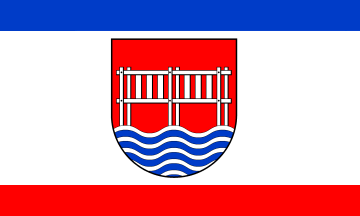
- Flag Coat of arms

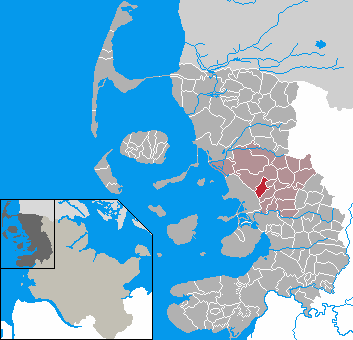
- Location of Bredstedt; Bräist / Bredsted within Nordfriesland district
- Interactive map of Bredstedt; Bräist / Bredsted
- Location within Germany Location within Schleswig-Holstein
- Coordinates: 54°37′12″N 8°57′52″E
- Country: Germany
- State: Schleswig-Holstein
- District: Nordfriesland
- Municipal assoc.: Mittleres Nordfriesland

Government
  - Mayor: Christian Schmidt

Area
  - Total: 9.75 km^{2} (3.76 sq mi)
- Elevation: 7 m (23 ft)

Population (2025-12-31)
  - Total: 5,722
  - Density: 587/km^{2} (1,520/sq mi)
- Time zone: UTC+01:00 (CET)
  - Summer (DST): UTC+02:00 (CEST)
- Postal codes: 25821
- Dialling codes: 04671
- Vehicle registration: NF
- Website: www.bredstedt.de

Bredstedt (German pronunciation: [ˈbʁeːtˌʃtɛt]; Low German: Bredstedt; Danish: Bredsted; North Frisian: Bräist) is a town in the district of Nordfriesland, in Schleswig-Holstein, Germany. It is situated near the North Sea coast, approximately 20 km northwest of Husum.

== Notable people ==
- Christian Albrecht Jensen (1792–1870), portrait painter who depicted most of the leading figures of the Danish Golden Age
- Hans Carl Knudtzon (1751–1823) emigrated to Norway and became a merchant, ship-owner and politician.
