= Meldorf-Land =

Coordinates: 54°05′N 9°04′E

- Former amt
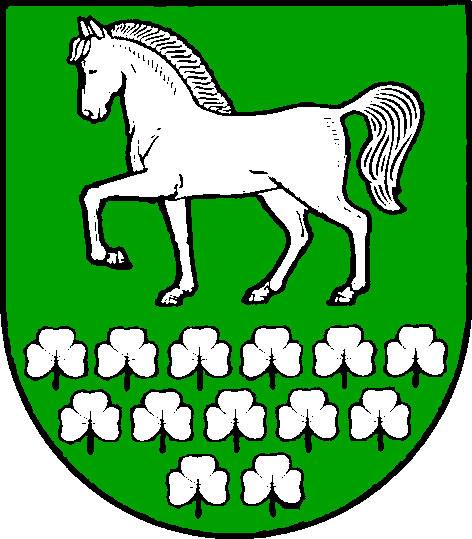
- Coat of arms

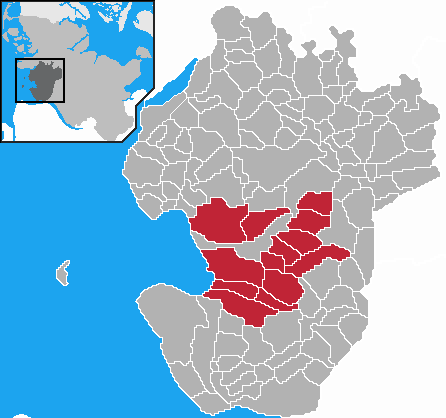
- Map of Dithmarschen highlighting Meldorf-Land
- Country: Germany
- State: Schleswig-Holstein
- District: Dithmarschen
- Disestablished: 25 May 2008
- Region seat: Meldorf

Area
  - Total: 200 km^{2} (77 sq mi)

Kirchspielslandgemeinde Meldorf-Land was an Amt ("collective municipality") in the district of Dithmarschen, in Schleswig-Holstein, Germany. It was situated around Meldorf, which was the seat of the Amt, but not part of it. On 25 May 2008, it merged with the Amt Kirchspielslandgemeinde Albersdorf and the town Meldorf to form the Amt Mitteldithmarschen.

The Amt Kirchspielslandgemeinde Meldorf-Land consisted of the following municipalities (with population in 2005):

1. Bargenstedt (925)
2. Barlt (844)
3. Busenwurth (331)
4. Elpersbüttel (915)
5. Epenwöhrden (808)
6. Gudendorf (425)
7. Krumstedt (556)
8. Nindorf (1,165)
9. Nordermeldorf (649)
10. Odderade (325)
11. Sarzbüttel (735)
12. Windbergen (841)
13. Wolmersdorf (345)
