= Burg-Süderhastedt =

Coordinates: 54°16′N 9°10′E

- Former Amt
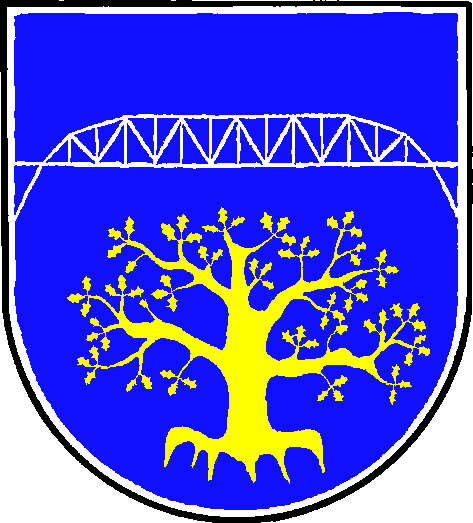
- Coat of arms

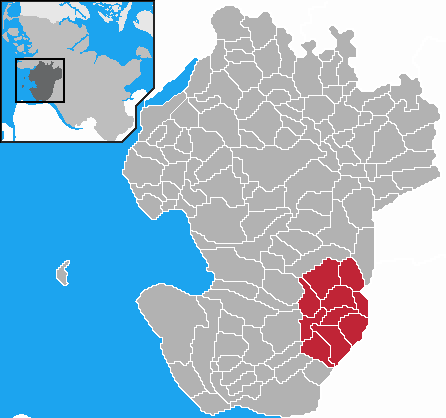
- Map of Dithmarschen highlighting Burg-Süderhastedt
- Country: Germany
- State: Schleswig-Holstein
- District: Dithmarschen
- Disestablished: 1 January 2008
- Region seat: Burg

Area
  - Total: 105 km^{2} (41 sq mi)

Kirchspielslandgemeinde Burg-Süderhastedt was an Amt ("collective municipality") in the district of Dithmarschen, in Schleswig-Holstein, Germany. It was situated near the Kiel Canal, approx. 25 km southeast of Heide, and 20 km northwest of Itzehoe. Its seat was in Burg. In January 2008, it was merged with the Amt Kirchspielslandgemeinde Eddelak-Sankt Michaelisdonn to form the Amt Burg-Sankt Michaelisdonn.

The Amt Kirchspielslandgemeinde Burg-Süderhastedt consisted of the following municipalities (with population in 2005):

1. Brickeln (212)
2. Buchholz (1,115)
3. Burg Dith. (4,364)
4. Eggstedt (836)
5. Frestedt (401)
6. Großenrade (529)
7. Hochdonn (1,249)
8. Kuden (664)
9. Quickborn (199)
10. Süderhastedt (874)
