= List of windmills in Schleswig-Holstein =

A list of windmills in Schleswig-Holstein, Germany.

Location	Name of mill	Type	Built	Notes	Photograph
Achtrup	Jenny	Galerieholländer		House conversion.	
Amrum	Amrumer Mühle	Erdholländer	1771		
Amrum	Bertha	Galerieholländer	1893	House conversion.	
Ascheberg	Langenrader Mühle, Sventana	Galerieholländer	1860		
Barlt	Ursula	Galerieholländer	1875		
Beidenfleth	Hoffnung	Galerieholländer	1813	Destroyed by fire 17 April 2016.	
Bergedorf	Glück Zu	Galerieholländer	1831		
Bergenhusen	Gisela	Kellerholländer	1922	Moved from Meldorf. House converted in 1978.	
Bergenhusen	Margaretha	Holländerwindmühle	1891		
Borgsum	Borigsem	Galerieholländer	1991		
Braak	Braaker Mühle	Galerieholländer	1850		
Brodau	Brodauer Mühle	Galerieholländer	1864	Burnt down 17 November 2005	
Dellstedt	Fortuna	Galerieholländer	1926		
Dörpling	Fortuna	Kellerholländer	1853		
Eckernförde	Grüne Mühle	Galerieholländer	1829	Demolished 1911	
Eddelak	Gott Mit Uns	Galerieholländer	1865		
Eutin	Moder Grau	Galerieholländer	1850		
Eutin	Anna	Galerieholländer	1803	Dismantled 1902, rebuilt at Süderhastedt 1903	
Flensburg	Bergmühle	Galerieholländer	1792		
Flensburg	St. Johannis Mühle	Galerieholländer	1808		
Fockendorf	Fockendorfer Mühle	Spinnkopfmühle	1850	Moved to Molfsee in 1966	
Friedrichskoog	Vergissmeinnicht	Galerieholländer	1860		
Garding	Fortuna	Galerieholländer	1870		
Garding	Emanuel	Erdholländer	1857	House conversion.	
Grebin	Grebiner Mühle, Wagria	Kellerholländer	1851		
Gettorf	Gettorfer Mühle	Galerieholländer	1869		
Grödersby	Grödersbyer Mühle	Galerieholländer	1888	converted to vacation rental apartments	
Groß Wittensee	Auguste	Kellerholländer	1874		
Hamburg	Feldentwasserungsmühle	Kokermühle	c. 1780		
Hamburg	Riepenburger Mühle	Galerieholländer	1828		
Hamburg	Osdorf	Galerieholländer	1890		
Hamburg	Reitbrook	Galerieholländer			
Hamburg	Johanna	Galerieholländer	1875		
Hamfelde	Pirsch Mühle	Galerieholländer	1876		
Hasselberg	Johannesmühle	Galerieholländer	1869'	House conversion.	
Hemmingstedt	Margaretha	Kellerholländer	1858		
Henstedt-Ulzburg	Götzburg	Kellerholländer			
Hochdonn	Aurora	Galerieholländer	1883		
Hollingstedt	Hollingstedter Mühle	Galerieholländer	1865	Moved to Molfsee in 1973	
Husberg	Elfriede	Galerieholländer	1838		
Itzehoe	Suder Mühle	Galerieholländer	1870		
Joldelund	Joldeluder Mühle	Kellerholländer	1771	House conversion.	
Kappeln	Amanda	Galerieholländer	1888	Tallest windmill in Schleswig-Holstein.	
Keitum		Galerieholländer	1870s	Demolished 1911	
Klein Barkau	Klein Barkauer Mühle	Galerieholländer	1870		
Kogel	Marie	Erdholländer	1898		
Kollmar		Galerieholländer	1815	Burnt down 19 November 2003	
Krokau	Krokauer Mühle	Galerieholländer	1872		
Krumstedt	Olivia	Kellerholländer	1848		
Langenhorn	Westermöhl	Galerieholländer	1859		
Lauenburg	Lauenburger Mühle	Galerieholländer			
Lepahn	Lepahner Mühle	Galerieholländer	c. 1885		
Lemkenhafen	Jachen Flünk	Galerieholländer	1787		
Lindau	Lindaumühlenholz	Galerieholländer	1837	House conversion.	
Loose		Galerieholländer	1858	Demolished in ????, New mill built on base in 2001 (see below)	
Loose	Mohrbergmühle	Galerieholländer	2001	Originally built at Rostock, Mecklenburg-Vorpommern in 1864.	
Marne		Galerieholländer			
Medelby	Vanessa	Galerieholländer	1859		
Meldorf	Nordermühle	Kellerholländer	1863		
Meldorf	Südermühle	Galerieholländer			
Meldorf		Kellerholländer	1887	Moved to Bergenhusen, 1922.	
Molfsee	Algermissener Mühle	Bockwindmühle	1965	Moved from Algermissen, Lower Saxony.	
Molfsee	Hollingstedter Mühle	Galerieholländer	1973	Moved from Hollingstedt.	
Molfsee	Fockendorfer Mühle	Spinnkopfmühle	1966	Moved from Fockendorf.	
Munkbrarup	Hoffnung	Kellerholländer	1868		
Neufeld	Immanuel	Kellerholländer	1850		
Nieby	Charlotte	Kellerholländer	1826		
Nordermeldorf	Thalingburen	Galerieholländer	1882	House conversion	
Nordstrand	Engel	Galerieholländer	1891		
Nübbel	Anna	Kellerholländer	1904		
Nübelfeld	Hoffnung	Kellerholländer	1841	House conversion	
Oldenswort	Catharina	Kellerholländer	1786	House conversion.	
Oldsum	Oldsumer Mühle	Galerieholländer	1901	House conversion.	
Osterbargum	Aeolus	Galerieholländer	1887		
Pellworm	Nordermühle	Galerieholländer	1777		
Petersdorf - Fehmarn	Südermühle	Galerieholländer	1893	Converted to restaurant.	
Reinbek	Hannemann's Mühle	Galerieholländer	1996	Moved from Wagersrott.	
Rieseby	Anna	Galerieholländer	1994		
Sankt Michaelisdonn	Edda	Kellerholländer	1842		
Schönberg	Schönberger Mühle	Galerieholländer	1827		
Siebenbäumen	Siebenbäumener Mühle	Galerieholländer	1885		
Siek		Galerieholländer	1901		
Söby-Holzdorf	Soby Mühle	Galerieholländer	1886		
Sörup	Renata	Galerieholländer	1883		
Stördorf	Schöpfmühle Honigfleth	Kokermühle		Only hollow post mill in working order in Germany.	
Strübbel		Holländerwindmühle		Moved to Ditzum, Lower Saxony in 1992.	
Struckum	Fortuna	Sockelgeschoßholländer	1806		
Struxdorf	Hollmühle	Galerieholländer	1843		
Süderhastedt	Anna	Galerieholländer	1904		
Tarp	Antje	Galerieholländer	1882		
Timmendorfer Strand	Der Reporter	Galerieholländer	1846		
Todenbüttel	Senta	Galerieholländer	1871	House conversion	
Uetersen	Langes Mühle	Sockelgeschoßholländer	c. 1772	Burnt down 1889. Converted base used as café.	
Unewatt	Fortuna	Galerieholländer	1878		
Wagersrott		Galerieholländer	1870	Moved to Reinbek, 1996.	
Wangels	Farve	Erdholländer	1828	House conversion	
Weddingstedt	Aurora	Galerieholländer	1832		
Westerdiechstrich	Margaretha, Von Vorn	Sockelgeschoßholländer	1845	Converted to hotel/restaurant.	
Westerhever		Galerieholländer	1786	Moved to Rieseby 1994	
Westerholz	Steinadler	Galerieholländer	1876		
Wilster	Aurora, Rumflether Mühle	Galerieholländer	1872		
Wöhrden	Germania	Sockelgeschoßholländer	1847	House conversion	
Wrixum	Wrixumer Mühle	Kellerholländer	1851		
Wyk	Venti Amica	Galerieholländer	1879	House converted in 1922	
Wyk	Pfahlmühle	Bockwindmühle	1924		
Zarpen	Zarpener Mühle	Gallerieholländer	c. 1890		

== Notes ==
Known building dates are in bold text. Non-bold text denotes first known date.
