= Eddelak-Sankt Michaelisdonn =

Coordinates: 53°59′N 9°07′E

- Former amt
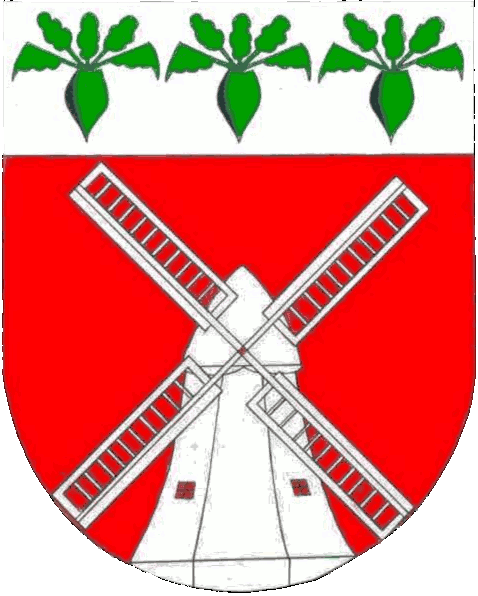
- Coat of arms

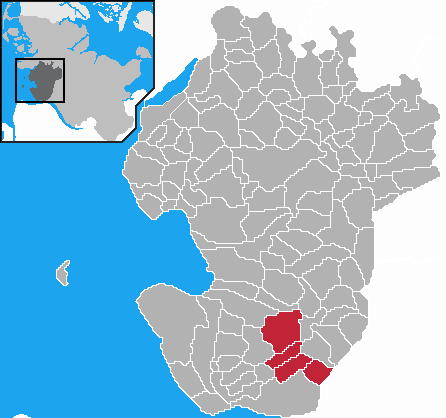
- Map of Dithmarschen highlighting Eddelak-Sankt Michaelisdonn
- Country: Germany
- State: Schleswig-Holstein
- District: Dithmarschen
- Disestablished: 1 January 2008
- Region seat: Sankt Michaelisdonn

Area
  - Total: 50 km^{2} (19 sq mi)

Kirchspielslandgemeinde Eddelak-Sankt Michaelisdonn was an Amt ("collective municipality") in the district of Dithmarschen, in Schleswig-Holstein, Germany. It was situated near the Kiel Canal, approx. 25 km south of Heide, and 10 km north of Brunsbüttel. Its seat was in Sankt Michaelisdonn. In January 2008, it was merged with the Amt Kirchspielslandgemeinde Burg-Süderhastedt to form the Amt Burg-Sankt Michaelisdonn.

The Amt Kirchspielslandgemeinde Eddelak-Sankt Michaelisdonn consisted of the following municipalities (with population in 2005):

1. Averlak (640)
2. Dingen (714)
3. Eddelak (1.462)
4. Sankt Michaelisdonn (3.728)
