= Albersdorf (Amt Kirchspielslandgemeinde) =

Coordinates: 54°09′N 9°17′E

- Former amt
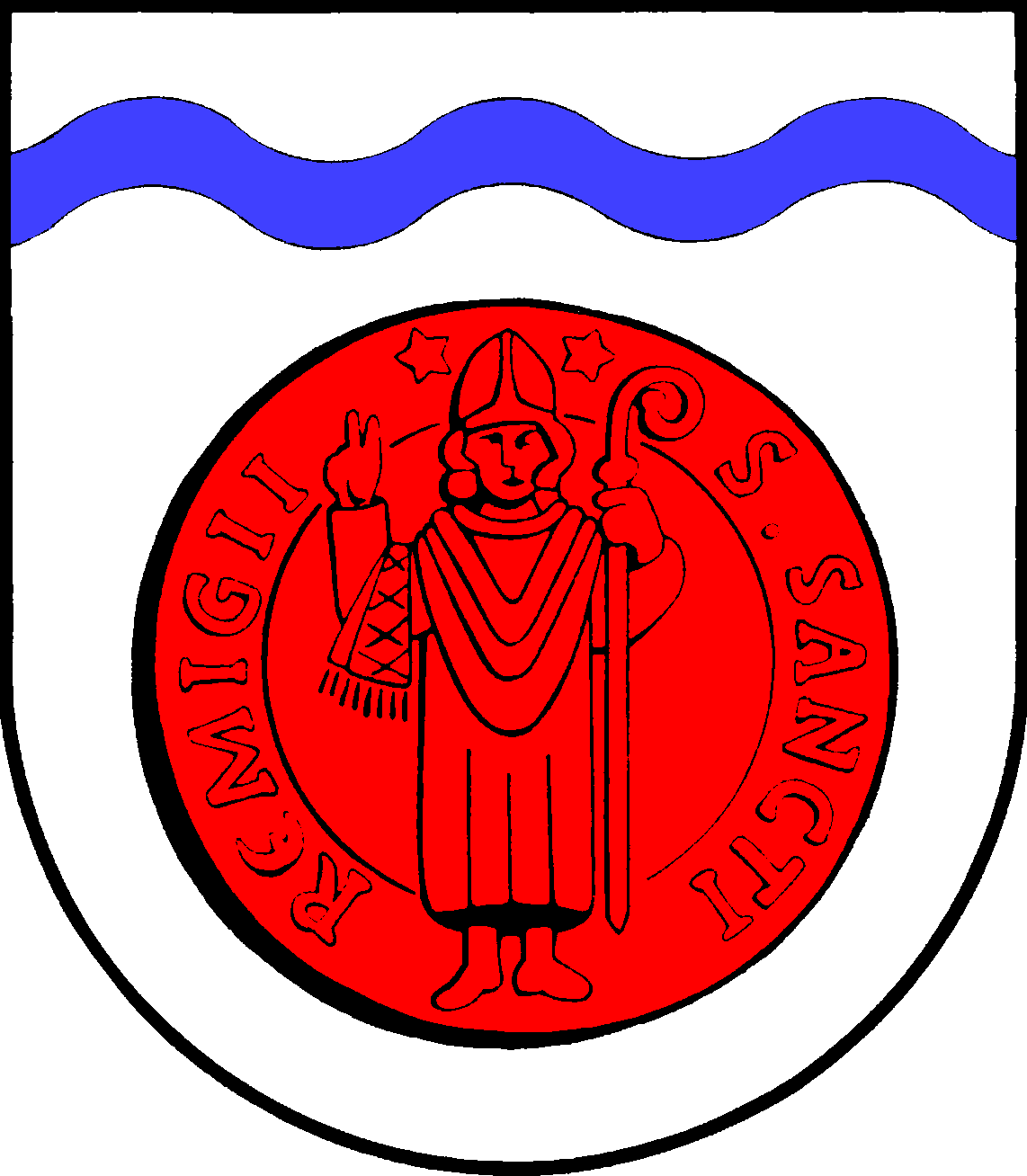
- Coat of arms

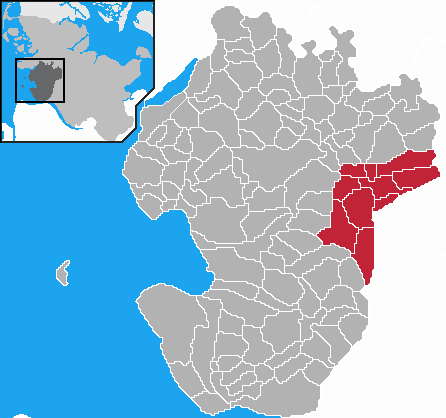
- Map of Dithmarschen highlighting Albersdorf
- Country: Germany
- State: Schleswig-Holstein
- District: Dithmarschen
- Disestablished: 25 May 2008
- Region seat: Albersdorf

Area
  - Total: 120 km^{2} (46 sq mi)

Kirchspielslandgemeinde Albersdorf was an Amt ("collective municipality") in the district of Dithmarschen, in Schleswig-Holstein, Germany. On 25 May 2008, it merged with the Amt Kirchspielslandgemeinde Meldorf-Land and the town Meldorf to form the Amt Mitteldithmarschen. Its seat was in Albersdorf.

== Municipalities ==
The Amt Kirchspielslandgemeinde Albersdorf consisted of the following municipalities (with population in 2005):

1. Albersdorf (3,588)
2. Arkebek (250)
3. Bunsoh (871)
4. Immenstedt (97)
5. Offenbüttel (283)
6. Osterrade (462)
7. Schafstedt (1,343)
8. Schrum (77)
9. Tensbüttel-Röst (692)
10. Wennbüttel (77)
