= Dingen =

Dingen may refer to:

- Dingen, Dithmarschen in Germany
- Dingen, Groningen in the Netherlands
