= Hutberg =

Hutberg may refer to:

- Hutberg (Dürrhennersdorf), a mountain of Saxony, Germany
- Hutberg (Oderwitz), a mountain of Saxony, Germany
