= Immenstedt =

Immenstedt refers to the following municipalities in Schleswig-Holstein, Germany:

- Immenstedt, Dithmarschen
- Immenstedt, Nordfriesland
