= Husberg =

Husberg is a surname. Notable people with the surname include:

- Amanda Husberg (born 1940), American composer of hymns
- Maud Husberg (1934–2008), Swedish television presenter and announcer
- Rolf Husberg (1908–1998), Swedish film director, cinematographer, screenwriter, and actor

== See also ==
- Hutberg (disambiguation)
