= Wennbüttel =

- Municipality
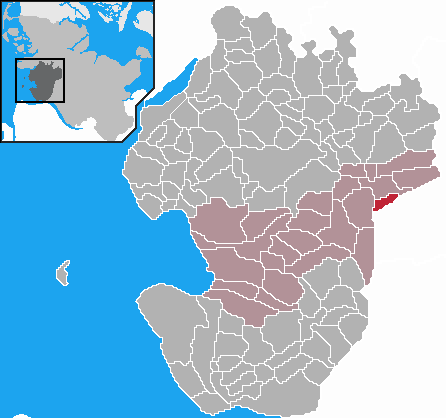
- Location of Wennbüttel within Dithmarschen district
- Interactive map of Wennbüttel
- Location within Germany Location within Schleswig-Holstein
- Coordinates: 54°7′N 9°19′E
- Country: Germany
- State: Schleswig-Holstein
- District: Dithmarschen
- Municipal assoc.: Mitteldithmarschen

Government
  - Mayor: Jens Struve

Area
  - Total: 4.59 km^{2} (1.77 sq mi)
- Elevation: 17 m (56 ft)

Population (2025-12-31)
  - Total: 93
  - Density: 20/km^{2} (52/sq mi)
- Time zone: UTC+01:00 (CET)
  - Summer (DST): UTC+02:00 (CEST)
- Postal codes: 25767
- Dialling codes: 04835
- Vehicle registration: HEI
- Website: www.gemeinde-wennbuettel.de

Wennbüttel (German pronunciation: [ˈvɛnbʏtl̩]) is a municipality in the district of Dithmarschen, in Schleswig-Holstein, Germany.

== See also ==
- Albersdorf (Amt Kirchspielslandgemeinde)
