= Burg-Sankt Michaelisdonn =

- Amt
- Flag Coat of arms

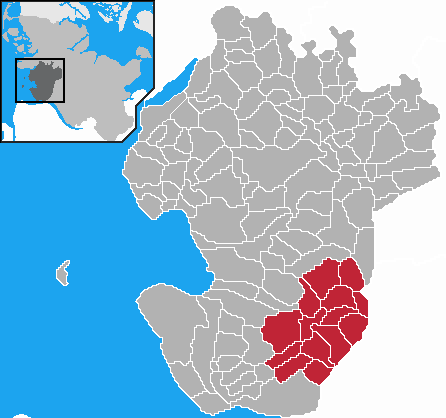
- Map of Dithmarschen highlighting Burg-Sankt Michaelisdonn
- Interactive map of Burg-Sankt Michaelisdonn
- Location within Germany Location within Schleswig-Holstein
- Coordinates: 53°59′53″N 9°15′43″E
- Country: Germany
- State: Schleswig-Holstein
- District: Dithmarschen
- Founded: 2008
- Seat: Burg
- Subdivisions: 14 municipalities

Government
  - Mayor: Hans-Henning Beeck

Area
  - Total: 153.24 km^{2} (59.17 sq mi)

Population (2025-12-31)
  - Total: 15,563
  - Density: 101.56/km^{2} (263.04/sq mi)
- Time zone: UTC+01:00 (CET)
  - Summer (DST): UTC+02:00 (CEST)
- Website: amt-burg-st-michaelisdonn.de

Burg-Sankt Michaelisdonn is an Amt ("collective municipality") in the district of Dithmarschen, in Schleswig-Holstein, Germany. Its seat is in Burg. It was formed on 1 January 2008 from the former Ämter Kirchspielslandgemeinde Burg-Süderhastedt and Kirchspielslandgemeinde Eddelak-Sankt Michaelisdonn.

The Amt Burg-Sankt Michaelisdonn consists of the following municipalities:

1. Averlak
2. Brickeln
3. Buchholz
4. Burg Dith.
5. Dingen
6. Eddelak
7. Eggstedt
8. Frestedt
9. Großenrade
10. Hochdonn
11. Kuden
12. Quickborn
13. Sankt Michaelisdonn
14. Süderhastedt
