= Bunsoh =

- Municipality
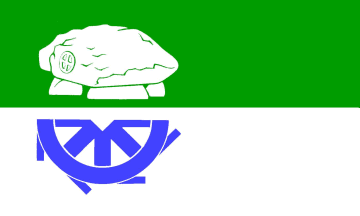
- Flag Coat of arms

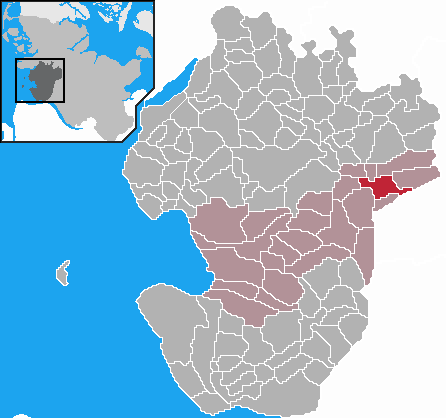
- Location of Bunsoh within Dithmarschen district
- Interactive map of Bunsoh
- Location within Germany Location within Schleswig-Holstein
- Coordinates: 54°10′N 09°20′E
- Country: Germany
- State: Schleswig-Holstein
- District: Dithmarschen
- Municipal assoc.: Mitteldithmarschen
- Subdivisions: 2

Government
  - Mayor: Rainer Plähn (FWB)

Area
  - Total: 11.75 km^{2} (4.54 sq mi)
- Elevation: 9 m (30 ft)

Population (2025-12-31)
  - Total: 766
  - Density: 65.2/km^{2} (169/sq mi)
- Time zone: UTC+01:00 (CET)
  - Summer (DST): UTC+02:00 (CEST)
- Postal codes: 25767
- Dialling codes: 04835
- Vehicle registration: HEI

Bunsoh (German pronunciation: [ˈbʊnzoː]) is a municipality in the district of Dithmarschen, in Schleswig-Holstein, Germany.

== See also ==
- Albersdorf (Amt Kirchspielslandgemeinde)
