= Albersdorf =

- Municipality
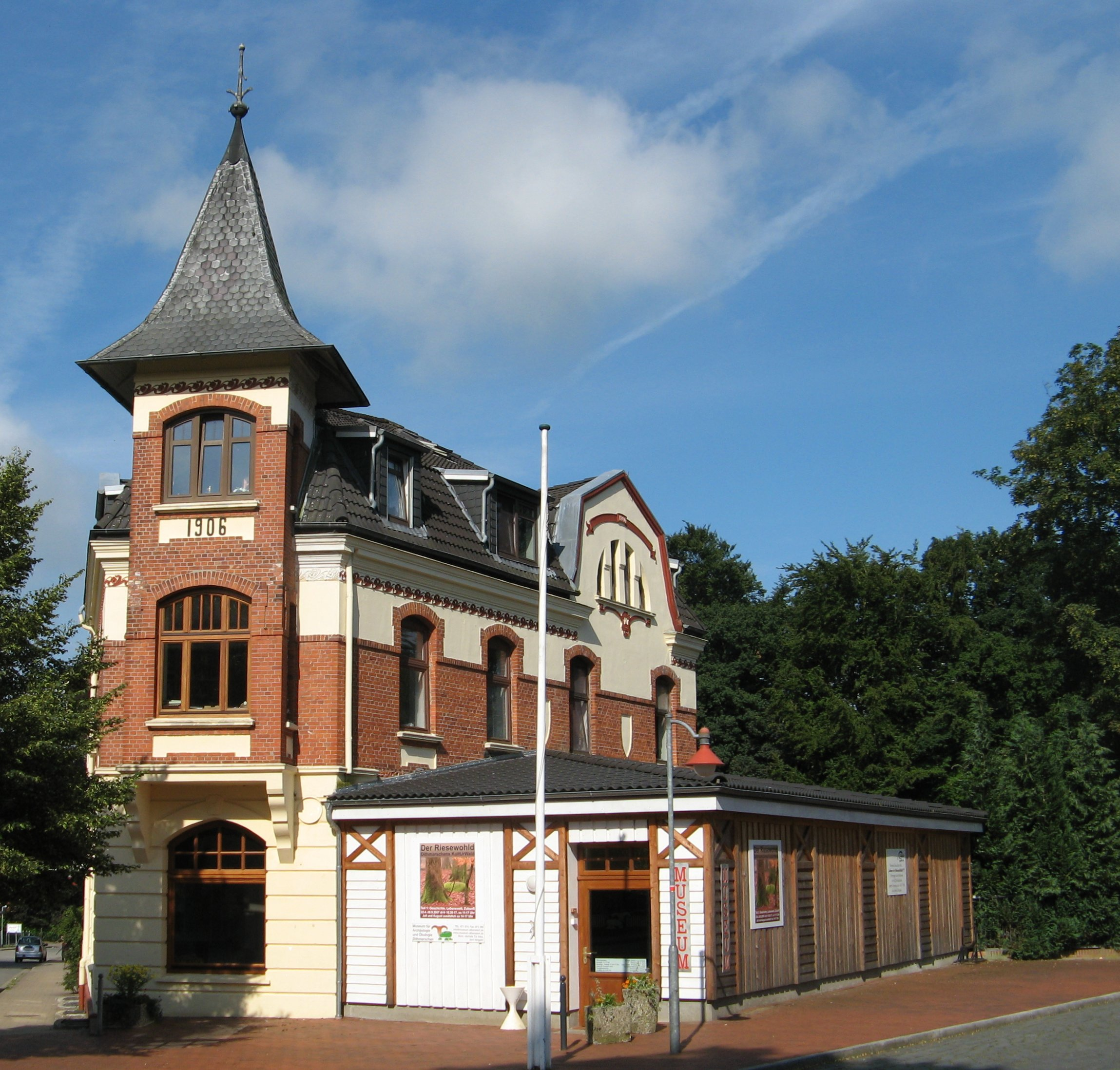
- Albersdorf archeological museum

- Flag Coat of arms

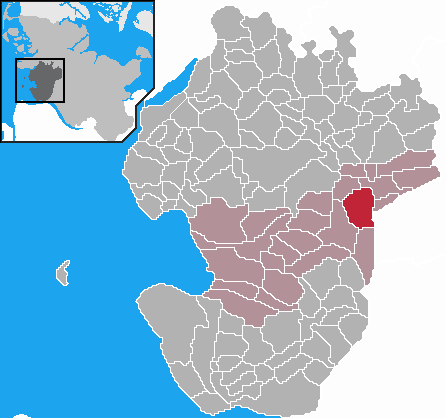
- Location of Albersdorf within Dithmarschen district
- Interactive map of Albersdorf
- Location within Germany Location within Schleswig-Holstein
- Coordinates: 54°8′44″N 9°17′15″E
- Country: Germany
- State: Schleswig-Holstein
- District: Dithmarschen
- Municipal assoc.: Mitteldithmarschen

Government
  - Mayor: Manfred Trube (CDU)

Area
  - Total: 17.13 km^{2} (6.61 sq mi)
- Elevation: 42 m (138 ft)

Population (2025-12-31)
  - Total: 3,715
  - Density: 216.9/km^{2} (561.7/sq mi)
- Time zone: UTC+01:00 (CET)
  - Summer (DST): UTC+02:00 (CEST)
- Postal codes: 25767
- Dialling codes: 04835
- Vehicle registration: HEI
- Website: www.albersdorf.de

Albersdorf is a municipality in the district of Dithmarschen, in Schleswig-Holstein, Germany. It is situated near the Kiel Canal, approx. 14 km southeast of Heide. The place was first mentioned in 1281 under the name Aluerdesdorpe, meaning "village of the old custodian." Albersdorf is part of the Amt Mitteldithmarschen.

== Geography ==
There are many tumuli from the Neolithic and the Bronze Age in this region. It is situated in the east of the Dithmarschen, close to the Kiel Canal. The area is called a geest—a sandy heathland with numerous hills and forests. Albersdorf is a spa town visited for its pure air. It is therefore a popular touristic centre of the Dithmarschen.

== Economy ==
The biggest employer in Albersdorf was the Bundeswehr with more than 780 jobs. However, in November 2007 the army base was closed. Now it's used by many companies to store materials.

== Culture ==
The Archeologic-Ecological Center tries to recreate the cultural landscape of the Neolithic 5,000 years ago, on the area of 40,000 m^{2}. The aim is to create a pasture, settled by the first farmers. In 1999 the center has opened a Stone Age village in which visitors are shown the technics of that time. In the town centre there is the spa park with an open-air stage for 2,000 people.

In Albersdorf there is the oldest folk high school on German soil, which is still open today. At the time it was founded, Holstein was under Danish administration. In the rest of Germany, folk high schools were not introduced until the formation of the Weimar Republic in 1919.

On March 29, 1933, Adolf Hitler was made an honorary citizen of Albersdorf.

== Notable events ==
For more than a century now, Albersdorf celebrates the Pfingstvolksfest (Pentecost festival), visited by several thousand people each year.

== See also ==
- Albersdorf (Amt Kirchspielslandgemeinde)
