= Arkebek =

- Municipality
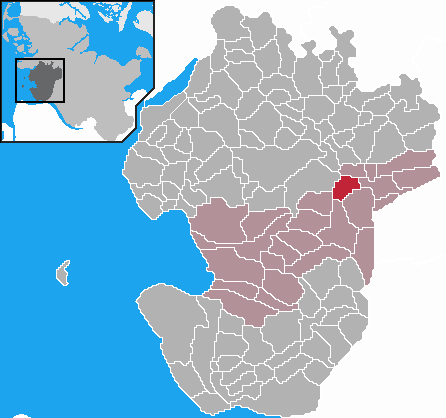
- Location of Arkebek within Dithmarschen district
- Interactive map of Arkebek
- Location within Germany Location within Schleswig-Holstein
- Coordinates: 54°09′33″N 09°14′52″E
- Country: Germany
- State: Schleswig-Holstein
- District: Dithmarschen
- Municipal assoc.: Mitteldithmarschen
- Subdivisions: 3

Government
  - Mayor: Martin-Heinrich Dallmeier-Tießen

Area
  - Total: 6.92 km^{2} (2.67 sq mi)
- Elevation: 47 m (154 ft)

Population (2025-12-31)
  - Total: 220
  - Density: 32/km^{2} (82/sq mi)
- Time zone: UTC+01:00 (CET)
  - Summer (DST): UTC+02:00 (CEST)
- Postal codes: 25767
- Dialling codes: 04835
- Vehicle registration: HEI
- Website: www.arkebek.de

Arkebek (German pronunciation: [ˈaʁkəbeːk]) is a municipality in the district of Dithmarschen, in Schleswig-Holstein, Germany.

== See also ==
- Albersdorf (Amt Kirchspielslandgemeinde)
