= Gustav Frenssen =

German novelist (1863–1945)

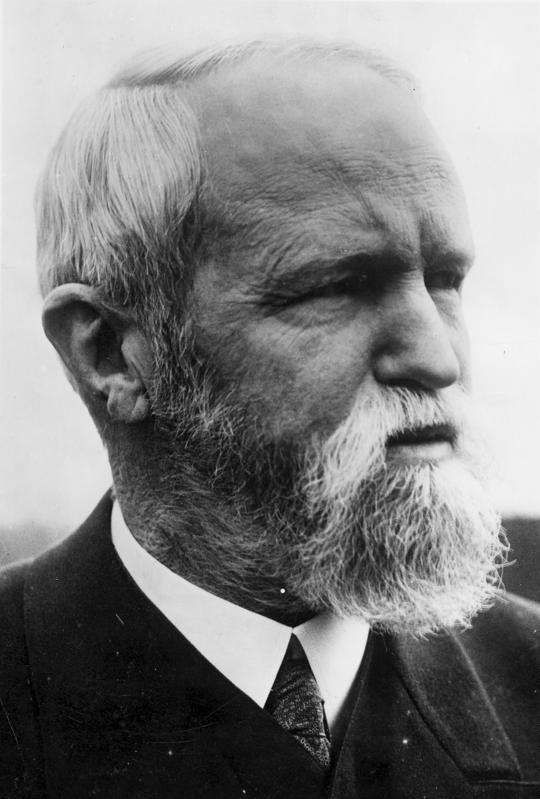
- Gustav Frenssen (German Federal Archives)
- Born: 19 October 1863; Barlt, Duchy of Holstein
- Died: 11 April 1945 (aged 81); Barlt, Nazi Germany
- Occupation: Novelist
- Writing career
- Genres: Regionalism, Heimatkunst

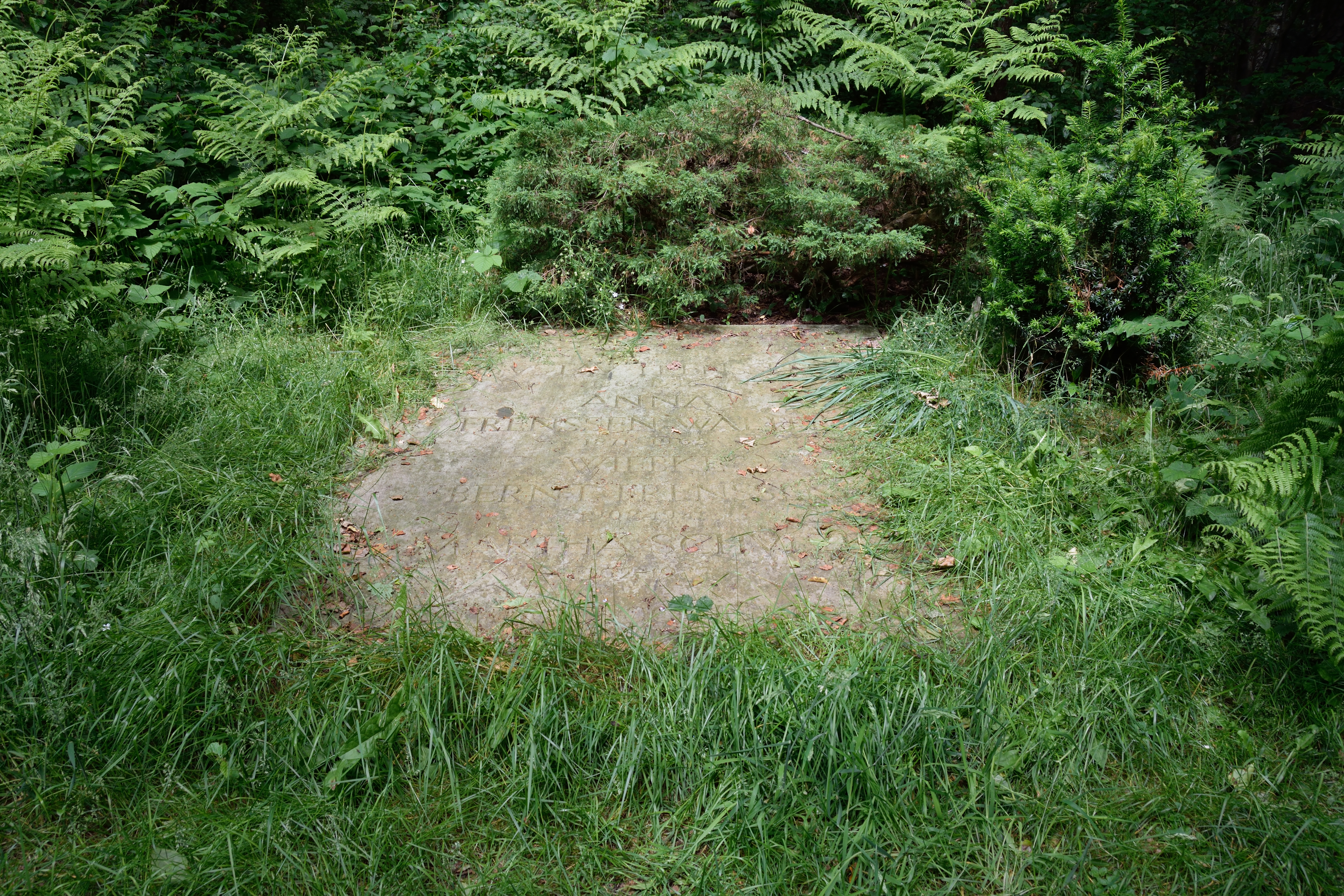
Frenssen's grave on the Wodansberg (Wodan's Mountain)

Gustav Frenssen (19 October 1863 – 11 April 1945) was a German novelist. He wrote patriotically about his native country and promoted Heimatkunst (regionalism) in literature.

== Biography ==
Frenssen was born in the village of Barlt, in the Duchy of Holstein, then under the control of the Kingdom of Denmark. He was educated at the universities of Tübingen, Berlin and Kiel. He took orders and from 1892 to 1902 was pastor at Hemme, taking his degree as doctor of theology at Heidelberg in 1903. But he had already for some years been known as a writer of novels, and in 1902, a year after his great success with Jörn Uhl (1901), he gave up his pastorate and devoted all his time to literature.

In his later years, he abandoned Christianity because Christian morals were in conflict with his racialism. Instead, he turned to a form of Germanic Neopaganism which also suited his liberal views on sexuality.

While the Nazis were coming to power, and afterwards, Frenssen showed great loyalty to the party. He was vocally anti-Semitic and supported euthanasia.

== Writings ==
- Dorfpredigten ("Village Sermons", 1899–1902; Vandenhoed & Ruprecht, Göttingen; the 1900 cover page indicates that he was pastor in Hemme, Holstein)
- Jörn Uhl (1901)
- Die Sandgräfin (1895, 3rd ed. 1902)
- Die drei Getreuen (1898)
- Das Heimatsfest, a play (1903)
- Hilligenlei ("Holyland", 1905)
- Peter Moor's Fahrt nach Süd-West (1906), on the Herero and Namaqua Genocide, a very colonialistic and racist story about a soldier in the German war (1904–05) in Namibia; translated into English by Margaret May Ward in 1908; one of the most popular novels of the Third Reich
- Klaus Henrich Baas (1909)
- Sönke Erichsen, a play (1912)
- Die Brüder (1918)
- Der Pastor von Poggsee ("The Pastor of Poggsee", 1921)
- Otto Babendiek ("The Anvil")
- Grübeleien, observations (3 vols.)
- Recht ~~oder Unrecht~~: Mein Land, a defense of Germany's actions in World War II ("Right ~~or Wrong~~: My Country," the title is also a popular saying, cf. patriotism; 1940)
