= Mitteldithmarschen =

- Amt
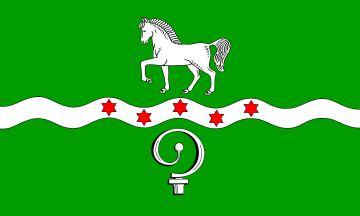
- Flag Coat of arms

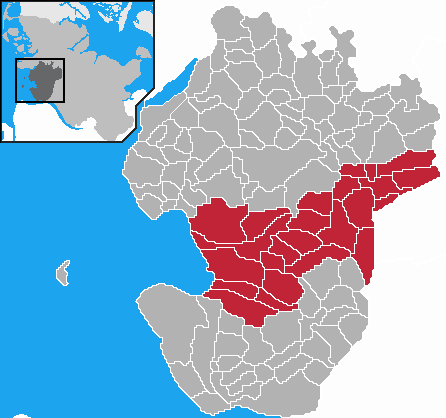
- Map of Dithmarschen highlighting Mitteldithmarschen
- Interactive map of Mitteldithmarschen
- Location within Germany Location within Schleswig-Holstein
- Coordinates: 54°05′N 9°04′E
- Country: Germany
- State: Schleswig-Holstein
- District: Dithmarschen
- Founded: 2008
- Seat: Meldorf
- Subdivisions: 24 municipalities

Government
  - Mayor: Sven Karstens

Area
  - Total: 339.72 km^{2} (131.17 sq mi)

Population (2025-12-31)
  - Total: 23,216
  - Density: 68.339/km^{2} (177.00/sq mi)
- Time zone: UTC+01:00 (CET)
  - Summer (DST): UTC+02:00 (CEST)
- Website: mitteldithmarschen.de

Mitteldithmarschen is an Amt ("collective municipality") in the district of Dithmarschen, in Schleswig-Holstein, Germany. Its seat is in Meldorf. It was formed on 25 May 2008 from the former Ämter Kirchspielslandgemeinde Albersdorf, Kirchspielslandgemeinde Meldorf-Land and the town Meldorf.

The Amt Mitteldithmarschen consists of the following municipalities:

1. Albersdorf
2. Arkebek
3. Bargenstedt
4. Barlt
5. Bunsoh
6. Busenwurth
7. Elpersbüttel
8. Epenwöhrden
9. Gudendorf
10. Immenstedt
11. Krumstedt
12. Meldorf
13. Nindorf
14. Nordermeldorf
15. Odderade
16. Offenbüttel
17. Osterrade
18. Sarzbüttel
19. Schafstedt
20. Schrum
21. Tensbüttel-Röst
22. Wennbüttel
23. Windbergen
24. Wolmersdorf
