= Tensbüttel-Röst =

- Municipality
- Coat of arms

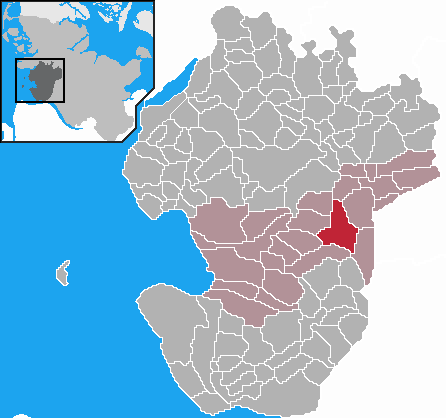
- Location of Tensbüttel-Röst within Dithmarschen district
- Interactive map of Tensbüttel-Röst
- Location within Germany Location within Schleswig-Holstein
- Coordinates: 54°06′N 09°13′E
- Country: Germany
- State: Schleswig-Holstein
- District: Dithmarschen
- Municipal assoc.: Mitteldithmarschen
- Subdivisions: 2

Government
  - Mayor: Birte Hargens

Area
  - Total: 19.36 km^{2} (7.47 sq mi)
- Elevation: 13 m (43 ft)

Population (2025-12-31)
  - Total: 647
  - Density: 33.4/km^{2} (86.6/sq mi)
- Time zone: UTC+01:00 (CET)
  - Summer (DST): UTC+02:00 (CEST)
- Postal codes: 25767
- Dialling codes: 04835
- Vehicle registration: HEI
- Website: www.tensbuettel-roest.de

Tensbüttel-Röst is a municipality in the district of Dithmarschen, in Schleswig-Holstein, Germany.

== See also ==
- Albersdorf (Amt Kirchspielslandgemeinde)
