= Miele (river) =

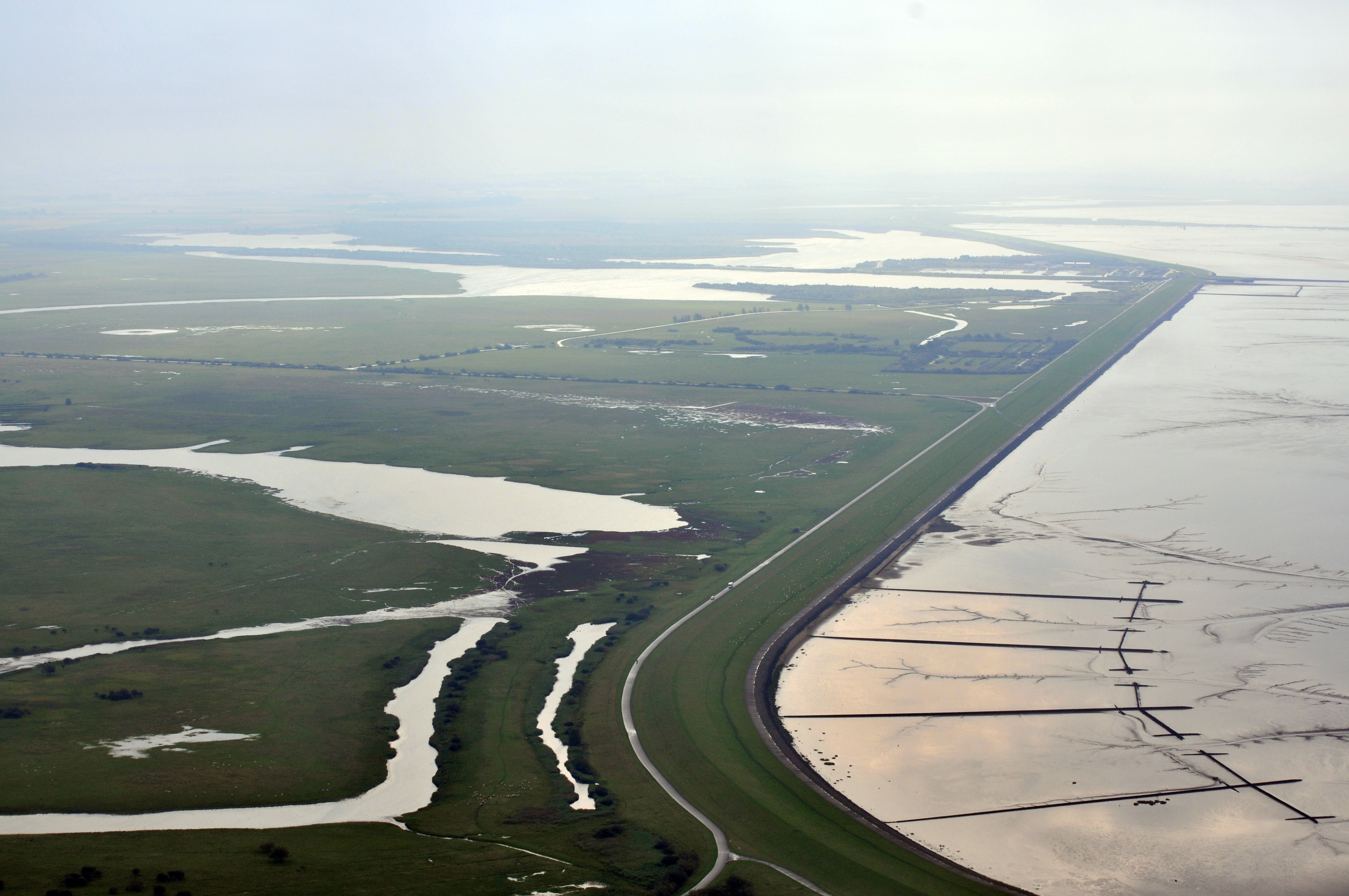
- The lower reaches of Miele

Location
- Country: Germany
- States: Schleswig-Holstein

Physical characteristics
- Mouth
  - location: North Sea
  - coordinates: 54.0927°N 8.9503°E

Miele is a river of Schleswig-Holstein, Germany. It flows into the North Sea near Meldorf.

== See also ==
- List of rivers of Schleswig-Holstein
