= Schrum =

- Municipality
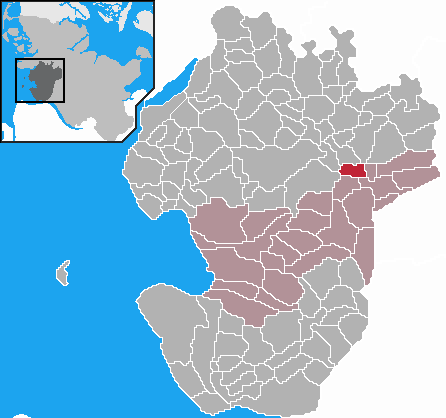
- Location of Schrum within Dithmarschen district
- Interactive map of Schrum
- Location within Germany Location within Schleswig-Holstein
- Coordinates: 54°11′9″N 9°15′16″E
- Country: Germany
- State: Schleswig-Holstein
- District: Dithmarschen
- Municipal assoc.: Mitteldithmarschen

Government
  - Mayor: Ebe Thomsen

Area
  - Total: 5.01 km^{2} (1.93 sq mi)
- Elevation: 78.81 m (258.6 ft)

Population (2025-12-31)
  - Total: 77
  - Density: 15/km^{2} (40/sq mi)
- Time zone: UTC+01:00 (CET)
  - Summer (DST): UTC+02:00 (CEST)
- Postal codes: 25782
- Dialling codes: 04835
- Vehicle registration: HEI
- Website: www.gemeinde-schrum.de

Schrum (German pronunciation: [ʃʁʊm]) is a municipality in the district of Dithmarschen, in Schleswig-Holstein, Germany.

== See also ==
- Albersdorf (Amt Kirchspielslandgemeinde)
