= Sarzbüttel =

- Municipality
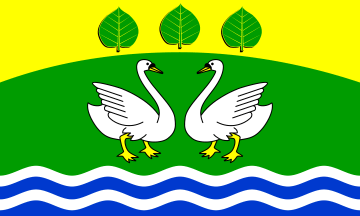
- Flag Coat of arms

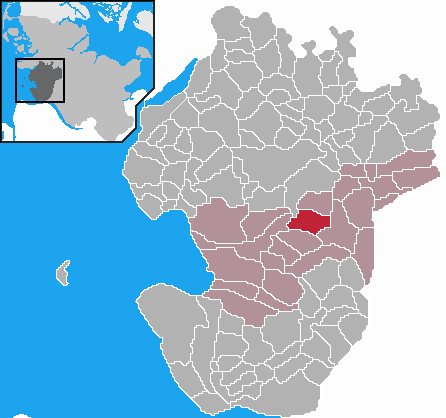
- Location of Sarzbüttel within Dithmarschen district
- Interactive map of Sarzbüttel
- Location within Germany Location within Schleswig-Holstein
- Coordinates: 54°7′N 9°11′E
- Country: Germany
- State: Schleswig-Holstein
- District: Dithmarschen
- Municipal assoc.: Mitteldithmarschen

Government
  - Mayor: Hermann Busch (SPD)

Area
  - Total: 13.39 km^{2} (5.17 sq mi)
- Elevation: 10 m (33 ft)

Population (2025-12-31)
  - Total: 717
  - Density: 53.5/km^{2} (139/sq mi)
- Time zone: UTC+01:00 (CET)
  - Summer (DST): UTC+02:00 (CEST)
- Postal codes: 25785
- Dialling codes: 04806
- Vehicle registration: HEI

Sarzbüttel (German pronunciation: [ˈzaʁtsbʏtl̩]) is a municipality in the Dithmarschen district of Schleswig-Holstein, Germany.

== Geography ==
=== Geographic location ===
The municipality of Sarzbüttel is located east of the Meldorfer Moor in the natural region of Heide-Itzehoe Geest (main unit no. 693), a subdivision of the Schleswig-Holstein Geest. The Südermiele stream partly forms its southern boundary. The only settlement within Sarzbüttel is the village from which it takes its name.

=== Neighboring municipalities ===
Sarzbüttel is surrounded by the municipalities of:

- Nordhastedt
- Odderade
- Meldorf
- Bargenstedt
- Tensbüttel-Röst

=== Landscape ===
The area around Sarzbüttel contains moors, with some larger forests to the east. There are several small lakes, though no major streams flow through the area. The Dellbrüdan stream flows near the southern border with Bargenstedt. There are no mountains nearby, with the highest local hill rising to 24 meters.

== History ==
Historically, Sarzbüttel is one of the Büttel villages. The area once included a village called Oldendorp. In the early 17th century, a noble estate near Oldendorp was fortified with a defensive wall. Over time, the village expanded and merged with other farming and settlement areas.

On April 1, 1934, the Kirchspielslandgemeinde (parish district) Südermeldorf-Geest was dissolved, granting Sarzbüttel independence as a rural municipality. During World War II, Sarzbüttel suffered minimal damage. Bombs aimed at a refinery nearby fell into surrounding moors. In recent decades, Sarzbüttel has seen significant development, particularly in its eastern areas.

Around 1985, Sarzbüttel's elementary school closed due to low enrollment, and students now attend school in Bargenstedt.

== Politics ==
=== Municipal Council ===
In the municipal elections on May 14, 2023, nine seats were awarded, all won by the Sarzbüttel General Voters' Association. Voter turnout was 58.7%.

=== Coat of Arms ===
Blazon: “In gold above a blue-silver wavy base, a flat green hill with two silver, gold-beaked mute swans facing each other. At the top are three green leaves.”

== Economy and infrastructure ==
Sarzbüttel has few businesses, the largest being a bus company and a local dairy. There are also smaller branches of companies based in nearby towns. Many residents commute to work in the surrounding central locations.

Agriculture is less prominent today, with many small farms merging due to agricultural restructuring. Proximity to the North Sea has allowed tourism to offset some economic losses.

The municipality is also known for its production of various cheeses. A cheesemaking company, Meiereigenossenschaft Sarzbüttel eG, was founded here in 1888 and remains a local specialty producer.

The Schleswig-Holstein state road 236 runs through Sarzbüttel between Dellbrück and Nordhastedt. The A23 motorway passes just east of the village. Sarzbüttel is connected by Dithmarschenbus line 4, running from Nordhastedt to Meldorf. The nearest train stations are in Nordhastedt, Albersdorf, Meldorf, and Heide.

== Culture and landmarks ==
Sarzbüttel transformed an old agricultural estate into a village community center years ago. It also has a small war memorial park listing those lost from Sarzbüttel in both world wars. A dairy in the village produces the famous Sarzbüttler Schlemmerkäse, which won the Northern German Cheese Prize in 2005. Sarzbüttel has a small church and a DeLaval operation on the northern road toward Nordhastedt.

== Sports ==
Sarzbüttel has a large football field and an archery range. The sports facilities were renovated in 2003/2004 and are managed by SSV Sarzbüttel, offering activities like football, archery, gymnastics, children's gymnastics, and step aerobics. The village also has a fishing club.
