= Wolmersdorf =

- Municipality
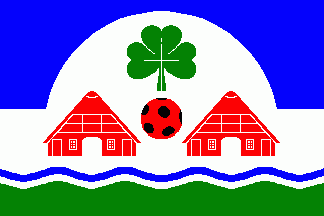
- Flag Coat of arms

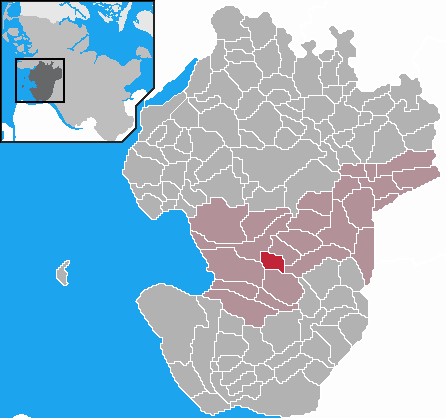
- Location of Wolmersdorf within Dithmarschen district
- Interactive map of Wolmersdorf
- Location within Germany Location within Schleswig-Holstein
- Coordinates: 54°4′41″N 9°6′20″E
- Country: Germany
- State: Schleswig-Holstein
- District: Dithmarschen
- Municipal assoc.: Mitteldithmarschen

Government
  - Mayor: Klaus Thießen

Area
  - Total: 6.11 km^{2} (2.36 sq mi)
- Elevation: 13 m (43 ft)

Population (2025-12-31)
  - Total: 323
  - Density: 52.9/km^{2} (137/sq mi)
- Time zone: UTC+01:00 (CET)
  - Summer (DST): UTC+02:00 (CEST)
- Postal codes: 25704
- Dialling codes: 04832
- Vehicle registration: HEI / MED
- Website: www.gemeinde-wolmersdorf.de

Wolmersdorf (German pronunciation: [ˈvɔlmɐsdɔʁf]) is a municipality in the district of Dithmarschen, in Schleswig-Holstein, Germany.
