= Windbergen =

- Municipality
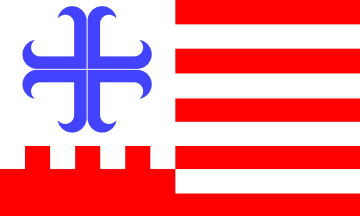
- Flag Coat of arms

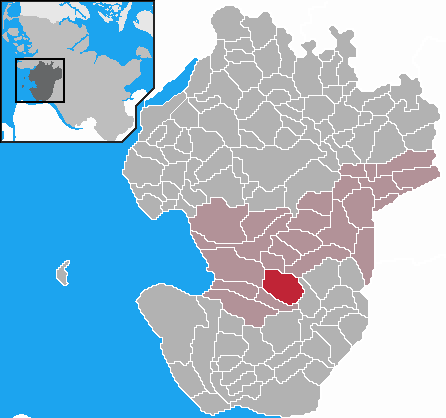
- Location of Windbergen within Dithmarschen district
- Interactive map of Windbergen
- Location within Germany Location within Schleswig-Holstein
- Coordinates: 54°3′N 9°7′E
- Country: Germany
- State: Schleswig-Holstein
- District: Dithmarschen
- Municipal assoc.: Mitteldithmarschen
- Subdivisions: 4

Government
  - Mayor: Klaus-Peter-Groth

Area
  - Total: 17.31 km^{2} (6.68 sq mi)
- Elevation: 12 m (39 ft)

Population (2025-12-31)
  - Total: 766
  - Density: 44.3/km^{2} (115/sq mi)
- Time zone: UTC+01:00 (CET)
  - Summer (DST): UTC+02:00 (CEST)
- Postal codes: 25729
- Dialling codes: 04859
- Vehicle registration: HEI
- Website: www.gemeinde-windbergen.de

Windbergen (German pronunciation: [vɪntˈbɛʁɡn̩]) is a municipality in the district of Dithmarschen, in Schleswig-Holstein, Germany.
