= Kuden =

- Municipality
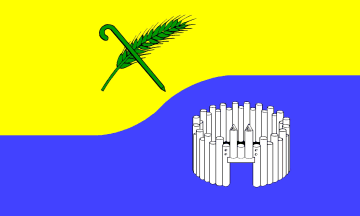
- Flag Coat of arms

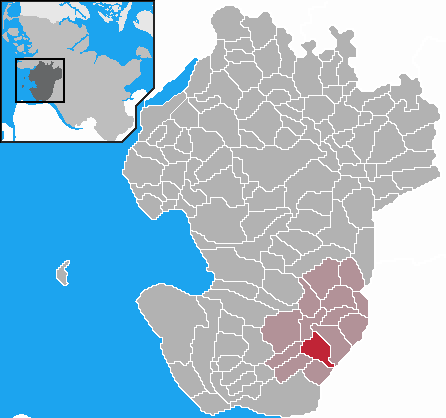
- Location of Kuden within Dithmarschen district
- Interactive map of Kuden
- Location within Germany Location within Schleswig-Holstein
- Coordinates: 53°58′N 9°11′E
- Country: Germany
- State: Schleswig-Holstein
- District: Dithmarschen
- Municipal assoc.: Burg-Sankt Michaelisdonn

Government
  - Mayor: Dieter Gäthje

Area
  - Total: 11.37 km^{2} (4.39 sq mi)
- Elevation: 7 m (23 ft)

Population (2025-12-31)
  - Total: 658
  - Density: 57.9/km^{2} (150/sq mi)
- Time zone: UTC+01:00 (CET)
  - Summer (DST): UTC+02:00 (CEST)
- Postal codes: 25712
- Dialling codes: 04855
- Vehicle registration: HEI

Kuden (German pronunciation: [ˈkuːdn̩]) is a municipality in the district of Dithmarschen, in Schleswig-Holstein, Germany.
