= Dingen, Netherlands =

Dingen
- Hamlet
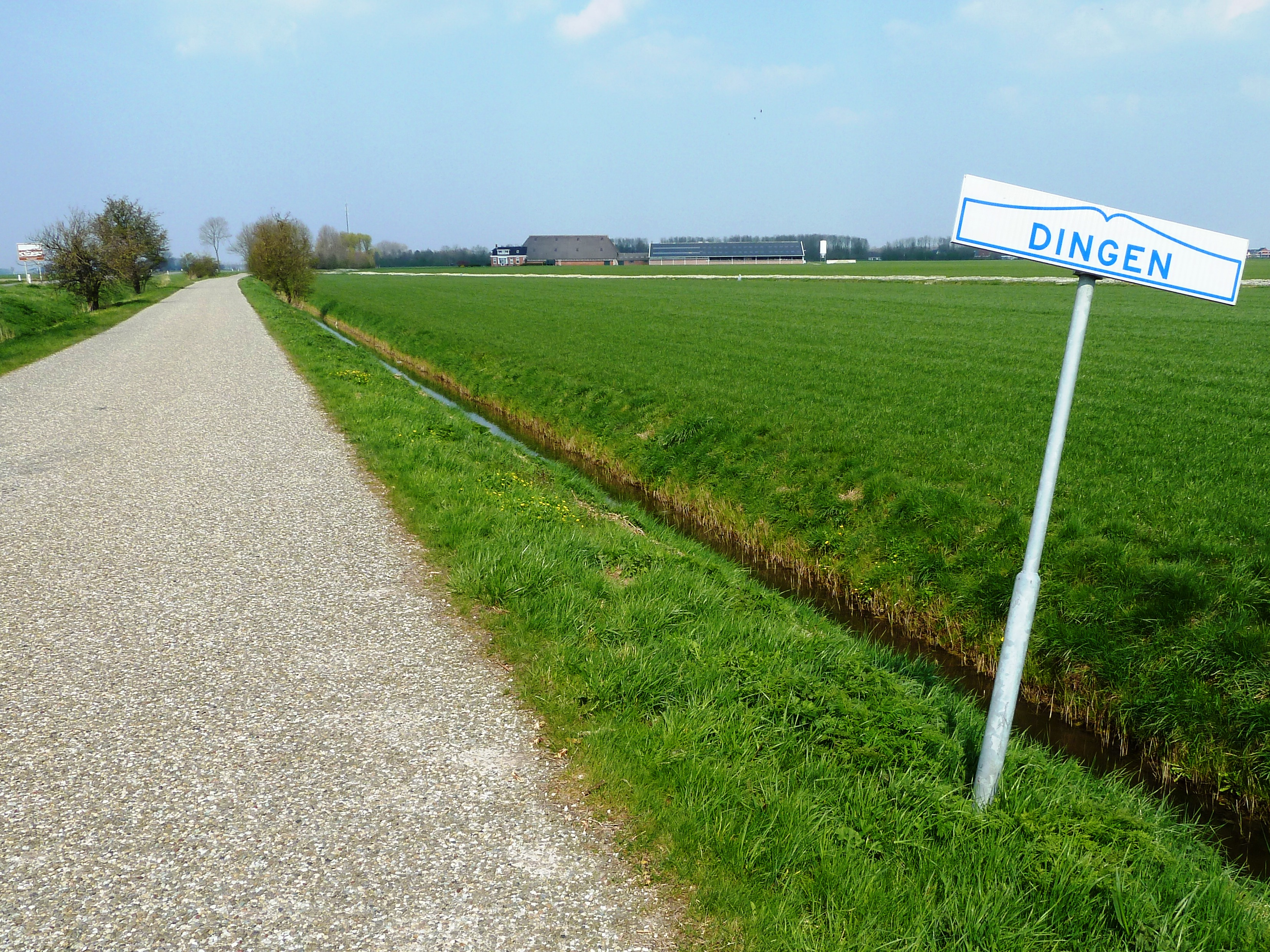

- Location of Dingen in the province of Groningen
- Coordinates: 53°21′15″N 6°30′34″E
- Country: Netherlands
- Province: Groningen
- Municipality: Het Hogeland

De Dingen is a former hamlet in the Dutch province of Groningen. It was located about 1 km south of Baflo.

According to the 19th-century historian A.J. van der Aa, the hamlet consisted of four farms, stretching from east to west. There used to be a fortified house here, called "Dingen" or "De Dingen".

The farms still exist, and are still called Dingen; but they are no longer considered to be a separate settlement on the newest topographical map of the area.
