= Osterrade =

- Municipality
- Coat of arms

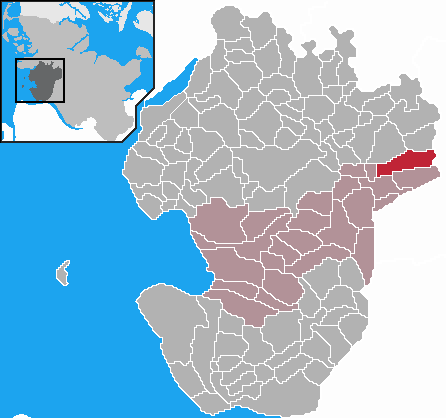
- Location of Osterrade within Dithmarschen district
- Interactive map of Osterrade
- Location within Germany Location within Schleswig-Holstein
- Coordinates: 54°12′N 9°20′E
- Country: Germany
- State: Schleswig-Holstein
- District: Dithmarschen
- Municipal assoc.: Mitteldithmarschen
- Subdivisions: 7

Government
  - Mayor: Wolfgang Knicanin

Area
  - Total: 17.09 km^{2} (6.60 sq mi)
- Elevation: 21 m (69 ft)

Population (2025-12-31)
  - Total: 406
  - Density: 23.8/km^{2} (61.5/sq mi)
- Time zone: UTC+01:00 (CET)
  - Summer (DST): UTC+02:00 (CEST)
- Postal codes: 25767
- Dialling codes: 04802, 04835
- Vehicle registration: HEI
- Website: www.osterrade.de

Osterrade is a municipality in the district of Dithmarschen, in Schleswig-Holstein, Germany.
