= Busenwurth =

- Municipality
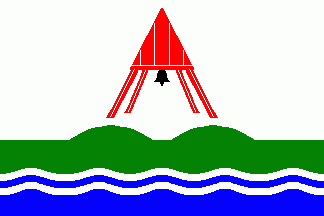
- Flag Coat of arms

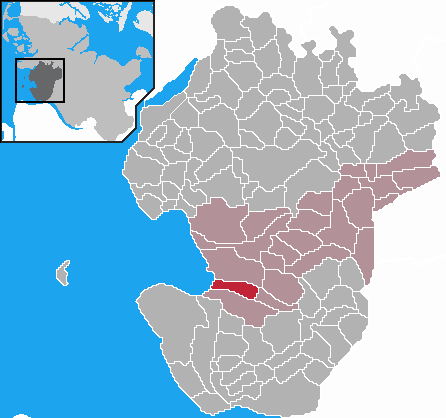
- Location of Busenwurth within Dithmarschen district
- Interactive map of Busenwurth
- Location within Germany Location within Schleswig-Holstein
- Coordinates: 54°2′N 9°2′E
- Country: Germany
- State: Schleswig-Holstein
- District: Dithmarschen
- Municipal assoc.: Mitteldithmarschen
- Subdivisions: 3

Government
  - Mayor: Sabine Möhring

Area
  - Total: 10.09 km^{2} (3.90 sq mi)
- Elevation: 3 m (9.8 ft)

Population (2025-12-31)
  - Total: 324
  - Density: 32.1/km^{2} (83.2/sq mi)
- Time zone: UTC+01:00 (CET)
  - Summer (DST): UTC+02:00 (CEST)
- Postal codes: 25719
- Dialling codes: 04857, 04859
- Vehicle registration: HEI

Busenwurth (German pronunciation: [ˈbuːzn̩vʊʁt]) is a municipality in the district of Dithmarschen, in Schleswig-Holstein, Germany.
