= Großenrade =

- Municipality
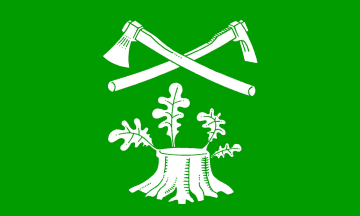
- Flag Coat of arms

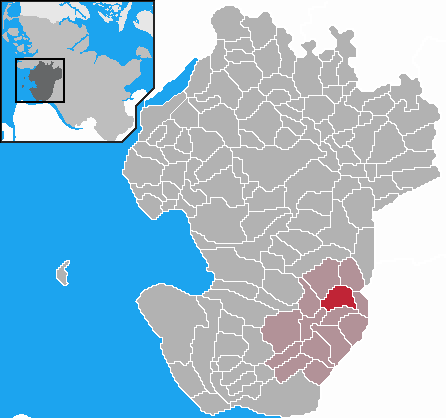
- Location of Großenrade within Dithmarschen district
- Interactive map of Großenrade
- Location within Germany Location within Schleswig-Holstein
- Coordinates: 54°2′N 9°4′E
- Country: Germany
- State: Schleswig-Holstein
- District: Dithmarschen
- Municipal assoc.: Burg-Sankt Michaelisdonn

Government
  - Mayor: Hans-Peter Reimers

Area
  - Total: 10.4 km^{2} (4.0 sq mi)
- Elevation: 8 m (26 ft)

Population (2025-12-31)
  - Total: 462
  - Density: 44.4/km^{2} (115/sq mi)
- Time zone: UTC+01:00 (CET)
  - Summer (DST): UTC+02:00 (CEST)
- Postal codes: 25712
- Dialling codes: 04825
- Vehicle registration: HEI

Großenrade is a municipality in the district of Dithmarschen, in Schleswig-Holstein, Germany.
