= Immenstedt, Dithmarschen =

Immenstedt
- Municipality
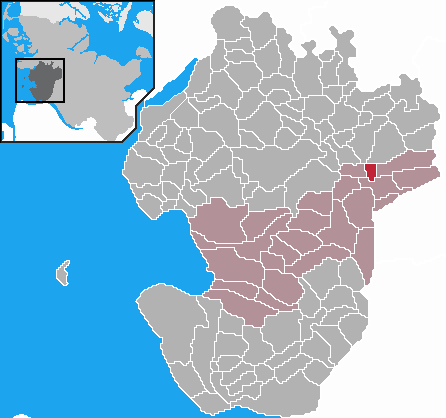
- Location of Immenstedt within Dithmarschen district
- Interactive map of Immenstedt
- Location within Germany Location within Schleswig-Holstein
- Coordinates: 54°10′30″N 9°18′0″E
- Country: Germany
- State: Schleswig-Holstein
- District: Dithmarschen
- Municipal assoc.: Mitteldithmarschen

Government
  - Mayor: Klaus Hermann Bock

Area
  - Total: 3.09 km^{2} (1.19 sq mi)
- Elevation: 43 m (141 ft)

Population (2025-12-31)
  - Total: 114
  - Density: 36.9/km^{2} (95.6/sq mi)
- Time zone: UTC+01:00 (CET)
  - Summer (DST): UTC+02:00 (CEST)
- Postal codes: 25767
- Dialling codes: 04835
- Vehicle registration: HEI
- Website: www.gemeinde-immenstedt.de

Immenstedt (German pronunciation: [ˈɪmənʃtɛt]) is a municipality in the district of Dithmarschen, in Schleswig-Holstein, Germany. Until 2008 it was part of the Amt Kirchspielslandgemeinde Albersdorf.
