= Elpersbüttel =

- Municipality
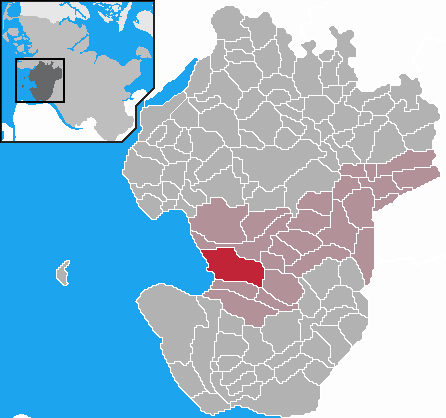
- Location of Elpersbüttel within Dithmarschen district
- Interactive map of Elpersbüttel
- Location within Germany Location within Schleswig-Holstein
- Coordinates: 54°4′25″N 9°2′51″E
- Country: Germany
- State: Schleswig-Holstein
- District: Dithmarschen
- Municipal assoc.: Mitteldithmarschen
- Subdivisions: 6

Government
  - Mayor: Sven Karstens (AWV)

Area
  - Total: 30.17 km^{2} (11.65 sq mi)
- Elevation: 2 m (6.6 ft)

Population (2025-12-31)
  - Total: 879
  - Density: 29.1/km^{2} (75.5/sq mi)
- Time zone: UTC+01:00 (CET)
  - Summer (DST): UTC+02:00 (CEST)
- Postal codes: 25704
- Dialling codes: 04832, 04859
- Vehicle registration: HEI

Elpersbüttel is a municipality in the district of Dithmarschen, in Schleswig-Holstein, Germany.

== Climate ==
Climate data for Elpersbüttel (1991–2020 normals)
Month	Jan	Feb	Mar	Apr	May	Jun	Jul	Aug	Sep	Oct	Nov	Dec	Year
Mean daily maximum °C (°F)	3.9 (39.0)	4.3 (39.7)	7.9 (46.2)	13.2 (55.8)	16.8 (62.2)	19.6 (67.3)	22.1 (71.8)	22.0 (71.6)	18.5 (65.3)	13.4 (56.1)	8.5 (47.3)	5.2 (41.4)	13.1 (55.6)
Daily mean °C (°F)	2.0 (35.6)	2.1 (35.8)	4.5 (40.1)	8.6 (47.5)	12.4 (54.3)	15.6 (60.1)	17.7 (63.9)	17.6 (63.7)	14.4 (57.9)	10.5 (50.9)	6.2 (43.2)	3.3 (37.9)	9.6 (49.3)
Mean daily minimum °C (°F)	−0.6 (30.9)	−0.6 (30.9)	1.0 (33.8)	4.0 (39.2)	7.6 (45.7)	10.8 (51.4)	13.0 (55.4)	13.0 (55.4)	10.5 (50.9)	6.9 (44.4)	3.6 (38.5)	0.9 (33.6)	5.9 (42.6)
Average relative humidity (%)	91.0	88.6	85.2	78.7	77.5	78.8	79.2	80.5	83.9	88.4	91.7	92.0	83.6
Mean monthly sunshine hours	44.7	75.7	140.7	212.1	241.0	226.8	234.1	208.1	153.5	104.5	54.6	40.1	1,739.4
Source: NOAA
