= Buchholz, Dithmarschen =

Buchholz
- Municipality
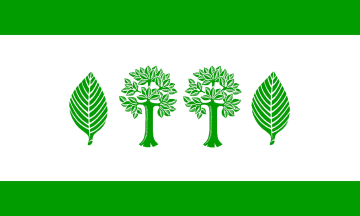
- Flag Coat of arms

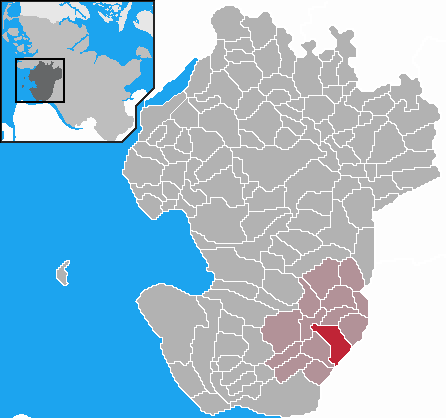
- Location of Buchholz within Dithmarschen district
- Interactive map of Buchholz
- Location within Germany Location within Schleswig-Holstein
- Coordinates: 53°59′17″N 09°13′29″E
- Country: Germany
- State: Schleswig-Holstein
- District: Dithmarschen
- Municipal assoc.: Burg-Sankt Michaelisdonn

Area
  - Total: 14.56 km^{2} (5.62 sq mi)
- Elevation: 34 m (112 ft)

Population (2025-12-31)
  - Total: 998
  - Density: 68.5/km^{2} (178/sq mi)
- Time zone: UTC+01:00 (CET)
  - Summer (DST): UTC+02:00 (CEST)
- Postal codes: 25712
- Dialling codes: 04825
- Vehicle registration: HEI

Buchholz (German pronunciation: [ˈbuːxhɔlts]) is a municipality in the district of Dithmarschen, in Schleswig-Holstein, Germany.
