= Averlak =

- Municipality
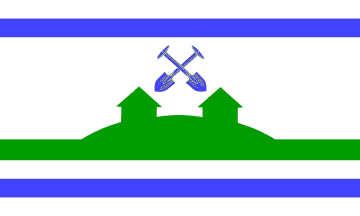
- Flag Coat of arms

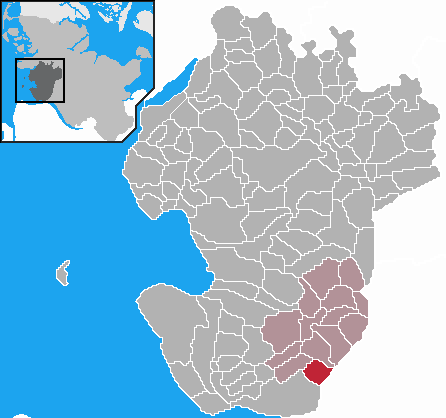
- Location of Averlak within Dithmarschen district
- Interactive map of Averlak
- Location within Germany Location within Schleswig-Holstein
- Coordinates: 53°57′N 09°11′E
- Country: Germany
- State: Schleswig-Holstein
- District: Dithmarschen
- Municipal assoc.: Burg-Sankt Michaelisdonn

Government
  - Mayor: Dieter Kröger

Area
  - Total: 9.06 km^{2} (3.50 sq mi)
- Elevation: 6 m (20 ft)

Population (2025-12-31)
  - Total: 595
  - Density: 65.7/km^{2} (170/sq mi)
- Time zone: UTC+01:00 (CET)
  - Summer (DST): UTC+02:00 (CEST)
- Postal codes: 25715
- Dialling codes: 04855
- Vehicle registration: HEI

Averlak is a municipality in the district of Dithmarschen, in Schleswig-Holstein, Germany. It is located on the Kiel Canal.
