= Hutberg (Oderwitz) =

Mountain in Saxony, Germany

Coordinates: 50°56′58″N 14°45′13″E

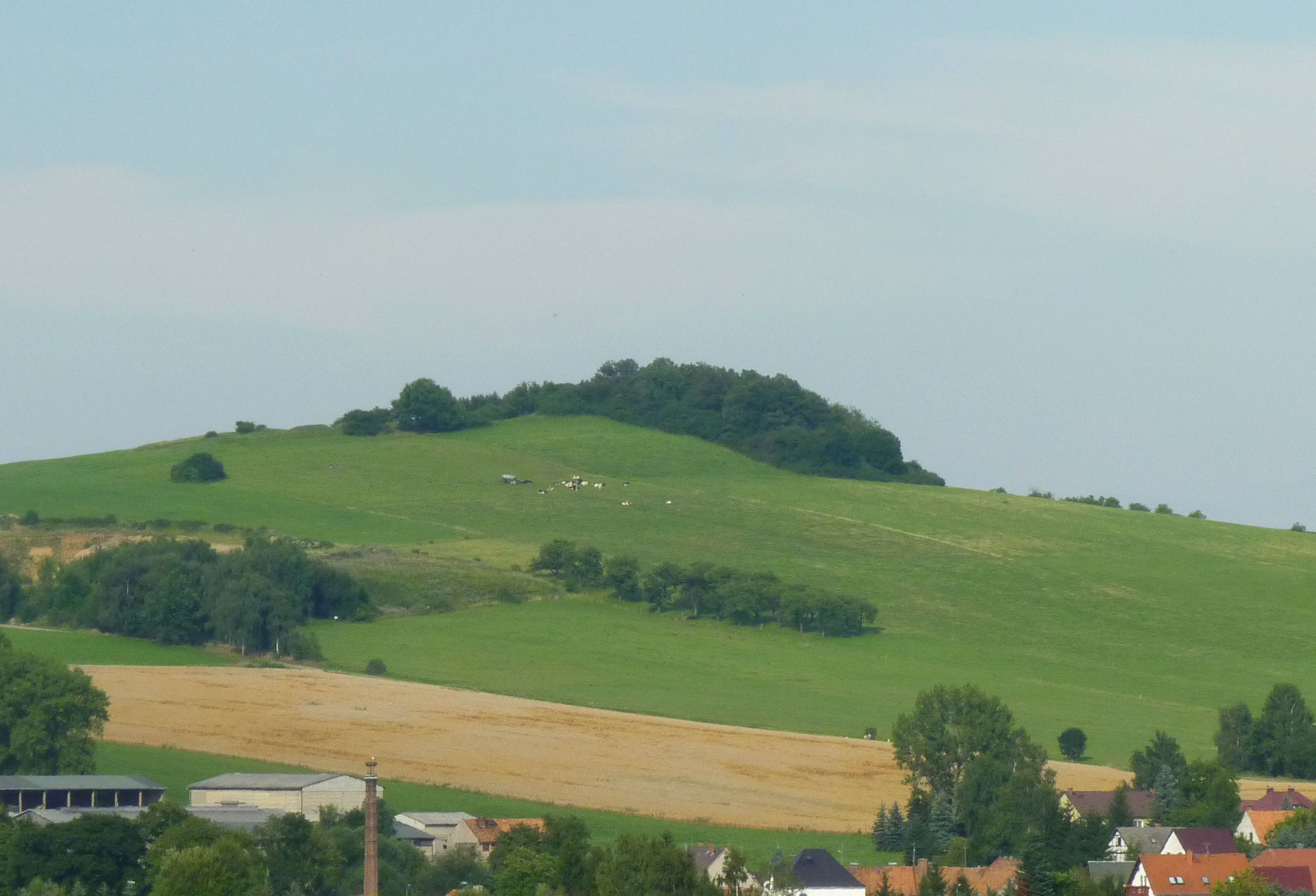
- Hutberg near Oderwitz

Highest point
- Elevation: 405 m (1,329 ft)

Geography
- Location: Saxony, Germany

Hutberg is a mountain of Saxony, southeastern Germany near Oderwitz.
