= Nindorf =

- Municipality
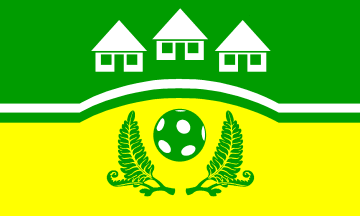
- Flag Coat of arms

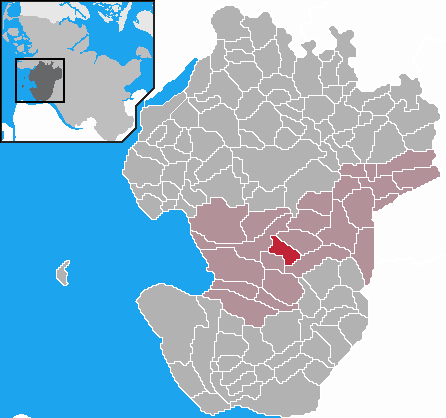
- Location of Nindorf within Dithmarschen district
- Interactive map of Nindorf
- Location within Germany Location within Schleswig-Holstein
- Coordinates: 54°4′N 9°7′E
- Country: Germany
- State: Schleswig-Holstein
- District: Dithmarschen
- Municipal assoc.: Mitteldithmarschen

Government
  - Mayor: Klaus Busch-Claußen

Area
  - Total: 8.72 km^{2} (3.37 sq mi)
- Elevation: 12 m (39 ft)

Population (2025-12-31)
  - Total: 1,155
  - Density: 132/km^{2} (343/sq mi)
- Time zone: UTC+01:00 (CET)
  - Summer (DST): UTC+02:00 (CEST)
- Postal codes: 25704
- Dialling codes: 04832
- Vehicle registration: HEI
- Website: www.amt-meldorf- land.de

Nindorf is a municipality in the district of Dithmarschen, in Schleswig-Holstein, Germany.
