= Offenbüttel =

- Municipality
- Coat of arms

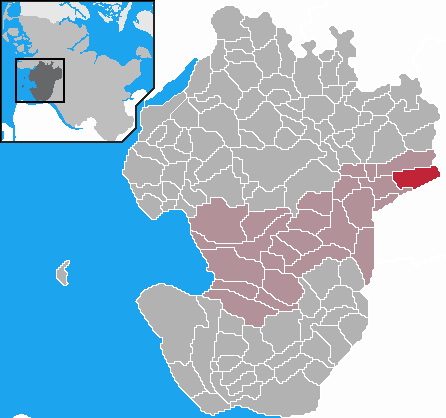
- Location of Offenbüttel within Dithmarschen district
- Interactive map of Offenbüttel
- Location within Germany Location within Schleswig-Holstein
- Coordinates: 54°10′N 9°21′E
- Country: Germany
- State: Schleswig-Holstein
- District: Dithmarschen
- Municipal assoc.: Mitteldithmarschen
- Subdivisions: 6

Government
  - Mayor: Tim Blohm

Area
  - Total: 13.95 km^{2} (5.39 sq mi)
- Elevation: 4 m (13 ft)

Population (2025-12-31)
  - Total: 263
  - Density: 18.9/km^{2} (48.8/sq mi)
- Time zone: UTC+01:00 (CET)
  - Summer (DST): UTC+02:00 (CEST)
- Postal codes: 25767
- Dialling codes: 04802, 04835
- Vehicle registration: HEI
- Website: www.offenbuettel.de

Offenbüttel (German pronunciation: [ˈɔfn̩bʏtl̩]) is a municipality in the district of Dithmarschen, in Schleswig-Holstein, Germany.
