= Brickeln =

- Municipality
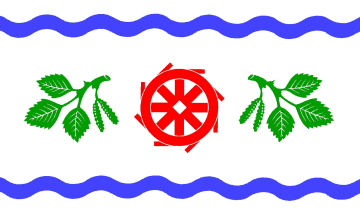
- Flag Coat of arms

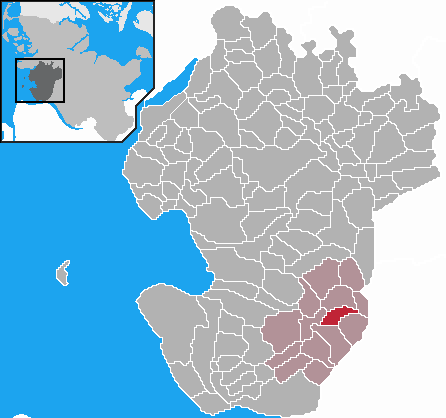
- Location of Brickeln within Dithmarschen district
- Interactive map of Brickeln
- Location within Germany Location within Schleswig-Holstein
- Coordinates: 54°1′N 9°14′E
- Country: Germany
- State: Schleswig-Holstein
- District: Dithmarschen
- Municipal assoc.: Burg-Sankt Michaelisdonn

Government
  - Mayor: Ralf Jebens

Area
  - Total: 6.07 km^{2} (2.34 sq mi)
- Elevation: 14 m (46 ft)

Population (2025-12-31)
  - Total: 185
  - Density: 30.5/km^{2} (78.9/sq mi)
- Time zone: UTC+01:00 (CET)
  - Summer (DST): UTC+02:00 (CEST)
- Postal codes: 25712
- Dialling codes: 04825
- Vehicle registration: HEI

Brickeln (German pronunciation: [ˈbʁɪkl̩n]) is a municipality in the district of Dithmarschen, in Schleswig-Holstein, Germany.
