= Hutberg (Dürrhennersdorf) =

Mountain in Germany

Coordinates: 51°02′46″N 14°36′50″E

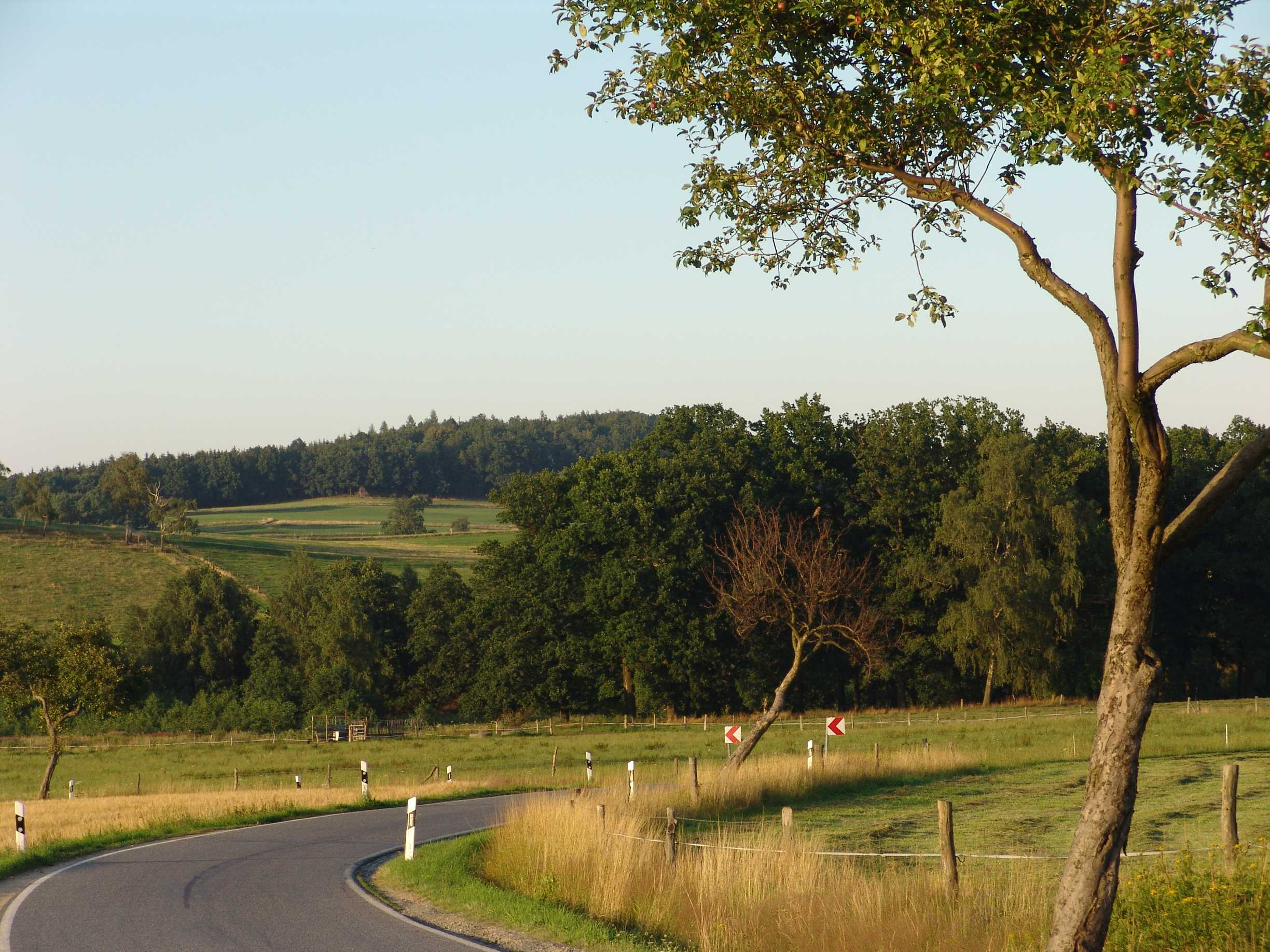
- Hutberg

Highest point
- Elevation: 422.5 m (1,386 ft)

Geography
- Location: Saxony, Germany

Hutberg is a mountain of Saxony, southeastern Germany. The Hutberg is located immediately east of the Dürrhennersdorf train station and south of the K 8677 (Bahnhofsstraße) and rises about 80 meters from the valley of the Großschweidnitzer Wasser. To the east, on the edge of the forest, there are two larger ponds (Engeleiteiche) that drain northwards into the Großschweidnitzer Wasser in the Hutbergwasser.

== Geography ==
Its summit as well as the northern and eastern slopes are covered with forest areas, the western and southern slopes are occupied by agricultural grassland.

Blocks of granodiorite are scattered around with different densities. In some areas, they are completely absent. A cliff ridge about 4 m high and about 10 m long crowns the summit, which is also known as the Hutstein. To the south and southeast of it lie numerous blocks of rock, the edges of which, in contrast to the other blocks, look remarkably freshly weathered and angular. Granodiorite is found in the abandoned quarry west of the summit.

The surrounding forest is a mix of spruce, pine and larch, interspersed with individual red oaks.
