= Eggstedt =

- Municipality
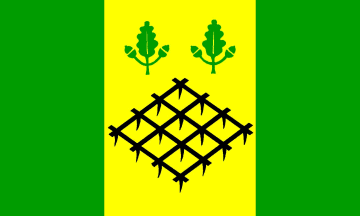
- Flag Coat of arms

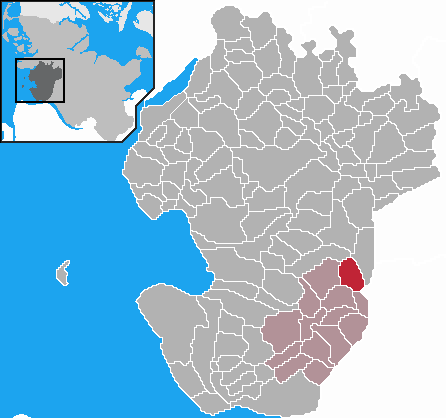
- Location of Eggstedt within Dithmarschen district
- Interactive map of Eggstedt
- Location within Germany Location within Schleswig-Holstein
- Coordinates: 54°3′N 9°16′E
- Country: Germany
- State: Schleswig-Holstein
- District: Dithmarschen
- Municipal assoc.: Burg-Sankt Michaelisdonn
- Subdivisions: 5

Government
  - Mayor: Walter Krotzek

Area
  - Total: 12.79 km^{2} (4.94 sq mi)
- Elevation: 8 m (26 ft)

Population (2025-12-31)
  - Total: 749
  - Density: 58.6/km^{2} (152/sq mi)
- Time zone: UTC+01:00 (CET)
  - Summer (DST): UTC+02:00 (CEST)
- Postal codes: 25721
- Dialling codes: 04830
- Vehicle registration: HEI

Eggstedt (German pronunciation: [ˈɛkʃtɛt]) is a municipality in the district of Dithmarschen, in Schleswig-Holstein, Germany. Eggstedt is a part of the Kaiser-Tour in 2010.
