= Quickborn, Dithmarschen =

Quickborn
- Municipality
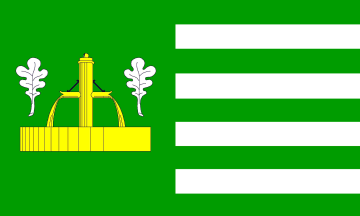
- Flag Coat of arms

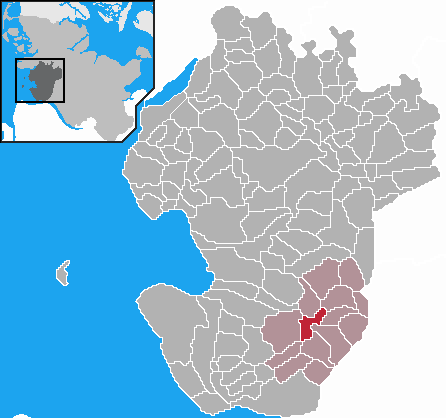
- Location of Quickborn within Dithmarschen district
- Interactive map of Quickborn
- Location within Germany Location within Schleswig-Holstein
- Coordinates: 54°1′N 9°12′E
- Country: Germany
- State: Schleswig-Holstein
- District: Dithmarschen
- Municipal assoc.: Burg-Sankt Michaelisdonn

Government
  - Mayor: Peter Kaiser

Area
  - Total: 6.95 km^{2} (2.68 sq mi)
- Elevation: 10 m (33 ft)

Population (2025-12-31)
  - Total: 186
  - Density: 26.8/km^{2} (69.3/sq mi)
- Time zone: UTC+01:00 (CET)
  - Summer (DST): UTC+02:00 (CEST)
- Postal codes: 25712
- Dialling codes: 04825
- Vehicle registration: HEI

Quickborn (German pronunciation: [ˈkvɪkbɔʁn]) is a municipality in the district of Dithmarschen, in Schleswig-Holstein, Germany.
