= Burg, Dithmarschen =

- Municipality
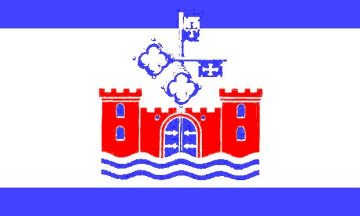
- Flag Coat of arms

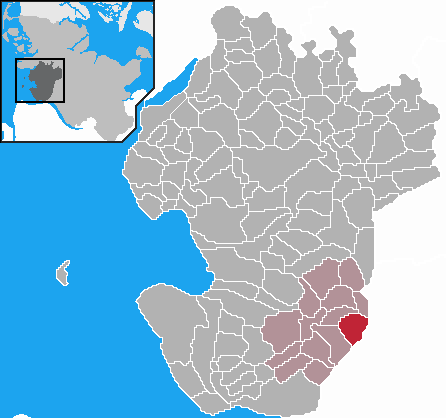
- Location of Burg, Dithmarschen within Dithmarschen district
- Interactive map of Burg, Dithmarschen
- Location within Germany Location within Schleswig-Holstein
- Coordinates: 54°0′N 9°16′E
- Country: Germany
- State: Schleswig-Holstein
- District: Dithmarschen
- Municipal assoc.: Burg-Sankt Michaelisdonn

Government
  - Mayor: Werner Hill

Area
  - Total: 11.25 km^{2} (4.34 sq mi)
- Elevation: 1–65 m (3.3–213.3 ft)

Population (2025-12-31)
  - Total: 4,079
  - Density: 362.6/km^{2} (939.1/sq mi)
- Time zone: UTC+01:00 (CET)
  - Summer (DST): UTC+02:00 (CEST)
- Postal codes: 25712
- Dialling codes: 04825
- Vehicle registration: HEI
- Website: www.burg-dithmarschen.de

Burg (German pronunciation: [bʊʁk]) is a municipality in the district of Dithmarschen, in Schleswig-Holstein, Germany. It lies at the rim of the Heide-Itzehoe Geest with parts of the village in the marshland below. It was named after a fortress "Bökelnburg" of which a 9th-century earth wall ring remains. According to legend Burg was the site of a farmer's revolt. They burned down the castle and killed the count who had asked for a "tenth" tribute despite it being a time of drought.

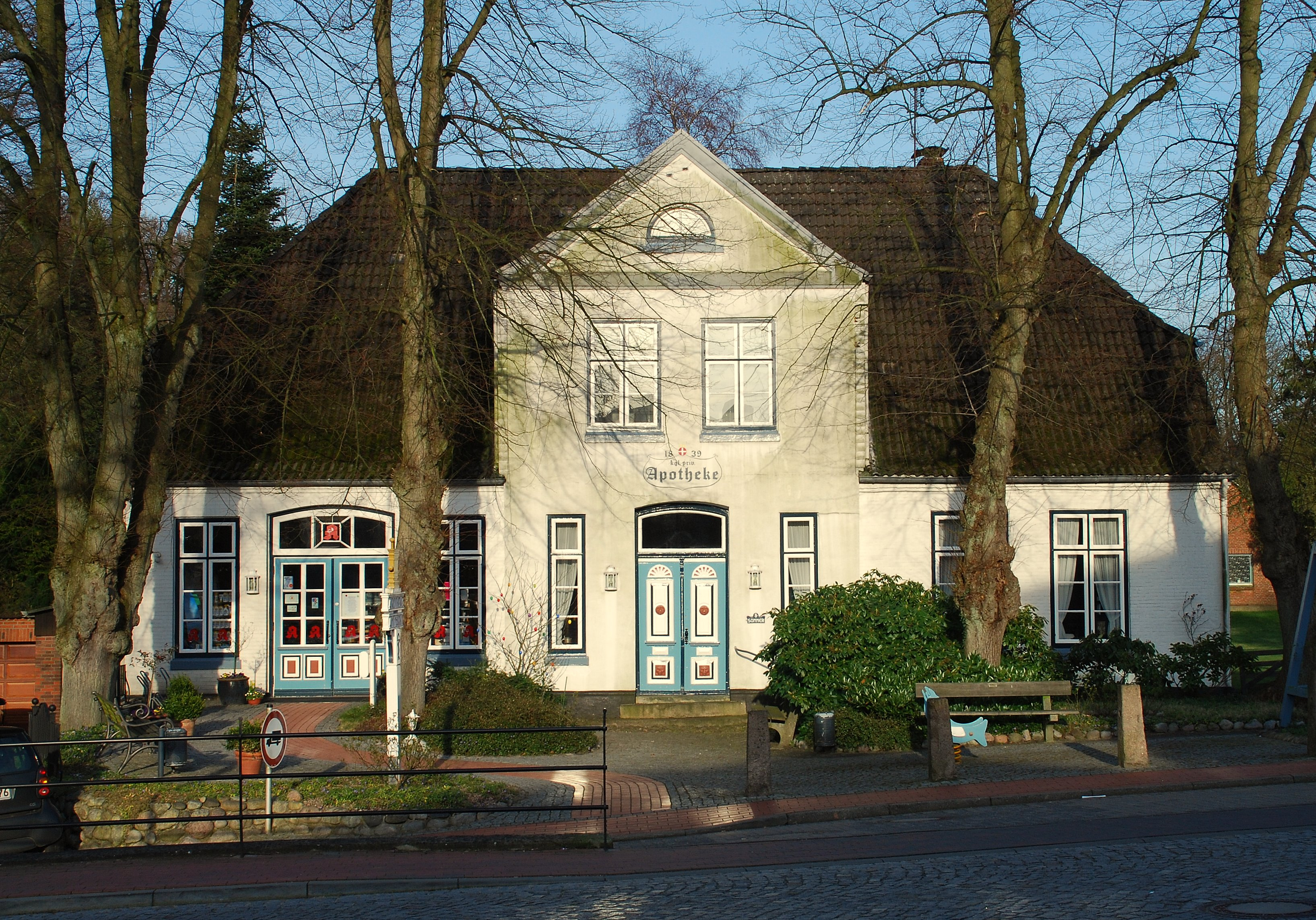
kgl. priv. Apotheke am Markt

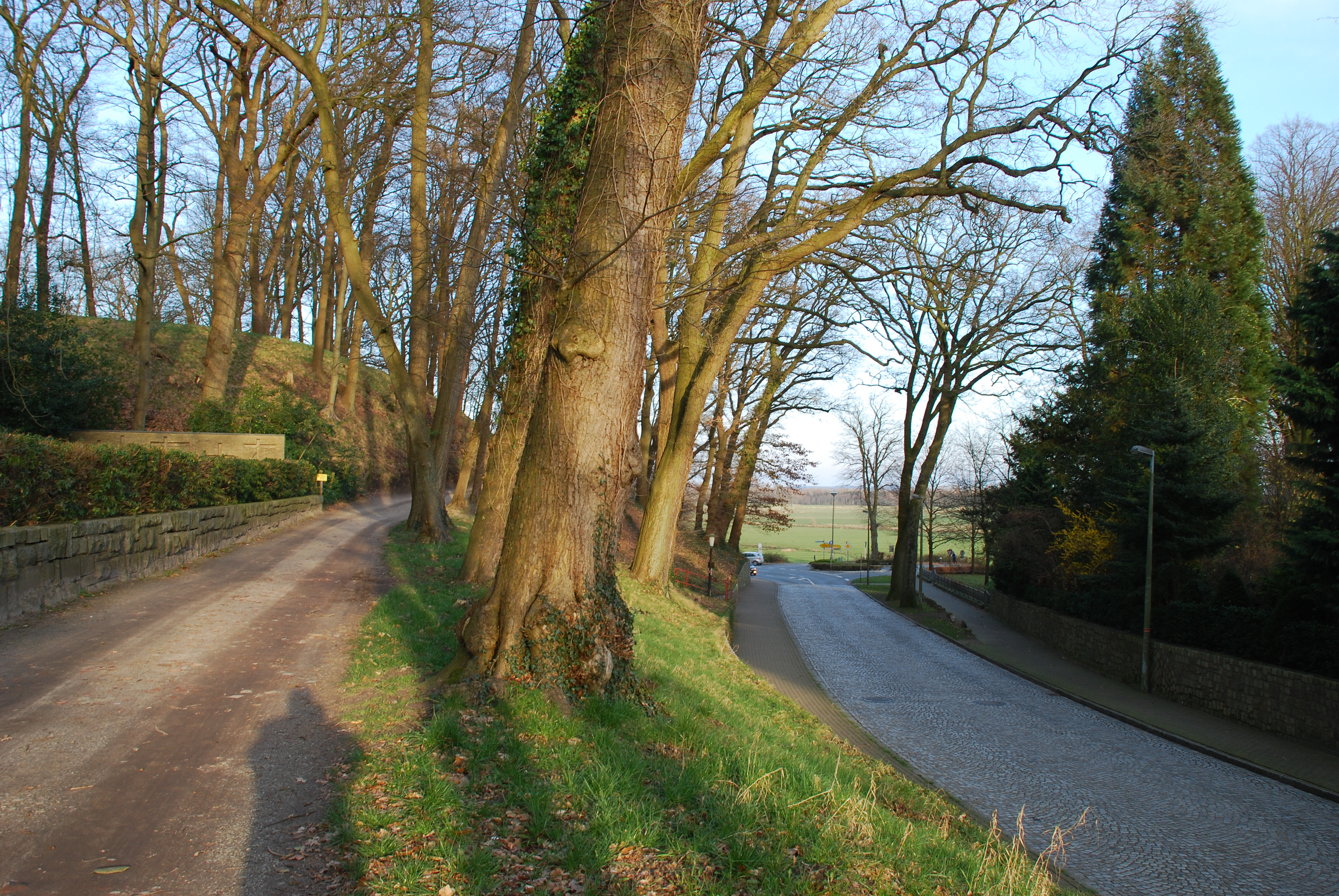
Auffahrt zur Bökelnburg

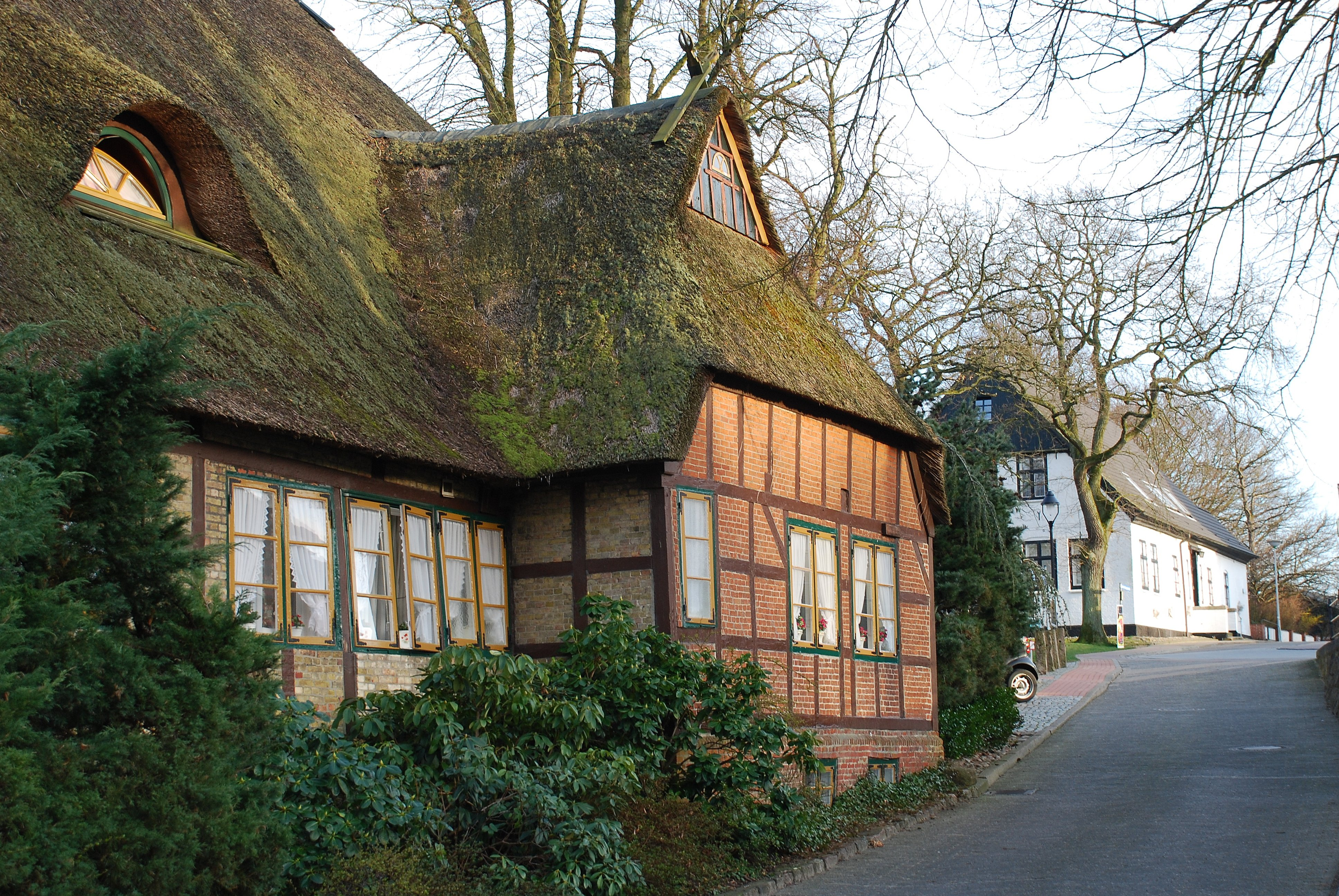
Krenzerstraße

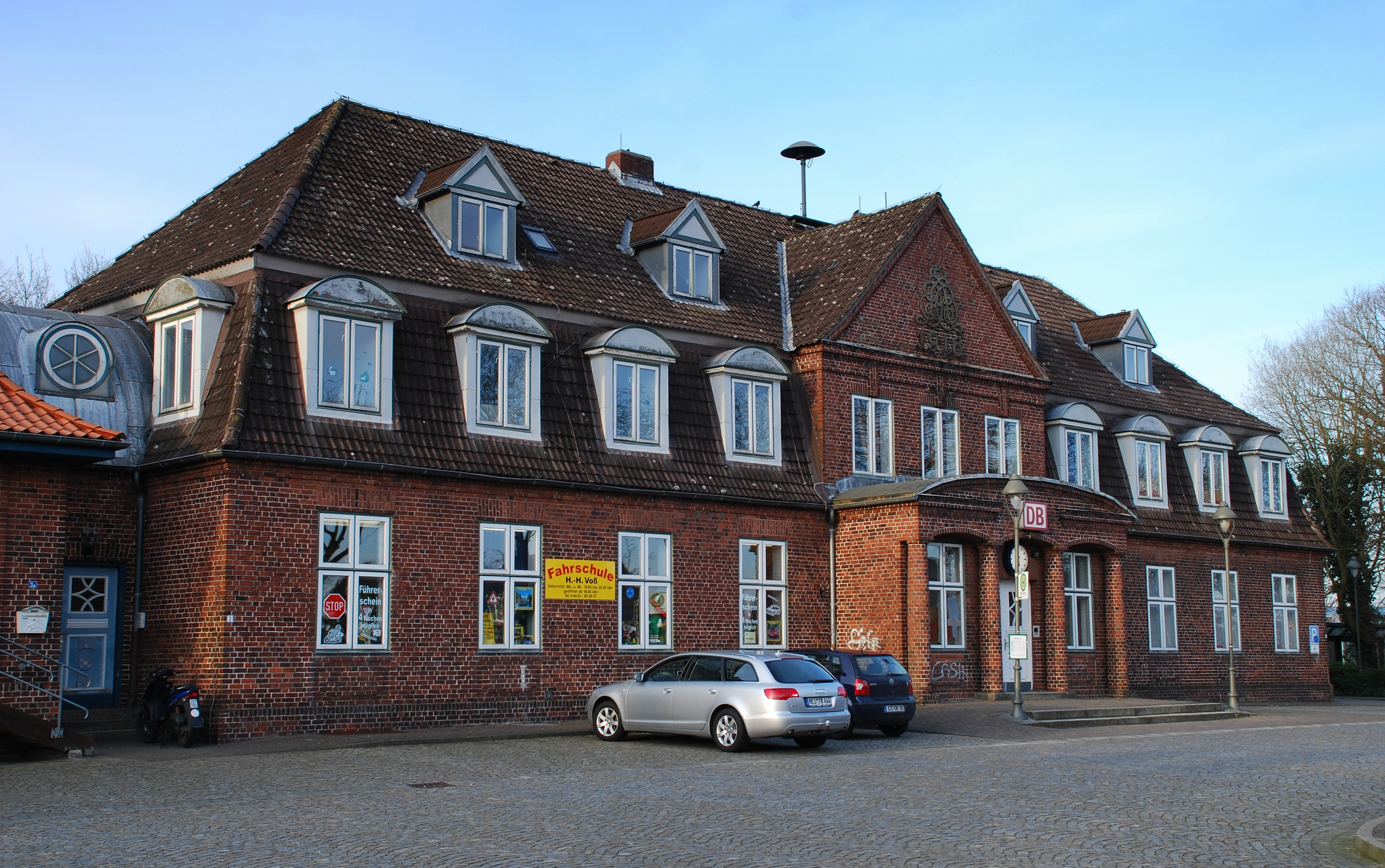
Bahnhof Burg
