= Bargenstedt =

- Municipality
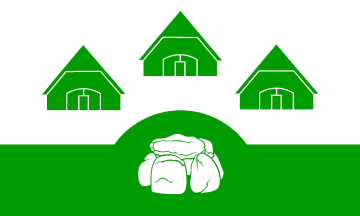
- Flag Coat of arms

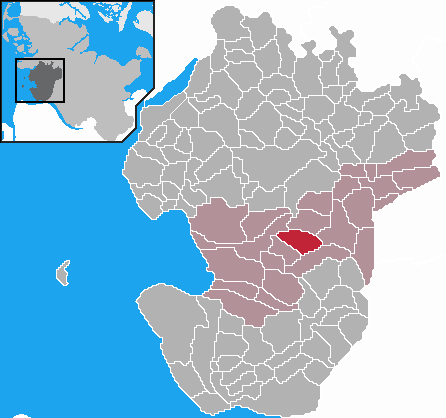
- Location of Bargenstedt within Dithmarschen district
- Interactive map of Bargenstedt
- Location within Germany Location within Schleswig-Holstein
- Coordinates: 54°06′N 09°09′E
- Country: Germany
- State: Schleswig-Holstein
- District: Dithmarschen
- Municipal assoc.: Mitteldithmarschen
- Subdivisions: 3

Government
  - Mayor: Titus Kretzschmar

Area
  - Total: 11.9 km^{2} (4.6 sq mi)
- Elevation: 12 m (39 ft)

Population (2025-12-31)
  - Total: 947
  - Density: 79.6/km^{2} (206/sq mi)
- Time zone: UTC+01:00 (CET)
  - Summer (DST): UTC+02:00 (CEST)
- Postal codes: 25704
- Dialling codes: 04832 and 04806 (Dellbrück)
- Vehicle registration: HEI
- Website: bargenstedt.de

Bargenstedt (German pronunciation: [ˈbaʁɡn̩ʃtɛt]) is a municipality in the district of Dithmarschen, in Schleswig-Holstein, Germany.
