= Frestedt =

- Municipality
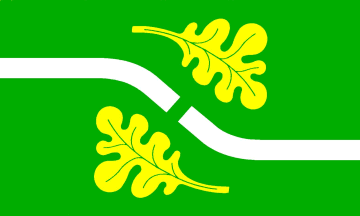
- Flag Coat of arms

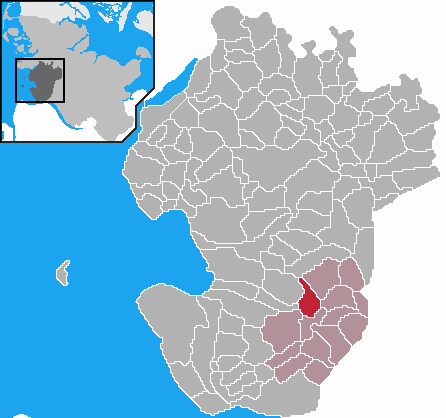
- Location of Frestedt within Dithmarschen district
- Interactive map of Frestedt
- Location within Germany Location within Schleswig-Holstein
- Coordinates: 54°1′27″N 9°10′37″E
- Country: Germany
- State: Schleswig-Holstein
- District: Dithmarschen
- Municipal assoc.: Burg-Sankt Michaelisdonn

Government
  - Mayor: Hauke Zimmermann

Area
  - Total: 10.33 km^{2} (3.99 sq mi)
- Elevation: 16 m (52 ft)

Population (2025-12-31)
  - Total: 330
  - Density: 32/km^{2} (83/sq mi)
- Time zone: UTC+01:00 (CET)
  - Summer (DST): UTC+02:00 (CEST)
- Postal codes: 25727
- Dialling codes: 04830
- Vehicle registration: HEI

Frestedt (German pronunciation: [ˈfʁeːʃtɛt]) is a municipality in the district of Dithmarschen, in Schleswig-Holstein, Germany.
