= Gudendorf =

- Municipality
- Coat of arms

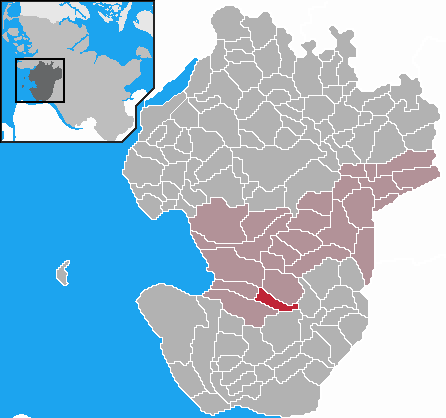
- Location of Gudendorf within Dithmarschen district
- Interactive map of Gudendorf
- Location within Germany Location within Schleswig-Holstein
- Coordinates: 54°2′N 9°6′E
- Country: Germany
- State: Schleswig-Holstein
- District: Dithmarschen
- Municipal assoc.: Mitteldithmarschen
- Subdivisions: 2

Government
  - Mayor: Jens Thomsen (CDU)

Area
  - Total: 6.04 km^{2} (2.33 sq mi)
- Elevation: 16 m (52 ft)

Population (2025-12-31)
  - Total: 421
  - Density: 69.7/km^{2} (181/sq mi)
- Time zone: UTC+01:00 (CET)
  - Summer (DST): UTC+02:00 (CEST)
- Postal codes: 25693
- Dialling codes: 04859
- Vehicle registration: HEI
- Website: www.gemeinde-gudendorf.de

Gudendorf (German pronunciation: [ˈɡuːdn̩dɔʁf]) is a municipality in the district of Dithmarschen, in Schleswig-Holstein, Germany.
