= Odderade =

- Municipality
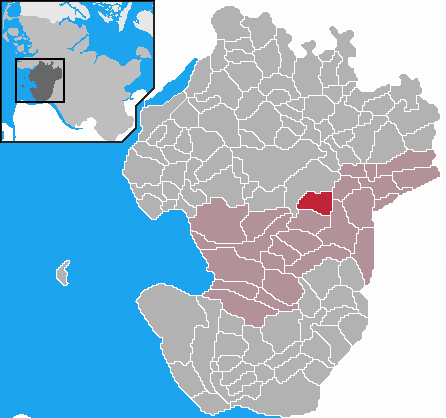
- Location of Odderade within Dithmarschen district
- Interactive map of Odderade
- Location within Germany Location within Schleswig-Holstein
- Coordinates: 54°08′27″N 9°11′29″E
- Country: Germany
- State: Schleswig-Holstein
- District: Dithmarschen
- Municipal assoc.: Mitteldithmarschen
- Subdivisions: 3

Government
  - Mayor: Hans Otto Butenschön

Area
  - Total: 11.29 km^{2} (4.36 sq mi)
- Elevation: 21 m (69 ft)

Population (2025-12-31)
  - Total: 325
  - Density: 28.8/km^{2} (74.6/sq mi)
- Time zone: UTC+01:00 (CET)
  - Summer (DST): UTC+02:00 (CEST)
- Postal codes: 25785
- Dialling codes: 04804, 04806
- Vehicle registration: HEI
- Website: www.odderade.de

Odderade is a municipality in the district of Dithmarschen, in Schleswig-Holstein, Germany.
