= Dingen, Dithmarschen =

- Municipality
- Flag Coat of arms

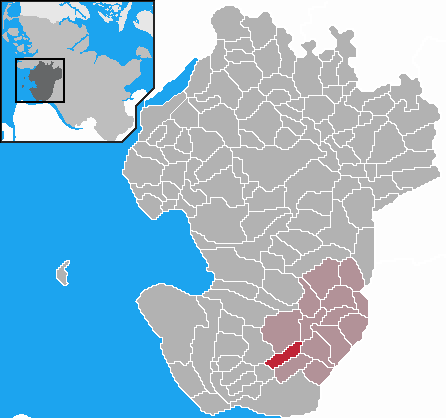
- Location of Dingen, Dithmarschen within Dithmarschen district
- Interactive map of Dingen, Dithmarschen
- Location within Germany Location within Schleswig-Holstein
- Coordinates: 53°58′N 9°7′E
- Country: Germany
- State: Schleswig-Holstein
- District: Dithmarschen
- Municipal assoc.: Burg-Sankt Michaelisdonn
- Subdivisions: 5

Government
  - Mayor: Karl-Heinz Reiche (SPD)

Area
  - Total: 7.01 km^{2} (2.71 sq mi)
- Elevation: 2 m (6.6 ft)

Population (2025-12-31)
  - Total: 645
  - Density: 92.0/km^{2} (238/sq mi)
- Time zone: UTC+01:00 (CET)
  - Summer (DST): UTC+02:00 (CEST)
- Postal codes: 25715
- Dialling codes: 04851, 04855
- Vehicle registration: HEI
- Website: www.amt-edd-stm.de

Dingen (German pronunciation: [ˈdɪŋən]) is a municipality in the district of Dithmarschen, in Schleswig-Holstein, Germany.
