= Nordermeldorf =

- Municipality
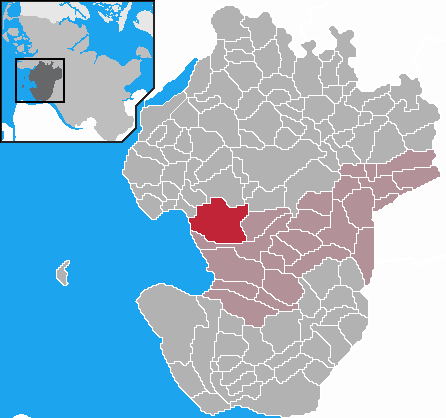
- Location of Nordermeldorf within Dithmarschen district
- Interactive map of Nordermeldorf
- Location within Germany Location within Schleswig-Holstein
- Coordinates: 54°7′N 9°1′E
- Country: Germany
- State: Schleswig-Holstein
- District: Dithmarschen
- Municipal assoc.: Mitteldithmarschen
- Subdivisions: 3

Government
  - Mayor: Peter Maaßen

Area
  - Total: 34.1 km^{2} (13.2 sq mi)
- Elevation: 1 m (3.3 ft)

Population (2025-12-31)
  - Total: 609
  - Density: 17.9/km^{2} (46.3/sq mi)
- Time zone: UTC+01:00 (CET)
  - Summer (DST): UTC+02:00 (CEST)
- Postal codes: 25704
- Dialling codes: 04832, 04839
- Vehicle registration: HEI

Nordermeldorf is a borough in the district of Dithmarschen, in Schleswig-Holstein, Germany.

== Geography ==
Nordermeldorf lies within a marsh and borders upon a polder stretching to the North Sea and passes by the Nationalpark Schleswig-Holsteinisches Wattenmeer. The borough lies directly on the cross road between Meldorf and Wöhrden.

== History ==
On January 1, 1974, the previously separate boroughs of Barsfleth, Christianskoog und Thalingburen combined to become Nordermeldorf.
