= Hochdonn =

- Municipality
- Flag Coat of arms

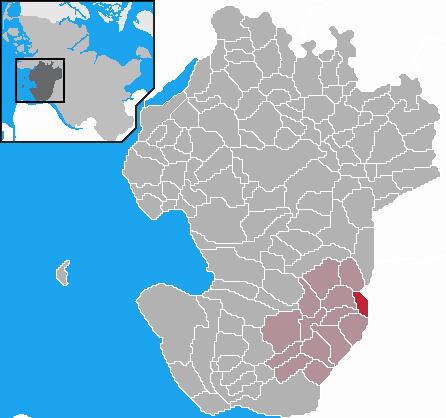
- Location of Hochdonn within Dithmarschen district
- Interactive map of Hochdonn
- Location within Germany Location within Schleswig-Holstein
- Coordinates: 54°2′N 9°17′E
- Country: Germany
- State: Schleswig-Holstein
- District: Dithmarschen
- Municipal assoc.: Burg-Sankt Michaelisdonn

Government
  - Mayor: Gerd Raabe (CDU)

Area
  - Total: 5.46 km^{2} (2.11 sq mi)
- Elevation: 4 m (13 ft)

Population (2025-12-31)
  - Total: 1,076
  - Density: 197/km^{2} (510/sq mi)
- Time zone: UTC+01:00 (CET)
  - Summer (DST): UTC+02:00 (CEST)
- Postal codes: 25712
- Dialling codes: 04825, 04827
- Vehicle registration: HEI

Hochdonn (German pronunciation: [ˈhoːxdɔn]) is a municipality in the district of Dithmarschen, in Schleswig-Holstein, Germany.
