= Sankt Michaelisdonn =

- Municipality
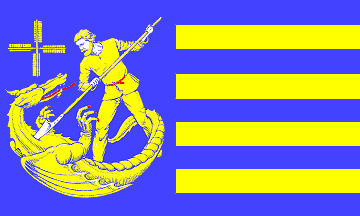
- Flag Coat of arms

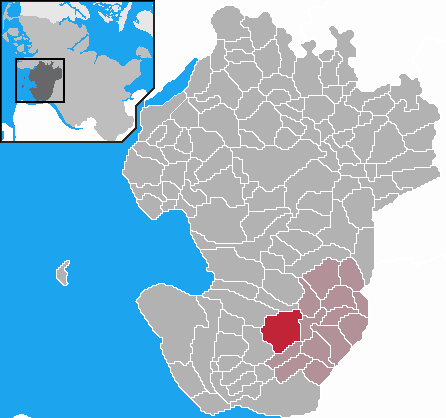
- Location of Sankt Michaelisdonn within Dithmarschen district
- Interactive map of Sankt Michaelisdonn
- Location within Germany Location within Schleswig-Holstein
- Coordinates: 53°59′50″N 9°7′19″E
- Country: Germany
- State: Schleswig-Holstein
- District: Dithmarschen
- Municipal assoc.: Burg-Sankt Michaelisdonn
- Subdivisions: 4

Government
  - Mayor: Volker Nielsen (CDU)

Area
  - Total: 23.06 km^{2} (8.90 sq mi)
- Elevation: 3 m (9.8 ft)

Population (2025-12-31)
  - Total: 3,473
  - Density: 150.6/km^{2} (390.1/sq mi)
- Time zone: UTC+01:00 (CET)
  - Summer (DST): UTC+02:00 (CEST)
- Postal codes: 25693
- Dialling codes: 04853
- Vehicle registration: HEI
- Website: www.amt-edd-stm.de

Sankt Michaelisdonn (German pronunciation: [zaŋkt mɪçaˈeːlɪsdɔn]) is a municipality in the district of Dithmarschen, in Schleswig-Holstein, Germany.
