= Barlt =

- Municipality
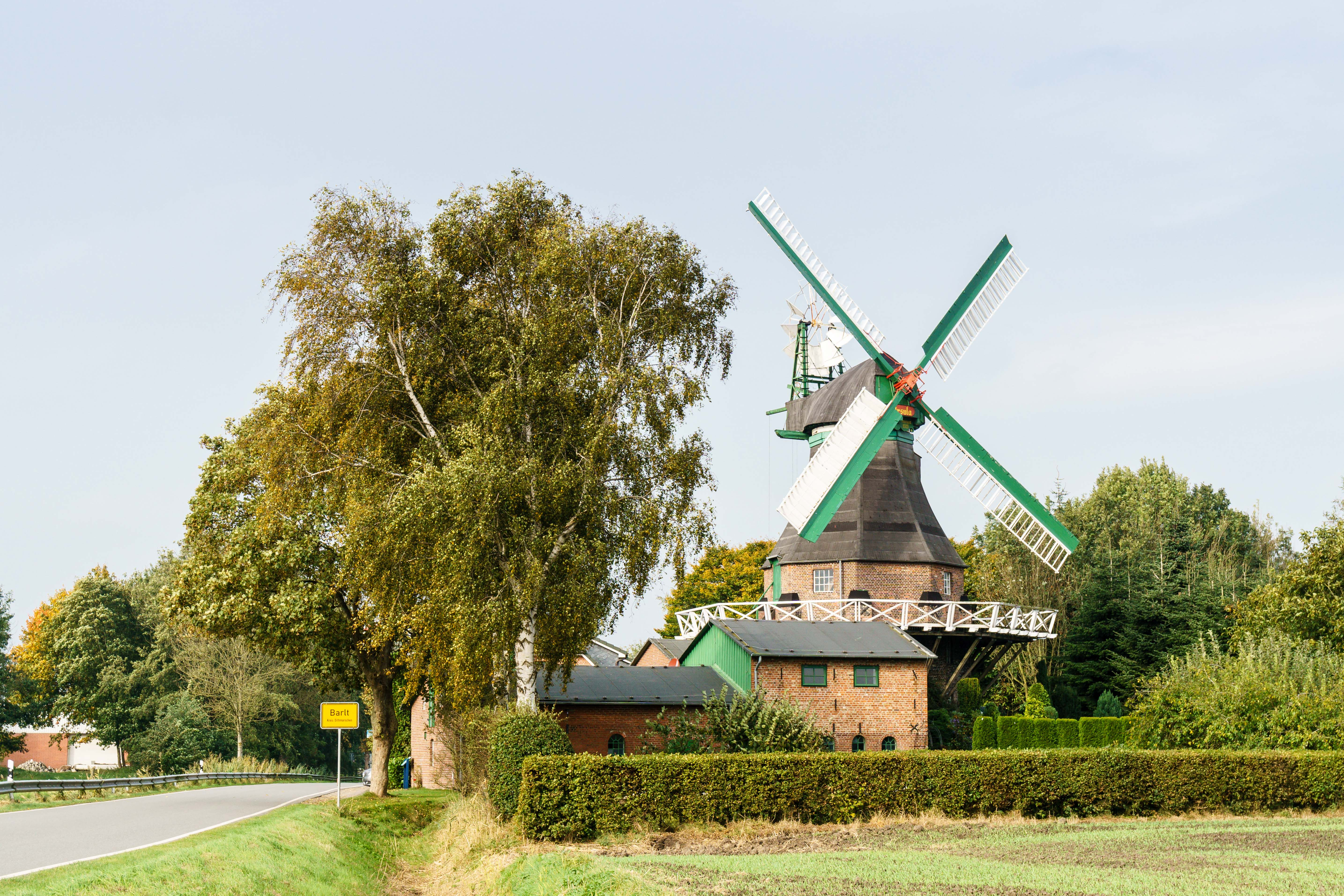

- Coat of arms

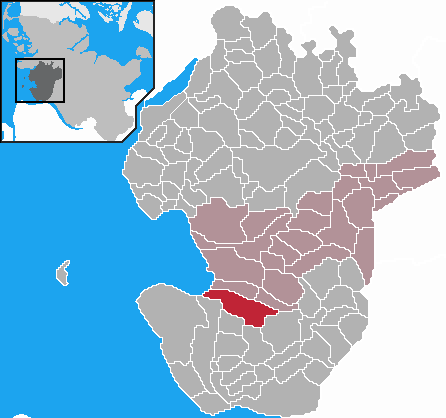
- Location of Barlt within Dithmarschen district
- Interactive map of Barlt
- Location within Germany Location within Schleswig-Holstein
- Coordinates: 54°01′8″N 09°03′34″E
- Country: Germany
- State: Schleswig-Holstein
- District: Dithmarschen
- Municipal assoc.: Mitteldithmarschen
- Subdivisions: 3

Government
  - Mayor: Moritz Maes (CDU)

Area
  - Total: 22.88 km^{2} (8.83 sq mi)
- Elevation: 2 m (6.6 ft)

Population (2025-12-31)
  - Total: 750
  - Density: 33/km^{2} (85/sq mi)
- Time zone: UTC+01:00 (CET)
  - Summer (DST): UTC+02:00 (CEST)
- Postal codes: 25719
- Dialling codes: 04857
- Vehicle registration: HEI
- Website: www.barlt.de

Barlt (German pronunciation: [baʁlt]) is a municipality in the district of Dithmarschen, in Schleswig-Holstein, Germany.

== People ==
- Gustav Frenssen (1863-1945), German novelist
