= Eddelak =

- Municipality
- Flag Coat of arms

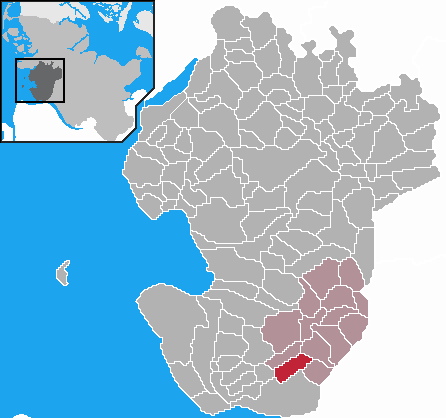
- Location of Eddelak within Dithmarschen district
- Interactive map of Eddelak
- Location within Germany Location within Schleswig-Holstein
- Coordinates: 53°57′N 9°9′E
- Country: Germany
- State: Schleswig-Holstein
- District: Dithmarschen
- Municipal assoc.: Burg-Sankt Michaelisdonn
- Subdivisions: 3

Government
  - Mayor: Hauke Oeser (EWG)

Area
  - Total: 9.22 km^{2} (3.56 sq mi)
- Elevation: 2 m (6.6 ft)

Population (2025-12-31)
  - Total: 1,332
  - Density: 144/km^{2} (374/sq mi)
- Time zone: UTC+01:00 (CET)
  - Summer (DST): UTC+02:00 (CEST)
- Postal codes: 25715
- Dialling codes: 04855
- Vehicle registration: HEI
- Website: www.amt-burg-st-michaelisdonn.de/

Eddelak is a municipality in the district of Dithmarschen, in Schleswig-Holstein, Germany.
