= Krumstedt =

- Municipality
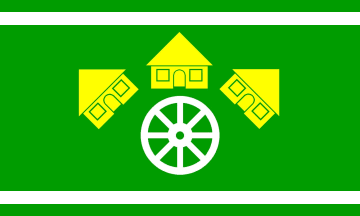
- Flag Coat of arms

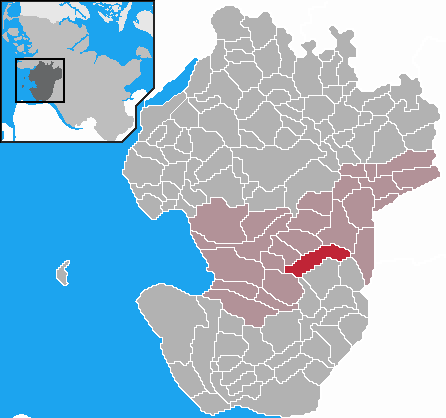
- Location of Krumstedt within Dithmarschen district
- Interactive map of Krumstedt
- Location within Germany Location within Schleswig-Holstein
- Coordinates: 54°4′N 9°10′E
- Country: Germany
- State: Schleswig-Holstein
- District: Dithmarschen
- Municipal assoc.: Mitteldithmarschen

Government
  - Mayor: Werner Stonus

Area
  - Total: 15.89 km^{2} (6.14 sq mi)
- Elevation: 8 m (26 ft)

Population (2025-12-31)
  - Total: 522
  - Density: 32.9/km^{2} (85.1/sq mi)
- Time zone: UTC+01:00 (CET)
  - Summer (DST): UTC+02:00 (CEST)
- Postal codes: 25727
- Dialling codes: 04830
- Vehicle registration: HEI
- Website: www.amt-meldorf- land.de

Krumstedt is a municipality in the district of Dithmarschen, in Schleswig-Holstein, Germany.
