= Süderhastedt =

- Municipality
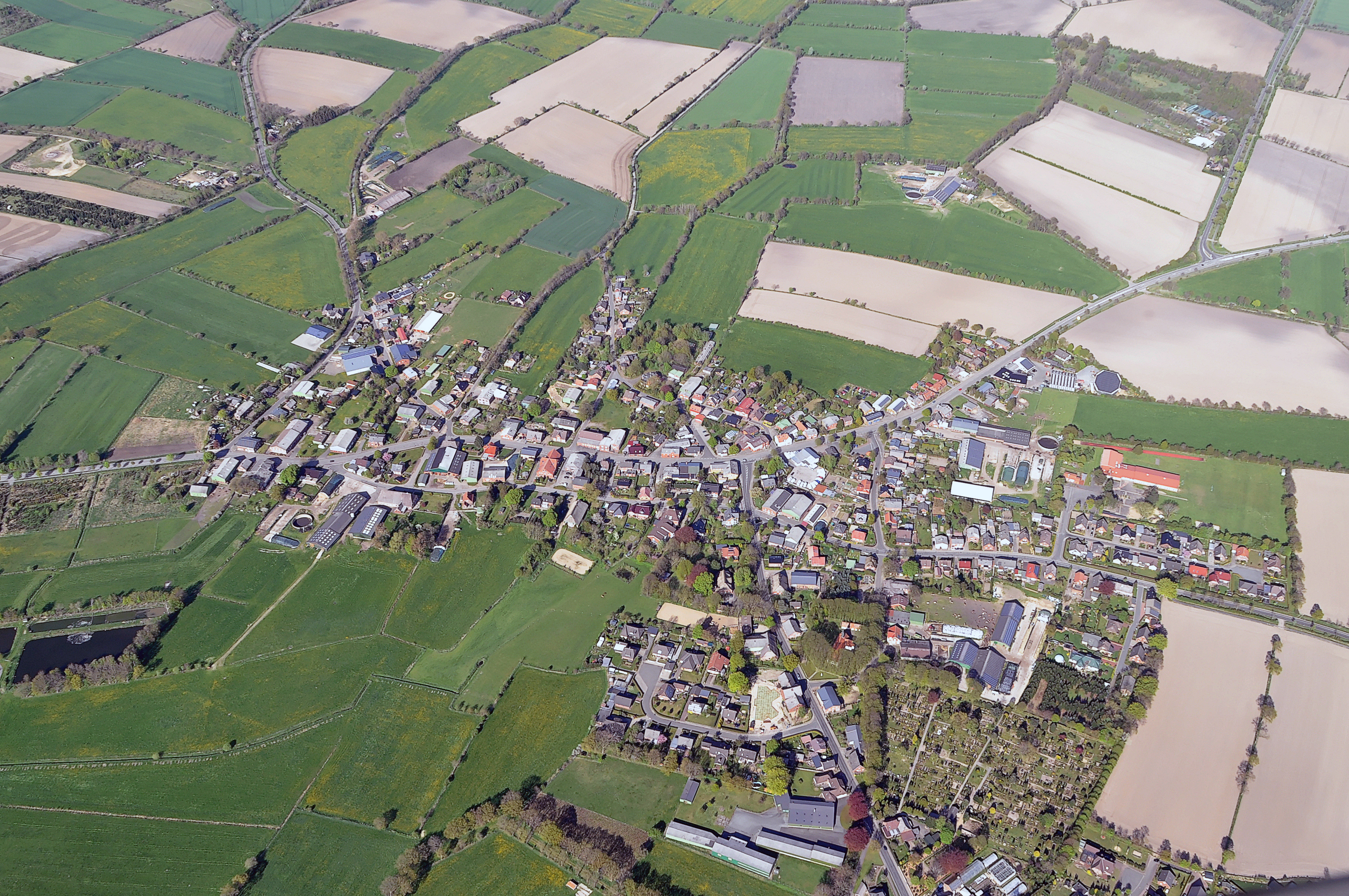

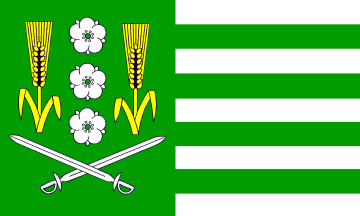
- Flag Coat of arms

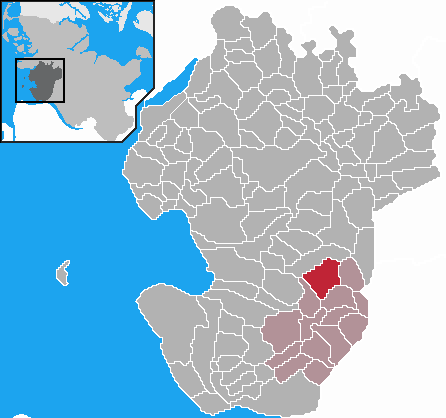
- Location of Süderhastedt within Dithmarschen district
- Interactive map of Süderhastedt
- Location within Germany Location within Schleswig-Holstein
- Coordinates: 54°3′N 9°13′E
- Country: Germany
- State: Schleswig-Holstein
- District: Dithmarschen
- Municipal assoc.: Burg-Sankt Michaelisdonn
- Subdivisions: 4

Government
  - Mayor: Roland Ruesch (CDU)

Area
  - Total: 15.74 km^{2} (6.08 sq mi)
- Elevation: 14 m (46 ft)

Population (2025-12-31)
  - Total: 795
  - Density: 50.5/km^{2} (131/sq mi)
- Time zone: UTC+01:00 (CET)
  - Summer (DST): UTC+02:00 (CEST)
- Postal codes: 25727
- Dialling codes: 04830
- Vehicle registration: HEI

Süderhastedt is a municipality in the district of Dithmarschen, in Schleswig-Holstein, Germany.
