= Heilshoop =

- Municipality
- Coat of arms

- Location of Heilshoop within Stormarn district
- Interactive map of Heilshoop
- Location within Germany Location within Schleswig-Holstein
- Coordinates: 53°53′14″N 10°31′50″E
- Country: Germany
- State: Schleswig-Holstein
- District: Stormarn
- Municipal assoc.: Nordstormarn

Government
  - Mayor: Jan Steen

Area
  - Total: 8.5 km^{2} (3.3 sq mi)
- Elevation: 19 m (62 ft)

Population (2025-12-31)
  - Total: 560
  - Density: 66/km^{2} (170/sq mi)
- Time zone: UTC+01:00 (CET)
  - Summer (DST): UTC+02:00 (CEST)
- Postal codes: 23619
- Dialling codes: 04506
- Vehicle registration: OD
- Website: www.amt-nordstormarn.de

Heilshoop is a municipality in the district of Stormarn, in Schleswig-Holstein, Germany.

== Geography ==
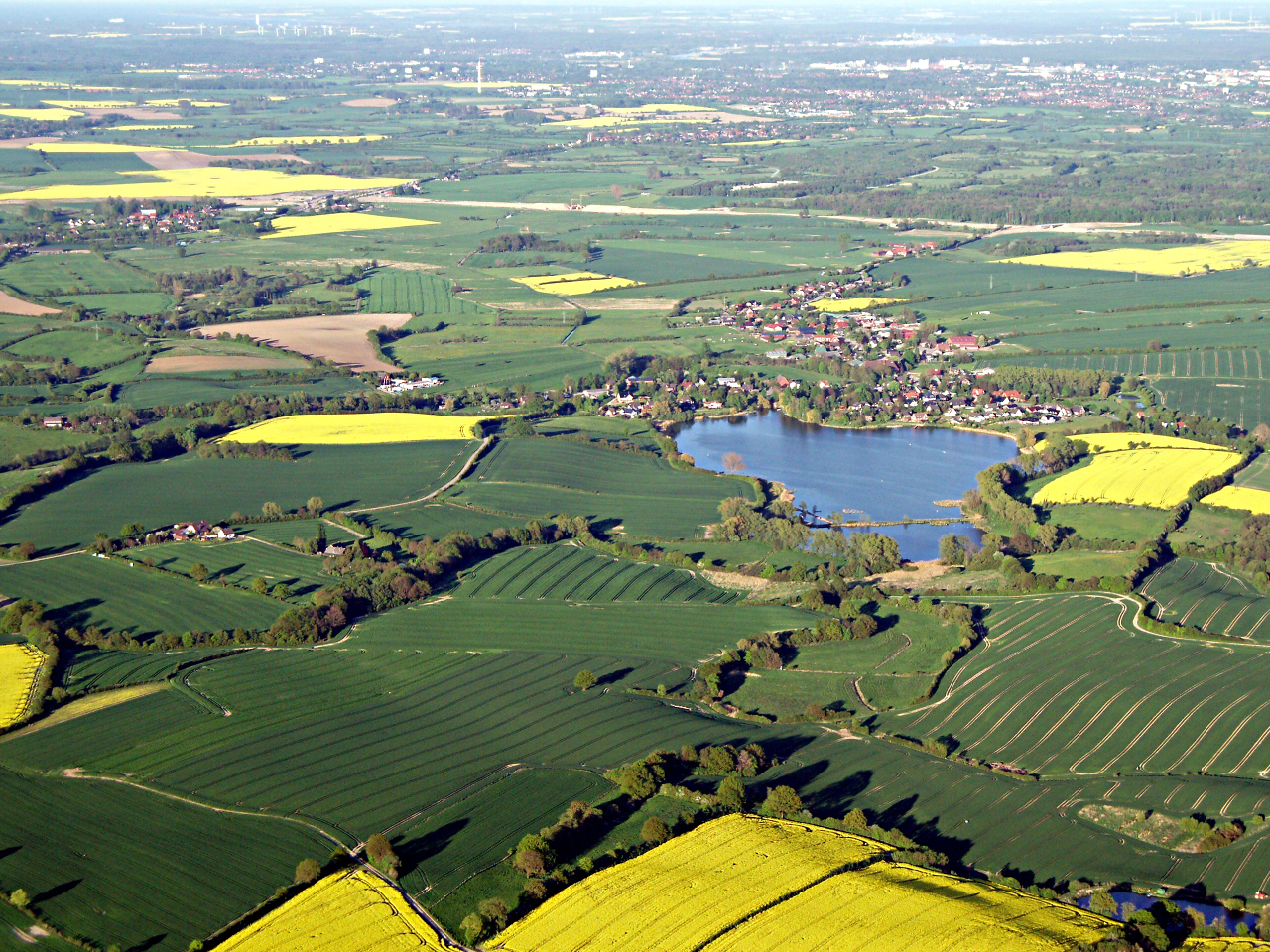

Heilshoop is located on the Heilsau.

== History ==
Heilshoop was first mentioned in historical records in 1189 as Haleshope, when it belonged to Reinfeld Abbey, a Cistercian monastery. It was probably founded earlier by Slavs in the Boule gau. Following the Reformation and the subsequent dissolution of the monastery, Heilshoop became part of the ducal Amt of Reinfeld. Serfdom was abolished in 1787.

After the Prussian annexation of Schleswig-Holstein in 1867, Heilshoop became part of the newly established Stormarn district. With the introduction of the Prussian municipal constitution in 1889, it became part of the Zarpen administrative district, which was reorganized as the Amt Zarpen in 1948. Since the municipal reform in Schleswig-Holstein in 1972, Heilshoop has been part of the Amt Nordstormarn.

== Religion ==
Since the 13th century, Heilshoop has belonged to the Zarpen parish.

== Culture and sights ==
A bathing area is located on the eastern shore of the Moorteich. It has no lifeguard supervision and does not meet the standards and requirements set by the European Union and the state of Schleswig-Holstein for designated bathing waters. The water quality at the bathing area is regularly monitored by the public health authorities.
