= Retzlaff =

Retzlaff, less commonly Retzlaw, is a surname. Although mainly found in German-speaking countries, it is derived from Slavic personal names Radoslav or Ratislav. Notable people with the surname include:

- Brendon Retzlaff (born 1969), Australian rules footballer
- Bryce Retzlaff (born 1991), Australian rules football player
- Charley Retzlaff (1904–1970), American heavyweight boxer
- Erich Retzlaff (1899–1993), German photographer
- Jake Retzlaff, college American football quarterback
- Misa Telefoni Retzlaff (born 1952), Samoan politician
- Nick Retzlaff (born 1996), American soccer player
- Parker Retzlaff (born 2003), American race car driver
- Pete Retzlaff (1931–2020), American football player and manager
- Karl Retzlaw (1896–1979), German politician
- Sterling Retzlaff (born 2001), American Model and Reality TV star

== See also ==
- Ratzlaff
- Retzlaff Farmstead
