= Trittau (Amt) =

Amt Trittau
- Amt
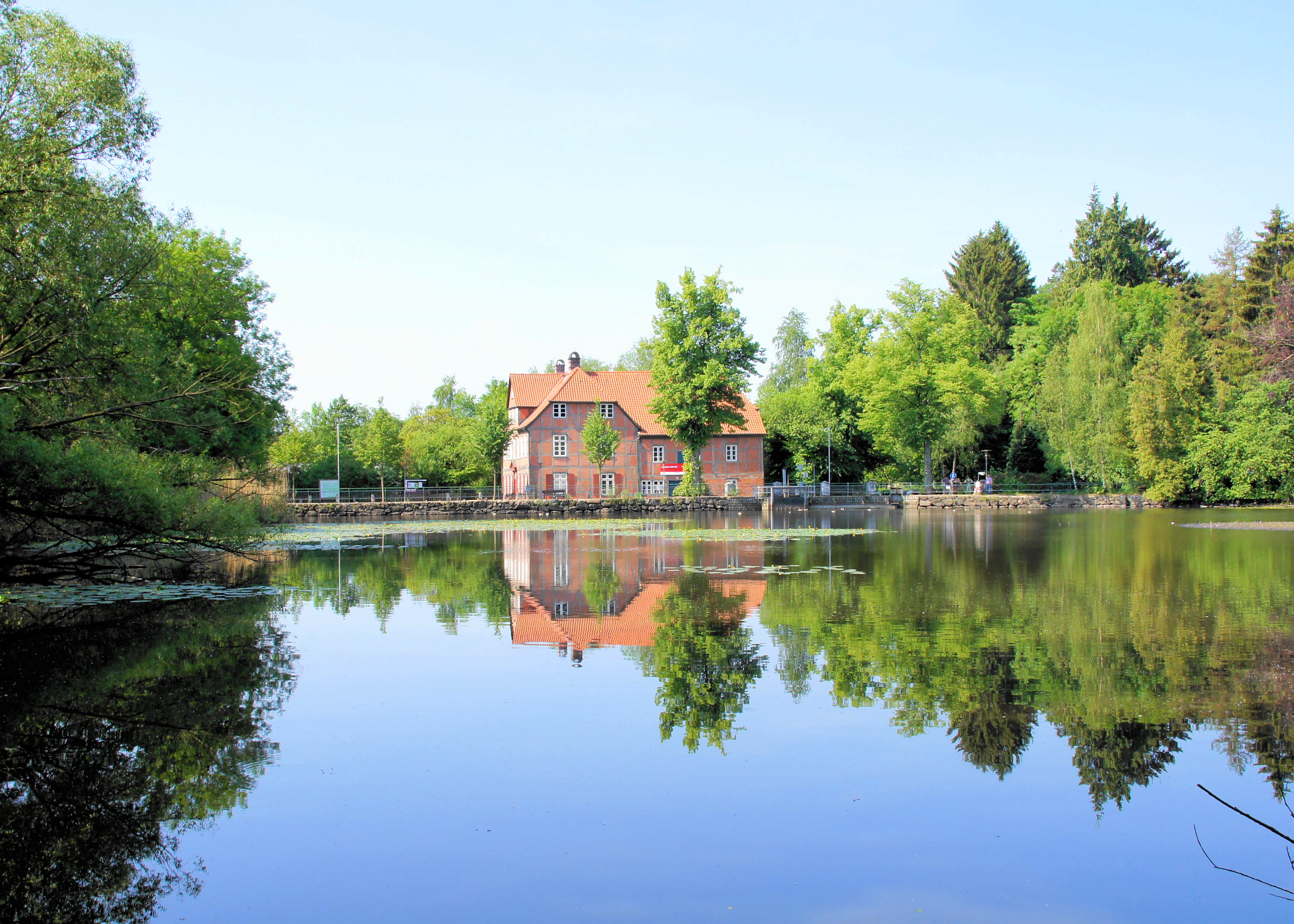

- Coat of arms

- Location of Amt Trittau within Stormarn district
- Interactive map of Amt Trittau
- Location within Germany Location within Schleswig-Holstein
- Country: Germany
- State: Schleswig-Holstein
- District: Stormarn
- Seat: Trittau

Government
  - Mayor: Ulrike Stentzler

Area
  - Total: 93.35 km^{2} (36.04 sq mi)
- Elevation: 36–100 m (118–328 ft)

Population (2025-12-31)
  - Total: 19,044
  - Density: 204.0/km^{2} (528.4/sq mi)
- Time zone: UTC+01:00 (CET)
  - Summer (DST): UTC+02:00 (CEST)
- Postal codes: 22929, 22946, 22952, 22956, 22969
- Dialling codes: 04104, 04154, 04159, 04534
- Vehicle registration: OD
- Website: www.amt-trittau.de

Trittau is an Amt ("collective municipality") in the district of Stormarn, in Schleswig-Holstein, Germany. The seat of the Amt is in Trittau.

== Municipalities ==
The Amt Trittau consists of the following municipalities:

| Municipality | Coat of arms | Summary |
|---|---|---|
| Grande | | Grande is located on the river Bille and on the edge of the Sachsenwald. |
| Grönwohld | | Grönwohld is located on the northern edge of the forest Hahnheide. |
| Großensee | | Großensee with its location directly on the lake of the same name is a popular destination. |
| Hamfelde/Stormarn | | Hamfelde/Stormarn is located between the forest Hahnheide and the river Bille, next to its sister municipality Hamfelde/Lauenburg. |
| Hohenfelde | | Hohenfelde is the smallest municipality of the Amt Trittau and the district Stormarn. |
| Köthel/Stormarn | | Köthel/Stormarn is located on the edge of the forest Hahnheide, right next to its sister municipality Köthel/Lauenburg. |
| Lütjensee | | Lütjensee is located in the heart of the ″Stormarn Switzerland″ on the lake of the same name. |
| Rausdorf | | Rausdorf is located on the forest ″Grander Tannen″ and the river Corbek. |
| Trittau | | Trittau has been the center of a vast rural area for centuries. |
| Witzhave | | Witzhave is rural, but has as the only municipality a direct highway access. |

== Sister cities ==
The following cities are twinned with Trittau (Amt):

- Saarijärvi, Central Finland, Finland
- Communauté de communes Sèvre et Loire, Loire-Atlantique, France
- Gmina Wieliszew, Poland
- Totton and Eling, United Kingdom
