= Siek =

Siek may refer to:

- Siek (landform), the name for a type of hollow common in parts of Germany
- Siek, Holstein, a municipality in Germany
  - Siek (Amt)
- Sikh, historically also sometimes spelt Siek, a follower of Sikhism
