= Evelyn Juers =

Australian writer and publisher (born 1950)

- Born: 6 March 1950 (age 76); Neritz, Germany
- Citizenship: Australia
- Education: University of Essex
- Occupation: Writer

Evelyn Juers (born 6 March 1950) is an Australian writer and publisher.

Juers was born in Neritz, Germany, moved to Australia in 1960, and has lived in Hamburg, Sydney, London and Geneva. She has a PhD from University of Essex on the Brontës and the practice of biography. As an essayist and an art and literary critic, she has contributed to a wide range of Australian and international publications. She has written on women’s literature, weavers, travellers, explorers, birds, libraries, and on the work of Imants Tillers, Mike Parr, Bill Henson, Narelle Jubelin, Anne Ferran, Anne Zahalka, Robert Mapplethorpe, Guan Wei, Jacqueline Rose, Albert Namatjira, Margaret Michaelis, Emily Brontë, Bertold Brecht, Christa Wolf, Kate Jennings, W.G. Sebald, Virginia Woolf, Brian Castro, Nicholas Jose, J. M. Coetzee, Helen Garner, Charmian Clift. With her husband Ivor Indyk, she co-founded the literary magazine HEAT, and is co-publisher of the Giramondo Publishing company.

== House of Exile ==
Her book House of Exile (2008), subtitled The Life and Times of Heinrich Mann and Nelly Kroeger-Mann, is a collective biography. It is based on published sources, interviews and extensive archival research in Europe and America. House of Exile was shortlisted for the Victorian Premier's Award for Non-Fiction (Nettie Palmer Prize for Non-fiction), the West Australian Book Awards, the National Biography Award, and the 2009 ALS Gold Medal. In 2009 it won the Prime Minister's Literary Awards in the non-fiction category.

House of Exile is published in the US by Farrar, Straus & Giroux, in the UK by Allen Lane /Penguin, in France (Chemins d’Exil) by Autrement, in Italy (La Casa dell’Esilio) by Saggi Bompiani, and in Spain (La Casa del exilio) by Circe.

== The Recluse ==
The Recluse (2012) is a biographical essay about solitude and the life of Eliza Emily Donnithorne, who was born 9 July 1821 in Capetown, South Africa, grew up in India and England, and died 20 May 1886 in Sydney, Australia. She is buried at Camperdown Cemetery in Newtown, NSW. The book examines the literary myth that she was the model for Miss Havisham in Charles Dickens’ novel Great Expectations. It was shortlisted for the 2014 Magarey medal for biography.

== The Dancer ==
The Dancer tells the story of a young woman who comes of age in the 1970s, her origins and influences and adventures, and the tragic circumstances of her early death in a remote hilltown in southern India. It is a literary biography of the experimental dance artist and choreographer Philippa Cullen, who was born 24 March 1950 in Melbourne, Australia, and died 3 July 1975 in Kodaikanal, Tamil Nadu, India. She studied all forms of dance and dance-ideas. To create her own soundscapes, she developed theremins and movement-sensitive floors, which she called body-instruments. She believed that dance is an outer manifestation of inner energy and that it articulates more clearly than language. From the late 1960s to the early 1970s, she worked with other dancers and performers, musicians, engineers and visual artists, including electronic-music composer Greg Schiemer in Australia, composer Karlheinz Stockhausen in Germany, and academics at the Institute of Sonology in the Netherlands. With the writer George Alexander she created her sound-ballet Utter. With Stockhausen she collaborated on the meditative work Inori. The curator Kiffy Rubbo wrote: “It is almost impossible to describe the special quality of Philippa’s dance – her ability to communicate and to liberate the energy and beauty of the body...her stillness and energy...her singular spirit”.

== Bibliography ==
=== Books ===
- House of Exile (2008)
- The Recluse (2012)
- The Dancer: a Biography for Philippa Cullen (2021)

=== Essays ===
- Juers, Evelyn (October 2023). "Totality in Wallal. Woolf in Yorkshire. Einstein in Scharbeutz". HEAT (Series 3 Number 11).
- Juers, Evelyn (April 2025). "Baltic Blues. And Other Colours". Sydney Review of Books.

=== Articles ===
- Juers, Evelyn (June 2011). "'Take this waltz' : leaving Vienna, city of windows". Australian Book Review (332): 18–19.
- Juers, Evelyn (March 2012). "The burdens and genius of Charles Dickens". Australian Book Review (no. 339)
- Juers, Evelyn (January 29, 2013). "Tripped up, tripped out: Questions of Travel by Michelle de Kretser". Sydney Review of Books.
- Juers, Evelyn (September 6, 2013). "Nature's Art". Sydney Review of Books.
- Juers, Evelyn (August 8, 2014). "Forms of surveillance: Bertolt Brecht: A Literary Life by Stephen Parker". Sydney Review of Books
- Juers, Evelyn (February 7, 2017). "Wild Things: The Invention of Nature by Andrea Wulf". Sydney Review of Books.
- Juers, Evelyn (January–February 2017). "Cursed Legacy: The Tragic Life of Klaus Mann by Frederic Spotts". Australian Book Review (no. 388).
- Juers, Evelyn (July 3, 2018). "Something Terrific: Emily Brontë's 200 Years". Sydney Review of Books.
- Juers, Evelyn (16 September 2021). "A great takes on a great: Colm Toibin's ambitious new novel". Sydney Morning Herald.
- Juers, Evelyn (April 4, 2022). "The Witchery of Mallacoota Or, What Makes a True Naturalist?". Sydney Review of Books.
