= Köthel =

Köthel (German pronunciation: [ˈkøːtl̩]) is a village in Schleswig-Holstein, Germany. It is divided by the Bille river into two parts which are located in different Landkreis:

- Köthel, Lauenburg
- Köthel, Stormarn
