= Wesenberg =

Wesenberg may refer to:

- The German name for Rakvere, a town in Estonia
- Wesenberg, Mecklenburg-Vorpommern, part of the Amt Mecklenburgische Kleinseenplatte, Mecklenburg-Western Pomerania, Germany
- Wesenberg, Schleswig-Holstein, part of the Amt Nordstormarn, Schleswig-Holstein, Germany
