= Grabau =

Grabau is a surname. Notable people with the surname include:

- Aaron Grabau (born 1978), Australian basketball player
- Amadeus William Grabau (1870–1946), geologist
- Charles Grabau, jurist
- Johannes Andreas August Grabau (1804–1879), theologian
- Lorenzo Grabau (born 1965), financier

== See also ==
- Dorsum Grabau, geological feature on the moon
- Grabau, Lauenburg
- Grabau, Stormarn
