= Von Cossel =

Von Cossel is a surname. Notable people with the surname include:

- Hans-Detloff von Cossel (1916–1943), German Wehrmacht officer
- Paschen von Cossel (1714–1805), German jurist
