= Grande, Germany =

Grande
- Municipality
- Coat of arms

- Location of Grande within Stormarn district
- Interactive map of Grande
- Location within Germany Location within Schleswig-Holstein
- Coordinates: 53°34′53″N 10°23′21″E
- Country: Germany
- State: Schleswig-Holstein
- District: Stormarn
- Municipal assoc.: Trittau

Government
  - Mayor: Heinz Hoch

Area
  - Total: 7.86 km^{2} (3.03 sq mi)
- Elevation: 31 m (102 ft)

Population (2025-12-31)
  - Total: 719
  - Density: 91.5/km^{2} (237/sq mi)
- Time zone: UTC+01:00 (CET)
  - Summer (DST): UTC+02:00 (CEST)
- Postal codes: 22946
- Dialling codes: 04154
- Vehicle registration: OD
- Website: www.amt-trittau.de

Grande (German pronunciation: [ˈɡʁandə]; Low German: Grann) is a municipality in Germany, in the state (Bundesland) of Schleswig-Holstein, in the district (Kreis) of Stormarn.

== History ==
Grande was first documented in 1248. It should be older, however, as the document speaks of the change from the parish of Steinbek to the parish of Trittau. When the parish of Trittau was founded in 1248, it was responsible for the spiritual care of Grande.
At the end of the 13th century the monastery of Reinbek acquired the property of Grande. After the dissolution of the monastery in the context of the Reformation in 1529, the place came to the landlord's office in Reinbek. In 1609, Grande moved to the Land Treasury Amt Trittau as part of regional settlements. Grande belonged to the 17 so-called wood villages.

Since the introduction of the Prussian communal constitution in 1889, Grande belonged to Trittau, a town in the district of Stormarn, in 1948 in today's Amt Trittau.
