= Nordstormarn =

Amt in Schleswig-Holstein, Germany

- Amt
- Map of Stormarn highlighting Nordstormarn
- Interactive map of Nordstormarn
- Location within Germany Location within Schleswig-Holstein
- Coordinates: 53°50′N 10°31′E
- Country: Germany
- State: Schleswig-Holstein
- District: Stormarn
- Seat: Reinfeld
- Subdivisions: 12 municipalities

Area
  - Total: 123.35 km^{2} (47.63 sq mi)

Population (2025-12-31)
  - Total: 11,190
  - Density: 90.72/km^{2} (235.0/sq mi)
- Time zone: UTC+01:00 (CET)
  - Summer (DST): UTC+02:00 (CEST)
- Website: www.amt-nordstormarn.de

Nordstormarn is an Amt ("collective municipality") in the district of Stormarn, in Schleswig-Holstein, Germany. It is situated around Reinfeld, which is the seat of the Amt, but not part of it.

The Amt Nordstormarn consists of the following municipalities:

1. Badendorf
2. Barnitz
3. Feldhorst
4. Hamberge
5. Heidekamp
6. Heilshoop
7. Klein Wesenberg
8. Mönkhagen
9. Rehhorst
10. Wesenberg
11. Westerau
12. Zarpen
