= Hahnheide =

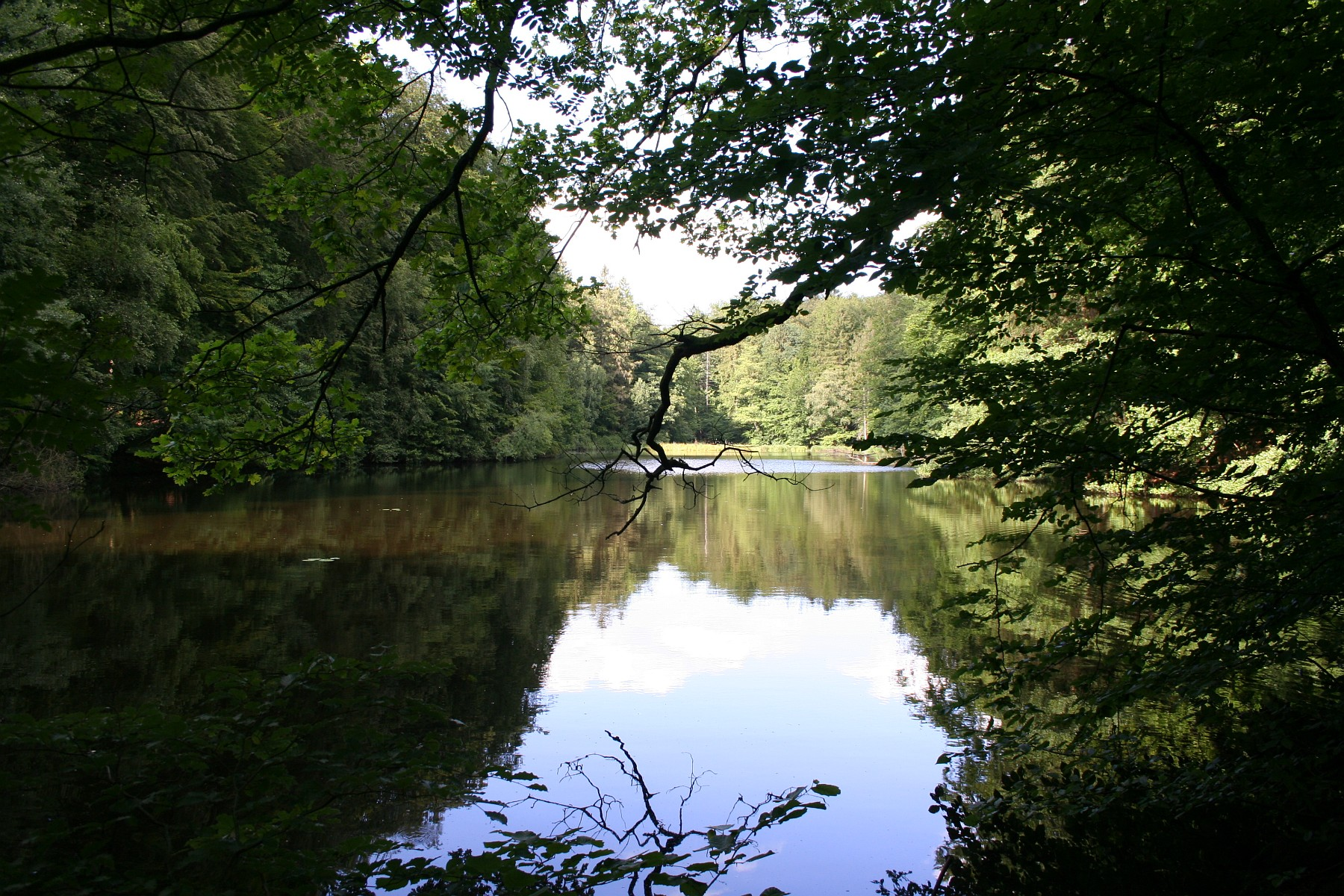
- Pond in the Hahnheide

- Location within Germany
- Interactive map of Hahnheide

Geography
- Location: Trittau, Germany
- Coordinates: 53°37′00″N 10°27′00″E
- Elevation: 100 m (330 ft)
- Area: 1,450 ha (3,600 acres)

The Hahnheide (German pronunciation: [ˈhaːnˌhaɪ̯də]) is a wooded moraine landscape in the east of the municipality Trittau (Stormarn County) in Schleswig-Holstein, in Germany.

The name Hahnheide means derived in today's language High Heath.

In the Middle Ages the Hahnheide was still associated with the Sachsenwald. Due to the economic use until 1821 the forest stock shrank more and more. In the middle of the 19th century, reforestation started, so that 95 % of the area is wooded today. The area was protected in 1938.

The second highest elevation in the 1,450 ha area is the Great Hahnheide Mountain (99 m above sea level). There, in 1974, after the former mayor Otto Hergenhan "Langer Otto" called, wooden observation tower was built and rebuilt in 2001 with a height of 27 m. The highest elevation, however, is the Little Hahnheide Mountain which, at 100m above sea level, is a little higher than its directly opposite counterpart. The tower was largely funded by private donations from the local citizens of Trittau and surrounding areas.

The 18th century road through the Hahnheide from Trittau to Hohenfelde consists of a cobblestone paved section on one side and an unpaved so-called summer path on the other side. It is now a listed building.

A 26-hectare area of the Hahnheide has been designated as a natural forest cell since 1982.

== Bibliography ==
- Graeber, Ulrike (1998). Stormarn, die grüne Brücke zwischen Hamburg und Lübeck [Stormarn, the green bridge between Hamburg and Lübeck] (in German). Bad Oldesloe: BQS-Verlag. pp. 159–161. ISBN 978-3-00-002571-6.
- Friz, Bernd (1991). Naturschutz und Landschaftspflege im Kreis Stormarn [Conservation in the district of Stormarn] (in German). Neumünster: Wachholtz. pp. 34–48. ISBN 978-3-529-07121-8.
