= Heinrich Christian Schumacher =

German-Danish astronomer and mathematician

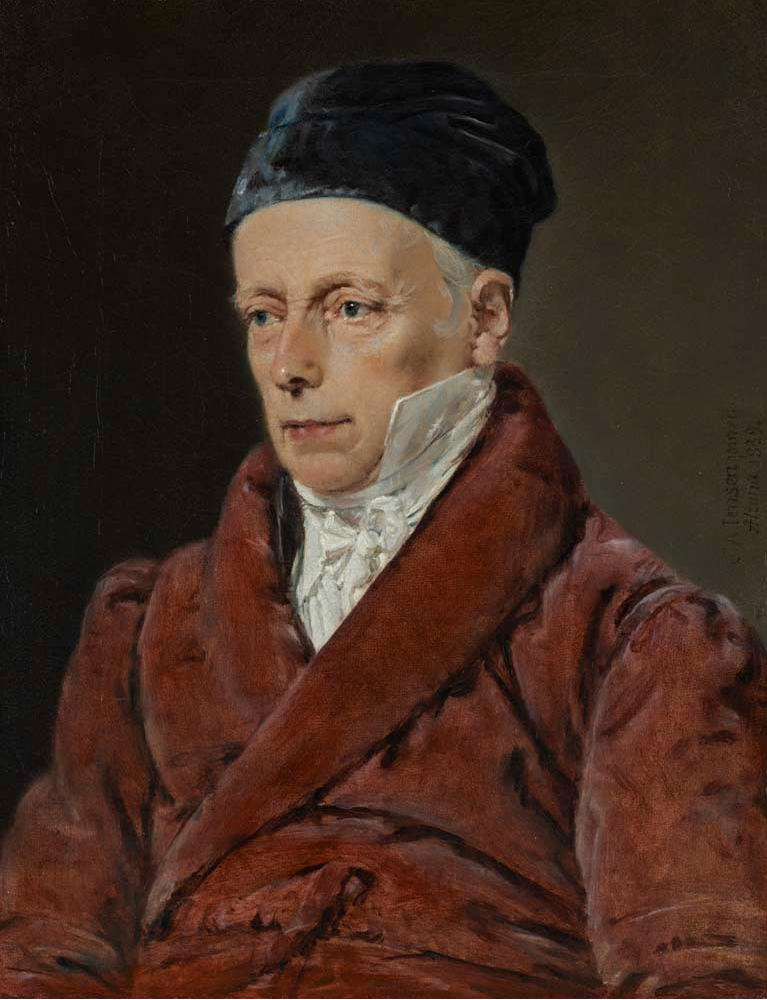
Portrait by C. A. Lorentzen, 1839.

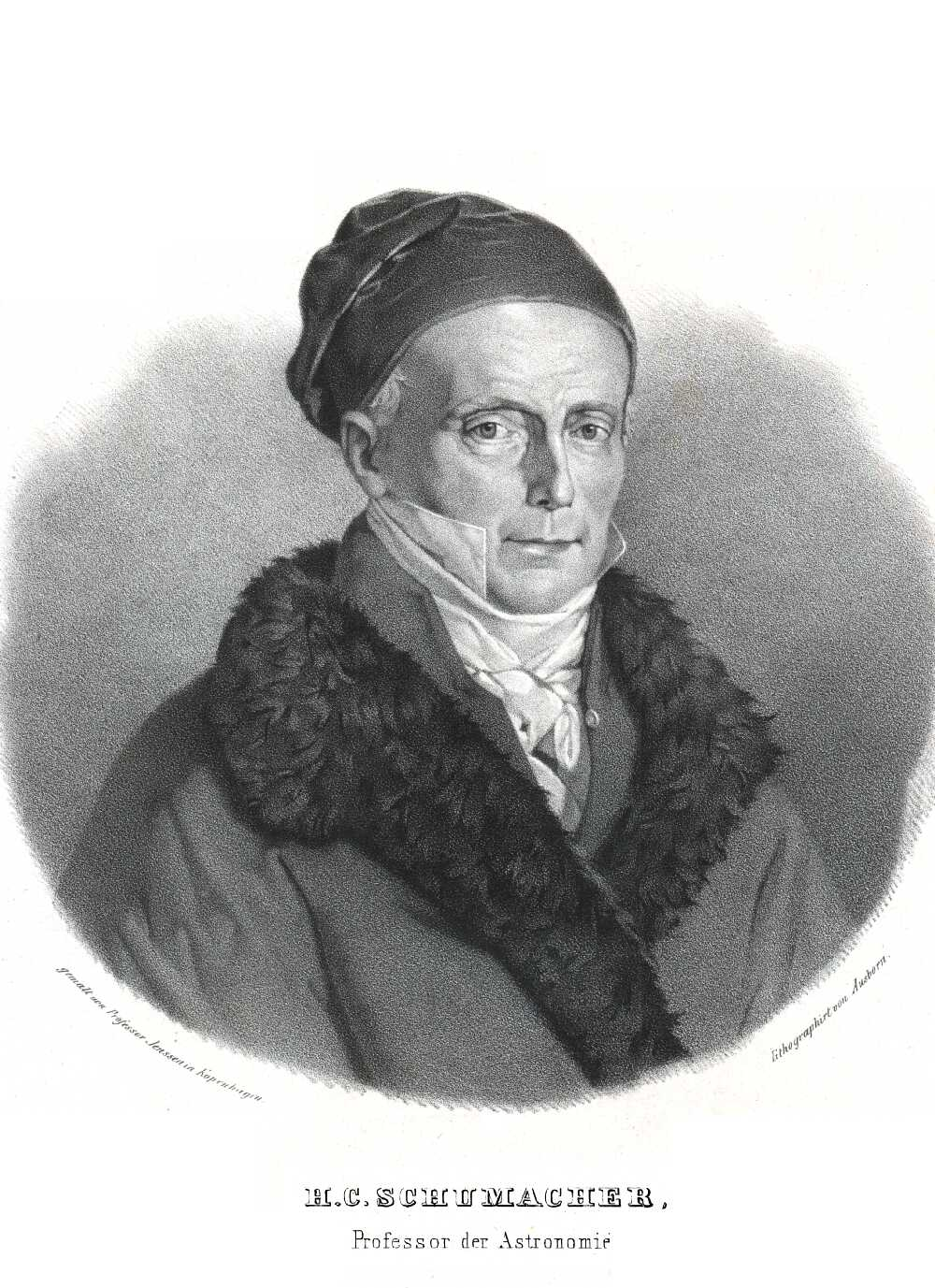
Heinrich Christian Schumacher

Prof Heinrich Christian Schumacher FRS(For) FRSE (3 September 1780 – 28 December 1850) was a German-Danish astronomer and mathematician.

== Biography ==
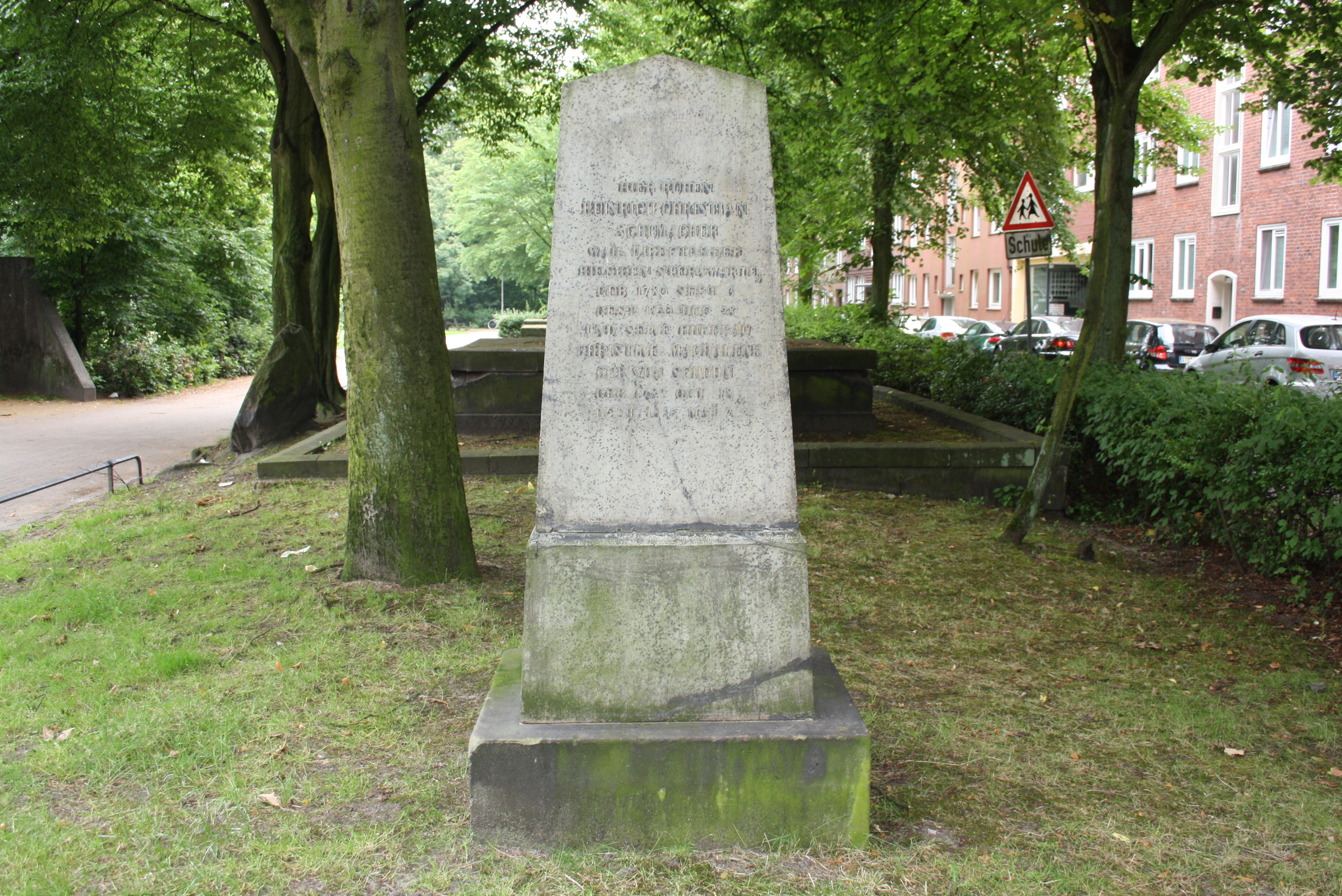
Monument marking the Heilig-Geist-Kirchhof in Hamburg-Altona

Schumacher was born at Bramstedt, in Holstein, near the German/Danish border. He was educated at Altona Gymnasium on the outskirts of Hamburg. He studied in Germany at Kiel, Jena, and Göttingen Universities as well as Copenhagen. He received a doctorate from Dorpat University in Russian Empire in 1807.

From 1808, he was adjunct professor of astronomy in Copenhagen. He directed the Mannheim observatory from 1813 to 1815, and then in 1815 was appointed Professor of Astronomy in Copenhagen and Director of the Observatory.

From 1817 he directed the triangulation of Holstein, to which a few years later was added a complete geodetic survey of Denmark (finished after his death). For the sake of the survey, Schumacher established the Altona Observatory at Altona, and resided there permanently. He cooperated with Carl Friedrich Gauss for the baseline measurement (Braak Base Line) in the village Braak near Hamburg in 1820.

He was elected a Foreign Fellow of the Royal Society of London in 1821, and a Fellow of the Royal Society of Edinburgh in 1822.

Schumacher was chiefly occupied with the publication of Ephemerides (11 parts, 1822–1832) and of the journal Astronomische Nachrichten (founded by himself in 1821 and still being published), of which he edited thirty-one volumes. In 1827 he was elected member of the Royal Swedish Academy of Sciences, and in 1829 he won the Gold Medal of the Royal Astronomical Society. Schumacher was elected a member of the American Philosophical Society in 1823 and a Foreign Honorary Member of the American Academy of Arts and Sciences in 1834. His portrait now hangs in the Development Office of the Royal Society.

He died in Altona on 28 December 1850. He was buried in the Heilig Geist Kirchhof (Holy Ghost Church) in Altona. The site is now marked by a stone memorial.

== Family ==
In 1812 he married Christine Madelaine Schoon.

Their son, Richard Schumacher (1827–1902), was his assistant from 1844 to 1850 at the conservatory at Altona. Having become assistant to Carlos Guillermo Moesta (1825–1884), director of the observatory at Santiago, in 1859, he was associated with the Chilean geodesic survey in 1864. Returning in 1869, he was appointed assistant astronomer at Altona in 1873, and afterwards at Kiel.

Schumacher's nephew, Christian Andreas Schumacher (1810–1854), was associated with the geodetic survey of Denmark from 1833 to 1838, and afterwards (1844–1845) improved the observatory at Pulkowa.

== Recognition ==
In 1935 the Moon crater Schumacher was named in his honour.
