= Indyk =

Indyk is a surname. Notable people with the surname include:

- Ivor Indyk (born 1949), Australian literary academic, editor and publisher; brother of Martin Indyk
- Martin Indyk (1951–2024), American diplomat and foreign relations analyst; brother of Ivor Indyk
- Piotr Indyk, Polish computer scientist
