= Klein Wesenberg =

- Municipality
- Coat of arms

- Location of Klein Wesenberg within Stormarn district
- Interactive map of Klein Wesenberg
- Location within Germany Location within Schleswig-Holstein
- Coordinates: 53°48′48″N 10°32′49″E
- Country: Germany
- State: Schleswig-Holstein
- District: Stormarn
- Municipal assoc.: Nordstormarn

Government
  - Mayor: Herbert David

Area
  - Total: 8.74 km^{2} (3.37 sq mi)
- Elevation: 14 m (46 ft)

Population (2025-12-31)
  - Total: 754
  - Density: 86.3/km^{2} (223/sq mi)
- Time zone: UTC+01:00 (CET)
  - Summer (DST): UTC+02:00 (CEST)
- Postal codes: 23860
- Dialling codes: 04533, 04539
- Vehicle registration: OD
- Website: www.amt- nordstormarn.de

Klein Wesenberg is a municipality in the district of Stormarn, in Schleswig-Holstein, Germany.
