= Meddewade =

- Municipality
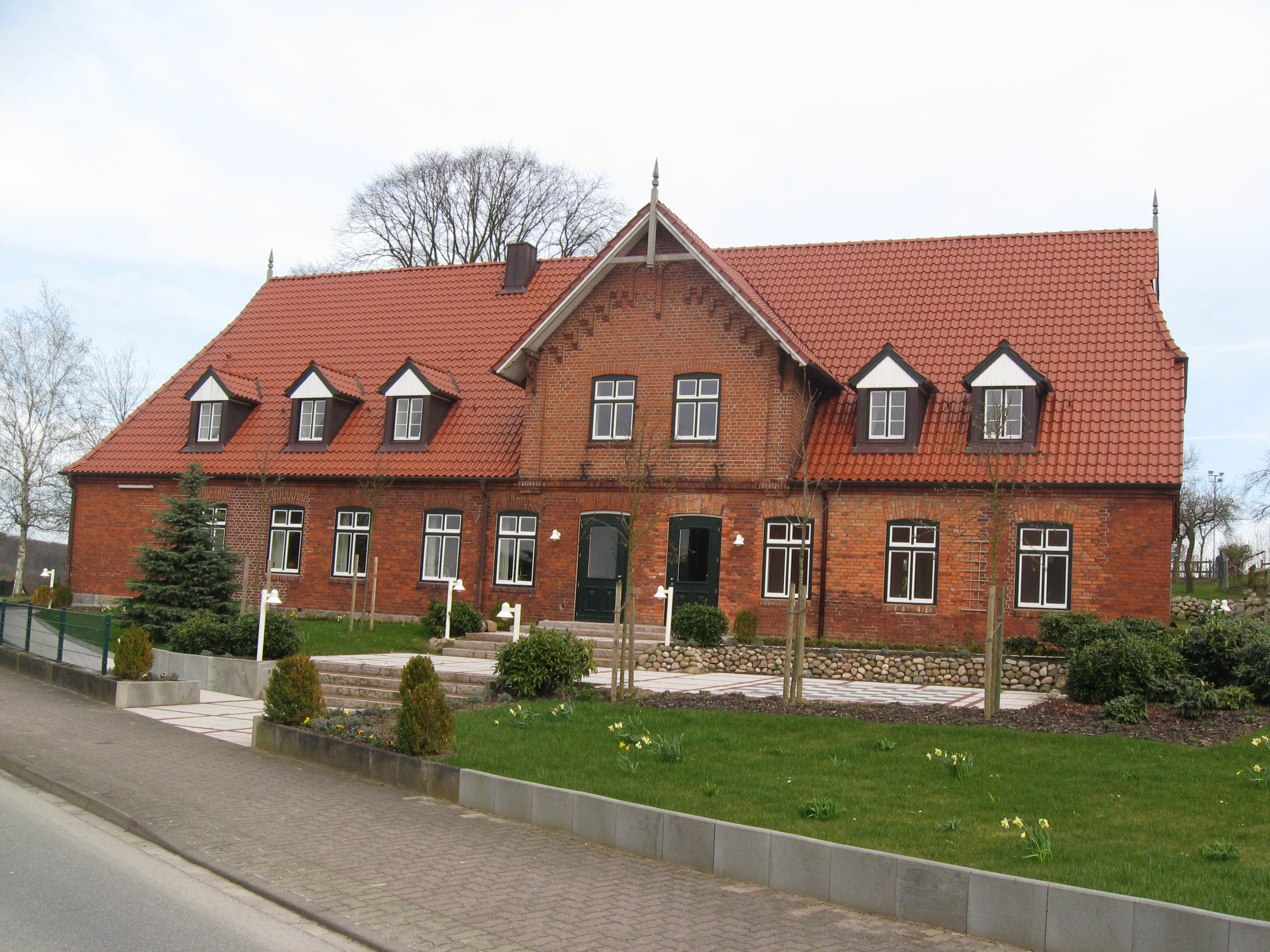
- Old school

- Coat of arms

- Location of Meddewade within Stormarn district
- Interactive map of Meddewade
- Location within Germany Location within Schleswig-Holstein
- Coordinates: 53°48′35″N 10°26′23″E
- Country: Germany
- State: Schleswig-Holstein
- District: Stormarn
- Municipal assoc.: Bad Oldesloe-Land

Government
  - Mayor: Marleen Wulf

Area
  - Total: 3.1 km^{2} (1.2 sq mi)
- Elevation: 37 m (121 ft)

Population (2025-12-31)
  - Total: 882
  - Density: 280/km^{2} (740/sq mi)
- Time zone: UTC+01:00 (CET)
  - Summer (DST): UTC+02:00 (CEST)
- Postal codes: 23847
- Dialling codes: 04531
- Vehicle registration: OD
- Website: www.amt-bad- oldesloe-land.de

Meddewade is a municipality in the district of Stormarn, in Schleswig-Holstein, Germany.
