= Delingsdorf =

- Municipality
- Coat of arms

- Location of Delingsdorf within Stormarn district
- Interactive map of Delingsdorf
- Location within Germany Location within Schleswig-Holstein
- Coordinates: 53°42′25″N 10°15′9″E
- Country: Germany
- State: Schleswig-Holstein
- District: Stormarn
- Municipal assoc.: Bargteheide-Land

Government
  - Mayor: Nicole Burmeister

Area
  - Total: 8.09 km^{2} (3.12 sq mi)
- Elevation: 46 m (151 ft)

Population (2025-12-31)
  - Total: 2,152
  - Density: 266/km^{2} (689/sq mi)
- Time zone: UTC+01:00 (CET)
  - Summer (DST): UTC+02:00 (CEST)
- Postal codes: 22941
- Dialling codes: 04532
- Vehicle registration: OD
- Website: www.delingsdorf.de

Delingsdorf is a municipality in the district of Stormarn, in Schleswig-Holstein, Germany.
