= Bargfeld-Stegen =

- Municipality
- Coat of arms

- Location of Bargfeld-Stegen within Stormarn district
- Interactive map of Bargfeld-Stegen
- Location within Germany Location within Schleswig-Holstein
- Coordinates: 53°46′4″N 10°11′15″E
- Country: Germany
- State: Schleswig-Holstein
- District: Stormarn
- Municipal assoc.: Bargteheide-Land

Government
  - Mayor: Andreas Gerckens (CDU)

Area
  - Total: 17.81 km^{2} (6.88 sq mi)
- Elevation: 30 m (98 ft)

Population (2025-12-31)
  - Total: 2,954
  - Density: 165.9/km^{2} (429.6/sq mi)
- Time zone: UTC+01:00 (CET)
  - Summer (DST): UTC+02:00 (CEST)
- Postal codes: 23863
- Dialling codes: 04532
- Vehicle registration: OD
- Website: www.bargteheide- land.de

Bargfeld-Stegen is a municipality in the district of Stormarn, in Schleswig-Holstein, Germany.
