= Steinburg, Stormarn =

Steinburg
- Municipality
- Coat of arms

- Location of Steinburg within Stormarn district
- Interactive map of Steinburg
- Location within Germany Location within Schleswig-Holstein
- Coordinates: 53°42′41″N 10°24′10″E
- Country: Germany
- State: Schleswig-Holstein
- District: Stormarn
- Municipal assoc.: Bad Oldesloe-Land
- Subdivisions: 3

Government
  - Mayor: Heidi Hack

Area
  - Total: 23.91 km^{2} (9.23 sq mi)
- Elevation: 60 m (200 ft)

Population (2025-12-31)
  - Total: 2,734
  - Density: 114.3/km^{2} (296.2/sq mi)
- Time zone: UTC+01:00 (CET)
  - Summer (DST): UTC+02:00 (CEST)
- Postal codes: 22964
- Dialling codes: 04534
- Vehicle registration: OD
- Website: www.amt-bad- oldesloe-land.de

Steinburg is a municipality in the district of Stormarn, in Schleswig-Holstein, Germany.
