= Bargteheide-Land =

- Amt
- Map of Stormarn highlighting Bargteheide-Land
- Interactive map of Bargteheide-Land
- Location within Germany Location within Schleswig-Holstein
- Coordinates: 53°45′N 10°16′E
- Country: Germany
- State: Schleswig-Holstein
- District: Stormarn
- Seat: Bargteheide
- Subdivisions: 8 municipalities

Area
  - Total: 98.9 km^{2} (38.2 sq mi)

Population (2025-12-31)
  - Total: 14,661
  - Density: 148/km^{2} (384/sq mi)
- Time zone: UTC+01:00 (CET)
  - Summer (DST): UTC+02:00 (CEST)
- Website: www.bargteheide-land.de

Bargteheide-Land is an Amt ("collective municipality") in the district of Stormarn, in Schleswig-Holstein, Germany. It is situated around Bargteheide, which is the seat of the Amt, but not part of it.

The Amt Bargteheide-Land consists of the following municipalities:

1. Bargfeld-Stegen
2. Delingsdorf
3. Elmenhorst
4. Hammoor
5. Jersbek
6. Nienwohld
7. Todendorf
8. Tremsbüttel
