= Grabau, Stormarn =

Grabau
- Municipality
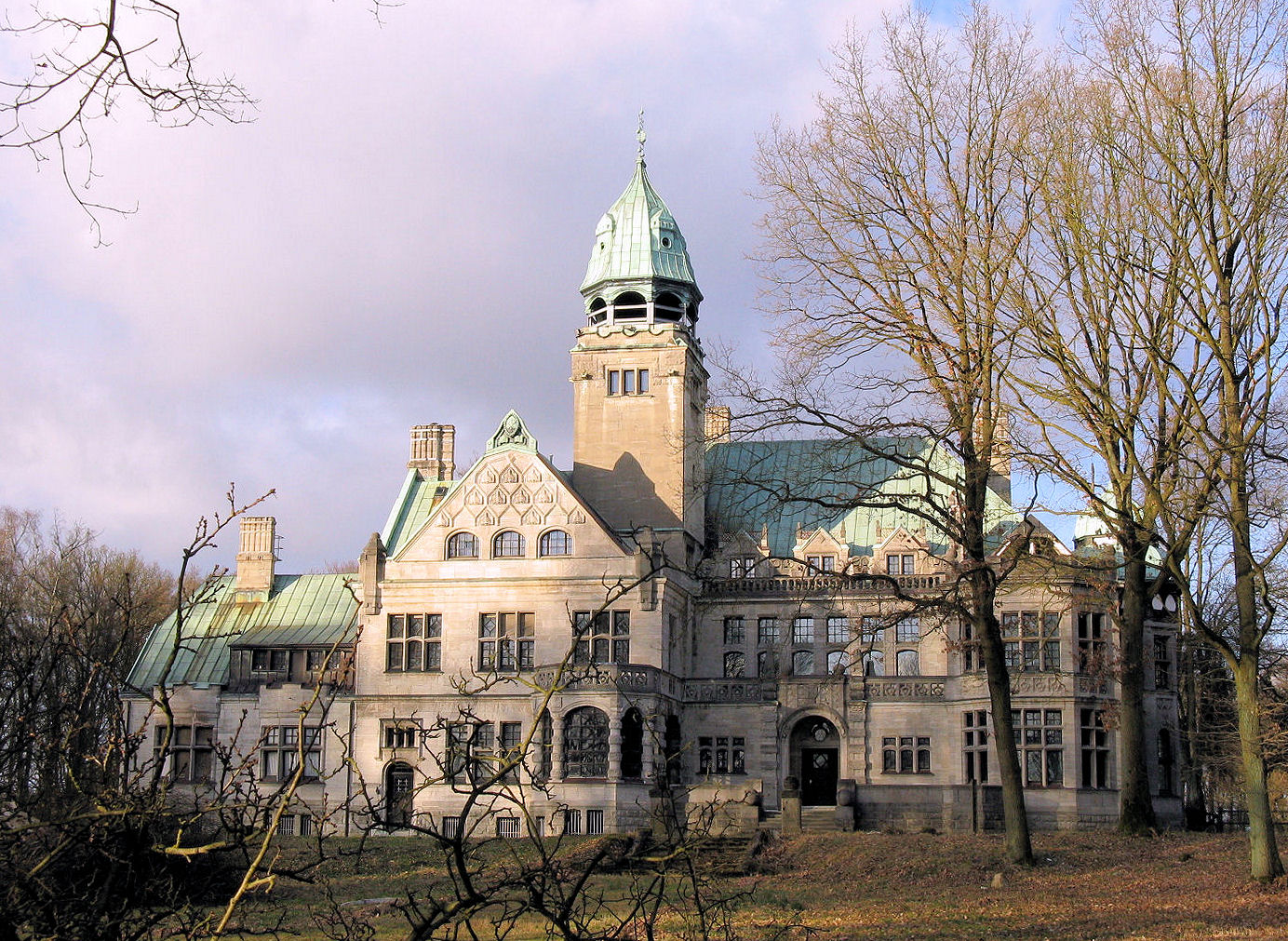
- Manor house in Grabau

- Coat of arms

- Location of Grabau within Stormarn district
- Interactive map of Grabau
- Location within Germany Location within Schleswig-Holstein
- Coordinates: 53°48′20″N 10°16′31″E
- Country: Germany
- State: Schleswig-Holstein
- District: Stormarn
- Municipal assoc.: Bad Oldesloe-Land

Government
  - Mayor: Hans-Joachim Wendt

Area
  - Total: 9.14 km^{2} (3.53 sq mi)
- Elevation: 31 m (102 ft)

Population (2025-12-31)
  - Total: 751
  - Density: 82.2/km^{2} (213/sq mi)
- Time zone: UTC+01:00 (CET)
  - Summer (DST): UTC+02:00 (CEST)
- Postal codes: 23845
- Dialling codes: 04537
- Vehicle registration: OD
- Website: www.amt-bad- oldesloe-land.de

Grabau (German pronunciation: [ˈɡʁaːbaʊ]) is a municipality in the district of Stormarn, in Schleswig-Holstein, Germany.
