= Nienwohld =

- Municipality
- Coat of arms

- Location of Nienwohld within Stormarn district
- Interactive map of Nienwohld
- Location within Germany Location within Schleswig-Holstein
- Coordinates: 53°47′13″N 10°11′40″E
- Country: Germany
- State: Schleswig-Holstein
- District: Stormarn
- Municipal assoc.: Bargteheide-Land

Government
  - Mayor: Doris Schulz

Area
  - Total: 9.19 km^{2} (3.55 sq mi)
- Elevation: 40 m (130 ft)

Population (2025-12-31)
  - Total: 493
  - Density: 53.6/km^{2} (139/sq mi)
- Time zone: UTC+01:00 (CET)
  - Summer (DST): UTC+02:00 (CEST)
- Postal codes: 23863
- Dialling codes: 04537
- Vehicle registration: OD
- Website: www.bargteheide-land.de

Nienwohld is a municipality in the district of Stormarn, in Schleswig-Holstein, Germany.
