= Badendorf =

- Municipality
- Coat of arms

- Location of Badendorf within Stormarn district
- Interactive map of Badendorf
- Location within Germany Location within Schleswig-Holstein
- Coordinates: 53°52′3″N 10°34′48″E
- Country: Germany
- State: Schleswig-Holstein
- District: Stormarn
- Municipal assoc.: Nordstormarn

Government
  - Mayor: Volker Brockmann

Area
  - Total: 6.11 km^{2} (2.36 sq mi)
- Elevation: 21 m (69 ft)

Population (2025-12-31)
  - Total: 935
  - Density: 153/km^{2} (396/sq mi)
- Time zone: UTC+01:00 (CET)
  - Summer (DST): UTC+02:00 (CEST)
- Postal codes: 23619
- Dialling codes: 0451
- Vehicle registration: OD
- Website: www.amt-nordstormarn.de

Badendorf is a municipality in the district of Stormarn, in Schleswig-Holstein, Germany.
