= Hammoor =

- Municipality
- Coat of arms

- Location of Hammoor within Stormarn district
- Interactive map of Hammoor
- Location within Germany Location within Schleswig-Holstein
- Coordinates: 53°42′56″N 10°19′26″E
- Country: Germany
- State: Schleswig-Holstein
- District: Stormarn
- Municipal assoc.: Bargteheide-Land

Government
  - Mayor: Helmut Drenkhahn

Area
  - Total: 7.82 km^{2} (3.02 sq mi)
- Elevation: 41 m (135 ft)

Population (2025-12-31)
  - Total: 1,348
  - Density: 172/km^{2} (446/sq mi)
- Time zone: UTC+01:00 (CET)
  - Summer (DST): UTC+02:00 (CEST)
- Postal codes: 22941
- Dialling codes: 04532
- Vehicle registration: OD
- Website: www.bargteheide- land.de

Hammoor is a municipality in the district of Stormarn, in Schleswig-Holstein, Germany.
