= Brunsbek =

- Municipality
- Coat of arms

- Location of Brunsbek within Stormarn district
- Interactive map of Brunsbek
- Location within Germany Location within Schleswig-Holstein
- Coordinates: 53°35′40″N 10°16′6″E
- Country: Germany
- State: Schleswig-Holstein
- District: Stormarn
- Municipal assoc.: Siek
- Subdivisions: 3

Government
  - Mayor: Olaf Beber

Area
  - Total: 16.06 km^{2} (6.20 sq mi)
- Elevation: 62 m (203 ft)

Population (2025-12-31)
  - Total: 1,826
  - Density: 113.7/km^{2} (294.5/sq mi)
- Time zone: UTC+01:00 (CET)
  - Summer (DST): UTC+02:00 (CEST)
- Postal codes: 22946
- Dialling codes: 04107
- Vehicle registration: OD
- Website: www.amtsiek.de

Brunsbek is a municipality in the district of Stormarn, in Schleswig-Holstein, Germany.
