= Ratzlaff =

Ratzlaff is a surname of German origin derived from the Slavic given name 1) Ratislav (from рать transliterated as rat for "battle" and слав transliterated as slav for "glory" or "praise") or 2) Radoslav (from рад transliterated as rad for "joyful" and слав transliterated as slav for "glory" or "praise"). The name may refer to:

- Leonard Ratzlaff (born 1949), Canadian musician
- Raymond Ratzlaff (1931–2019), Canadian politician

== See also ==
- Retzlaff
