= Rausdorf =

- Municipality
- Coat of arms

- Location of Rausdorf within Stormarn district
- Interactive map of Rausdorf
- Location within Germany Location within Schleswig-Holstein
- Coordinates: 53°35′22″N 10°19′45″E
- Country: Germany
- State: Schleswig-Holstein
- District: Stormarn
- Municipal assoc.: Trittau

Government
  - Mayor: Otto Kertelhein

Area
  - Total: 4.87 km^{2} (1.88 sq mi)
- Elevation: 29 m (95 ft)

Population (2025-12-31)
  - Total: 232
  - Density: 47.6/km^{2} (123/sq mi)
- Time zone: UTC+01:00 (CET)
  - Summer (DST): UTC+02:00 (CEST)
- Postal codes: 22929
- Dialling codes: 04154
- Vehicle registration: OD
- Website: www.amt-trittau.de

Rausdorf (German pronunciation: [ˈʁaʊsdɔʁf]) is a municipality in the district of Stormarn, in Schleswig-Holstein, Germany.
