= Rehhorst =

- Municipality
- Coat of arms

- Location of Rehhorst within Stormarn district
- Interactive map of Rehhorst
- Location within Germany Location within Schleswig-Holstein
- Coordinates: 53°52′34″N 10°28′13″E
- Country: Germany
- State: Schleswig-Holstein
- District: Stormarn
- Municipal assoc.: Nordstormarn

Government
  - Mayor: Friedrich-Wilhelm Löwe

Area
  - Total: 16.19 km^{2} (6.25 sq mi)
- Elevation: 62 m (203 ft)

Population (2025-12-31)
  - Total: 701
  - Density: 43.3/km^{2} (112/sq mi)
- Time zone: UTC+01:00 (CET)
  - Summer (DST): UTC+02:00 (CEST)
- Postal codes: 23619
- Dialling codes: 04533
- Vehicle registration: OD
- Website: www.amt- nordstormarn.de

Rehhorst is a municipality in the district of Stormarn, in Schleswig-Holstein, Germany.
