= Westerau =

- Municipality
- Coat of arms

- Location of Westerau within Stormarn district
- Interactive map of Westerau
- Location within Germany Location within Schleswig-Holstein
- Coordinates: 53°47′N 10°29′E
- Country: Germany
- State: Schleswig-Holstein
- District: Stormarn
- Municipal assoc.: Nordstormarn

Government
  - Mayor: Johanna Großer

Area
  - Total: 15.38 km^{2} (5.94 sq mi)
- Elevation: 13 m (43 ft)

Population (2025-12-31)
  - Total: 765
  - Density: 49.7/km^{2} (129/sq mi)
- Time zone: UTC+01:00 (CET)
  - Summer (DST): UTC+02:00 (CEST)
- Postal codes: 23847
- Dialling codes: 04539
- Vehicle registration: OD
- Website: www.amt-nordstormarn.de

Westerau is a municipality in the district of Stormarn, in Schleswig-Holstein, Germany.
