= Hamberge =

- Municipality
- Coat of arms

- Location of Hamberge within Stormarn district
- Interactive map of Hamberge
- Location within Germany Location within Schleswig-Holstein
- Coordinates: 53°50′N 10°34′E
- Country: Germany
- State: Schleswig-Holstein
- District: Stormarn
- Municipal assoc.: Nordstormarn

Government
  - Mayor: Paul Friedrich Beeck (CDU)

Area
  - Total: 6.74 km^{2} (2.60 sq mi)
- Elevation: 13 m (43 ft)

Population (2025-12-31)
  - Total: 1,834
  - Density: 272/km^{2} (705/sq mi)
- Time zone: UTC+01:00 (CET)
  - Summer (DST): UTC+02:00 (CEST)
- Postal codes: 23619
- Dialling codes: 0451
- Vehicle registration: OD
- Website: www.amt- nordstormarn.de

Hamberge (German pronunciation: [hamˈbɛʁɡə]; Low German: Hambarg) is a municipality in the district of Stormarn, in Schleswig-Holstein, Germany.
