= Heidekamp =

- Municipality
- Coat of arms

- Location of Heidekamp within Stormarn district
- Interactive map of Heidekamp
- Location within Germany Location within Schleswig-Holstein
- Coordinates: 53°51′15″N 10°30′4″E
- Country: Germany
- State: Schleswig-Holstein
- District: Stormarn
- Municipal assoc.: Nordstormarn

Government
  - Mayor: Horst Mosler

Area
  - Total: 3.49 km^{2} (1.35 sq mi)
- Elevation: 21 m (69 ft)

Population (2025-12-31)
  - Total: 523
  - Density: 150/km^{2} (388/sq mi)
- Time zone: UTC+01:00 (CET)
  - Summer (DST): UTC+02:00 (CEST)
- Postal codes: 23858
- Dialling codes: 04506, 04533, 04534
- Vehicle registration: OD
- Website: www.amt- nordstormarn.de

Heidekamp is a municipality in the district of Stormarn, in Schleswig-Holstein, Germany.
