= Hamfelde, Stormarn =

Hamfelde
- Municipality
- Coat of arms

- Location of Hamfelde within Stormarn district
- Interactive map of Hamfelde
- Location within Germany Location within Schleswig-Holstein
- Coordinates: 53°36′12″N 10°27′14″E
- Country: Germany
- State: Schleswig-Holstein
- District: Stormarn
- Municipal assoc.: Trittau

Government
  - Mayor: Thomas Eggers

Area
  - Total: 2.72 km^{2} (1.05 sq mi)
- Elevation: 36 m (118 ft)

Population (2025-12-31)
  - Total: 512
  - Density: 188/km^{2} (488/sq mi)
- Time zone: UTC+01:00 (CET)
  - Summer (DST): UTC+02:00 (CEST)
- Postal codes: 22929
- Dialling codes: 04154
- Vehicle registration: OD
- Website: www.amt-trittau.de

Hamfelde (German pronunciation: [hamˈfɛldə]; Low German: Hamfellen) is a municipality in the district of Stormarn, in Schleswig-Holstein, Germany.
