= Barnitz, Germany =

Barnitz
- Municipality
- Coat of arms

- Location of Barnitz within Stormarn district
- Interactive map of Barnitz
- Location within Germany Location within Schleswig-Holstein
- Coordinates: 53°48′43″N 10°28′57″E
- Country: Germany
- State: Schleswig-Holstein
- District: Stormarn
- Municipal assoc.: Nordstormarn
- Subdivisions: 4

Government
  - Mayor: Hans-Joachim Schütt

Area
  - Total: 11.80 km^{2} (4.56 sq mi)
- Elevation: 29 m (95 ft)

Population (2025-12-31)
  - Total: 853
  - Density: 72.3/km^{2} (187/sq mi)
- Time zone: UTC+01:00 (CET)
  - Summer (DST): UTC+02:00 (CEST)
- Postal codes: 23858
- Dialling codes: 04533
- Vehicle registration: OD
- Website: www.amt-nordstormarn.de

Barnitz is a municipality in the district of Stormarn, in Schleswig-Holstein, Germany.
