= Paschen von Cossel =

Paschen Ritter und Edler von Cossel
- Arms of the von Cossel family. Blazon: Per fess Sable and Argent a sword bendwise Gules the blade uppermost enfiled with a coronet Or, impaling Argent an eagle displayed Sable armed Or; on a plain point Azure a lion's fleece also Or suspended by a chain of three links Gules from an inescutcheon overall tierced in pale Argent, Sable and Gules.
- Predecessor: New creation
- Successor: None
- Born: December 21, 1714; Anklam, Vorpommern
- Died: 17 January 1805 (aged 90); Jersbek
- Spouse: Christine Eleonore Seip; Maria Elisabeth Matthießen
- Father: Henning Detloff Kossel
- Mother: Catharina Dorothea Pritzbuer
- Occupation: Lawyer, syndic, canon

Paschen Ritter und Edler von Cossel (21 December 1714 in Anklam, Vorpommern – 17 January 1805 in Jersbek), was a German lawyer (since 1738), doctor of laws, syndic, canon of the Hamburg Cathedral chapter, and owner of two Holsteinian estates, Gut Jersbek and Gut Stegen (from 1774–1805). He led a successful public life, and, in 1769, became Konferenzrat to the Danish royal household. Cossel and his second wife are buried in the forest adjacent to the park on the Jersbek estate.

== Biography ==
=== Birth, family, and education ===
Paschen von Cossel was born to Henning Detloff Kossel (2 March 1670 – 6 July 1741) and Catharina Dorothea Pritzbuer (26 February 1683 – 17 November 1741), the last of eight children. His father had been a merchant, vintner, cellarer, and innkeeper in Anklam, Wismar, Neubrandenburg, and Stralsund, since 1700.

Cossel spent his school days in the Gymnasium Stralsund (part of the Katharinenkloster), where he received a thorough education (learning, for instance, Greek, Latin, and Hebrew), gaining his school certificate in 1731. He received his Licentium Juris at the University of Rostock (1731) the Ernst-Moritz-Arndt-Universität Greifswald (1734), and the Martin-Luther-Universität Halle-Wittenberg (1736), where he wrote a doctoral dissertation.

=== Two childless marriages ===
On the 15 May 1748 in Pyrmont, Paschen von Cossel married Christine Eleonore Seip (14 January 1728 – 23 July 1748), daughter of Dr Johann Philipp Seip, the royal physician. Following her untimely death shortly after the marriage, Cossel married Maria Elisabeth Matthießen (28 January 1718 – 5 April 1789) on the 12 August 1755. Neither marriage yielded any progeny.

=== Death ===
Over ninety years old, Paschen von Cossel died in his Jersbek residence around 1pm on the 17 January 1805. The burial took place on the 23 January in the early hours of the morning, in the presence of friends and family; he is buried next to his second wife in the park of the Jersbek estate. This burial was altogether unconventional: there were no tolling bells, the burial place was not a consecrated graveyard, and there was neither pastor, nor blessing. It is not known why Cossel made these burial wishes. There are three factors which may have contributed to this decision, all based in the zeitgeist of the latter half of the eighteenth century: a desire to look back to the customs of antiquity, whereby one would be buried extra muros, i.e. in open space; the Enlightenment idea that it was unhygienic to bury the dead in and around churches; and simply a love of nature. Another possible reason for this unusual burial is that Cossel had feuded with Pastor Hans Christian Andresen, of Sülfeld.

== Honours ==
Both of Cossel's brothers went to Hamburg to establish trade businesses. Paschen followed them there in 1738, but became a lawyer. Through his excellent legal knowledge, juristic acumen, practical skill, and oratorical talent, he quickly developed a large and notable chancellery. On the 3 July 1741, Elector Frederick Augustus II of Saxony, in his role as imperial vicar for Saxony, granted Cossel the privilege of a count palatinate.

On the 16 April 1750, Cossel was elected successor to the Very Reverend Nicolai Albert von Holtze, of the syndic of the Hamburg Cathedral chapter. He held this office until 1760. Also, from the 15 December 1755 to the 9 April 1791, he was co-manager of the diocese (Canonicus minor).

He became the Mecklenburg-Schweriner Wirklicher Justizrat (4 November 1752), the Etatsrat to the royal Russian and Holsteinian households (23 July 1760), and the Konferenzrat to the royal Danish household (8 November 1769).

Paschen von Cossel's long-time friend, Christian Stilck, presented him with letters patent and a grant of arms, and was raised into the untitled ranks of nobility on 21 December 1742. After he visited the imperial court in Vienna and asked for a raise in noble rank, he was granted the hereditary style of "Ritter und Edler von Cossel" (The Knight and The Noble of Cossel) on the 2 June 1755.

== See also ==
- Hans-Detloff von Cossel

== Literature ==
- Davids, Curt, Chronik des alten Gutsbezirks Jersbek-Stegen, Hamburg 1954.
- Davids, Curt, Paschen von Cossel als holsteinischer Gutsherr, in: Jahrbuch des Alstervereins
- Deutsche Biographie, Neudruck der 1. Auflage von 1876, Vierter Band, Berlin 1968, 381 f. (Stichwort: Cossel).
- Deutsche Biographische Enzyklopädie (DBE), München 1995, Band 2, 381 f. (Stichwort: Cossel).
- Deutsches Geschlechterbuch – Genealogisches Handbuch bürgerlicher Familien, hrsg. von Bernhard Koerner, Band 57, Görlitz 1928, 293 ff. (Geschlecht: von Cossel).
- Ettrich, Hannelies, Chronik Jersbek, Husum 1989.
- Günther, Barbara (Hrsg.), Stormarn Lexikon, Neumünster 2003 (Stichwort: von Cossel)..
- Heitmann, Hermann, Die Güter Jersbek und Stegen, Jersbek 1954 (vervielf. Ms.).
- Kopitzsch, Franklin/Brietzke, Dirk (Hrsg.), Hamburgische Biografie, Personenlexikon, Band 4, Göttingen 2006 (Stichwort: von Cossel).
- Lohmeier, Dieter, Cossel, in: Biographisches Lexikon für Schleswig-Holstein und Lübeck, Band 11, Neumünster 2000, 85-88.
- Lohr, Axel, Paschen von Cossel und sein Wirken in Jersbek, in: Jahrbuch für den Kreis Stormarn 2004, Ahrensburg 2003, 98-127, mit Fortsetzung im Jahrbuch 2005, Ahrensburg 2004, 23-56.
- Lohr, Axel, Materialsammlung zu Paschen von Cossel und sein Wirken in Jersbek. Eigendruck 2003, im Archiv des Kreises Stormarn.
- Lohr, Axel, Die Geschichte des Gutes Jersbek von 1588 bis zur Gegenwart, Diss. phil. Hamburg 2007, Stormarner Hefte Nr. 24, Neumünster 2007.
- Lohr, Axel, Streit zwischen Paschen von Cossel und dem Sülfelder Pastor Hans Christian Andresen über zu Unrecht erhobene Deprecationsgebühren, in: Jahrbuch für den Kreis Stormarn 2009, Ahrensburg 2008.
- Neuer Nekrolog der Deutschen, Zehnter Jahrgang 1832, Ilmenau 1834, 471–472 (Stichwort: Eberhard Christopher von Cossel).
- Paatsch, Walter, Ein Prozeß Pasch Cossels beim Reichskammergericht, in: Jahrbuch des Alstervereins e.V., Norderstedt 1992, 40-50.
- Schröder, Hans, Lexikon der hamburgischen Schriftsteller bis zur Gegenwart, 8 Bände, 1. Band, Hamburg 1851, 586 (Stichwort: Cossel).
- Schröder, Klaus, Geheimnisvolle Steine im Jersbeker Wald – Die Sanierung der Grabanlage von Cossel, in: Stormarner Hefte 20/1997, Neumünster 1997, 121-129.
- Wulf, Martin, Paschen Edler von Cossel, Gutsherr auf Jersbek und Stegen, in: Jahrbuch des Alstervereins e.V. 1965, Hamburg o. J., 27-35.
