= Giramondo Publishing =

Australian literary small press

Giramondo Publishing Company
- Status: Active
- Founded: 1995
- Country of origin: Australia
- Headquarters location: Sydney
- Key people: Ivor Indyk (founder and publisher), Evelyn Juers (founder and publisher)
- Publication types: Books and magazines
- Official website: https://giramondopublishing.com

Giramondo Publishing (Giramondo Publishing Company) is an independent Australian literary small press founded in 1995. It is a publisher of poetry, fiction and non-fiction by Australian and overseas writers, and works in translation from Chinese, German, Spanish, French and Hindi. It also published HEAT magazine in two series from 1996 to 2012.

Giramondo is supported by the Australia Council and Arts NSW. Its works are distributed by NewSouth.

== History ==
Giramondo was founded by Ivor Indyk and Evelyn Juers, who have worked as its publishers up until the present day. The company's initial publishing output was in the literary journal HEAT, which gave space to emerging and established authors both from Australia and overseas, often in translation. In 2001, Giramondo moved with Indyk to the University of Newcastle. In 2005, it moved again to join the Writing and Society Research Group at Western Sydney University's Bankstown campus. It relocated its offices to the university's campus in Parramatta, where it is currently based.

Giramondo began its publication of poetry and fiction in 2002. The imprint has published titles by authors including Alexis Wright, Brian Castro, Judith Beveridge, Jennifer Maiden, Alan Wearne and Gerald Murnane. In recent years it has presided over the development of a literature based in Western Sydney, through the publication of books by Fiona Wright, Felicity Castagna, Luke Carman and Michael Mohammed Ahmad.

In 2017, Giramondo launched its Southern Latitudes series with All My Goodbyes, a novel by Argentine author Mariana Dimópulos. The series aims to "bring together writers from the southern hemisphere, and to allow their work to strike resonances for Australian writers and readers." Giramondo also produces a series of short-form books of limited print run, which carry the tongue-in-cheek quote from Les Murray's poem "The Dream of Wearing Shorts Forever": "It is time perhaps to cherish the culture of shorts."

== Cover design ==
Since the company's inception, all of Giramondo's covers have been designed by Australian designer Harry Williamson, including covers of HEAT. Poetry books all have a white spine; a fixed typographical layout; and three, thin-weighted black lines on the book's front, each of which underscores the letters of the title, the author and the publisher. Williamson was inducted into the Design Institute of Australia Hall of Fame in 2013 and the Australian Publishers' Association Book Design Awards Hall of Fame in 2002.
