= Bad Oldesloe-Land =

Collective municipality in Schleswig-Holstein, Germany

- Amt
- Coat of arms

- Map of Stormarn highlighting Bad Oldesloe-Land
- Interactive map of Bad Oldesloe-Land
- Location within Germany Location within Schleswig-Holstein
- Coordinates: 53°48′42″N 10°22′27″E
- Country: Germany
- State: Schleswig-Holstein
- District: Stormarn
- Seat: Bad Oldesloe
- Subdivisions: 9 municipalities

Area
  - Total: 121.76 km^{2} (47.01 sq mi)

Population (2025-12-31)
  - Total: 11,533
  - Density: 94.719/km^{2} (245.32/sq mi)
- Time zone: UTC+01:00 (CET)
  - Summer (DST): UTC+02:00 (CEST)
- Website: www.amt-bad-oldesloe-land.de

Bad Oldesloe-Land is an Amt ("collective municipality") in the district of Stormarn, in Schleswig-Holstein, Germany. It is situated around Bad Oldesloe, which is the seat of the Amt, but not part of it.

The Amt Bad Oldesloe-Land consists of the following municipalities:

1. Grabau
2. Lasbek
3. Meddewade
4. Neritz
5. Pölitz
6. Rethwisch
7. Rümpel
8. Steinburg
9. Travenbrück

== Coat of arms ==
The blazon of this Amt is "a silver wavy gules in green background, with three golden ears of corn in each of the three angles, arranged 2:1, 2:1 and 1:2".
