= Feldhorst =

- Municipality
- Coat of arms

- Location of Feldhorst within Stormarn district
- Interactive map of Feldhorst
- Location within Germany Location within Schleswig-Holstein
- Coordinates: 53°51′11″N 10°25′5″E
- Country: Germany
- State: Schleswig-Holstein
- District: Stormarn
- Municipal assoc.: Nordstormarn
- Subdivisions: 2

Government
  - Mayor: Ernst-Wilhelm Schorr

Area
  - Total: 15.48 km^{2} (5.98 sq mi)
- Elevation: 45 m (148 ft)

Population (2025-12-31)
  - Total: 550
  - Density: 36/km^{2} (92/sq mi)
- Time zone: UTC+01:00 (CET)
  - Summer (DST): UTC+02:00 (CEST)
- Postal codes: 23858
- Dialling codes: 04533
- Vehicle registration: OD
- Website: www.amt-nordstormarn.de

Feldhorst is a municipality in the district of Stormarn, in Schleswig-Holstein, Germany.
