= Elmenhorst, Stormarn =

Elmenhorst
- Municipality
- Coat of arms

- Location of Elmenhorst within Stormarn district
- Interactive map of Elmenhorst
- Location within Germany Location within Schleswig-Holstein
- Coordinates: 53°46′N 10°16′E
- Country: Germany
- State: Schleswig-Holstein
- District: Stormarn
- Municipal assoc.: Bargteheide-Land

Government
  - Mayor: Uwe Prescher

Area
  - Total: 14.93 km^{2} (5.76 sq mi)
- Elevation: 30 m (98 ft)

Population (2025-12-31)
  - Total: 2,821
  - Density: 188.9/km^{2} (489.4/sq mi)
- Time zone: UTC+01:00 (CET)
  - Summer (DST): UTC+02:00 (CEST)
- Postal codes: 23869
- Dialling codes: 04532
- Vehicle registration: OD
- Website: www.bargteheide- land.de

Elmenhorst (German pronunciation: [ˈɛlmənhɔʁst]) is a municipality in the district of Stormarn, in Schleswig-Holstein, Germany.
