= Erich Retzlaff =

German photographer (1899–1993)

Erich Retzlaff (born Reinfeld, Germany 1899, died Dießen am Ammersee, Bavaria, Germany, 1993) was a German photographer who focused primarily on portraits of workers, farmers, peasants and peasant costumes.

== Early career ==
Retzlaff served as a machine gunner in the First World War, seeing action and being wounded on the Western Front, Flanders. During the war he received the Iron Cross (second class). After a series of false starts in civilian life after the war, Retzlaff became involved with photography in the mid to late 1920s starting with a small studio on the Königsallee (Düsseldorf) and then moving to larger premises as his business grew.

Between 1928 and 1929 Retzlaff worked on a project that would become his first book Das Antlitz Des Alters [The Face of Age] (1930). The Quarterly Review of Biology commented in 1931:

The viewpoint and the purpose of this beautiful volume are literary and artistic rather than scientific. The superb portraits of some 35 old men and women will, however, be of interest and use to students of human senescence, senility, and longevity."

The book cemented a reputation for Retzlaff as an ‘art’ photographer and in a short space of time he went on to produce two further book projects composed primarily of portraits of Germans at work both on the land and in industry; Die von der Scholle [those who till the soil] (1931) and Menschen am Werk [people at work] (1931). When the National Socialists were elected to power in Germany in 1933, Retzlaff was already considered something of a pioneer in his photographic output with regards depictions of the German peasant and proletariat. A reviewer of Retzlaff’s book Die von der Scholle, writing for the University of Oklahoma’s Books Abroad, observed in 1932:

The art-photographer Erich Retzlaff has assembled two volumes of large full-page photographs which are grippingly real and at the same time strikingly unusual…They are wholesome average members of the laboring classes…presented in their everyday appearance…these collections are both striking and edifying.

Impressed by these earlier photographic studies of German ‘Volkdom’, and to coincide with the year of their coming to power, the National Socialists employed Retzlaff to produce portraits of party notables such as Rudolf Hess, Gregor Strasser, Joseph Goebbels and Ernst Röhm; to be published in a special edition Wegbereiter und Vorkämpfer für das neue Deutschland [pioneers and champions of the new Germany] (1933).

== Agfacolor-Neu ==
During the 1930s Retzlaff’s profile as a photographer continued to grow and was further enhanced by his use of the new colour photographic materials that were introduced by Agfa in 1936. In addition to his acclaimed repertoire of black and white studies of workers and peasants, Retzlaff was one of the first German photographers to use ‘Agfacolor-Neu’. The American ‘Kodachrome’ process had arrived in 1935 but involved a complex lab-based processing system. ‘Agfacolor-Neu’ enabled the photographer to self-process their colour films. Along with contemporaries such as Herbert Voß, Elisabeth Hase, Emil Grimm and Herbert Beyer, Retzlaff’s work was reproduced in a special edition, Agfacolor, das farbige Lichtbild [Agfacolor, the colour image] (1938).

Subsequent books corroborate Retzlaff’s enchantment with the new colour process and his continuing fascination with the image of the peasant. Images from Niederdeutschland - Landschaft und Volkstum [lower Germany - landscape and 'folkdom'] (1940) are produced with this firmly in mind. In the introduction to this book, Retzlaff states that the images are to show the beauty of the ‘Heimat’ and its integral link with its people and is not intended as an instruction book of colour techniques. He states:

Without doubt, colour photography is a tremendous asset to the scientist, especially for the 'Heimat' researcher, but also for the ‘Heimat friend’, for through faithful colour reproduction they have a unique educational material to hand…To make visible this harmony between the native people and their homeland, between landscape and ‘Volkstum’, is the intention of this book...

== Post-1945 ==
Although Retzlaff continued to make his living as a photographer after 1945, in a general sense, the photographs are less dynamic than the work made in the 1920s, 30s and 40s; the subjects do not have the drama of the earlier work. The absence of ideology seemed to undermine the sense of purpose that his earlier photography had possessed.

Retzlaff died at Dießen am Ammerse, Bavaria, Germany, in 1993. Over the span of his career Retzlaff's entire oeuvre was broad but the outstanding contribution that he made to German photography was his document of people at work, portraits of peasants in traditional costume and, more generally, a depiction of the peasantry of central and Eastern Europe.

A large collection of Erich Retzlaff's work is held in Munich at the Münchner Stadtmuseum. Since 2010 Dr. Christopher Webster van Tonder (Aberystwyth University) has conducted research into Retzlaff's work and his place in the history of photography and has published a book Erich Retzlaff: volksfotograf (2013) (ISBN 978-1-899095-32-2) with a touring exhibition Erich Retzlaff: volksfotograf, Monday 14 October 2013 – Friday 15 November 2013 (Aberystwyth University, School of Art Gallery & Museum), Tuesday 21 January–Friday 21 March 2014 (German Historical Institute, Bloomsbury, London [GHIL]).

A collection is held in the Aberystwyth University's School of Art Gallery & Museum. With support funding from the V&A Purchase Grant Fund and the ArtFund, Webster van Tonder acquired 30 vintage Retzlaff prints for the collection in 2012. In 2013 the Bettina Retzlaff-Cumming bequest brought a further 38 vintage Retzlaff prints to the collection. In 2014 the Anna-Claudia Guimbous bequest added over 250 vintage Retzlaff prints to the collection. The School of Art Gallery & Museum now holds the largest collection of Erich Retzlaff's work outside of Germany.
