= Hoisdorf =

- Municipality
- Coat of arms

- Location of Hoisdorf within Stormarn district
- Interactive map of Hoisdorf
- Location within Germany Location within Schleswig-Holstein
- Coordinates: 53°39′12″N 10°19′43″E
- Country: Germany
- State: Schleswig-Holstein
- District: Stormarn
- Municipal assoc.: Siek

Government
  - Mayor: Dieter Schippmann

Area
  - Total: 35.71 km^{2} (13.79 sq mi)
- Elevation: 58 m (190 ft)

Population (2025-12-31)
  - Total: 3,477
  - Density: 97.37/km^{2} (252.2/sq mi)
- Time zone: UTC+01:00 (CET)
  - Summer (DST): UTC+02:00 (CEST)
- Postal codes: 22955
- Dialling codes: 04107
- Vehicle registration: OD
- Website: www.amtsiek.de

Hoisdorf is a municipality in the district of Stormarn, in Schleswig-Holstein, Germany.
