= Retzlaff Farmstead =

- U.S. National Register of Historic Places
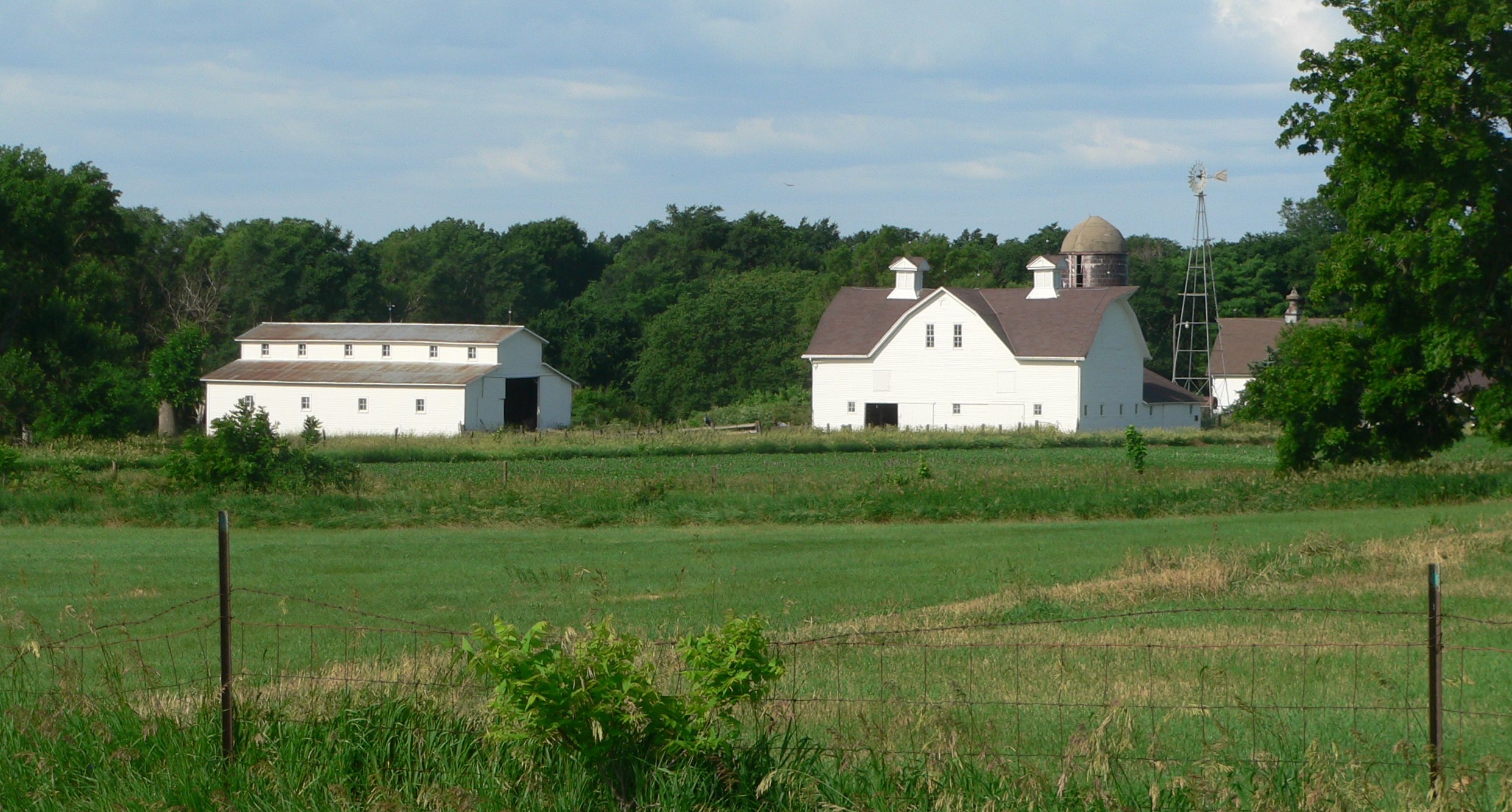
- The estate in 2013
- Nearest city: Walton, Nebraska
- Area: 160 acres (65 ha)
- Built by: Charles Retzlaff
- NRHP reference No.: 79001450
- Added to NRHP: May 31, 1979

The Retzlaff Farmstead is a historic estate in Walton, Nebraska. The farm was established in 1858 by Charles Retzlaff, an immigrant from Germany who had arrived in America four years earlier. Retzlaff raised purebred Shorthorn cattle on the farm, and he "became one of the county's most prominent citizens." By the late 1970s, the property belonged to the fourth generation of the same family. It has been listed on the National Register of Historic Places since May 31, 1979.
