= Reinfeld Abbey =

Monastery and castle in Schleswig-Holstein

Coordinates: 53°50′N 10°29′E

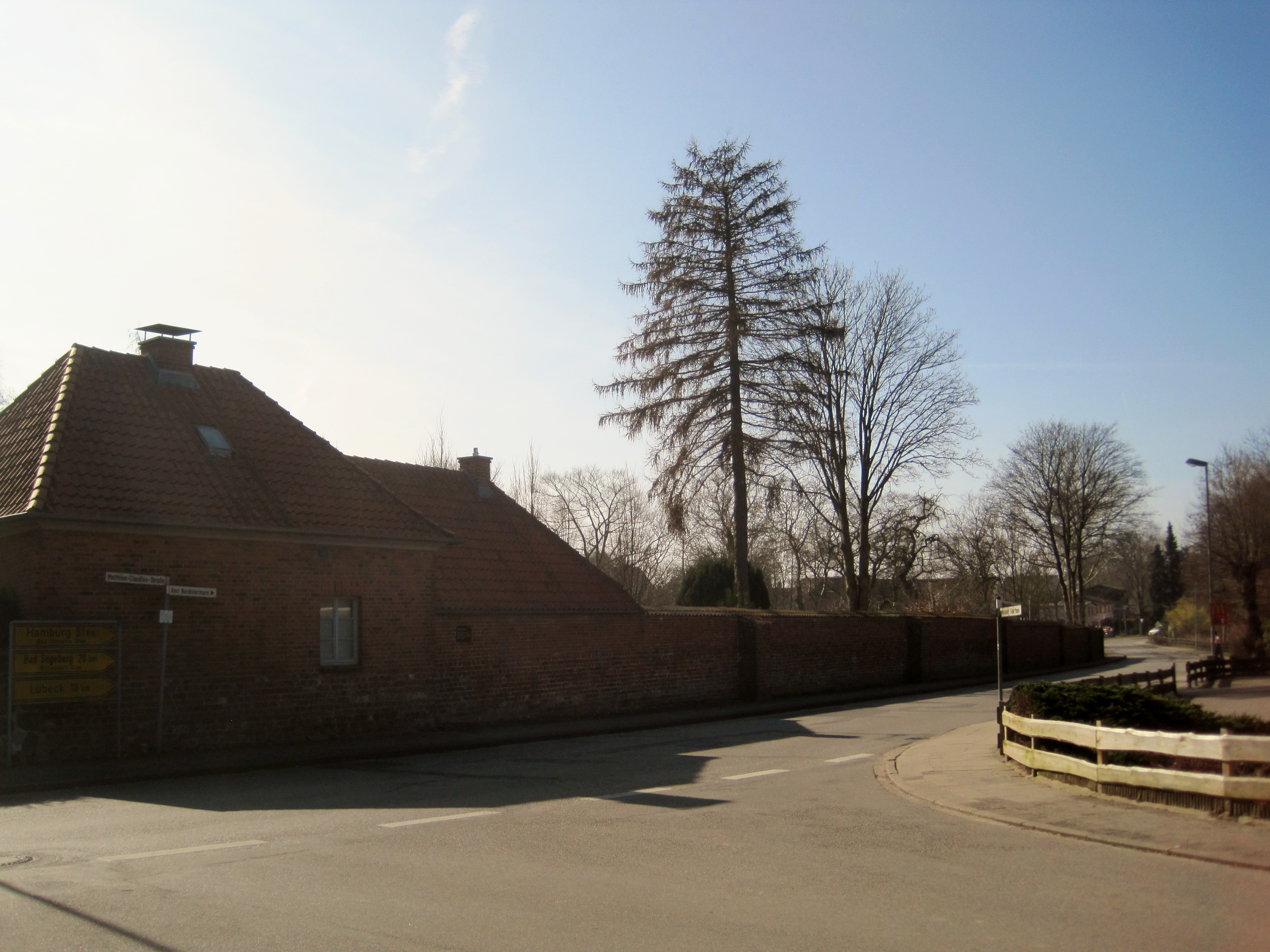
Reinfeld Abbey

Reinfeld Abbey (German: Kloster Reinfeld) was a Cistercian monastery in Reinfeld near Bad Oldesloe in Schleswig-Holstein in northern Germany.

== History ==
The monastery was founded in 1186 by monks from the Cistercian abbey of Loccum on a site given to them by Adolf III, Count of Schauenburg and Holstein. The Cistercians particularly sought wild and desolate sites for their monastic houses, and the site at Reinfeld, then consisting of marshy depressions along the valley of the Heilsau, met this requirement exactly: the foundation charter refers to it as a locus horroris ("place of horror").

The first community consisted of an abbot, Hartmann, and 12 monks. During their clearance and draining of the swampy ground, the monks dug out a large number of ponds, later used for fish (especially carp), some of which remain to this day. The monastery, once established, became prosperous, and acquired many estates. The community built up a close relationship with the city of Lübeck, and the abbot was permitted his own gate in the city walls.

With the approach of the Reformation, however, the relationship collapsed: the citizens of Lübeck stormed and burnt the abbey in 1534, and although it was re-built, in 1582 it was dissolved, and its assets taken over by the King of Denmark. The buildings were demolished.

The site was later used for the construction of a castle, which was itself demolished in 1775, and the stone quarried for other buildings. Little now remains on the site, apart from the fishponds and the precinct wall.
