= Zarpen =

- Municipality
- Coat of arms

- Location of Zarpen within Stormarn district
- Interactive map of Zarpen
- Location within Germany Location within Schleswig-Holstein
- Coordinates: 53°52′14″N 10°31′5″E
- Country: Germany
- State: Schleswig-Holstein
- District: Stormarn
- Municipal assoc.: Nordstormarn

Government
  - Mayor: Wolf-Friedrich Schöning

Area
  - Total: 11.69 km^{2} (4.51 sq mi)
- Elevation: 19 m (62 ft)

Population (2025-12-31)
  - Total: 1,434
  - Density: 122.7/km^{2} (317.7/sq mi)
- Time zone: UTC+01:00 (CET)
  - Summer (DST): UTC+02:00 (CEST)
- Postal codes: 23619
- Dialling codes: 04533
- Vehicle registration: OD
- Website: www.amt-nordstormarn.de

Zarpen is a municipality in the district of Stormarn, in Schleswig-Holstein, Germany.

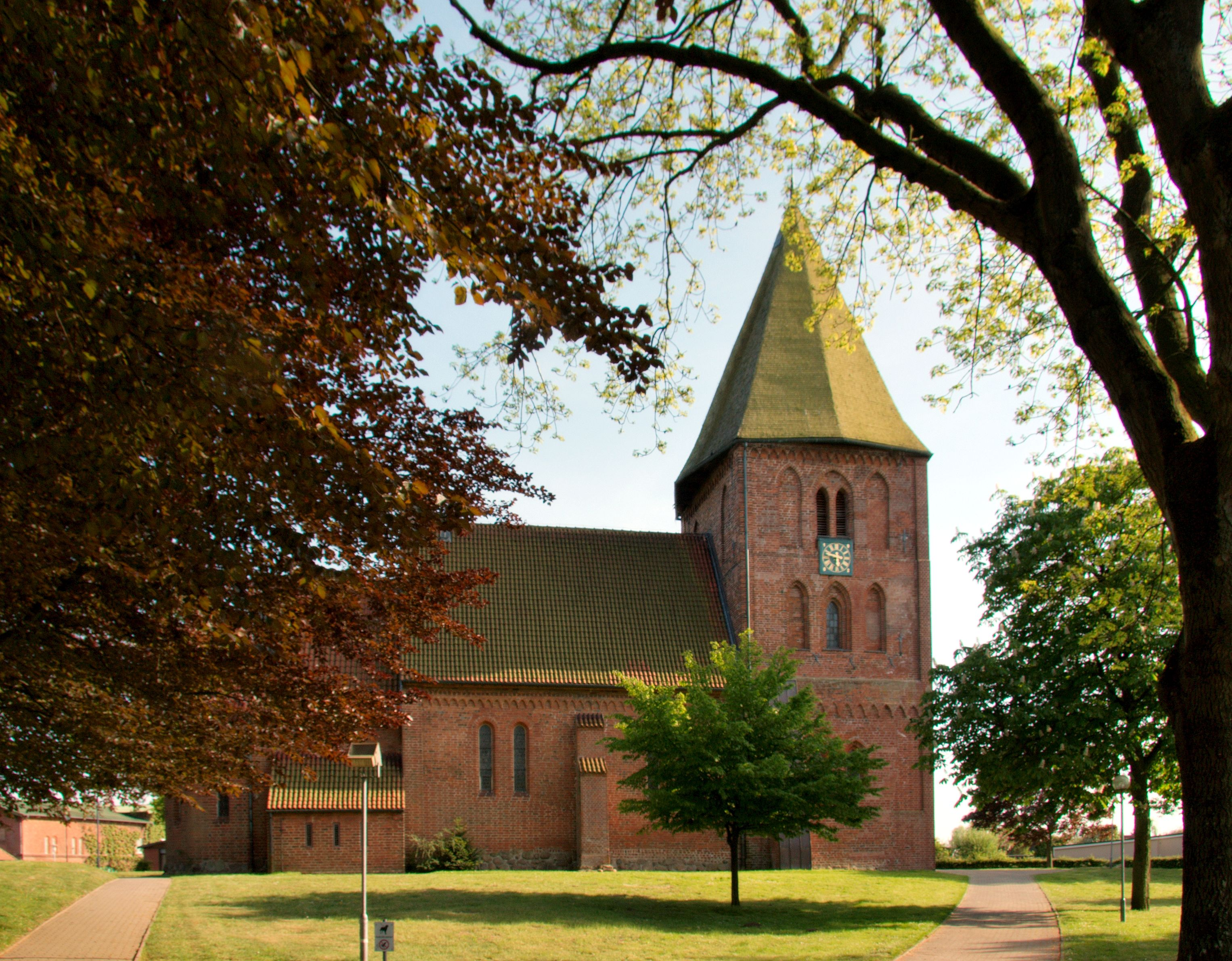
Protestant church Zarpen
