= Köthel, Stormarn =

Köthel
- Municipality
- Coat of arms

- Location of Köthel within Stormarn district
- Interactive map of Köthel
- Location within Germany Location within Schleswig-Holstein
- Coordinates: 53°36′45″N 10°30′30″E
- Country: Germany
- State: Schleswig-Holstein
- District: Stormarn
- Municipal assoc.: Trittau

Government
  - Mayor: Frank Siemers

Area
  - Total: 3.85 km^{2} (1.49 sq mi)
- Elevation: 38 m (125 ft)

Population (2025-12-31)
  - Total: 324
  - Density: 84.2/km^{2} (218/sq mi)
- Time zone: UTC+01:00 (CET)
  - Summer (DST): UTC+02:00 (CEST)
- Postal codes: 22929
- Dialling codes: 04159
- Vehicle registration: OD
- Website: koethel.de

Köthel (German pronunciation: [ˈkøːtl̩]; Low German: Keuthel) is a municipality in the district of Stormarn, in Schleswig-Holstein, Germany.
