= Hohenfelde, Stormarn =

Hohenfelde
- Municipality
- Coat of arms

- Location of Hohenfelde within Stormarn district
- Interactive map of Hohenfelde
- Location within Germany Location within Schleswig-Holstein
- Coordinates: 53°37′48″N 10°28′24″E
- Country: Germany
- State: Schleswig-Holstein
- District: Stormarn
- Municipal assoc.: Trittau

Government
  - Mayor: Heinrich Stahmer

Area
  - Total: 1.63 km^{2} (0.63 sq mi)
- Elevation: 52 m (171 ft)

Population (2025-12-31)
  - Total: 50
  - Density: 31/km^{2} (79/sq mi)
- Time zone: UTC+01:00 (CET)
  - Summer (DST): UTC+02:00 (CEST)
- Postal codes: 22946
- Dialling codes: 04154
- Vehicle registration: OD
- Website: www.trittau.de

Hohenfelde (German pronunciation: [hoːənˈfɛldə]) is a municipality in the district of Stormarn, in Schleswig-Holstein, Germany.
