= Lorenzo Grabau =

Italian businessman (born 1965)

- Born: 1965 (age 60–61); Rome, Italy
- Education: Universita degli Studi di Roma, La Sapienza,
- Alma mater: Economics
- Occupation: Chief Executive Officer
- Years active: 1980–present
- Employer(s): Merrill Lynch (1990-1994); Goldman Sachs (1994-2011); Investment AB Kinnevik (2011-present)
- Spouse: Sabrina Bodmer
- Children: Two

Lorenzo Grabau is an Italian businessman and he was recently chief executive officer of Swedish investment firm Investment AB Kinnevik until December 7, 2016. Prior to this, Grabau had an extensive career in investment banking, with 17 years spent at Goldman Sachs.

== Career ==
After graduating from Universita degli Studi di Roma, La Sapienza, in Italy, Grabau joined the investment bank Merrill Lynch in 1990 as an analyst. He remained here for five years working in the mergers and acquisition department in London and New York City. In 1994, he joined the investment banking division of Goldman Sachs, where he remained until 2011. During his time here, he held various leadership positions, eventually rising to managing director in 1999, responsible for driving growth within the consumer/retail and media/online industry practices, as well as the firm’s financial sponsors group.

Grabau’s Kinnevik career started in 2011 after he was appointed as the non-executive director of Modern Times Group. At this time, he was also appointed as a non-executive director of SoftKinetic, a Belgian IT software provider. In May 2013, he was appointed as a non-executive director at Millicom, while the following month, he was offered the role of co-chairman of CTC Media, which he accepted.

In May 2014, he assumed his current role as CEO of Investment AB Kinnevik, as well as a directorship at Tele2. Through Kinnevik, he is a board member of various Kinnevik-owned companies, including telecoms giants Millicom and Tele2, media firm Modern Times Group, e-commerce company Rocket Internet, as well as advisory firm SecureValue and online music retailer CDON. He is also the deputy chairman of the board of Kinnevik’s online fashion firm, Zalando. In addition to these roles, Grabau is also the co-chairman of CTC Media, a Russian media company.

== Personal ==
Grabau was born and raised in Rome, attending a French school in his early years. He had some initial success as a golfer, reaching the Italian national team at the age of 21, before eventually shelving his sporting ambitions to study economics at the La Sapienza University in Rome.

He is now married to wife Sabrina Bodmer and they have two children. Both Lorenzo and his wife are art collectors and sit on the council of the Serpentine Galleries.
