= Wesenberg, Schleswig-Holstein =

Wesenberg
- Municipality
- Coat of arms

- Location of Wesenberg within Stormarn district
- Interactive map of Wesenberg
- Location within Germany Location within Schleswig-Holstein
- Coordinates: 53°50′2″N 10°32′41″E
- Country: Germany
- State: Schleswig-Holstein
- District: Stormarn
- Municipal assoc.: Nordstormarn
- Subdivisions: 4

Government
  - Mayor: Karin Dettke (CDU)

Area
  - Total: 11.94 km^{2} (4.61 sq mi)
- Elevation: 14 m (46 ft)

Population (2025-12-31)
  - Total: 1,641
  - Density: 137.4/km^{2} (356.0/sq mi)
- Time zone: UTC+01:00 (CET)
  - Summer (DST): UTC+02:00 (CEST)
- Postal codes: 23858
- Dialling codes: 04533
- Vehicle registration: OD
- Website: www.amt- nordstormarn.de

Wesenberg (German pronunciation: [ˈveːzn̩ˌbɛʁk]) is a municipality in the district of Stormarn, in Schleswig-Holstein, Germany.
