= Jersbek =

- Municipality
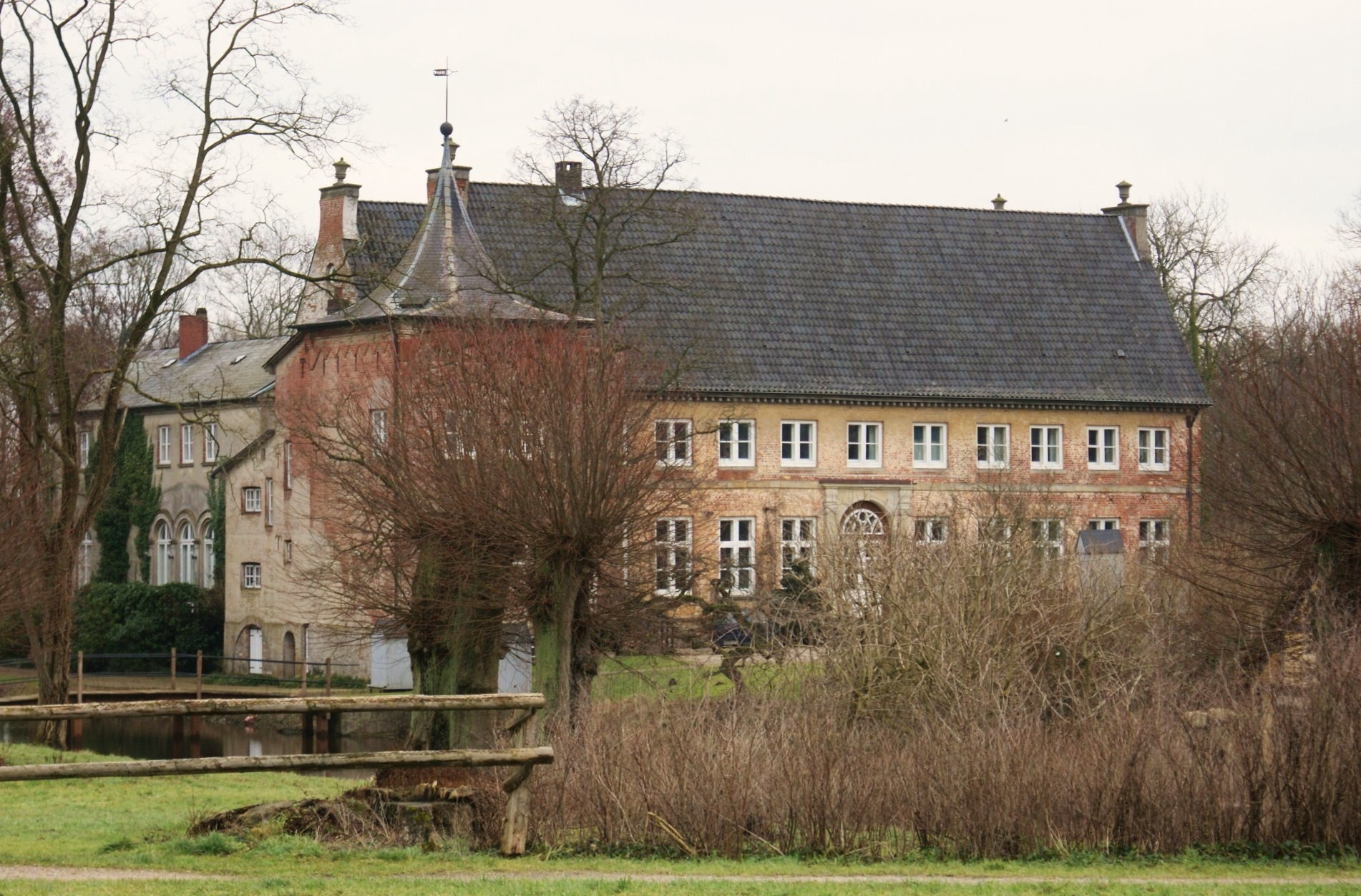
- Jersbek Manor

- Coat of arms

- Location of Jersbek within Stormarn district
- Interactive map of Jersbek
- Location within Germany Location within Schleswig-Holstein
- Coordinates: 53°44′27″N 10°13′21″E
- Country: Germany
- State: Schleswig-Holstein
- District: Stormarn
- Municipal assoc.: Bargteheide-Land

Government
  - Mayor: Herbert Sczech

Area
  - Total: 17.92 km^{2} (6.92 sq mi)
- Elevation: 20–55 m (66–180 ft)

Population (2025-12-31)
  - Total: 1,756
  - Density: 97.99/km^{2} (253.8/sq mi)
- Time zone: UTC+01:00 (CET)
  - Summer (DST): UTC+02:00 (CEST)
- Postal codes: 22941
- Dialling codes: 04532
- Vehicle registration: OD
- Website: www.bargteheide- land.de

Jersbek is a municipality in the district of Stormarn, in Schleswig-Holstein, Germany.

It includes the villages of Jersbek, Klein Hansdorf and Timmerhorn.

The community is widely known for its 18th century baroque garden, founded by Bendix von Ahlefeld (1678–1757).

Since 1913, it is home to the sports club SSV Jersbek, offering activities in football, Zumba, Judo & Ju Jitsu, volleyball, darts, kids sports and fitness.
