= HEAT (magazine) =

Australian literary magazine

- Editor: Anna Thwaites
- Former editors: Ivor Indyk, Alexandra Christie
- Categories: Literature
- Frequency: Five times per year
- Publisher: Giramondo Publishing & University of Western Sydney
- Founded: 1996
- First issue: July 1996
- Country: Australia
- Language: English
- Website: http://giramondopublishing.com/heat/
- ISSN: 1326-1460

HEAT is an international Australian literary magazine published by Giramondo Publishing, an independent publisher based at Western Sydney University.

== History ==
HEAT has been produced in three distinct series. The first was first published in July 1996, with an initial series of 15 issues that ran until 2000. A second series of 24 issues began in 2001 and ended in 2011. A third series commenced publication in February 2022.

== Staff ==
The first two series of HEAT were edited by Ivor Indyk and designed by Toni Hope-Catten and Harry Williamson. The third series was edited by Alexandra Christie from 2022 to 2024 and is currently edited by Anna Thwaites. The third series is designed by Jenny Grigg.

Notable contributors have included Aravind Adiga, Lena Andersson, Roberto Bolaño, Murray Bail, John Berger, Brian Castro, Inga Clendinnen, Jenny Erpenbeck, Helen Garner, Gail Jones, Etgar Keret, David Malouf, Les Murray, Gerald Murnane, Dorothy Porter, Sheng Keyi, Charles Simic, Susan Sontag, Paul Virilio, Eliot Weinberger, Tim Winton, Alexis Wright, and Gao Xingjian.
