= Trittau =

- Municipality
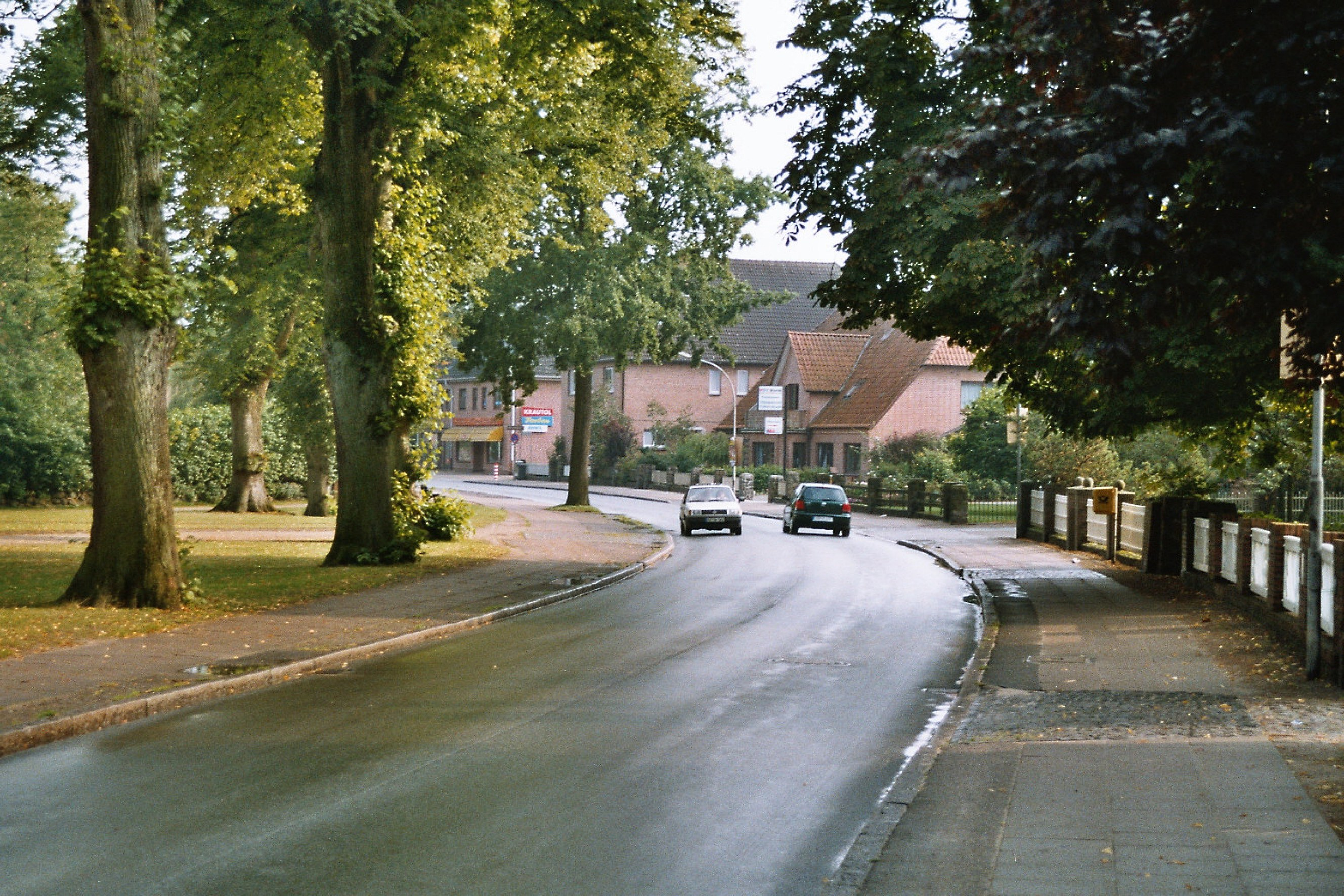

- Coat of arms

- Location of Trittau within Stormarn district
- Interactive map of Trittau
- Location within Germany Location within Schleswig-Holstein
- Coordinates: 53°37′N 10°24′E
- Country: Germany
- State: Schleswig-Holstein
- District: Stormarn
- Municipal assoc.: Trittau

Government
  - Mayor: Patrick Marsian (CDU)

Area
  - Total: 28.58 km^{2} (11.03 sq mi)
- Elevation: 36 m (118 ft)

Population (2025-12-31)
  - Total: 9,057
  - Density: 316.9/km^{2} (820.8/sq mi)
- Time zone: UTC+01:00 (CET)
  - Summer (DST): UTC+02:00 (CEST)
- Postal codes: 22946
- Dialling codes: 04154
- Vehicle registration: OD
- Website: www.trittau.de

Trittau (German pronunciation: [ˈtʁɪtaʊ]; West Low German: Trittow) is a municipality in Schleswig-Holstein, Germany, located 30 km east of Hamburg. It is the economical and administrative center of Amt Trittau, which is part of the Stormarn district. Other villages in the county are Grönwohld, Lütjensee, Großensee, Rausdorf and Grande.

== Geography ==
Trittau is located close to the Hahnheide forest. Nearby rivers are the river Aue and the river Bille. The county is abundant with small lakes.

== History ==
The Trittau village dates back to the 12th century. It was first mentioned in 1167 in a document of Duke Henry the Lion. In those days it was situated close to the Hamburg - Rostock and Hamburg - Lübeck trade routes.

The village then consisted of a Saxon part (Groß-Trittau) and a Wagrian part (Klein-Trittau). In 1326, a castle was built to defend the region and the trade route against the Scarpenberg knights from nearby Linau castle.

== Personalities associated with the community ==
- Joachim Heinrich Campe (1746-1818), enlightened educator, publicist and linguist
- Caroline Rudolphi (1753-1811), educator, poet, author, founded an institute for girls' education in Trittau
- Theodor Steltzer (1885-1967), politician (CDU), 1946-1947 introduced Minister President of Schleswig-Holstein
- Arno Surminski (1934-), writer, novel Kudenow or weep at strange waters
- Bernd Heinrich (1940-), professor of biology, spent his childhood as a refugee child with his family in a forest hut in the Hahnheide
- Jürgen Blin (1943-), boxer, lived during his career in Trittau
- Irmgard Riessen (1944-), theater and television actress, lives in Trittau
