= Reinfeld, Schleswig-Holstein =

Reinfeld
- Town
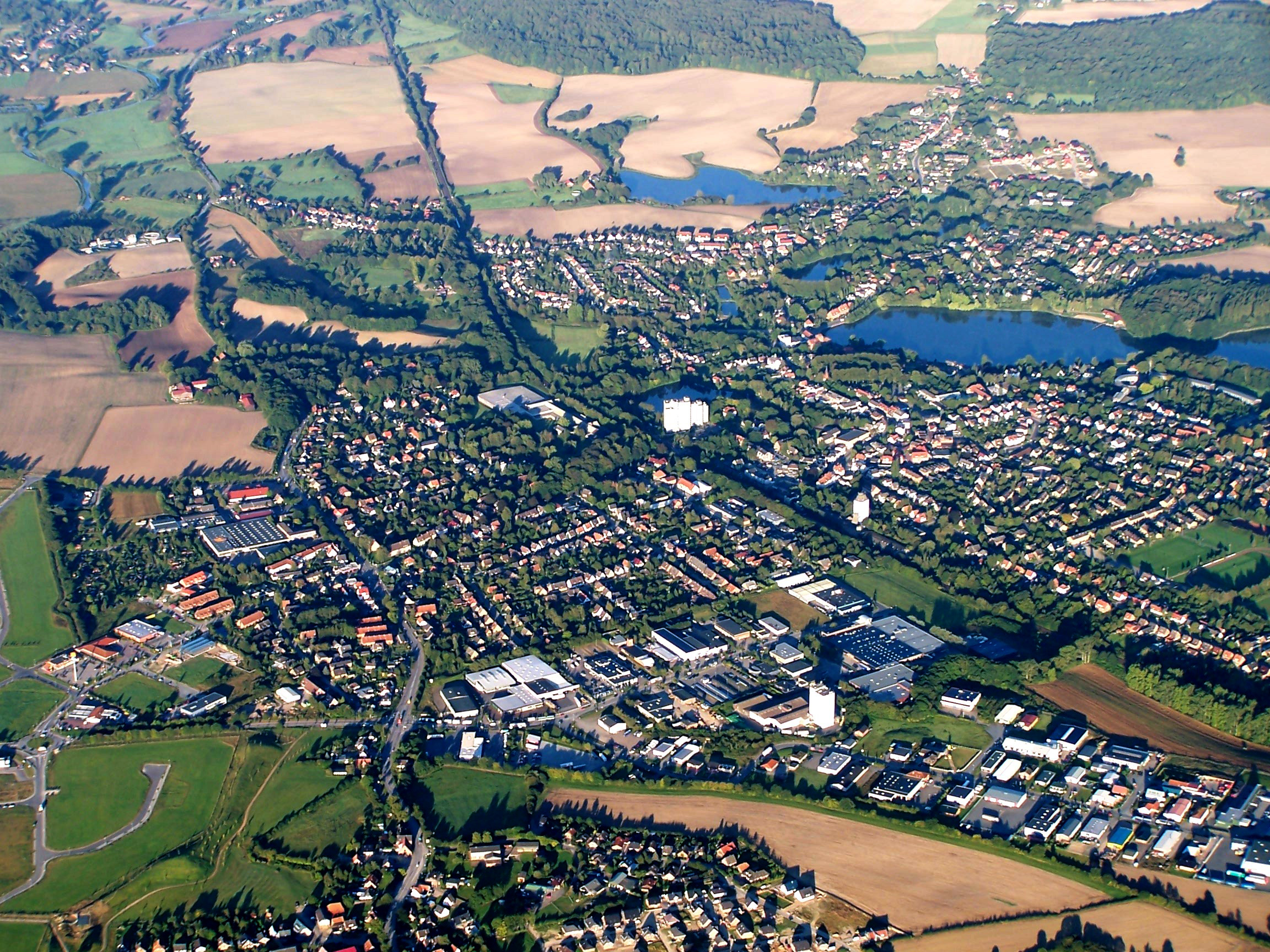

- Coat of arms

- Location of Reinfeld within Stormarn district
- Interactive map of Reinfeld
- Location within Germany Location within Schleswig-Holstein
- Coordinates: 53°50′N 10°29′E
- Country: Germany
- State: Schleswig-Holstein
- District: Stormarn

Government
  - Mayor: Gerhard Horn
  - Governing parties: CDU

Area
  - Total: 17.37 km^{2} (6.71 sq mi)
- Elevation: 19 m (62 ft)

Population (2025-12-31)
  - Total: 9,127
  - Density: 525.4/km^{2} (1,361/sq mi)
- Time zone: UTC+01:00 (CET)
  - Summer (DST): UTC+02:00 (CEST)
- Postal codes: 23854–23858
- Dialling codes: 04533
- Vehicle registration: OD
- Website: www.reinfeld.de

Reinfeld (German pronunciation: [ˈʁaɪnfɛlt]) is a town in the district of Stormarn, in Schleswig-Holstein, Germany. It is situated near the river Trave, approx. 8 km east of Bad Oldesloe, and 14 km west of Lübeck. It belongs to the Hamburg Metropolitan Region.

== History ==
In 1186 monks from the Cistercian abbey of Loccum founded the monastery of Reynevelde near where the stream Heilsau meets the river Trave. The monks created about 60 ponds to raise fish to eat on the days meat was not allowed. The Abbey prospered until the Reformation. Johan of Plön is said to have been buried in the abbey in 1359 among other "nobles". In 1582 it was closed down by the dukes of Plön and most of the buildings except for the church demolished. A four winged castle was built 1599–1604 from the material. When the Plön line of the Dukes died out in 1761 the duchy of Plön including Reinfeld and the castle fell to King Frederick V of Denmark. The castle was considered useless and was demolished in 1775, the old bricks being reused for a new yet smaller building. In 1635 the dam of the Herrenteich broke and the water damaged the old abbey church so it had to be taken down. A new Church was built the following year on a nearby hill called "Eichberg" (Oak hill).

The Danes ruled in Reinfeld from 1762 until 1864. After a short period under Austrian rule as a result of the Second War of Schleswig, Holstein became a province of Prussia in 1866. Reinfeld became officially a town in 1926.

== Coat of arms ==
The coat of arms is divided in two, the top half shows on a red background in yellow an Abbots crosier with the opening to the right and two stems of wheat with ears pointing away from the centre diagonally. The bottom half shows on a blue background a silver carp from the side swimming to the left.

=== Partnerships ===
- Neubukow, Mecklenburg-Vorpommern, Germany, since 1991
- Saint-Pryvé-Saint-Mesmin, France, since 1994
- Kaliska, Poland, since 1998

== Transportation ==
Reinfeld has a railway station on the line between Hamburg and Lübeck. The line was opened in 1865 by the Lübeck-Büchener Eisenbahn with the original station building still standing. As of 2007 the line is being electrified as one of the last sections on the Vogelfluglinie. The town is touched by the Federal Highway (Bundesstraße) B 75, that connects Hamburg and Lübeck. When an old level crossing between Bad Oldesloe and Reinfeld with the Hamburg-Lübeck railway line was turned into an underpass an old cobblestone section underneath the newer road surface reappeared and was preserved as a path for the nearby woods. The Bundesautobahn 1 runs just east of Reinfeld that has its own exit (25).

== People ==
- The poet Matthias Claudius was born here on 15 August 1740.
- Photographer Erich Retzlaff was born here in 1899
- Paul von Schoenaich was a General Major and later pacifist. He was the president of the German Peace Society 1929–1933 and 1946–1951. He died in Reinfeld on 7 January 1954.
