= Ivor Indyk =

Australian literary academic (born 1949)

Ivor Indyk OAM
- Born: 1949 (age 76–77)
- Education: University of Sydney (B.A.); University College London (Ph.D.)
- Occupations: literary academic, editor, publisher, professor
- Relatives: Martin Indyk (brother); Evelyn Juers (wife)

External image
- Ivor Indyk, by Virginia Wallace-Crabbe (National Library of Australia

Ivor Indyk (born 1949) is an Australian literary academic, editor and publisher. He is a professor at the University of Western Sydney, and the founding editor and publisher of award-winning literary imprint Giramondo Publishing and HEAT magazine.

Indyk grew up in Sydney, the elder son of Polish Jewish parents who had emigrated from Poland to the United Kingdom. He undertook his Bachelor of Arts at the University of Sydney, and received a PhD from University College London. He has previously taught at the University of Sydney and University of Newcastle; in the late 1970s, he lectured for four years at the University of Geneva. He was named the Whitlam Chair in Writing and Society at the University of Western Sydney in 2005.

Indyk was co-editor of the literary periodical Southerly between 1989 and 1993, before founding the literary magazine HEAT in 1996. In 2001, he took a part-time appointment at the University of Newcastle to launch a new series of HEAT. In 1995, he founded Giramondo Publishing.

Alongside many academic articles and newspaper reviews, Indyk was the author of a 1993 monograph on Australian writer David Malouf. The late academic and diplomat Martin Indyk was his brother. He has been married to the writer and critic Evelyn Juers since 1978.

Indyk was awarded the Medal of the Order of Australia in the 2025 King's Birthday Honours.
