= Elisabeth Hase =

German photographer (1905–1991)

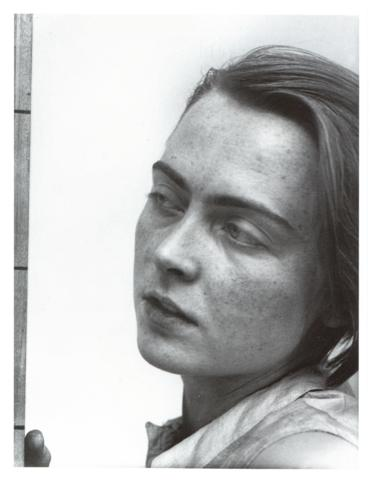
Elisabeth Hase

Elisabeth Hase (December 16, 1905 – October 9, 1991) was a German commercial and documentary photographer active in Frankfurt from 1932 until her death in 1991, at the age of 85.

== Life and work ==
Hase was born in Döhlen bei Leipzig, Germany. She studied typography and commercial art from 1924 to 1929 at the School of Applied Arts, and later at the Städelschule, under, among other teachers, Paul Renner and Willi Baumeister.

Hase was active as a photographer during the time of the transition from the Weimar Republic to the Third Reich and through post-WWII Germany. She was able to avoid government oversight of her work by establishing her own photographic studio in 1933.

Hase's work included surreal photography, such as close-up photographs of dolls.

She received several awards, several for paper designs and collages. During a two-year collaboration in the studio of Paul Wolff and Alfred Tritschler, Hase took architectural photographs in New Objectivity style for the magazine Das Neue Frankfurt (The New Frankfurt) and documentary photographs of modern housing projects, including those of Ferdinand Kramer.

In 1932, Hase started her own business. It focused on timeless designs like still life, structures, plants, dolls, people, especially self-portraits. Often she used herself as a model in her photographic "picture stories." Cooperation with agencies like Holland Press Service and the Agency Schostal enabled her to publish her photographs internationally.

Despite the bombing of Frankfurt in 1944 by the Allies, Hare's photographic archive survived the war without major damage. Many of those works are now part of the collections held by the Folkwang Museum in Essen, Germany, in the Albertina (Vienna) in Vienna, and in the Walter Gropius estate in the Bauhaus Archive in Berlin, as well as in private collections in Germany and abroad.

Despite loss of her cameras and other technical equipment in the chaos of war, Hase was able to resume taking photographs in 1946 by the help of emigre friends who provided her with film and cameras to use. Among other subjects Hase documented was the reconstruction of St. Paul's Church in Frankfurt.

From 1949, her work focused on advertising, consisting mostly of plant portraits.

Hase died at the age of 85 in 1991 in Frankfurt am Main.

== Publications ==
- „Elisabeth Hase, Portrait einer Fotografin" in Fotogeschichte Jg.1, Heft 2, 1981, Hsg. Timm Starl
- Katalog „Elisabeth Hase", Steidl Verlag 2003, Hrsg. Prof. Ute Eskildsen
- Lohmann, Gabriele: „Elisabeth Hase. Fotografin für Presse und Werbung. Die 1930er bis 50er Jahre", elektron. Diss. Ruhr-Universität Bochum, Bochum 2003 (online, retrieved, January 23, 2015)
- Katalog „nützlich, süss und museal / das fotografierte Tier", Folkwang Museum, Steidl Verlag
- „Unsere Zeit hat ein neues Formgefühl", Arbeiten aus der Fotografischen Sammlung des Museum Folkwang, 2012
- Publikationen mit Abbldg. Von E. Hase ab 1932 in zahlreichen Büchern, Zeitungen und Zeitschriften
