= Stormarn (district) =

Coordinates: 53°45′N 10°20′E

- District
- Flag Coat of arms
- Country: Germany
- State: Schleswig-Holstein
- Capital: Bad Oldesloe

Government
  - District admin.: Henning Görtz (CDU)

Area
  - Total: 766 km^{2} (296 sq mi)

Population (31 December 2024)
  - Total: 246,974
  - Density: 322/km^{2} (835/sq mi)
- Time zone: UTC+01:00 (CET)
  - Summer (DST): UTC+02:00 (CEST)
- Vehicle registration: OD
- Website: kreis-stormarn.de

Stormarn (German pronunciation: [ˈʃtɔʁmaʁn]) is a district in Schleswig-Holstein, Germany. It is bounded by (from the north and clockwise) the districts of Segeberg and Ostholstein, the city of Lübeck, the district of Lauenburg, and the city-state of Hamburg.

== History ==
In medieval times the name Stormarn was applied to a larger area, of which the present-day district is only the eastern half. It was the home of the Saxon tribe the Sturmarii.

Stormarn became a part of Holstein in the 12th century. When Schleswig-Holstein became a province of Prussia in 1867, the Prussian administration established the district of Stormarn, with Wandsbek as its capital. In 1937 the southwestern part of the district was incorporated into Hamburg, and the district lost half of its population. Since Wandsbek was now a borough of Hamburg, the capital was moved to Bad Oldesloe after the war. In 1970 Stormarn again lost a substantial portion of its territory, when the city of Norderstedt was founded in order to become a part of the Segeberg district.

== Geography ==
The river Trave runs through the district before entering the city of Lübeck. In the southernmost portion of Stormarn there are the eastern suburbs of the Hamburg metropolitan area.

== Coat of arms ==
The coat of arms displays a white swan, with a crown around its neck, on red ground. The swan has been the heraldic animal of Stormarn since the Middle Ages.

== Towns and municipalities ==
Clickable map of towns and municipalities in the district

Independent towns
1. Ahrensburg
2. Bad Oldesloe
3. Bargteheide
4. Glinde
5. Reinbek
6. Reinfeld
Independent municipalities
1. Ammersbek
2. Barsbüttel
3. Großhansdorf
4. Oststeinbek

Ämter
1. Bad Oldesloe-Land; [seat: Bad Oldesloe]: 1. Grabau; 2. Lasbek; 3. Meddewade; 4. Neritz; 5. Pölitz; 6. Rethwisch; 7. Rümpel; 8. Steinburg; 9. Travenbrück; 2. Bargteheide-Land; [seat: Bargteheide]: 1. Bargfeld-Stegen; 2. Delingsdorf; 3. Elmenhorst; 4. Hammoor; 5. Jersbek; 6. Nienwohld; 7. Todendorf; 8. Tremsbüttel	3. Itzstedt [seat: Itzstedt] (the other 6 municipalities of the Amt belong to the district of Segeberg); 1. Tangstedt; 4. Nordstormarn; [seat: Reinfeld]: 1. Badendorf; 2. Barnitz; 3. Feldhorst; 4. Hamberge; 5. Heidekamp; 6. Heilshoop; 7. Klein Wesenberg; 8. Mönkhagen; 9. Rehhorst; 10. Wesenberg; 11. Westerau; 12. Zarpen	5. Siek; 1. Braak; 2. Brunsbek; 3. Hoisdorf; 4. Siek^{1}; 5. Stapelfeld; 6. Trittau; 1. Grande; 2. Grönwohld; 3. Großensee; 4. Hamfelde; 5. Hohenfelde; 6. Köthel; 7. Lütjensee; 8. Rausdorf; 9. Trittau^{1}; 10. Witzhave
^{1}seat of the Amt

== Transport ==
Logo of the transport association HVV

Stormarn district is located in the area of the transport association Hamburger Verkehrsverbund (HVV).
