= Neritz =

- Municipality
- Coat of arms

- Location of Neritz within Stormarn district
- Interactive map of Neritz
- Location within Germany Location within Schleswig-Holstein
- Coordinates: 53°47′8″N 10°17′18″E
- Country: Germany
- State: Schleswig-Holstein
- District: Stormarn
- Municipal assoc.: Bad Oldesloe-Land

Government
  - Mayor: Dieter Dabelstein

Area
  - Total: 4.66 km^{2} (1.80 sq mi)
- Elevation: 20 m (66 ft)

Population (2025-12-31)
  - Total: 356
  - Density: 76.4/km^{2} (198/sq mi)
- Time zone: UTC+01:00 (CET)
  - Summer (DST): UTC+02:00 (CEST)
- Postal codes: 23843
- Dialling codes: 04531
- Vehicle registration: OD
- Website: www.amt-bad- oldesloe-land.de

Neritz is a municipality in the district of Stormarn, in Schleswig-Holstein, Germany.
