= Stapelfeld =

- Municipality
- Coat of arms

- Location of Stapelfeld within Stormarn district
- Interactive map of Stapelfeld
- Location within Germany Location within Schleswig-Holstein
- Coordinates: 53°36′N 10°13′E
- Country: Germany
- State: Schleswig-Holstein
- District: Stormarn
- Municipal assoc.: Siek

Government
  - Mayor: Jürgen Westphal

Area
  - Total: 10.12 km^{2} (3.91 sq mi)
- Elevation: 46 m (151 ft)

Population (2025-12-31)
  - Total: 1,839
  - Density: 181.7/km^{2} (470.7/sq mi)
- Time zone: UTC+01:00 (CET)
  - Summer (DST): UTC+02:00 (CEST)
- Postal codes: 22145
- Dialling codes: 040
- Vehicle registration: OD
- Website: www.amtsiek.de

Stapelfeld is a municipality in the district of Stormarn, in Schleswig-Holstein, Germany.
