= Siek (Amt) =

Municipality in Schleswig-Holstein, Germany

- Amt
- Map of Stormarn highlighting Siek
- Interactive map of Siek
- Location within Germany Location within Schleswig-Holstein
- Coordinates: 53°38′N 10°18′E
- Country: Germany
- State: Schleswig-Holstein
- District: Stormarn
- Seat: Siek
- Subdivisions: 5 municipalities

Area
  - Total: 60.56 km^{2} (23.38 sq mi)

Population (2025-12-31)
  - Total: 10,526
  - Density: 173.8/km^{2} (450.2/sq mi)
- Time zone: UTC+01:00 (CET)
  - Summer (DST): UTC+02:00 (CEST)
- Website: www.amtsiek.de

Siek is an Amt ("collective municipality") in the district of Stormarn, in Schleswig-Holstein, Germany. The seat of the Amt is in Siek.

The Amt Siek consists of the following municipalities:

1. Braak
2. Brunsbek
3. Hoisdorf
4. Siek
5. Stapelfeld
