= Braak, Schleswig-Holstein =

- Municipality
- Coat of arms

- Location of Braak, Schleswig-Holstein within Stormarn district
- Interactive map of Braak, Schleswig-Holstein
- Location within Germany Location within Schleswig-Holstein
- Coordinates: 53°36′39″N 10°14′48″E
- Country: Germany
- State: Schleswig-Holstein
- District: Stormarn
- Municipal assoc.: Siek

Government
  - Mayor: Ortwin Jahnke (CDU)

Area
  - Total: 7.51 km^{2} (2.90 sq mi)
- Elevation: 58 m (190 ft)

Population (2025-12-31)
  - Total: 974
  - Density: 130/km^{2} (336/sq mi)
- Time zone: UTC+01:00 (CET)
  - Summer (DST): UTC+02:00 (CEST)
- Postal codes: 22145
- Dialling codes: 040
- Vehicle registration: OD
- Website: www.amtsiek.de

Braak (German pronunciation: [bʁaːk]) is a municipality in the district of Stormarn, in Schleswig-Holstein, Germany.
