= Siek, Holstein =

Siek
- Municipality
- Coat of arms

- Location of Siek within Stormarn district
- Interactive map of Siek
- Location within Germany Location within Schleswig-Holstein
- Coordinates: 53°38′4″N 10°17′53″E
- Country: Germany
- State: Schleswig-Holstein
- District: Stormarn
- Municipal assoc.: Siek

Government
  - Mayor: Hans-Peter Rönner (CDU)

Area
  - Total: 12.47 km^{2} (4.81 sq mi)
- Elevation: 57 m (187 ft)

Population (2025-12-31)
  - Total: 2,410
  - Density: 193/km^{2} (501/sq mi)
- Time zone: UTC+01:00 (CET)
  - Summer (DST): UTC+02:00 (CEST)
- Postal codes: 22962
- Dialling codes: 04107
- Vehicle registration: OD
- Website: www.amtsiek.de

Siek (German pronunciation: [ziːk]) is a municipality in the district of Stormarn in Schleswig-Holstein, Germany. It is situated approximately 6 kilometres (3.7 mi) southeast of Ahrensburg, and 24 kilometres (15 mi) northeast of Hamburg.

Siek is the seat of the Amt ("collective municipality") Siek.
