= Köthel, Lauenburg =

Köthel
- Municipality
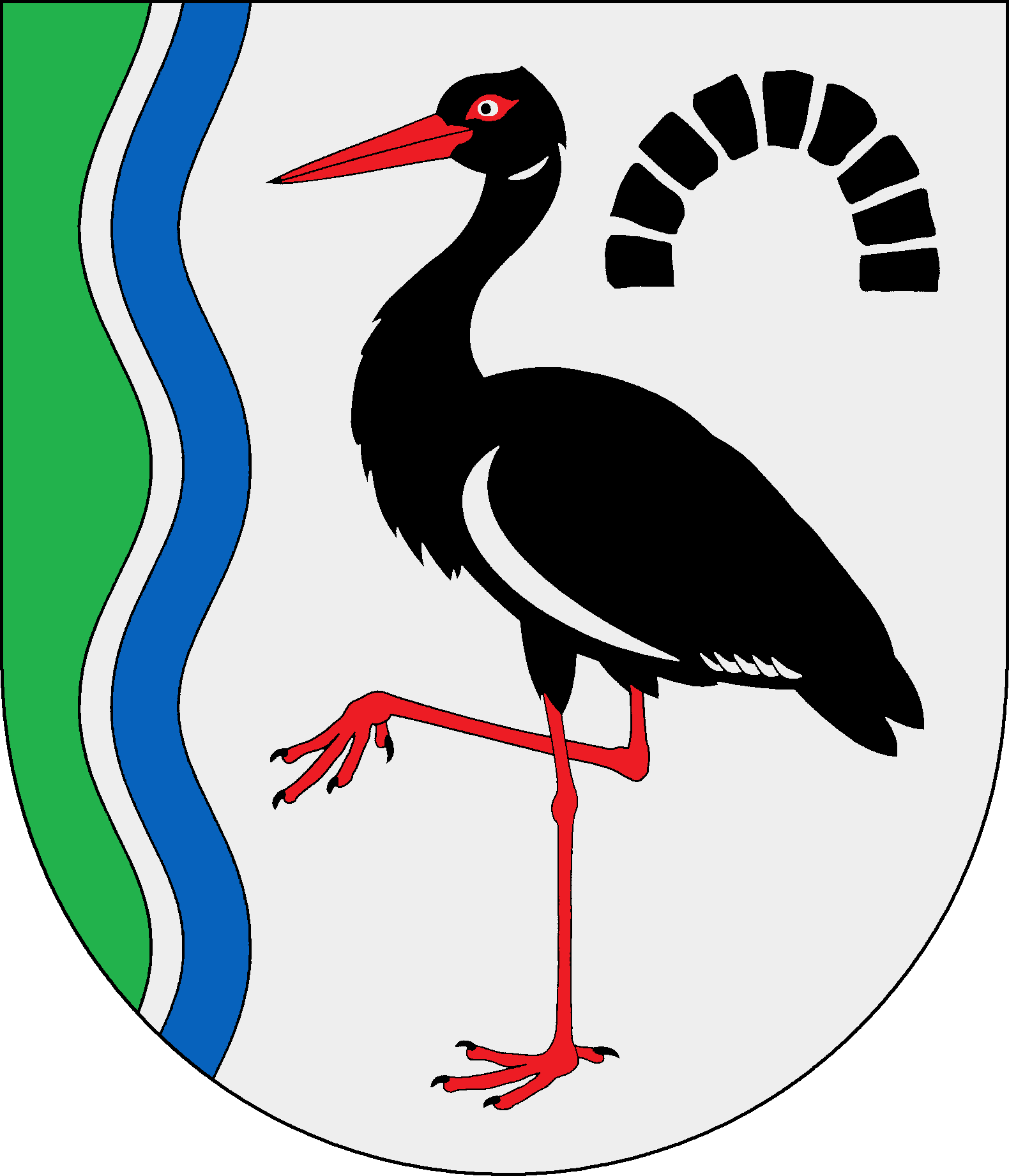
- Coat of arms

- Location of Köthel within Herzogtum Lauenburg district
- Interactive map of Köthel
- Location within Germany Location within Schleswig-Holstein
- Coordinates: 53°36′35″N 10°30′42″E
- Country: Germany
- State: Schleswig-Holstein
- District: Herzogtum Lauenburg
- Municipal assoc.: Schwarzenbek-Land

Government
  - Mayor: Timm Peters

Area
  - Total: 1.52 km^{2} (0.59 sq mi)
- Elevation: 38 m (125 ft)

Population (2025-12-31)
  - Total: 306
  - Density: 201/km^{2} (521/sq mi)
- Time zone: UTC+01:00 (CET)
  - Summer (DST): UTC+02:00 (CEST)
- Postal codes: 22929
- Dialling codes: 04159
- Vehicle registration: RZ
- Website: gemeinde-koethel.de

Köthel (German pronunciation: [ˈkøːtl̩]) is a municipality in the district of Lauenburg, in Schleswig-Holstein, Germany.
