= Bundesautobahn 21 =

Federal motorway in Germany

A 21
- Bundesautobahn 21

Route information
- Length: 50 km (31 mi)

Major junctions
- North end: Bundesstraße 404 in Klein Barkau, Schleswig-Holstein
- South end: Bundesautobahn 1 in Hammoor, Schleswig-Holstein

Location
- Country: Germany
- States: Schleswig-Holstein, Lower Saxony (planned)

Highway system
- Roads in Germany; Autobahns; List; Federal; List; State; E-roads
← A 20	→ A 23

Bundesautobahn 21 (translates from German as Federal Motorway 21, short form Autobahn 21, abbreviated as BAB 21 or A 21) is an autobahn in Germany.

It runs from an interchange with the A 1 at Bargteheide to Wankendorf, halfway between Bad Segeberg and Kiel. A northbound extension to Kiel and a southbound extension connecting to the A 39 are being planned. The A 21 will cross the extension of the A 20 near Bad Segeberg.

In 2026, the A21 will be completed until Klein Barkau.

The A21 is planned to end at the Barkau Interchange when it's completed.

== Exit list ==
State	District	Location	km	mi	Exit	Name	Destinations	Notes
Schleswig-Holstein	Kiel	Gaarden-Süd and Kronsburg			—	Kiel-Barkauer Kreuz	B 76 – Eckernförde, Lübeck; B 202 – Lütjenburg, Rendsburg ( A 210)	proposed northern endpoint of motorway
Schleswig-Holstein	Kiel	Gaarden-Süd and Kronsburg			—	Kiel-Molfsee	Schulensee ( B 202 – Lütjenburg)	Proposed junction Planned Südspange will start here
Schleswig-Holstein	Kiel	Moorsee			Bridge	Eisenbahnbrücke	Hamburg-Altona–Kiel railway	Proposed bridge
Schleswig-Holstein	Kiel	Moorsee			—	Kiel-Neumeimersdorf	Kiel-Meimersdorf	Junction currently part of the B 404
Schleswig-Holstein	Kiel	Moorsee			—	Kiel-Wellseedamm	Kiel-Wellsee, Kiel Elmschenhagen	Junction currently part of the B 404
Schleswig-Holstein	Kiel	Moorsee			—	Kiel-Industrieareal Wellsee	Kiel-Industrieareal Wellsee	Junction proposed
Schleswig-Holstein	Plön (district)	Boksee			—	Boksee/Havighorst	Boksee, Havighorst	Junction proposed
Schleswig-Holstein	Plön (district)	Klein Barkau			5	Klein Barkau	Klein Barkau, Kirchbarkau	Junction under construction
Schleswig-Holstein	Plön (district)	Löptin			—	transition from federal road	B 404 – Kiel	Transition from B 404 Current northern endpoint of motorway
Schleswig-Holstein	Plön (district)	Stolpe			6	Nettelsee	Nettelsee, Plön, Bordesholm	
Schleswig-Holstein	Plön (district)	Stolpe			Rest area	Depenauer Moor	Depenauer Moor	Access only southbound
Schleswig-Holstein	Plön (district)	Stolpe			7	Wankendorf	Wankendorf, Stolpe	
Schleswig-Holstein	Segeberg	Bornhöved			8	Bornhöved	B 430 – Bornhöved, Neumünster, Plön, Eutin	Eutin is only signed southbound
Schleswig-Holstein	Segeberg	Bornhöved			9	Trappenkamp	Trappenkamp, Rickling	Rickling is only signed southbound
Schleswig-Holstein	Segeberg	Daldorf			10	Daldorf	Daldorf, Rickling	Rickling is only signed northbound
Schleswig-Holstein	Segeberg	Negernbötel			11	Wahlstedt	B 205 – Flensburg ( A 7 / E45), Neumünster, Wahlstedt	Flensburg and Neumünster are only signed northbound
Schleswig-Holstein	Segeberg	Schackendorf			Rest area	Schackendorf	Schackendorf rest area	
Schleswig-Holstein	Segeberg	Schackendorf			—	Schackendorf	Schackendorf	Incomplete Junction: Only one entrance northbound Slip road closed in 2021
Schleswig-Holstein	Segeberg	Schackendorf			12	Bad Segeberg-Nord	Bad Segeberg, Schackendorf	Proposed exit Exit will be built along the A 20 extension
Schleswig-Holstein	Segeberg	Schackendorf			Bridge	Straßen- und Eisenbahnbrücke	Neumünster–Bad Oldesloe railway	
Schleswig-Holstein	Segeberg	Bad Segeberg			12	Bad Segeberg-Nord	B 206 – Itzehoe, Lübeck ( A 20), Bad Segeberg-Nord, Bad Segeberg-Möbel Kraft	Exit will be closed along the A 20 extension
Schleswig-Holstein	Segeberg	Högersdorf			13	Bad Segeberg interchange	A 20 – Bremerhaven, Lübeck	interchange proposed
Schleswig-Holstein	Segeberg	Högersdorf			13	Bad Segeberg-Süd	B 432 – Bad Segeberg-Süd, Hamburg Airport	Hamburg Airport is only signed southbound Exit will be closed along the A 20 extension
Schleswig-Holstein	Segeberg	Mözen			14	Schwissel	Schwissel	
Schleswig-Holstein	Segeberg	Schwissel			Rest area	Schwisseler Kamp	Schwisseler Kamp rest area	
Schleswig-Holstein	Segeberg	Neversdorf			15	Leezen	Leezen	
Schleswig-Holstein	Stormarn	Bad Oldesloe			16	Bad Oldesloe-Nord	Nütschau, Tralau, Borstel, Bad Oldesloe-Nord	
Schleswig-Holstein	Stormarn	Bad Oldesloe			17a	Bad Oldesloe-Süd	B 75 – Bad Oldesloe-Süd	
Schleswig-Holstein	Stormarn	Rümpel			17b	Rümpel	Rümpel	incomplete junction: only one entrance northbound
Schleswig-Holstein	Stormarn	Tremsbüttel			Bridge	Straßen- und Eisenbahnbrücke	Lübeck–Hamburg railway	
Schleswig-Holstein	Stormarn	Tremsbüttel			18	Tremsbüttel	Tremsbüttel	
Schleswig-Holstein	Stormarn	Tremsbüttel			Rest Area	Rehbrook	Rehbrook rest area	
Schleswig-Holstein	Stormarn	Hammoor			19	Bargteheide interchange	A 1 / E22 – Bremen, Hannover, Hamburg, Ahrensburg	incomplete interchange: no exit/entrance ramp: Kiel ↔ Lübeck, no exit/entrance ramp: Hamburg ↔ Schwarzenbek, no exit ramp Schwarzenbek → Lübeck
Schleswig-Holstein	Stormarn	Hammoor			—	transition to federal road	B 404 – Schwarzenbek	Transition to B 404 Current southern endpoint of motorway
Schleswig-Holstein	Stormarn	Hammoor			—	Bargteheide	Bargteheide, Hammoor	Proposed junction
Schleswig-Holstein	Stormarn	Todendorf			—	Todendorf/Mollhagen	Todendorf, Mollhagen	Proposed junction
Schleswig-Holstein	Stormarn	Steinburg, Stormarn			—	Todendorf/Sprenge	Todendorf, Sprenge	Proposed junction
Schleswig-Holstein	Stormarn	Lütjensee			—	Lütjensee/Schönberg	Lütjensee, Schönberg	Proposed junction
Schleswig-Holstein	Stormarn	Grönwohld			—	Lütjensee/Grönwohld	Lütjensee, Grönwohld	Proposed junction
Schleswig-Holstein	Stormarn	Trittau			—	Trittau-Nord	Trittau, Großensee	Proposed junction
Schleswig-Holstein	Stormarn	Grande			—	Trittau-Süd	Trittau, Grande	Proposed junction
Schleswig-Holstein	Herzogtum Lauenburg	Kasseburg			—	Schwarzenbek/Grande interchange	A 24 / E26 – Hamburg, Berlin	Proposed interchange
Schleswig-Holstein	Herzogtum Lauenburg	Sachsenwald			—	Schwarzenbek-Nord	B 209 – Schwarzenbek	Proposed junction
Schleswig-Holstein	Herzogtum Lauenburg	Schwarzenbek			Bridge	Eisenbahnbrücke	Berlin-Hamburg railway	Proposed bridge
Schleswig-Holstein	Herzogtum Lauenburg	Schwarzenbek			—	Schwarzenbek-West	B 207 – Hamburg-Bergedorf, Schwarzenbek	Proposed junction
Schleswig-Holstein	Herzogtum Lauenburg	Hohenhorn			—	Geesthacht-Nord	B 5 – Lauenburg	Proposed junction
Schleswig-Holstein	Herzogtum Lauenburg	Escheburg			—	Geesthacht interchange	A 25 – Hamburg	Proposed interchange
Elbe	Elbe	Elbe			Bridge	Elbe river	Elbe river bridge	Proposed bridge
Niedersachsen	Harburg (district)	Marschacht			—	Marschacht-Rönne	Marschacht, Rönne	Proposed junction
Niedersachsen	Harburg (district)	Marschacht			—	Marschacht-Eichholz	Marschacht, Eichholz	Proposed junction
Niedersachsen	Harburg (district)	Handorf			—	Handorf	Handorf, Rottdorf	Proposed junction
Niedersachsen	Harburg (district)	Bardowick			—	Handorf interchange	A 39 – Hamburg, Lüneburg	Proposed junction proposed southern endpoint of motorway
1.000 mi = 1.609 km; 1.000 km = 0.621 mi: Closed/former; Incomplete access; Proposed; Route transition
