= Nord Drivesystems =

- Nord Drivesystems logo
- Native name: Getriebebau NORD
- Founded: April 1, 1965; 61 years ago in Germany
- Founder: G. A. Küchenmeister and Günter Schlicht
- Headquarters: Bargteheide, Germany
- Area served: 50 countries
- Subsidiaries: 48
- Website: www.nord.com

Nord Drivesystems (or Getriebebau NORD) is a German worldwide mechanical and electronic solutions company. It is headquartered at Bargteheide.

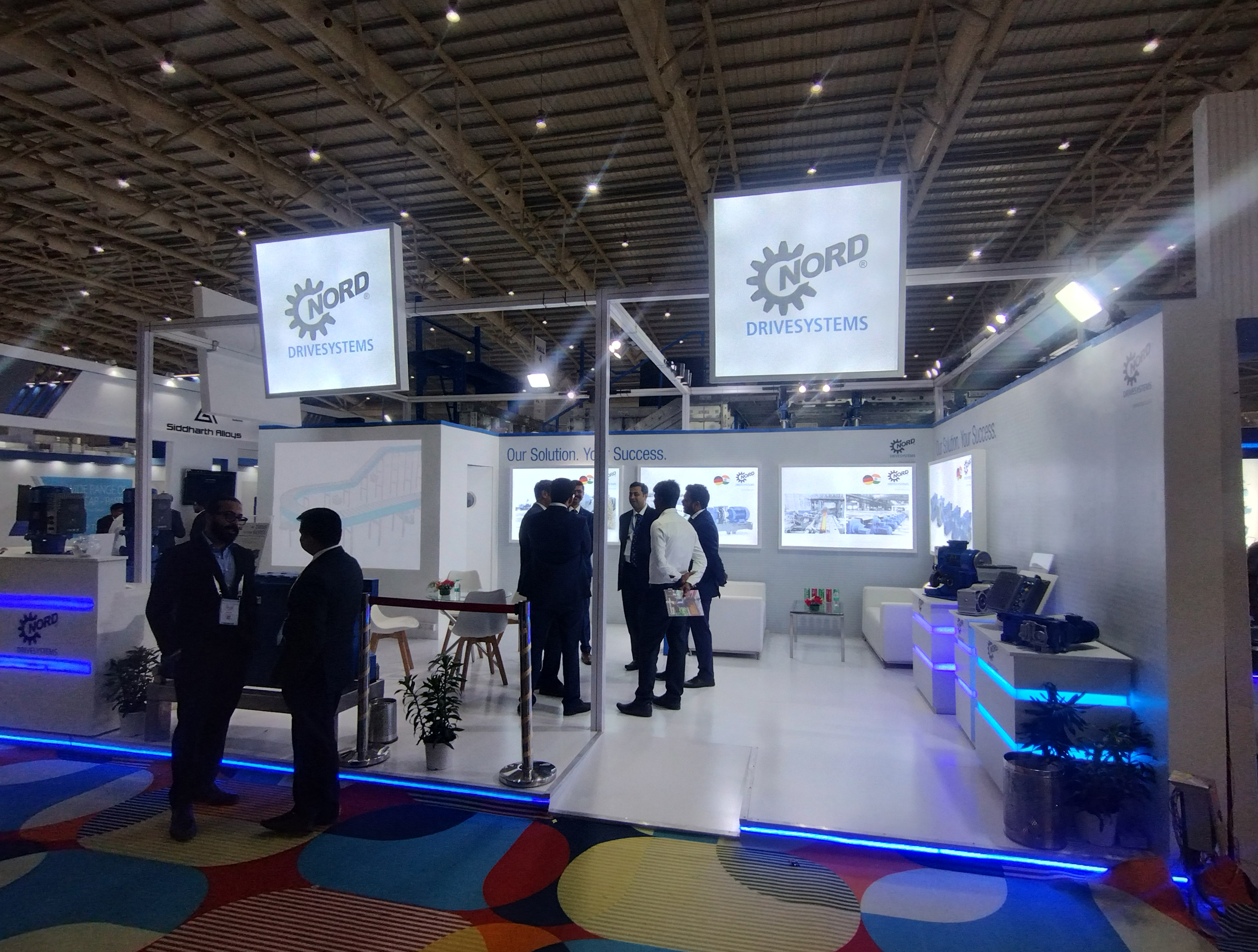
Nord Drivesystems at EXCON 2025, BIEC

== History ==
Nord Drivesystems was founded on 1 April 1965, by G. A. Küchenmeister and Günter Schlicht. Zahnradwerk Nord was established in Glinde in 1977, which currently employs about 236 people.
