= Franz Machon =

German World War II submarine officer (1918–1968)

Franz Machen
- Born: 18 March 1918; Kattowitz, Poland
- Died: 1968 (aged 50); Thanet, Kent, England
- Military career
- Allegiance: Nazi Germany
- Branch: Kriegsmarine
- Service years: 1939–1945
- Rank: Matrosengefreiter
- Conflicts: Battle of the Atlantic
- Awards: None

Matrosengefreiter Franciszek Machoń (18 March 1918 – 1968), known as Franz Machon and later as Frank J. Machon, was the only survivor of the sunken German submarine U-512, and one of few World War II U-boat survivors. His story strikes remarkable similarities with Klaus Bargsten of U-521. After his capture, Machon agreed to help the United States Navy observe behaviour characteristics of fellow German prisoners of war.

== Early life ==
Machon was born in Kattowitz (Katowice) to John and Anna Machon, two Polish commoners. In his early years he worked as a streetcar conductor while attending school. He married a woman named Mary Munik (Maria Munik) who gave birth to a son (his son was 15 months old when he was captured).

After the Nazi invasion of Poland, Machoń was drafted into the Pioneer Corp. He later requested a transfer to the Kriegsmarine in Hamburg for submarine training.

== U-512 ==
=== Sinking ===
On 2 October 1942, several hundred kilometers north of Cayenne (at position 06°50′N 52°25′W), U-512 was intercepted by depth charges from an American Douglas B-18 Bolo of the 99th Bomb Squadron. The German U-boat quickly filled with water, leaving the entire crew panicking in fear. Soon, the entire cabin was filled with chlorine gas and the crewmen began to cough. (It was guessed that the chlorine gas was produced from the batteries of the electric torpedoes.) A short time previously, the escape lungs were discovered as having been improperly stowed with the majority of them becoming wet from a buildup of condensation in the boat. Soon, air pressure in the compartment began to mount and speech became very difficult. Men began to collapse rapidly from the combined effects of chlorine and high pressure. Others started to bleed from the mouth and ears in agony.

=== Escape ===
In the next several minutes, all 51 crewmen died, except for Machon. He and a boatswain's mate opened the torpedo loading hatch. Because his crewmate had no snorkel, he let him go first and quickly followed. After exiting the boat, his crewmate got confused about the direction to the surface and swam horizontally, only to lose himself between the hull and the superstructure. Upon reaching the surface, Machon swam around for roughly 1.5 hours, unsuccessfully looking for his partner until an inflated life jacket was dropped to him from a circling airplane from the 99th Bombing Squadron. This was soon followed by a drop of a thermos outfitted with water, a signal pistol, paddles and about 200 feet (61 m) of rope.

=== The raft ===
The raft provided by the aircraft was his only form of shelter for the next 10 days. Several times, Machon unsuccessfully attempted to attract the attention of various tankers and passing aircraft by firing his signal pistol. To escape the heat, he would usually swim in the water during midday.

On the ninth day at sea, he was attacked by seabirds which pecked him on the shoulders so violently he was left with permanent scars. He managed to capture two of the birds, which he split and dried in the sun. Later, with his provisions running low, he decided to eat them, complaining slightly of their fishy taste to his interrogator.

Machon, on the verge of death, etched his name into the paddle so that his body could be identified. The next day, 12 October, he was rescued by the United States destroyer USS Ellis at position 07°50′N 56°05′W.

== Interrogation ==
When Machon was rescued, the interrogators gave some time for him to recover his health. When he was found, he was severely sunburned and emaciated.

On 19 October, he was formally interrogated. At first he was very nervous giving details to the Navy officials, but then opened up after realizing Nazi propaganda about Allied torture as an interrogation method was false. During his stay he helped Navy officials gather intelligence data on other prisoners and was extremely co-operative to his captors. After being relieved from his duties, he stayed at Fort Hunt until his release.

== Later life and death ==
On 16 April 1945 he was handed over to the Polish authorities. He briefly settled in Wirek, Poland, before relocating to the United Kingdom. He married Alice Homer in Thanet, Kent, in 1951.

Machon died in 1968 after suffering from an allergic reaction to a bee sting. At the time he was working as a chef at the Bungalow Hotel in Birchington-on-Sea.
