= Schellhorn =

- Municipality
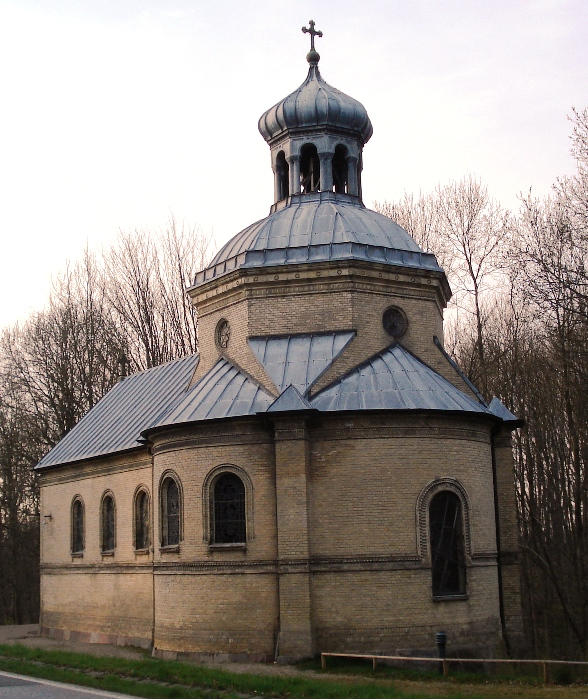
- Kapelle Sophienhof by Heinrich Scheel in Schellhorn

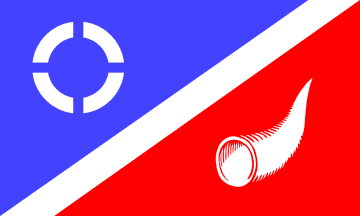
- Flag Coat of arms

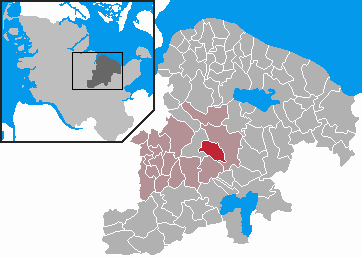
- Location of Schellhorn within Plön district
- Interactive map of Schellhorn
- Location within Germany Location within Schleswig-Holstein
- Coordinates: 54°13′46″N 10°18′2″E
- Country: Germany
- State: Schleswig-Holstein
- District: Plön
- Municipal assoc.: Preetz-Land

Government
  - Mayor: Klaus Schildknecht

Area
  - Total: 10.54 km^{2} (4.07 sq mi)
- Elevation: 33 m (108 ft)

Population (2025-12-31)
  - Total: 1,498
  - Density: 142.1/km^{2} (368.1/sq mi)
- Time zone: UTC+01:00 (CET)
  - Summer (DST): UTC+02:00 (CEST)
- Postal codes: 24211
- Dialling codes: 04342
- Vehicle registration: PLÖ
- Website: www.amtpreetzland.de

Schellhorn is a municipality in the district of Plön, in Schleswig-Holstein, Germany.
