= Preetz-Land =

- Amt
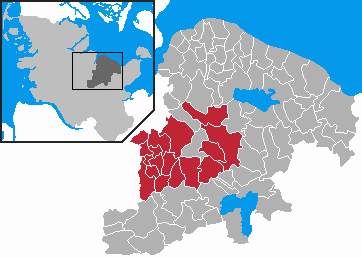
- Map of Plön highlighting Preetz-Land
- Interactive map of Preetz-Land
- Location within Germany Location within Schleswig-Holstein
- Coordinates: 54°14′N 10°18′E
- Country: Germany
- State: Schleswig-Holstein
- District: Plön
- Seat: Schellhorn
- Subdivisions: 17 municipalities

Government
  - Mayor: Kai Johanssen

Area
  - Total: 191.05 km^{2} (73.76 sq mi)

Population (2025-12-31)
  - Total: 9,095
  - Density: 47.61/km^{2} (123.3/sq mi)
- Time zone: UTC+01:00 (CET)
  - Summer (DST): UTC+02:00 (CEST)
- Website: www.amtpreetzland.de

Preetz-Land is an Amt ("collective municipality") in the district of Plön, in Schleswig-Holstein, Germany. It is situated around Preetz. The seat of the Amt is Schellhorn.

== Subdivision ==
The Amt Preetz-Land consists of the following municipalities:

1. Barmissen
2. Boksee
3. Bothkamp
4. Großbarkau
5. Honigsee
6. Kirchbarkau
7. Klein Barkau
8. Kühren
9. Lehmkuhlen
10. Löptin
11. Nettelsee
12. Pohnsdorf
13. Postfeld
14. Rastorf
15. Schellhorn
16. Wahlstorf
17. Warnau
