= Honigsee =

- Municipality
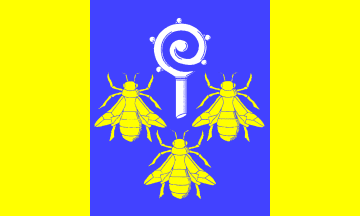
- Flag Coat of arms

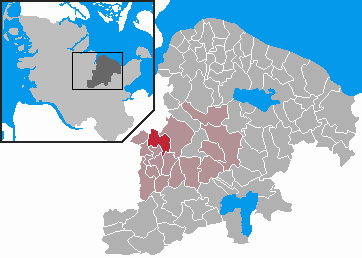
- Location of Honigsee within Plön district
- Interactive map of Honigsee
- Location within Germany Location within Schleswig-Holstein
- Coordinates: 54°13′N 10°10′E
- Country: Germany
- State: Schleswig-Holstein
- District: Plön
- Municipal assoc.: Preetz-Land

Government
  - Mayor: Alexander Nicolaisen

Area
  - Total: 11.27 km^{2} (4.35 sq mi)
- Elevation: 43 m (141 ft)

Population (2025-12-31)
  - Total: 434
  - Density: 38.5/km^{2} (99.7/sq mi)
- Time zone: UTC+01:00 (CET)
  - Summer (DST): UTC+02:00 (CEST)
- Postal codes: 24211
- Dialling codes: 04302
- Vehicle registration: PLÖ
- Website: www.amtpreetzland.de

Honigsee is a municipality in the district of Plön, in Schleswig-Holstein, Germany.
