= Arboretum Lehmkuhlen =

Garden in Germany

Coordinates: 54.2263°N 10.3606°E

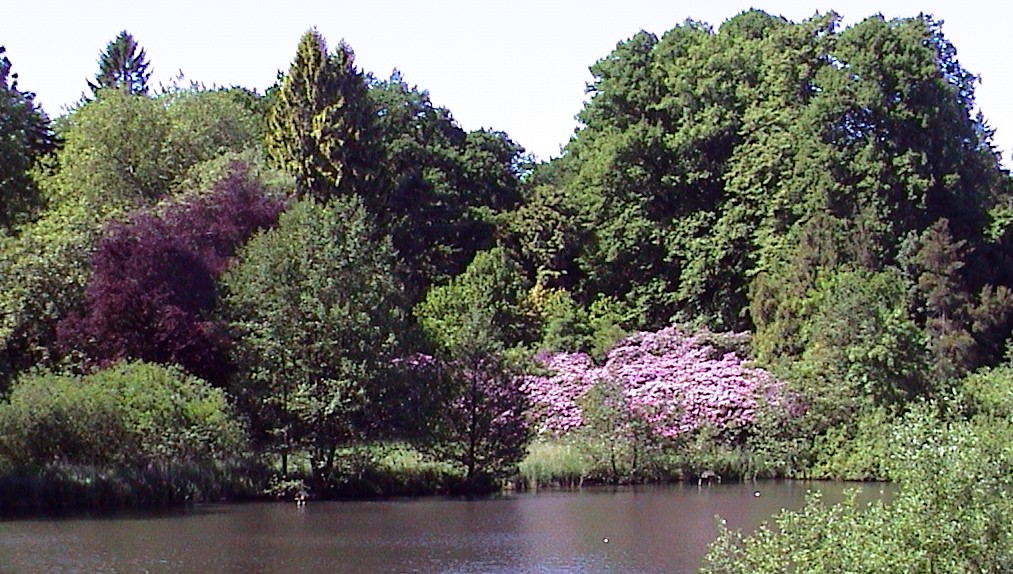
Arboretum Lehmkuhlen

The Arboretum Lehmkuhlen (50 hectares) is an arboretum maintained by the Guts- und Forstverwaltung Lehmkuhlen. It is located in Lehmkuhlen, Schleswig-Holstein, Germany, and open by appointment only.

The arboretum was created between 1911-1928 by Cosmos von Milde under Conrad Hinrich IV. Freiherr von Donner, who planted approximately 1500 tree specimens from around the world. Today the arboretum contains about 3200 individual plants of approximately 1000 specimens, including mature specimens of Abies grandis, Abies nordmanniana, Fraxinus ornus, Juglans ailantifolia, Mespilus germanica, Quercus alba, Quercus castaneifolia, Quercus dentata, and Quercus trojana. A municipal cemetery has been created in its northwestern corner.

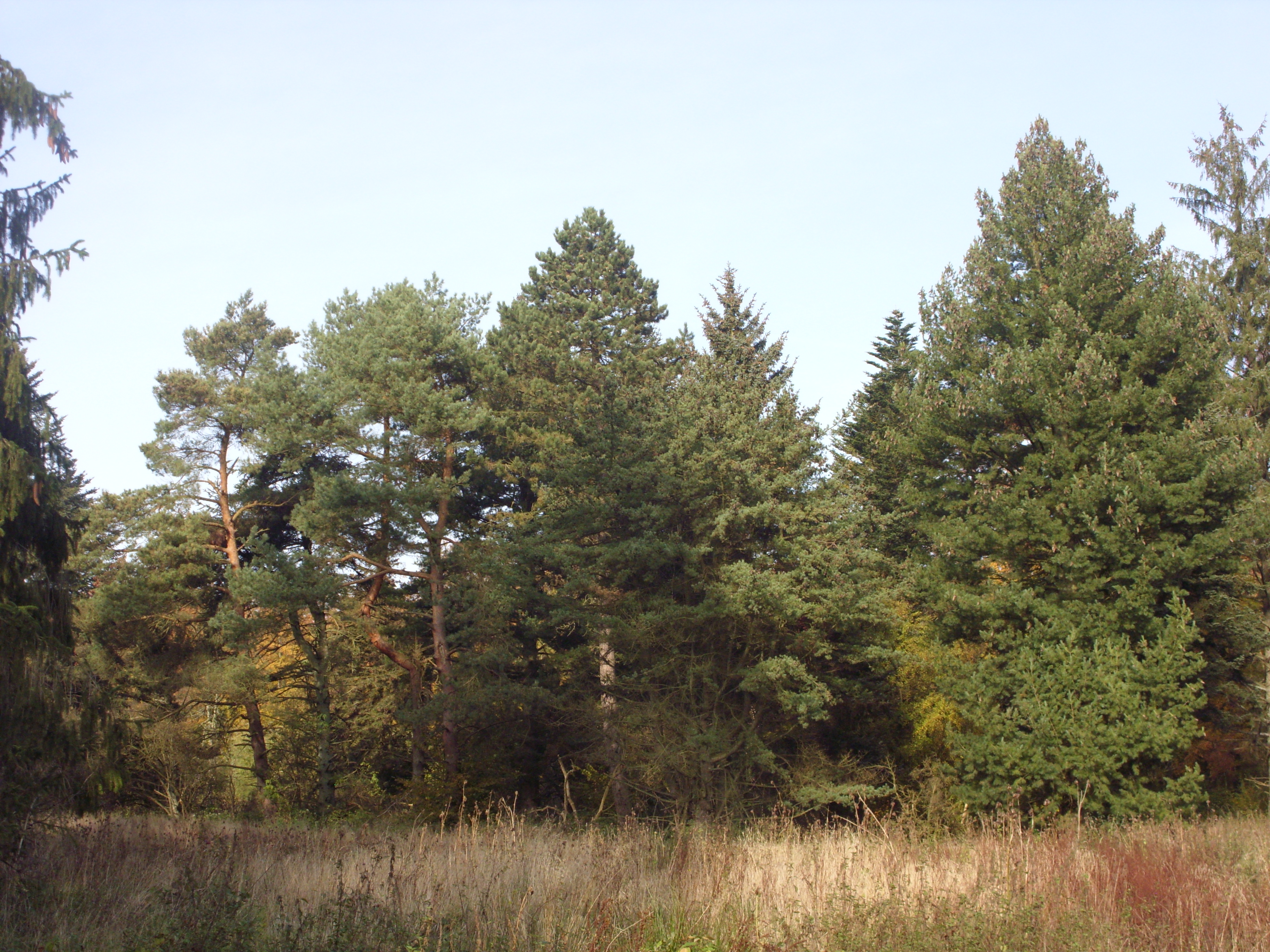
Fir trees of various species
