= Warnau =

- Municipality
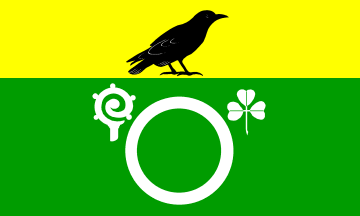
- Flag Coat of arms

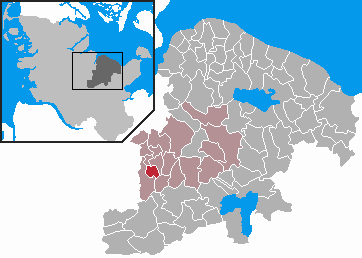
- Location of Warnau within Plön district
- Interactive map of Warnau
- Location within Germany Location within Schleswig-Holstein
- Coordinates: 54°11′N 10°10′E
- Country: Germany
- State: Schleswig-Holstein
- District: Plön
- Municipal assoc.: Preetz-Land

Government
  - Mayor: Günther Danklefsen (SPD)

Area
  - Total: 3.98 km^{2} (1.54 sq mi)
- Elevation: 43 m (141 ft)

Population (2025-12-31)
  - Total: 383
  - Density: 96.2/km^{2} (249/sq mi)
- Time zone: UTC+01:00 (CET)
  - Summer (DST): UTC+02:00 (CEST)
- Postal codes: 24250
- Dialling codes: 04302
- Vehicle registration: PLÖ
- Website: www.amtpreetzland.de

Warnau (German pronunciation: [ˈvaʁnaʊ]) is a municipality in the district of Plön, in Schleswig-Holstein, Germany.

== History ==
The Warini were a Germanic people originally from southern Scandinavia but who lived in the Warnau region.
