= USS PC-565 =

History

United States
- Name: USS PC-565
- Builder: Brown Shipbuilding Company, Houston, TX
- Laid down: 14 August 1941
- Launched: 27 February 1942
- Commissioned: 25 May 1942
- Decommissioned: 26 April 1946
- Renamed: Gilmer (PC-565), 15 February 1956
- Stricken: 1 July 1960
- Fate: Sold to Venezuela, c. 1960

History

Venezuela
- Name: ARV Alcatras
- Acquired: c. 1960
- Fate: unknown

General characteristics
- Class & type: PC-461-class submarine chaser
- Displacement: 295 tons fully loaded
- Length: 175 ft (53 m)
- Beam: 23 ft (7.0 m)
- Draft: 10 ft 10 in (3.30 m)
- Propulsion: 2 2,880bhp Fairbanks Morse 38D8 1/8 diesel engines (Serial Nos 832229 & 832230)
- Speed: 20 knots
- Complement: 59
- Armament: 1 × 3 in (76 mm)/50 cal dual purpose gun; 1 × 40 mm gun; 3 × 20 mm cannons; 2 × rocket launchers; 4 × depth charge throwers; 2 × depth charge tracks

USS PC-565 was a PC-461-class submarine chaser built for the United States Navy during World War II. She was later renamed Gilmer (PC-565) but never saw active service under that name.

== Career ==
PC-565 was laid down by Brown Shipbuilding Company in Houston, Texas on 14 August 1941 and launched on 27 February 1942, sponsored by Miss Jacqueline B. Perry. USS PC-565 was commissioned on 25 May 1942.

After shakedown off Florida, PC-565 engaged in anti-submarine warfare training, then performed convoy escort and patrol duty in the Gulf of Mexico and Caribbean.

On 2 June, while escorting a southbound convoy from New York to Cuba the ship obtained an underwater sound contact and immediately attacked. After PC-565 dropped a depth charge barrage the German submarine U-521 surfaced to be met with 20 mm gunfire. Several hits were scored, and the enemy U-boat went under only to be met with another depth charge barrage. Large oil slicks and debris resulted, proving the destruction of the German U-boat. The only survivor of the 52 men aboard, Captain Klaus Bargsten, was rescued by PC-565 and his testimony substantiated PC-565's victory.

Departing New York on 25 March 1944, PC-565 sailed to England where she joined the amphibious forces in preparation for the D-Day landings. On 4 June she sailed from England arriving off the Normandy beaches 2 days later. There she performed ASW patrols, antiaircraft defense, and shuttle control duties.

Throughout the rest of the war, PC-565 remained in Europe on escort and patrol missions in the North Sea-English Channel area. Departing Bremerhaven 4 October 1945, the submarine chaser steamed for the United States, arriving Norfolk on the 22nd. Two months later she arrived at Green Cove Springs, Fla. and was decommissioned on 26 April 1946, joining the Atlantic Reserve Fleet. PC-565 was renamed Gilmer on 15 February 1956. She was stricken from the Navy List 1 July 1960, and sold to Venezuela as Alcatras.

== Honors and awards ==
PC-565 received two battle stars during World War II service.
