= Kühren =

- Municipality
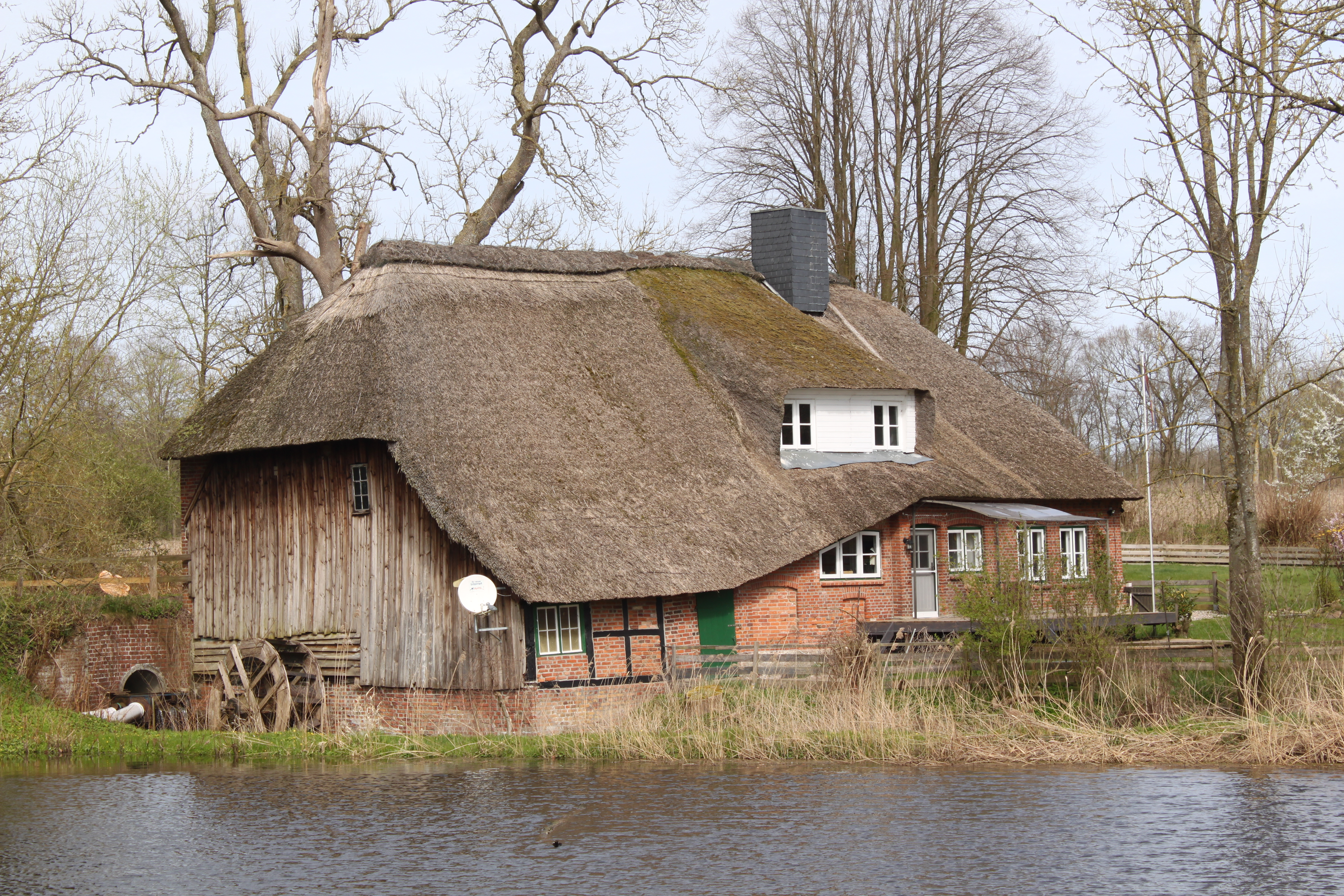
- Historic watermill in Kühren

- Coat of arms

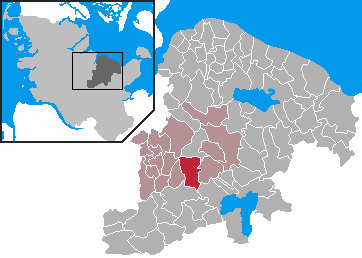
- Location of Kühren within Plön district
- Interactive map of Kühren
- Location within Germany Location within Schleswig-Holstein
- Coordinates: 54°12′4″N 10°15′41″E
- Country: Germany
- State: Schleswig-Holstein
- District: Plön
- Municipal assoc.: Preetz-Land

Government
  - Mayor: Friedrich von Klinggräff

Area
  - Total: 16.81 km^{2} (6.49 sq mi)
- Elevation: 21 m (69 ft)

Population (2025-12-31)
  - Total: 562
  - Density: 33.4/km^{2} (86.6/sq mi)
- Time zone: UTC+01:00 (CET)
  - Summer (DST): UTC+02:00 (CEST)
- Postal codes: 24211
- Dialling codes: 04342
- Vehicle registration: PLÖ
- Website: www.amtpreetzland.de

Kühren is a municipality in the district of Plön, in Schleswig-Holstein, Germany.
