= SS Antinous (1920) =

American steam cargo ship

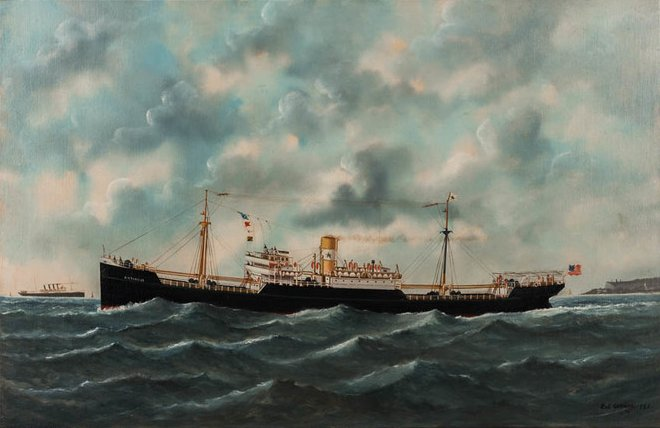
- Antinous

History

United States
- Name: Antinous
- Namesake: Antinous
- Owner: USSB (1920–1931); Waterman Steamship Corp. (1931–1942)
- Operator: Green Star Line (July 1920–June 1921); J. W. Elwell & Co (July–December 1921); Waterman Steamship Corp. (December 1921–1942)
- Ordered: 20 September 1918
- Builder: Guy M. Standifer Construction Co., Vancouver
- Cost: US$1,820,000
- Yard number: 14
- Launched: 22 June 1920
- Sponsored by: Mrs. Ellis Lewis Garretson
- Commissioned: 27 July 1920
- Maiden voyage: 14 August 1920
- Home port: Portland (1920–1931); Mobile (1931–1942)
- Identification: US Official Number 220352; Call sign MBCL (1920–1933); Call sign KDAX (1934–1942)
- Fate: Sunk, 24 September 1942

General characteristics
- Type: Design 1015 ship
- Tonnage: 6,094 GRT (1920–1933); 6,034 GRT(1934–1942); 3,816 NRT(1920–1933); 3,775 NRT(1934–1942); 9,604 DWT
- Length: 401.4 ft (122.3 m)
- Beam: 53.2 ft (16.2 m)
- Draft: 27 ft 2 3/4 in (8.299 m) (loaded)
- Depth: 31.9 ft (9.7 m)
- Installed power: 552 Nhp, 2,500 ihp
- Propulsion: Llewellyn Iron Works 3-cylinder triple expansion (1919–1933); General Electric steam turbine, double reduction geared to one screw (1934–1942)
- Speed: 11 knots (13 mph; 20 km/h)
- Armament: During WWII; 1 × 4 in (102 mm) naval gun; 4 × .50 cal (12.7mm) machine guns; 2 × .30 cal (7.62 mm) machine guns

Antinous was a Design 1015 ship steam cargo ship built in 1919–1920 by Guy M. Standifer Construction Company of Vancouver for the United States Shipping Board as part of the wartime shipbuilding program of the Emergency Fleet Corporation (EFC) to restore the nation's Merchant Marine. The vessel was chiefly employed on the Gulf to Europe routes throughout her career. In September 1942, while on a passage to British Guiana to load her cargo, she was torpedoed and sunk by German submarines operating at the time in the Caribbean.

== Design and construction ==
After the United States entry into World War I, a large shipbuilding program was undertaken to restore and enhance shipping capabilities both of the United States and their Allies. As part of this program, EFC placed orders with nation's shipyards for a large number of vessels of standard designs. Design 1015 cargo ship was a standard cargo freighter of approximately 9,400 tons deadweight designed by Moore Shipbuilding Co. and adopted by USSB.

Antinous was part of the order for five additional vessels placed by USSB with Guy M. Standifer Construction Co. on 30 September 1918. Due to overabundance of cargo ships being constructed and lack of tanker vessels being built, this contract was unilaterally suspended by USSB on 11 February 1919. After prolonged negotiations between G. M. Standifer Company and the Shipping Board about the amount of compensation, the Fleet Corporation formally cancelled the contract on 1 November 1919 and two days later the shipbuilder signed a new contract with Nafra Company, an affiliate of the newly formed Green Star Steamship Corporation, to construct five vessels nearly identical to those cancelled by USSB. Due to rapid expansion which involved acquisition of more than a dozen ships in a matter of several months, the ship operator incurred indebtedness of nearly US$40,000,000 running into financial problems and becoming delinquent on their payments in February 1920. After further negotiations, all five vessels were paid off by the EFC and allocated to Green Star Line to operate on their trade routes at the end of July 1920. Antinous was the fourth of these vessels and was launched on 22 June 1920 (yard number 14), with Mrs. Ellis Lewis Garretson of Tacoma, wife of the deputy Imperial Potentate of the Shriners, being the sponsor.

The ship had two main decks as well as forecastle and poop deck and was built on the Isherwood principle of longitudinal framing providing extra strength to the body of the vessel. The freighter had five main holds and also possessed all the modern machinery for quick loading and unloading of cargo from five large hatches, including ten winches and a large number of derricks. She was also equipped with wireless apparatus, had submarine signal system installed and had electrical lights installed along the decks.

As built, the ship was 401.4 feet (122.3 m) long (between perpendiculars) and 53.2 feet (16.2 m) abeam, a depth of 31.9 feet (9.7 m). Antinous was originally assessed at 6,094 GRT and 3,816 NRT and had deadweight tonnage of approximately 9,604. The vessel had a steel hull with double bottom throughout with exception of her machine compartment, and a single 2,500 ihp triple expansion steam engine, with cylinders of 24 1/2-inch (62 cm), 41 1/2-inch (105 cm) and 72-inch (180 cm) diameter with a 48-inch (120 cm) stroke, that drove a single screw propeller and moved the ship at up to 11 knots (13 mph; 20 km/h). The steam for the engine was supplied by three single-ended Scotch marine boilers fitted for oil fuel.

The sea trials were held on July 22 during which the steamer performed satisfactorily and was handed over to Green Star Line upon their completion.

== Operational history ==
Following delivery to her operator, Antinous sailed from Portland on 27 July 1920 to Prescott to load part cargo of lumber destined for United Kingdom. Over the next two weeks she visited various ports around the Puget Sound such as Bellingham, Mukilteo and Vancouver to complete her cargo of about 5,000,000 feet of railroad ties. She sailed on her maiden trip from Vancouver on August 14 bound for Southampton. However, on August 16 while travelling through the Strait of Juan de Fuca she suddenly developed a list to starboard side followed by a 10° list to her port side forcing her to call at Port Townsend on August 16 to rectify the problem. There she was ordered to discharge about 100,000 feet of ties from her deckload cargo reducing her total load down to 4,798,000 feet. The freighter then continued on via San Pedro and the Panama Canal to her destination. She departed England on October 25 and arrived at New York on November 8, thus successfully completing her maiden voyage. From New York the steamer proceeded to Norfolk where she took on board 7,689 tons of coal and departed for Le Havre on November 19. The steamer made one more trip to England with coal in 1921 before being allocated to the Waterman Steamship Corporation in December 1921 to serve on their trade routes from the Gulf Coast to England. In late February and early March 1922 the vessel took on a cargo of wheat at New Orleans, continued on to Pensacola where she embarked about 500,000 feet of lumber and 100 barrels of turpentine and then sailed for Mobile to finish loading. In the morning of 8 March 1922 while entering the Mobile Bay, Antinous and another USSB vessel, SS Bayou Chico, leaving Mobile collided just outside the river mouth. Bayou Chico had her port bow completely demolished and was taking on water fast and had to be beached in order to prevent sinking. Antinous was taken by a tug to a ship anchorage where she was examined and found to have only suffered minor damage to her bow. Despite the accident, Antinous managed to leave on her trip after loading the remainder of the cargo in Mobile.

Antinous continued to be operated by the Waterman Steamship Corp. for the next eight years transporting cargo from a variety of Southern ports of the United States such as Mobile, New Orleans, Pensacola and Gulfport to ports in the United Kingdom and Europe. During her earlier years of service the vast majority of cargo was routed to London and consisted mostly of lumber, cotton, gum rosin and related products. For example, in June 1924 she cleared from Mobile for England having on board 1,301,564 feet of lumber and 291,500 pounds of gum rosin.

In the second half of 1923, early part of 1924 she made several trips on behalf of Tampa Inter-Ocean Steamship Company. For example, in August she delivered a cargo consisting of 4,000 tons of phosphates and other merchandise from Florida to Hamburg in Germany and returned on October 1 loaded with things such as bone meal, salt, kyanite and newspapers.

After USSB ordered consolidation of lines conducted in 1924, Waterman Steamship Corp. took over Mobile Oceanic Line in July 1924. Subsequently, a fast growing service was established from Gulf ports to Germany, and Antinous was shifted to this route in mid-1925 and began carrying cargo to Rotterdam and German ports of Bremen and Hamburg. In September 1925 she cleared from Gulfport carrying 2,107,680 pounds of cottonseed cake in addition to 388,165 feet of lumber before embarking extra cargo at Mobile and Pensacola. From 1927 and on she would also stop at Tampa to take on occasional cargoes of phosphates destined for Europe. For example, in February 1928 she loaded 3,158 tons of phosphate rock at Tampa before continuing on to load extra cargo elsewhere.

During one of her regular trips in September 1927 Antinous, while on her way to London, Rotterdam and Antwerp with her usual cargo of lumber and general merchandise, ran into a hurricane of the East Coast. The steamer had to fight through the storm for three days struggling against the winds topping 110 miles per hour (180 km/h). On 27 September 1927 three crew members were washed overboard when a giant wave swept over the ship. The vessel finally arrived at her destination on October 13, six days overdue, with considerable damage about her decks with most of her deckload cargo of timber gone.

On 16 July 1930 the Shipping Board authorized the sale of Mobile Oceanic Line and all assets including 14 vessels already operating by the line to the Waterman Steamship Corp. Under the terms of the sale the shipowner had to invest into either acquiring new vessels or refurbishing the ships acquired through the purchase. They also had to maintain a guaranteed operation between Mobile and other Gulf ports and the United Kingdom and Continental Europe for at least five years. However, due to ongoing negotiations with the Post Office on the mail contract the sale has not been finalized at the time, and the ships continued to be operated by the Waterman Steamship Corp. under the supervision of the Merchant Fleet Corporation. On 14 September 1931 the sale of the vessels and the Mobile Oceanic Line was finalized, and the line and the ships, including Antinous, were formally transferred to Waterman Steamship Corp. for US$1,108,080, with Antinous being sold for US$86,436.

On 5 January 1931 while entering Hamburg harbor during a heavy squall, Antinous struck the stern of moored British steamer SS British Ardour with both vessels suffering minor damage. Antinous was subsequently repaired at Bruce Dry Dock Co. at Pensacola upon her arrival from Europe.

In the early part of 1934 Waterman Steamship Corp. applied for reconstruction loans at USSB to recondition its existing fleet of steamers. On 10 July 1934 a loan not to exceed US$83,675 was formally approved by the USSB and Antinous was placed in the drydock of Todd Dry Dock & Construction Co. in Mobile for upgrade and reconditioning. As part of the work the vessel steam engine was replaced by a General Electric steam turbine roughly providing the same power. After completing the updates, the ship had been reassessed at 6,034 GRT and 3,775 NRT and returned to service in November 1934. The ship's service speed also increased after the upgrades as was evidenced by one of her trips in early 1935 when she averaged 13.87 knots (15.96 mph; 25.69 km/h) on her trans-Atlantic journey.

In 1935 Antinous was reassigned to Gulf to England route carrying phosphates, lumber and general cargo to British ports of Manchester, Glasgow and Liverpool. Around 1938 she also started serving West Indies on her outward journeys. The steamer continued serving this general route until the onset of World War II. On 1 September 1939 Antinous was in Tampa scheduled to load another cargo of phosphates and general merchandise for delivery to United Kingdom, but the loading was suspended until further notice due to start of hostilities and she departed in ballast for Mobile on September 3. Eventually, Waterman Steamship Corp. managed to redirect most of their vessels to operate on the Pacific, and Antinous returned to Tampa for loading on 2 October 1939 and cleared from port next day loaded with 8,063 tons of phosphates bound for Kobe. On her return trip she passed through the Panama Canal on 15–16 January 1940 carrying 8,500 tons of raw sugar loaded in the Philippines for delivery to New Orleans.

On her second trip to the Far East Antinous was carrying a cargo consisting of cotton and scrap iron destined for Osaka. The vessel called at Honolulu for bunkers on 13 March 1940 and departed next day for her destination. Ten days later a fire was discovered in hold No. 2 but the crew managed to keep it under control. Before the water from fire fighting could be pumped out, she ran into a strong gale which washed away her deckload cargo and opened two-foot crack on her starboard bow below the waterline resulting in her No. 1 hold being flooded. Two vessels, SS Bering and SS Admiral Halstead, responded to Antinous's call for help, however, the stricken vessel managed to fight through a series of gales without any further damage, and by April 1 was able to resume her course to Japan, albeit at a slower speed. She then ran into another gale and the crew had to pour 70 barrels of fuel oil overboard in an attempt to calm the seas. After reaching Kobe she underwent emergency repairs, then stopped at Chinese and Philippine ports and from there started out on her return trip via the Mediterranean. Soon after she reached the Suez Canal, Italy had entered the war and under the terms of Neutrality Act she had to turn around and sail all around Eastern Coast of Africa, touching at Cape Town before finally reaching Mobile on 21 August 1940.

Antinuous made one more trip to the Far East before being shifted to Australia and New Zealand service. In May 1941 she was reassigned to carry supplies to the British troops fighting in North Africa. In the morning of 2 June 1941 while on her first voyage to Suez via Cape Town she encountered a lifeboat carrying twenty one survivors from British steamer SS Tewkesbury which was sunk on May 21. The lifeboat and all its occupants were taken aboard the steamer and safely landed at Cape Town on June 13. After visiting a number of ports in India and East Indies, the steamer arrived at New York on 3 December 1941 via Honolulu and the Panama Canal concluding her last peacetime trip.

Following United States entry into World War II the ship was allocated for convoy duty and was defensively armed. In the early part of 1942 Antinous made one trip to South America returning to New Orleans in the beginning of March. After loading in Gulf ports, she proceeded to New York and from there to Halifax in late April 1942. She departed Halifax laden with general cargo as part of convoy SC 84 on 14 May 1942 for United Kingdom where she were to receive her orders. The convoy arrived without any incidents at Liverpool on May 29 and Antinous remained berthed in port until late July awaiting her orders.

=== Sinking ===
Antinous departed from Clyde on 6 August 1942 as part of convoy ON 119 successfully arriving at New York on August 20. A week later she proceeded to Guantanamo as part of convoy NG-300 reaching her destination on September 3. The freighter then became a part of convoy GAT-2 leaving Cuba on the same day and arriving at Trinidad on September 10. From there she proceeded to Paramaribo as part of convoy TRIN-8 before returning to Trinidad on September 19 with a full load of bauxite ore. After discharging most of her cargo, she then sailed from Trinidad on September 22 carrying 565 tons of bauxite ore as ballast being part of convoy TRIN-12. After the convoy was dispersed south of Trinidad, she continued on independently to Georgetown to load another cargo of bauxite. The freighter was under command of captain Hamilton Powell and had a crew of eight officers, twenty seven men and sixteen armed guards.

At about 04:20 local time on 23 September 1942 Antinous was spotted by a lookout from U-515 at a distance of approximately 7 nautical miles (13 km). U-515 decided to close in and commence attack on the surface with her last remaining torpedo. At approximately 05:03, after closing in to within 1,000 m, one torpedo was fired at the target by the submarine. At about the same time the submarine's conning tower was spotted by a lookout from Antinous, and almost immediately a torpedo wake was noticed about 100 yards away on the port side, however, due to very short distance no evasive action could be taken by the freighter's crew to avoid being hit. Antinous was struck on her port side close to her No. 2 hold in an approximate position 08°58′N 59°33′W. The resulting explosion opened a fourteen by eighteen feet wide hole in the hull and the vessel immediately started to take on water. The gun crew fired seven shots from the vessel's 4-inch stern gun forcing U-515 to crash dive. The submarine resurfaced at 05:20 about 3,500 meters distant and observed the crew abandoning the ship in three lifeboats and two rafts. By this time, Antinous was heavily down by the bow with her rudder and propellers protruding from the water and the ship listing about 20°. With arriving sunrise and potential danger from the air the submarine departed the area without trying to sink the vessel with her cannon. At about 08:00 the ship was reboarded by a volunteer crew but the engines could not be restarted.

The next day two tugs arrived at the scene, and at approximately 14:00, after an entire crew reboarded the stricken steamer, Antinous was taken in tow by rescue tug Zwarte Zee with tug Busy assisting. After towing the ship for about five miles, the tugs stopped to adjust the towing cable. At the same time U-512 which was shadowing the ship for some time fired one torpedo at the idle steamer striking her around hold No.1. Antinous started settling immediately, and fifteen minutes later the crew yet again had to abandon the sinking ship. Antinous finally sank by the bow at about 15:10 in an approximate position 09°22′N 60°09′W.
