= Rüdiger Schmidt-Grépály =

German cultural manager

Rüdiger Schmidt-Grépály (born 13 July 1952 in Bad Oldesloe, Schleswig-Holstein) is a German cultural manager and Director of the Kolleg Friedrich Nietzsche at the Klassik Stiftung Weimar.

== Research and academic career ==
After leaving school in 1972, he studied philosophy, politics and literature in Kiel, Freiburg im Breisgau and Marburg until 1980. In 1980, he successfully completed a doctorate on the early work of Friedrich Nietzsche under the direction of Hans Heinz Holz, Gert Mattenklott and Katharina Kanthack. From 1983 to 1985, holding grants from the German Academic Exchange Service and the Italian foreign ministry, he worked in Florence with Mazzino Montinari, who was editing the first Nietzsche edition free of falsifications, based on the studies he had been carrying out in Weimar since the 1960s.

Until 1997, Schmidt-Grépály lectured in philosophy at the Universities of Florence, Kiel, Oldenburg and Bremen, then from 1998 at Jena and the Bauhaus University, Weimar. From 1989 to 1995 he was the Philosophical Director of the "Karl Jaspers Vorlesungen zu Fragen der Zeit" at the University of Oldenburg under Rudolf zur Lippe. In 1994 Schmidt-Grépály worked at Theater Bremen together with the pioneer of German dance theatre, Johannes Kresnik. He occasionally presented the radio programme "Doppelkopf" on hr2 for Hessischer Rundfunk in conversation with guests such as Nike Wagner, Almos Csongár and Ágnes Heller. In 1999 Schmidt-Grépály organised a Nietzsche evening in Brussels with the title "Ich bin kein Mensch, ich bin Dynamit" (Friedrich Nietzsche) as one of the official contributions by the State of Thuringia to celebrating the German Presidency of the European Union. Involved in the Nietzsche event were the actors Silvia Fink and Harald Schwaiger of the Deutsches Nationaltheater Weimar, and Luise Härtwig, alumna of the Musikgymnasium Weimar. The play was subsequently performed in Weimar, Naumburg, Munich, Lyon and elsewhere.

== Founding of the Kolleg Friedrich Nietzsche ==
In 1992, with the idea of turning the Villa Silberblick, the legendary former Nietzsche Archive, into a venue for free spirits in Nietzsche's sense, Schmidt-Grépály came to Weimar. After working for the Stiftung Weimarer Klassik from 1993 to 1999 first as a freelance collaborator, in October 1999 Schmidt-Grépály was appointed Director of the Kolleg Friedrich Nietzsche. For his initiative in founding and building up the Kolleg he was awarded the "Premio Internazionale Federico Nietzsche" by the "Associazione Internazionale di Studi e Ricerche Federico Nietzsche" (Palermo, Italy) in 2002. Shortly after celebrating its 10th anniversary, the Kolleg was nominated Weimar's first "Ort der Vielfalt" (Place of Diversity) in January 2012.

== Bibliography ==
- Nietzsches Nietzsche. Werke letzter Hand. Ed. Rüdiger Schmidt-Grépály. L.S.D., Göttingen 2013. (announced) (in German)
- Nietzsche für Anfänger: Also sprach Zarathustra. Eine Lese-Einführung von Rüdiger Schmidt und Cord Spreckelsen. 8th edn. dtv, Munich 2010, ISBN 978-3-423-30124-4 (trans. into Italian and Korean)
- Auf Nietzsches Balkon. Philosophische Beiträge aus der Villa Silberblick. Ed. Rüdiger Schmidt-Grépály. Bauhaus-Universität, Weimar 2009, ISBN 978-3-86068-395-8. (Series: Schriften aus dem Kolleg Friedrich Nietzsche) (in German)
- Introduction (with Cord Spreckelsen) to the audiobook Nietzsche für Anfänger: Also sprach Zarathustra read by Martin Umbach. Komplett Media Verlag, Grünwald 2008. (in German)
- Friedrich Nietzsche: Schreibmaschinentexte. Complete edition. Facsimiles and critical commentary. Edited from the Nachlass by Stephan Günzel and Rüdiger Schmidt-Grépály. Verlag der Bauhaus Universität, Weimar 2002, ISBN 3-86068-396-9. (in German)
- Nietzsche im Christentum. Theologische Perspektiven nach Nietzsches Proklamation des Todes Gottes. Ed. Daniel Mourkojannis and Rüdiger Schmidt-Grépály. Schwabe, Basel 2004, ISBN 3-7965-1922-9. (Series: Beiträge zu Friedrich Nietzsche) (in German)
- Nietzsche im Exil. Übergänge in gegenwärtiges Denken. Ed. Steffen Dietzsch and Rüdiger Schmidt-Grépály. Hermann Böhlaus Nachfolger, Weimar 2001, ISBN 3-7400-1157-2. (in German)
- Nietzsches Labyrinthe. Leitmotive seines Denkens. (with Éva Grépály). In: Gerhard Schweppenhäuser and Jörg H. Gleiter (eds.): Nietzsches Labyrinthe. Perspektiven zur Ästhetik, Ethik und Kulturphilosophie. Philosophische Diskurse 4. Verlag der Bauhaus-Universität, Weimar 2001. (in German)
- Die verratenen Gedanken / Wie Nietzsche erst gefälscht und dann rekonstruiert wurde. In: Süddeutsche Zeitung. 24 November 2001. (in German)
- Ein Text ohne Ende für den Denkenden. Studien zu Nietzsche. 2nd, expanded edition. In: Athenäums Monografien / Philosophie. Vol. 260. Athenäum Verlag, Frankfurt am Main 1989, ISBN 3-610-09241-6. (in German)
- Nietzsche für Anfänger: Ecce homo. A Primer by Rüdiger Schmidt and Cord Spreckelsen. dtv, Munich 2000, ISBN 3-423-30734-X. (in German)
- Nietzsche. Text - Kontext. Ed. Djavid Salehi and Rüdiger Schmidt-Grépály. Verlag der Bauhaus-Universität, Weimar 2000, ISBN 3-86068-134-6. (in German)
- Zum 100. Todestag von Friedrich Nietzsche. In: Thüringer Museumshefte. Ed. Museumsverband Thüringen v.V., 9/2, 2000, pp. 93ff. (in German)
- Nietzsche denken. In: Weimarer Kulturjournal. 9/10, Weimar 2000, p. 2. (in German)
- Philosophischer Taschenkalender - Jahrbuch zum Streit der Fakultäten. 2 vols. Ed. Rüdiger Schmidt and Bettina Wahrig-Schmidt. Luciferlag, Lübeck 1992. (in German)
- Zarathustras Wege. Text accompanying Friedrich Nietzsche: Also sprach Zarathustra. Read by Peter Wapenski. Der Hörverlag, Munich 2000. (in German)
