= USS Ellis (DD-154) =

Wickes-class destroyer

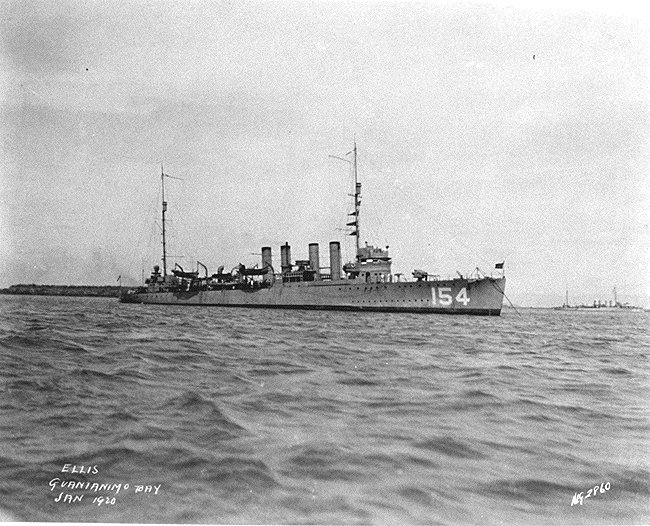
- USS Ellis in Guantanamo Bay, Cuba in January 1920

History

United States
- Name: Ellis
- Namesake: George Henry Ellis
- Builder: William Cramp & Sons, Philadelphia
- Yard number: 469
- Laid down: 8 July 1918
- Launched: 30 November 1918
- Commissioned: 7 June 1919
- Decommissioned: 17 June 1922
- Recommissioned: 1 May 1930
- Decommissioned: 16 December 1936
- Recommissioned: 16 October 1939
- Decommissioned: 31 October 1945
- Stricken: 16 November 1945
- Fate: Sold for scrapping, 17 July 1947

General characteristics
- Class & type: Wickes-class destroyer
- Displacement: 1,060 tons
- Length: 314 ft 5 in (95.8 m)
- Beam: 31 ft 8 in (9.7 m)
- Draft: 8 ft 8 in (2.6 m)
- Speed: 35 knots (65 km/h)
- Complement: 113 officers and enlisted
- Armament: 4 × 4 in (102 mm) guns; 2 × 3 in (76 mm) guns; 12 × 21 in (533 mm) torpedo tubes; 1 × depth charge projector; 2 × depth charge tracks

USS Ellis (DD–154) was a Wickes-class destroyer in the United States Navy during World War II. She was reclassified AG-115 on 30 June 1945. She was named for Chief Yeoman George Henry Ellis.

Ellis was launched on 30 November 1918 by William Cramp & Sons, Philadelphia, sponsored by Mrs. E. T. Stotesbury. The destroyer was commissioned on 7 June 1919.

== Service history ==
Ellis's first cruise, between 16 June and 15 August 1919, was to the Black Sea, carrying United States Food Administration officials for famine relief work, and British and American military officers between Constantinople, Turkey; Varna, Bulgaria; and Batum, Georgia. She returned to a year of exercises on the east coast and in the Caribbean Sea. From 29 September 1920 to 16 March 1921 she was in reserve at Charleston. She sailed north to fire test torpedoes off Newport, lay again at Charleston from October 1921 through February 1922. On 27 February she entered Philadelphia Navy Yard, where she was out of commission from 17 June 1922 to 1 May 1930.

Ellis served with the Scouting Fleet along the east coast, off Panama and Cuba, and from March 1932 through October in exercises between San Diego and San Francisco. She was in rotating reserve at Norfolk and Boston in 1932 and 1933. In April 1933, she searched for Akron, and found wreckage off the New Jersey coast. Based on New York through the summer of 1933, she escorted the Presidential yacht along the New England coast to Campobello, New Brunswick, where on 1 July she embarked President Franklin D. Roosevelt and his party, transferring them to the cruiser Indianapolis. She escorted Indianapolis to Annapolis, where the president again visited Ellis on 4 July. She also trained members of the Naval Reserve before departing New York 8 September for Key West.

The next year, Ellis cruised to Cuba, again escorted the president, this time in a private yacht, and on 24 October 1934 passed through the Panama Canal to be based on San Diego. Training operations took her to Alaska and Hawaii during the next year and a half, and on 7 June 1936 she returned to Miami for east coast reserve training duty until decommissioned at Philadelphia on 16 December 1936.

=== World War II ===
Ellis was recommissioned on 16 October 1939, and from her bases at Charleston and Norfolk, patrolled the east coast concentrating on anti-submarine warfare. Between 22 June and 21 July 1941, she sailed from Newport to escort transports carrying the first Marines to the occupation of Iceland, and a month later sailed to base at Naval Station Argentia, Newfoundland for escort duty to Iceland and to mid-ocean rendezvous.

Returning at intervals to Boston for replenishment and repairs, she served thus until March 1942, when her operations were extended to the Virgin Islands. She escorted coastal convoys, on 15 July 1942 attacking a submarine off Cape Hatteras. From October 1942, she also guarded convoy routes between Trinidad and Brazil, and in March 1943 was assigned to transatlantic convoys.

On 12 October 1942, Ellis picked up the only German survivor of U-512, Matrosengefreiter Franz Machen who had been floating on a raft for ten days, and held him in captivity.

Between 20 March 1943 and 25 June, Ellis escorted two top priority tanker convoys with Aruba oil for North Africa, then troop transports to Derry. From August to November, she twice guarded escort carriers ferrying Army planes to Ireland and North Africa. Ellis escorted Abraham Lincoln to the Azores in January 1944, and while on patrol there rescued two downed British pilots. Returning to North African convoy duty, Ellis made two voyages from the east coast to Casablanca, Algiers, and Bizerte between February and June. On 11 May, off Bizerte, she was attacked by four bombers, three of which she had a hand in shooting down, and drove the fourth away.

The remainder of the war, Ellis guarded carriers training pilots, experimented with torpedo aircraft, twice made escort voyages to Recife, Brazil. She was decommissioned at Norfolk on 31 October 1945 and sold on 20 June 1947.

== Convoys escorted ==
Convoy	Escort Group	Dates	Notes
	task force 19	1–7 July 1941	occupation of Iceland prior to US declaration of war
HX 150		17–25 Sept 1941	from Newfoundland to Iceland prior to US declaration of war
ON 22		7–15 Oct 1941	from Iceland to Newfoundland prior to US declaration of war
HX 157		30 Oct-8 Nov 1941	from Newfoundland to Iceland prior to US declaration of war
ON 35		15–27 Nov 1941	from Iceland to Newfoundland prior to US declaration of war
HX 164		10–19 Dec 1941	from Newfoundland to Iceland
ON 49		27 Dec 1941 – 5 Jan 1942	from Iceland to Newfoundland
HX 169		10 Jan 1942	from Newfoundland to Iceland
HX 170		16–17 Jan 1942	from Newfoundland to Iceland

== Awards ==
Ellis received one battle star for World War II service.
