= Rastorf =

- Municipality
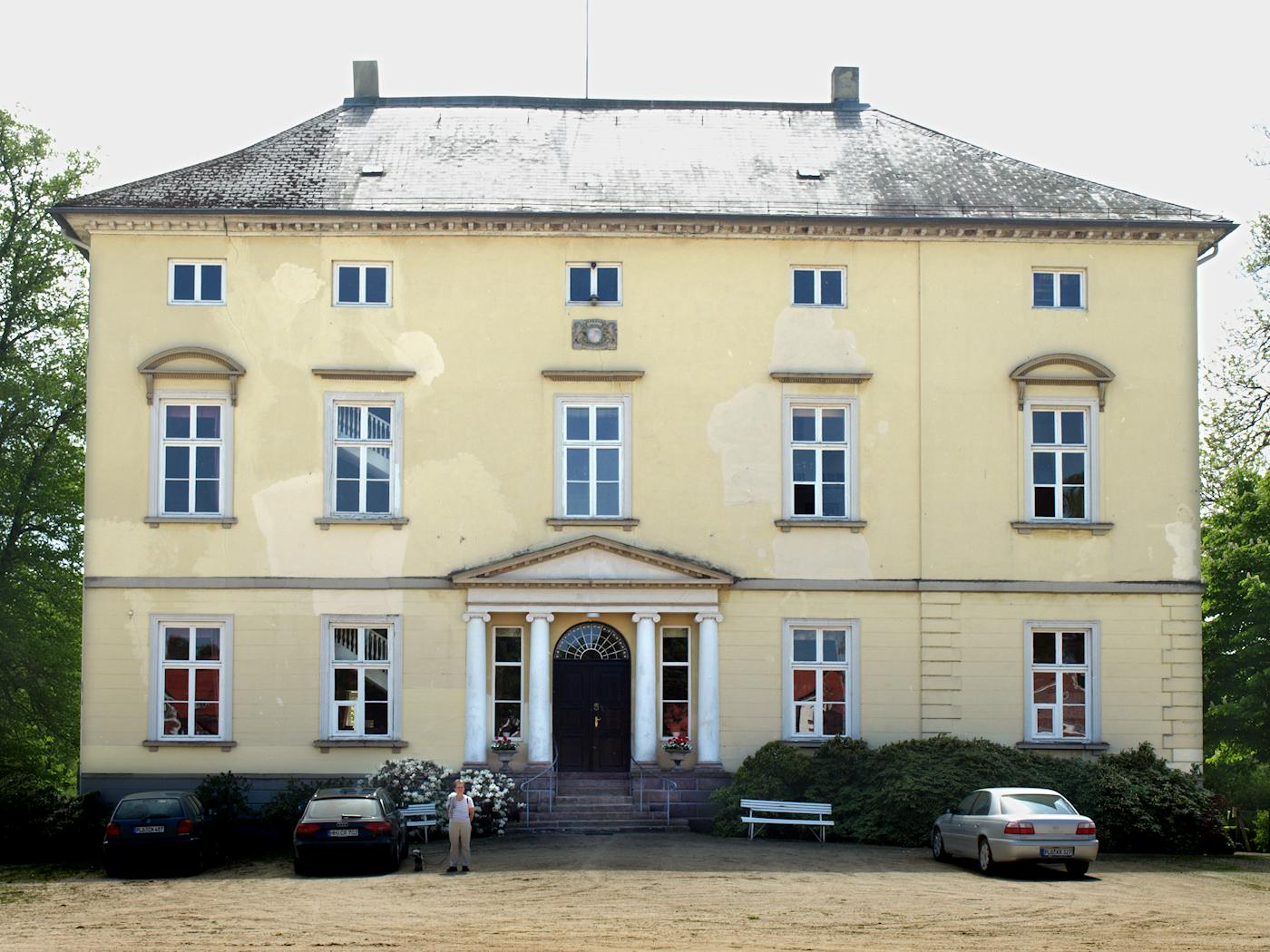
- Gut Rastorf

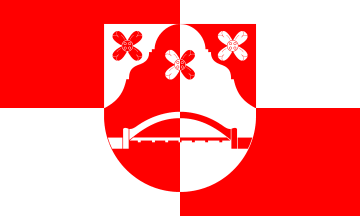
- Flag Coat of arms

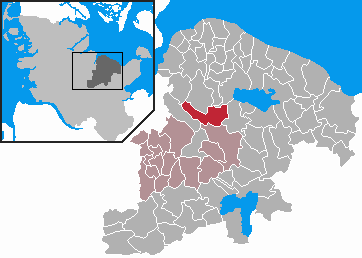
- Location of Rastorf within Plön district
- Interactive map of Rastorf
- Location within Germany Location within Schleswig-Holstein
- Coordinates: 54°16′N 10°16′E
- Country: Germany
- State: Schleswig-Holstein
- District: Plön
- Municipal assoc.: Preetz-Land

Government
  - Mayor: Wilfried Dibbern

Area
  - Total: 20.02 km^{2} (7.73 sq mi)
- Elevation: 27 m (89 ft)

Population (2025-12-31)
  - Total: 774
  - Density: 38.7/km^{2} (100/sq mi)
- Time zone: UTC+01:00 (CET)
  - Summer (DST): UTC+02:00 (CEST)
- Postal codes: 24211
- Dialling codes: 04342
- Vehicle registration: PLÖ
- Website: www.amtpreetzland.de

Rastorf is a municipality in the district of Plön, in Schleswig-Holstein, Germany.

Rastorf is on the highway 202 about a kilometer east of Raisdorf. The white bridge over the Schwentine is one of the landmarks of the community.
