= Wahlstorf, Schleswig-Holstein =

Wahlstorf
- Municipality
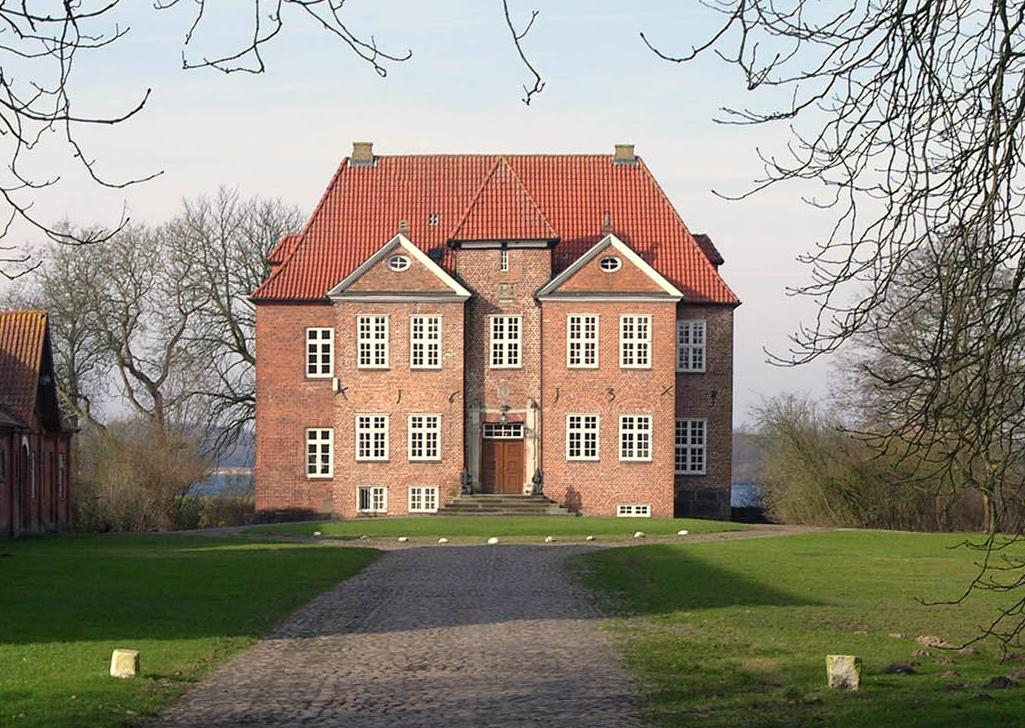
- Gut Wahlstorf

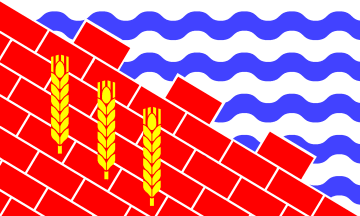
- Flag Coat of arms

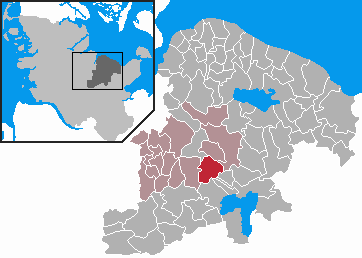
- Location of Wahlstorf within Plön district
- Interactive map of Wahlstorf
- Location within Germany Location within Schleswig-Holstein
- Coordinates: 54°11′49″N 10°18′37″E
- Country: Germany
- State: Schleswig-Holstein
- District: Plön
- Municipal assoc.: Preetz-Land
- Subdivisions: 3

Government
  - Mayor: Harald Ahrens (CDU)

Area
  - Total: 14.83 km^{2} (5.73 sq mi)
- Elevation: 22 m (72 ft)

Population (2025-12-31)
  - Total: 429
  - Density: 28.9/km^{2} (74.9/sq mi)
- Time zone: UTC+01:00 (CET)
  - Summer (DST): UTC+02:00 (CEST)
- Postal codes: 24211
- Dialling codes: 04342
- Vehicle registration: PLÖ
- Website: www.amtpreetzland.de

Wahlstorf is a village and municipality in the district (in German Kreis) of Plön, in Schleswig-Holstein, Germany. It is part of the Amt Preetz-Land.
