= Postfeld =

- Municipality
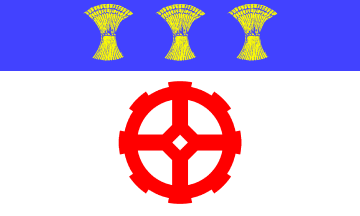
- Flag Coat of arms

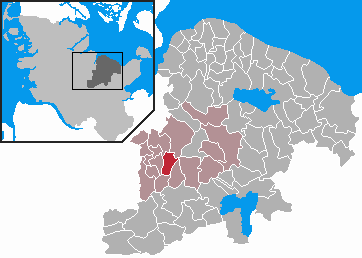
- Location of Postfeld within Plön district
- Interactive map of Postfeld
- Location within Germany Location within Schleswig-Holstein
- Coordinates: 54°13′N 10°13′E
- Country: Germany
- State: Schleswig-Holstein
- District: Plön
- Municipal assoc.: Preetz-Land

Government
  - Mayor: Günter Kalin (SPD)

Area
  - Total: 8.33 km^{2} (3.22 sq mi)
- Elevation: 25 m (82 ft)

Population (2025-12-31)
  - Total: 423
  - Density: 50.8/km^{2} (132/sq mi)
- Time zone: UTC+01:00 (CET)
  - Summer (DST): UTC+02:00 (CEST)
- Postal codes: 24211
- Dialling codes: 04342
- Vehicle registration: PLÖ
- Website: www.postfeld.de

Postfeld is a municipality in the district of Plön, in Schleswig-Holstein, Germany.
