= German submarine U-512 =

German World War II submarine

Coordinates: 6°50′N 52°25′W

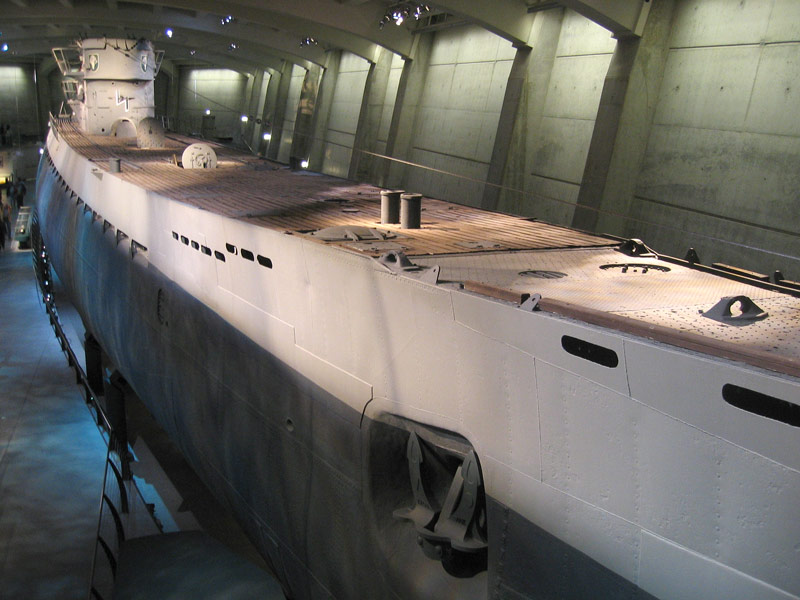
- U-505, a typical Type IXC boat

History

Nazi Germany
- Name: U-512
- Ordered: 20 October 1939
- Builder: Deutsche Werft, Hamburg
- Yard number: 308
- Laid down: 24 February 1941
- Launched: 9 October 1941
- Commissioned: 20 December 1941
- Fate: Sunk on 2 October 1942

General characteristics
- Class & type: Type IXC submarine
- Displacement: 1,120 t (1,100 long tons) surfaced; 1,232 t (1,213 long tons) submerged
- Length: 76.76 m (251 ft 10 in) o/a; 58.75 m (192 ft 9 in) pressure hull
- Beam: 6.76 m (22 ft 2 in) o/a; 4.40 m (14 ft 5 in) pressure hull
- Height: 9.60 m (31 ft 6 in)
- Draught: 4.70 m (15 ft 5 in)
- Installed power: 4,400 PS (3,200 kW; 4,300 bhp) (diesels); 1,000 PS (740 kW; 990 shp) (electric)
- Propulsion: 2 shafts; 2 × diesel engines; 2 × electric motors
- Speed: 18.3 knots (33.9 km/h; 21.1 mph) surfaced; 7.7 knots (14.3 km/h; 8.9 mph) submerged
- Range: 13,450 nmi (24,910 km; 15,480 mi) at 10 knots (19 km/h; 12 mph) surfaced; 64 nmi (119 km; 74 mi) at 4 knots (7.4 km/h; 4.6 mph) submerged
- Test depth: 230 m (750 ft)
- Complement: 4 officers, 44 enlisted
- Armament: 6 × torpedo tubes (4 bow, 2 stern); 22 × 53.3 cm (21 in) torpedoes; 1 × 10.5 cm (4.1 in) SK C/32 deck gun (180 rounds); 1 × 3.7 cm (1.5 in) SK C/30 AA gun; 1 × twin 2 cm FlaK 30 AA guns

Service record
- Part of: 4th U-boat Flotilla; 20 December 1941 – 31 August 1942; 10th U-boat Flotilla; 1 September – 2 October 1942
- Commanders: Kptlt. Wolfgang Schultze; 20 December 1941 – 2 October 1942
- Operations: 1 patrol: 15 August – 2 October 1942
- Victories: 3 merchant ships sunk (20,619 GRT)

German submarine U-512 was a Type IXC U-boat of Nazi Germany's Kriegsmarine built for service during World War II. U-512 was built by the Deutsche Werft shipyard in Hamburg during 1941, completing in December that year.

After trials and a working up period in the Baltic Sea, U-512 carried out a single patrol off the entrance to the Caribbean Sea and off the northern coast of South America, leaving Germany in August 1942. She sank three merchant ships, before being bombed and sunk by an aircraft of the United States Army Air Forces on 2 October 1942.

== Design and construction ==
German Type IXC submarines were slightly larger than the original Type IXBs. U-512 had a displacement of 1,120 tonnes (1,100 long tons) when at the surface and 1,232 tonnes (1,213 long tons) while submerged. The U-boat had a total length of 76.76 m (251 ft 10 in), a pressure hull length of 58.75 m (192 ft 9 in), a beam of 6.76 m (22 ft 2 in), a height of 9.60 m (31 ft 6 in), and a draught of 4.70 m (15 ft 5 in). The submarine was powered by two MAN M 9 V 40/46 supercharged four-stroke, nine-cylinder diesel engines producing a total of 4,400 metric horsepower (3,240 kW; 4,340 shp) for use while surfaced, two Siemens-Schuckert 2 GU 345/34 double-acting electric motors producing a total of 1,000 shaft horsepower (1,010 PS; 750 kW) for use while submerged. She had two shafts and two 1.92 m (6 ft) propellers. The boat was capable of operating at depths of up to 230 metres (750 ft).

The submarine had a maximum surface speed of 18.3 knots (33.9 km/h; 21.1 mph) and a maximum submerged speed of 7.3 knots (13.5 km/h; 8.4 mph). When submerged, the boat could operate for 63 nautical miles (117 km; 72 mi) at 4 knots (7.4 km/h; 4.6 mph); when surfaced, she could travel 13,450 nautical miles (24,910 km; 15,480 mi) at 10 knots (19 km/h; 12 mph). U-512 was fitted with six 53.3 cm (21 in) torpedo tubes (four fitted at the bow and two at the stern), 22 torpedoes, one 10.5 cm (4.13 in) SK C/32 naval gun, 180 rounds, and a 3.7 cm (1.5 in) SK C/30 as well as a 2 cm (0.79 in) C/30 anti-aircraft gun. The boat had a complement of forty-eight.

U-512 was laid down on 24 February 1941 at Deutsche Werft's Hamburg shipyard, as Yard number 308. She was launched on 9 October 1941 and commissioned on 20 December that year.

== Service history ==
Following commissioning, U-512, under the command of Kapitänleutnant Wolfgang Schultze, son of an Admiral and previously training captain of U-17, who was described by historian Clay Blair as reckless and a heavy drinker, joined the 2nd U-boat Flotilla. U-512 was sent to the eastern Baltic for trials and workup, but was damaged during diving tests on 17 January 1942 having to put into Stettin for repair. Following completion of the repairs, sea trials were disrupted by freezing of the Baltic, and did not recommence until April. In May 1942, U-512 was damaged in a surface collision with another U-boat, and again was repaired at Stettin. After another collision during final tactical trials, this time with the freighter Morgenrot which capsized as a result, followed by more repair at Stettin, U-512 reached Kiel on 7 August 1942.

Departing from Kiel on 15 August 1942, U-512 was one of five Type IX U-boats ordered to patrol east of Trinidad. She headed into the Atlantic via the Norwegian coast and the gap between Iceland and the Faeroe Islands and then to the southwest, refuelling from the tanker submarine U-462 on the way. While passing through the Sargasso Sea, U-512 was attacked by an aircraft, with the submarine sustaining minor damage. On 8 September, U-512 attacked a freighter, but all four torpedoes fired missed their target. On 12 September 1942 (Note: 13 September according to u-boat.net.) U-512 attacked the unescorted 10,865 GRT American tanker Patrick J. Hurley. After missing with two torpedoes, U-512 attacked with her 10.5 cm deck gun and 3.7 cm anti-aircraft gun, sinking the tanker. 17 of Patrick J. Hurley's crew were killed. On 19 September, a second ship was found, the lone 3,720 GRT Spanish freighter Monte Gorbea, which was torpedoed and sunk despite her neutral status, killing 52 of the freighter's passengers and crew. On hearing of the sinking of Spanish ship, Admiral Erich Raeder, head of the Kriegsmarine, was furious, and ordered that Schultze be subject to a court-martial on return to port. U-512's final victory came on 24 September, when another American ship, the 6,034 GRT Antinous, which had been torpedoed by U-515 the day before and abandoned by her crew, was torpedoed and sunk off Venezuela.

On 2 October, U-512 was spotted on the surface in daylight off Cayenne, French Guiana by a B-18 Bolo aircraft belonging to the 99th Bombardment Group of the United States Army Air Forces. The aircraft flew low and dropped its bomb load directly on the boat, sinking the submarine. Most of the crew were killed instantly, but sixteen men trapped in the forward torpedo room survived the initial attack but were trapped in the slowly flooding forward torpedo room. Two men attempted to escape via the torpedo loading hatch, but only one, Matrosengefreiter Franz Machon, reached the surface alive. The attacking aircraft dropped a life raft and Machon was rescued by the Wickes-class destroyer USS Ellis ten days later. The remaining 51 of her crew died.

== Summary of raiding history ==
Date	Ship Name	Nationality	Tonnage (GRT)	Fate
13 September 1942	Patrick J Hurley	United States	10,865	Sunk
19 September 1942	Monte Gorbea	Spain	3,720	Sunk
24 September 1942	Antinous	United States	6,034	Sunk

== Bibliography ==
- Blair, Clay (2000). Hitler's U-Boat War: The Hunters 1939–1942. London: Cassell & Co. ISBN 0-304-35260-8.
- Busch, Rainer; Röll, Hans-Joachim (1999). German U-boat commanders of World War II : a biographical dictionary. Translated by Brooks, Geoffrey. London, Annapolis, Md: Greenhill Books, Naval Institute Press. ISBN 1-55750-186-6.
- Busch, Rainer; Röll, Hans-Joachim (1999). Deutsche U-Boot-Verluste von September 1939 bis Mai 1945 [German U-boat losses from September 1939 to May 1945]. Der U-Boot-Krieg (in German). Vol. IV. Hamburg, Berlin, Bonn: Mittler. ISBN 3-8132-0514-2.
- Gröner, Erich; Jung, Dieter; Maass, Martin (1985). Die deutschen Kriegschiffe 1815–1945: Band 3: U-Boote, Hilfskreuzer, Minenschiffe, Netzleger, Sperrbrecher (in German). Koblenz, Germany: Bernard & Grafe Verlag. ISBN 3-7637-4802-4.
- Gröner, Erich; Jung, Dieter; Maass, Martin (1991). U-boats and Mine Warfare Vessels. German Warships 1815–1945. Vol. 2. Translated by Thomas, Keith; Magowan, Rachel. London: Conway Maritime Press. ISBN 0-85177-593-4.
- Kemp, Paul (1999). U-Boats Destroyed - German Submarine Losses in the World Wars. London: Arms & Armour. ISBN 1-85409-515-3.
- Rohwer, Jürgen (1983). Axis Submarine Successes 1939–45. Annapolis, Maryland, US: Naval Institute Press. ISBN 0-87021-082-3.
- Sharpe, Peter (1998). U-Boat Fact File. Great Britain: Midland Publishing. ISBN 1-85780-072-9.
- Wynn, Kenneth (1998). U-Boat Operations of the Second World War: Volume 2: Career Histories, U511–UIT25. London: Chatham Publishing. ISBN 1-86176-069-8.
