= Lehmkuhlen =

- Municipality
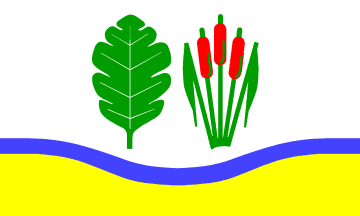
- Flag Coat of arms

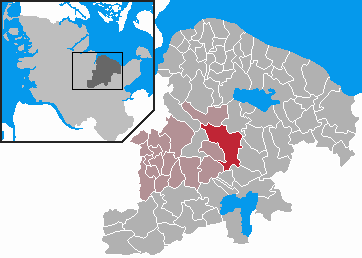
- Location of Lehmkuhlen within Plön district
- Interactive map of Lehmkuhlen
- Location within Germany Location within Schleswig-Holstein
- Coordinates: 54°14′N 10°22′E
- Country: Germany
- State: Schleswig-Holstein
- District: Plön
- Municipal assoc.: Preetz-Land
- Subdivisions: 4

Government
  - Mayor: Norbert Langfeldt

Area
  - Total: 31.23 km^{2} (12.06 sq mi)
- Elevation: 37 m (121 ft)

Population (2025-12-31)
  - Total: 1,247
  - Density: 39.93/km^{2} (103.4/sq mi)
- Time zone: UTC+01:00 (CET)
  - Summer (DST): UTC+02:00 (CEST)
- Postal codes: 24211
- Dialling codes: 04342
- Vehicle registration: PLÖ
- Website: www.amtpreetzland.de

Lehmkuhlen is a municipality in the district of Plön, in Schleswig-Holstein, Germany.

== Points of interest ==
- Arboretum Lehmkuhlen
