= Pohnsdorf =

- Municipality
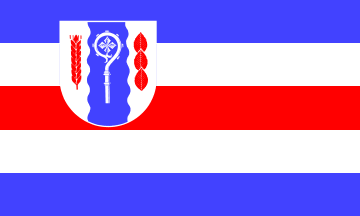
- Flag Coat of arms

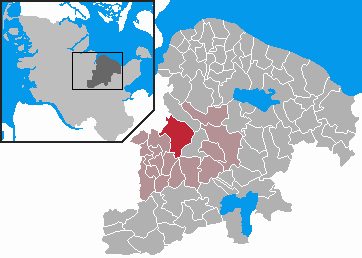
- Location of Pohnsdorf within Plön district
- Interactive map of Pohnsdorf
- Location within Germany Location within Schleswig-Holstein
- Coordinates: 54°13′N 10°15′E
- Country: Germany
- State: Schleswig-Holstein
- District: Plön
- Municipal assoc.: Preetz-Land

Government
  - Mayor: Wolf-Dietrich Rath

Area
  - Total: 24.62 km^{2} (9.51 sq mi)
- Elevation: 24 m (79 ft)

Population (2025-12-31)
  - Total: 398
  - Density: 16.2/km^{2} (41.9/sq mi)
- Time zone: UTC+01:00 (CET)
  - Summer (DST): UTC+02:00 (CEST)
- Postal codes: 24211
- Dialling codes: 04342
- Vehicle registration: PLÖ
- Website: www.amtpreetzland.de

Pohnsdorf is a municipality in the district of Plön, in Schleswig-Holstein, Germany.
