= Großbarkau =

- Municipality
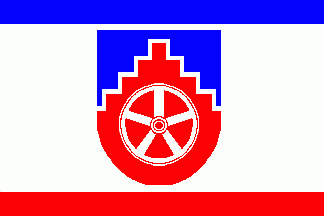
- Flag Coat of arms

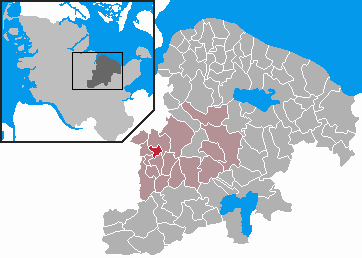
- Location of Großbarkau within Plön district
- Interactive map of Großbarkau
- Location within Germany Location within Schleswig-Holstein
- Coordinates: 54°14′N 10°10′E
- Country: Germany
- State: Schleswig-Holstein
- District: Plön
- Municipal assoc.: Preetz-Land

Government
  - Mayor: Daniel Smederevac

Area
  - Total: 2.93 km^{2} (1.13 sq mi)
- Elevation: 38 m (125 ft)

Population (2025-12-31)
  - Total: 252
  - Density: 86.0/km^{2} (223/sq mi)
- Time zone: UTC+01:00 (CET)
  - Summer (DST): UTC+02:00 (CEST)
- Postal codes: 24245
- Dialling codes: 04342
- Vehicle registration: PLÖ
- Website: www.amtpreetzland.de

Großbarkau is a municipality in the district of Plön, in Schleswig-Holstein, Germany.
