= Rümpel =

- Municipality
- Coat of arms

- Location of Rümpel within Stormarn district
- Interactive map of Rümpel
- Location within Germany Location within Schleswig-Holstein
- Coordinates: 53°47′N 10°21′E
- Country: Germany
- State: Schleswig-Holstein
- District: Stormarn
- Municipal assoc.: Bad Oldesloe-Land
- Subdivisions: 3

Government
  - Mayor: Claus-Jürgen Vieregge (CDU)

Area
  - Total: 15.89 km^{2} (6.14 sq mi)
- Elevation: 14–24 m (46–79 ft)

Population (2025-12-31)
  - Total: 1,338
  - Density: 84.20/km^{2} (218.1/sq mi)
- Time zone: UTC+01:00 (CET)
  - Summer (DST): UTC+02:00 (CEST)
- Postal codes: 23843
- Dialling codes: 04531
- Vehicle registration: OD
- Website: www.amt-bad- oldesloe-land.de

Rümpel (German pronunciation: [ˈʁʏmpl̩]) is a municipality in the district of Stormarn, in Schleswig-Holstein, Germany.
