= Bargteheide =

- Town
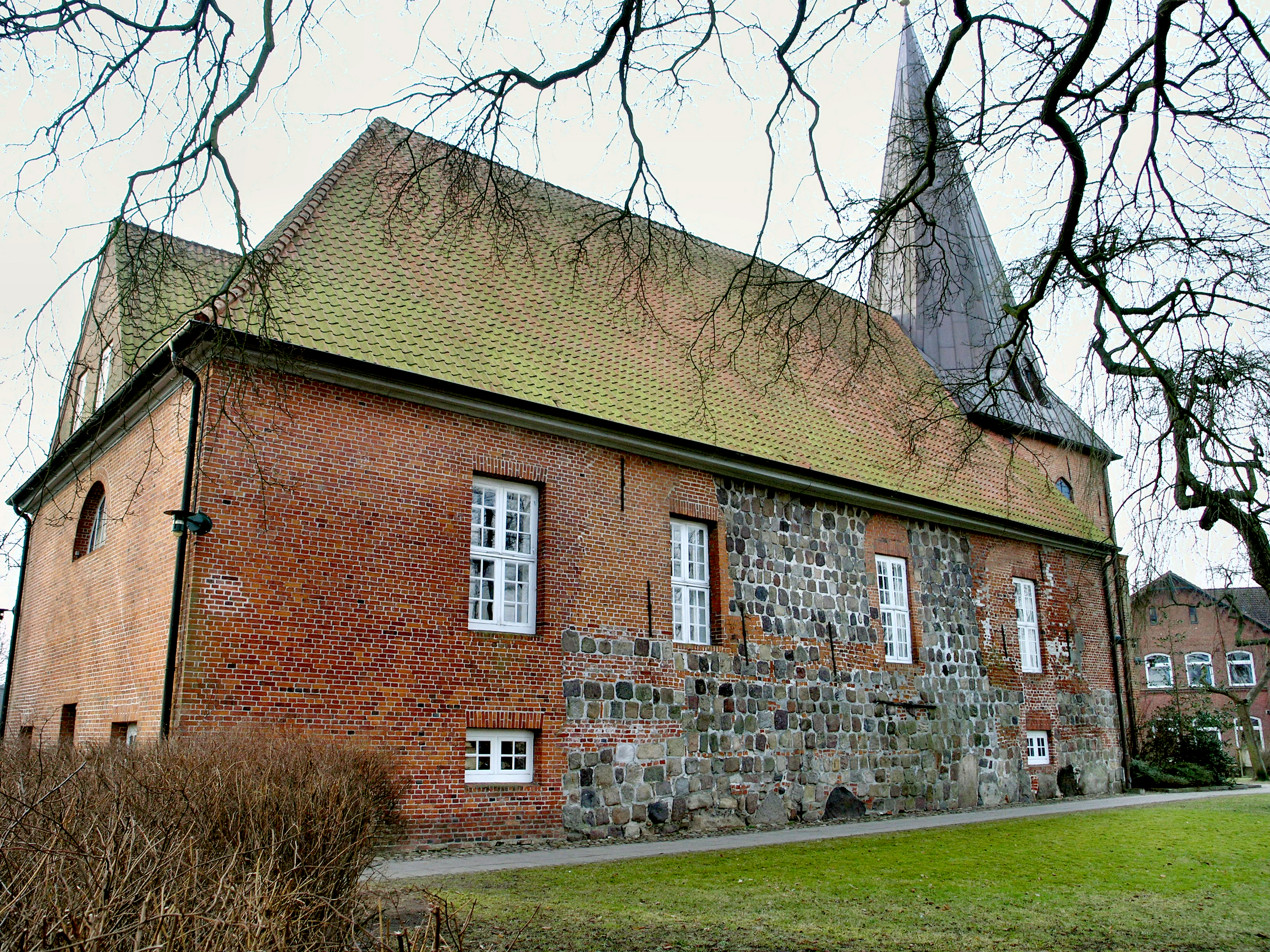

- Coat of arms

- Location of Bargteheide within Stormarn district
- Interactive map of Bargteheide
- Location within Germany Location within Schleswig-Holstein
- Coordinates: 53°43′N 10°16′E
- Country: Germany
- State: Schleswig-Holstein
- District: Stormarn

Government
  - Mayor: Birte Kruse-Gobrecht (Ind.)

Area
  - Total: 15.82 km^{2} (6.11 sq mi)
- Elevation: 48 m (157 ft)

Population (2025-12-31)
  - Total: 16,385
  - Density: 1,036/km^{2} (2,682/sq mi)
- Time zone: UTC+01:00 (CET)
  - Summer (DST): UTC+02:00 (CEST)
- Postal codes: 22941
- Dialling codes: 04532
- Vehicle registration: OD
- Website: www.bargteheide.de

Bargteheide (German pronunciation: [baʁktəˈhaɪdə]; Low German: Bartheil) is a town in the district of Stormarn, Schleswig-Holstein state, Germany. It is situated between the cities of Ahrensburg and Bad Oldesloe, on the Hamburg to Lübeck rail line and is part of the Hamburg Metropolitan Region.

The population of Bargteheide was 16,045 at the end of 2017.

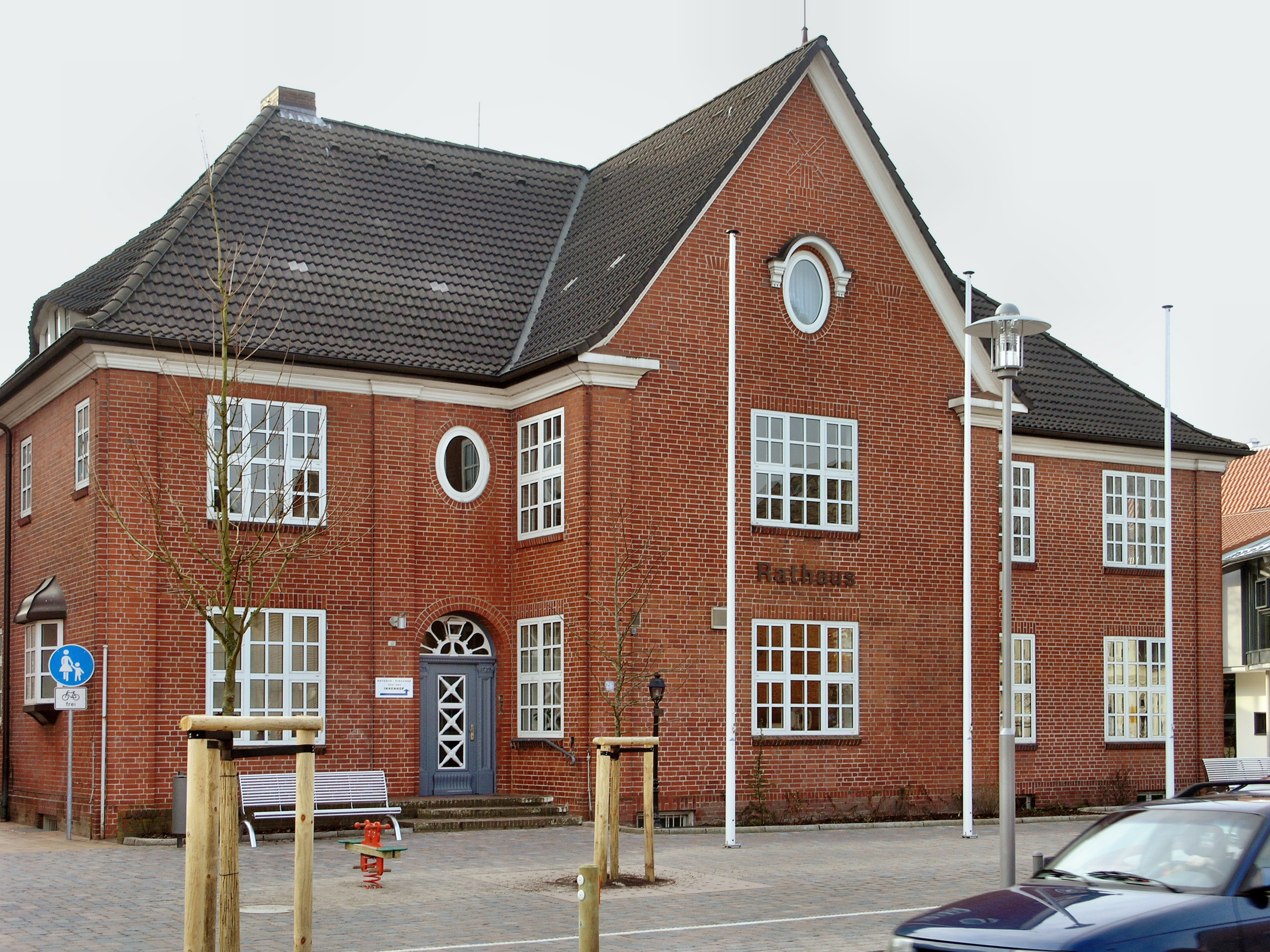
Bargteheide Town hall (Rathaus)

== Mayors ==
- 1946–1957: Julius Gerken
- 1957–1962: Enno Wilkens
- 1962–1971: Karl Eduard Claussen (CDU)
- 1971–1984: Erich Reincke
- 1985–1996: Frank Pries
- 1996–2008: Werner Mitsch
- 2008–2016: Henning Görtz (CDU)
- since 2016: Birte Kruse-Gobrecht (independent)

== Population development ==
- 1840: c. 1,000
- 1905: 1,980
- 1914: 2,300
- 1949: 6,900
- 1970: 7,374
- 2002: 13,820
- 2008: 14,902
- 2009: 15,306
- 2012: 15,528
- 2013: 16,000
- 2015: 16,292

== Notable people ==
- Luise Zietz (1865–1922), socialist politician
- Katharina Fegebank (born 1977), German politician (The Greens)
- David Kross (born 1990), German actor
- Axel Fischer (born 1981), German pop singer and actor
- Matti Steinmann (born 1995), Finnish-German footballer

== International relations ==
Bargteheide is twinned with:

- Déville-lès-Rouen, France
- Żmigród, Poland
