= Löptin =

- Municipality
- Flag Coat of arms

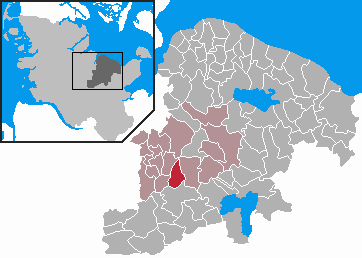
- Location of Löptin within Plön district
- Interactive map of Löptin
- Location within Germany Location within Schleswig-Holstein
- Coordinates: 54°10′N 10°13′E
- Country: Germany
- State: Schleswig-Holstein
- District: Plön
- Municipal assoc.: Preetz-Land

Government
  - Mayor: Uwe Mewes (since 2013)

Area
  - Total: 9.08 km^{2} (3.51 sq mi)
- Elevation: 36 m (118 ft)

Population (2025-12-31)
  - Total: 284
  - Density: 31.3/km^{2} (81.0/sq mi)
- Time zone: UTC+01:00 (CET)
  - Summer (DST): UTC+02:00 (CEST)
- Postal codes: 24250
- Dialling codes: 04302, 04342
- Vehicle registration: PLÖ
- Website: www.amtpreetzland.de

Löptin is a municipality in the district of Plön, in Schleswig-Holstein, Germany.
