= Tremsbüttel =

- Municipality
- Coat of arms

- Location of Tremsbüttel within Stormarn district
- Interactive map of Tremsbüttel
- Location within Germany Location within Schleswig-Holstein
- Coordinates: 53°44′12″N 10°18′12″E
- Country: Germany
- State: Schleswig-Holstein
- District: Stormarn
- Municipal assoc.: Bargteheide-Land

Government
  - Mayor: Erika Mosel

Area
  - Total: 10.33 km^{2} (3.99 sq mi)
- Elevation: 46 m (151 ft)

Population (2025-12-31)
  - Total: 1,887
  - Density: 182.7/km^{2} (473.1/sq mi)
- Time zone: UTC+01:00 (CET)
  - Summer (DST): UTC+02:00 (CEST)
- Postal codes: 22967
- Dialling codes: 04532, 04531
- Vehicle registration: OD
- Website: www.bargteheide- land.de

Tremsbüttel is a municipality in the district of Stormarn, in Schleswig-Holstein, Germany.
