= Daldorf =

- Municipality
- Coat of arms

- Location of Daldorf within Segeberg district
- Interactive map of Daldorf
- Location within Germany Location within Schleswig-Holstein
- Coordinates: 54°1′1″N 10°14′59″E
- Country: Germany
- State: Schleswig-Holstein
- District: Segeberg
- Municipal assoc.: Boostedt-Rickling

Government
  - Mayor: Jürgen Frank (CDU)

Area
  - Total: 15.16 km^{2} (5.85 sq mi)
- Elevation: 42 m (138 ft)

Population (2025-12-31)
  - Total: 619
  - Density: 40.8/km^{2} (106/sq mi)
- Time zone: UTC+01:00 (CET)
  - Summer (DST): UTC+02:00 (CEST)
- Postal codes: 24635
- Dialling codes: 04328, 04557
- Vehicle registration: SE
- Website: Daldorf (Boostedt-Rickling)

Daldorf is a municipality in the district of Segeberg, in Schleswig-Holstein, Germany.
