= Moorsee =

Lake in Germany

- Location within Mecklenburg-Vorpommern
- Location: Mecklenburgische Seenplatte, Mecklenburg-Vorpommern
- Coordinates: 53°28′29″N 12°42′19″E
- Basin countries: Germany
- Surface area: 0.164 km^{2} (0.063 sq mi)
- Surface elevation: 62.5 m (205 ft)

Moorsee is a lake in the Mecklenburgische Seenplatte district in Mecklenburg-Vorpommern, Germany. At an elevation of 62.5 m, its surface area is 0.164 km^{2}.
