= Schwissel =

- Municipality
- Coat of arms

- Location of Schwissel within Segeberg district
- Interactive map of Schwissel
- Location within Germany Location within Schleswig-Holstein
- Coordinates: 53°53′N 10°18′E
- Country: Germany
- State: Schleswig-Holstein
- District: Segeberg
- Municipal assoc.: Leezen

Government
  - Mayor: Jürgen Hildebrandt-Möller

Area
  - Total: 4.44 km^{2} (1.71 sq mi)
- Elevation: 42 m (138 ft)

Population (2025-12-31)
  - Total: 266
  - Density: 59.9/km^{2} (155/sq mi)
- Time zone: UTC+01:00 (CET)
  - Summer (DST): UTC+02:00 (CEST)
- Postal codes: 23795
- Dialling codes: 04551
- Vehicle registration: SE
- Website: www.amt-leezen.de

Schwissel is a municipality in the district of Segeberg, in Schleswig-Holstein, Germany.
