= Grönwohld =

- Municipality
- Coat of arms

- Location of Grönwohld within Stormarn district
- Interactive map of Grönwohld
- Location within Germany Location within Schleswig-Holstein
- Coordinates: 53°38′30″N 10°24′30″E
- Country: Germany
- State: Schleswig-Holstein
- District: Stormarn
- Municipal assoc.: Trittau

Government
  - Mayor: Ralf Breisacher (CDU)

Area
  - Total: 9.79 km^{2} (3.78 sq mi)
- Elevation: 41 m (135 ft)

Population (2025-12-31)
  - Total: 1,478
  - Density: 151/km^{2} (391/sq mi)
- Time zone: UTC+01:00 (CET)
  - Summer (DST): UTC+02:00 (CEST)
- Postal codes: 22956
- Dialling codes: 04154, 04534
- Vehicle registration: OD
- Website: www.amt-trittau.de

Grönwohld is a municipality in the district of Stormarn, in Schleswig-Holstein, Germany.
