= German submarine U-521 =

German World War II submarine

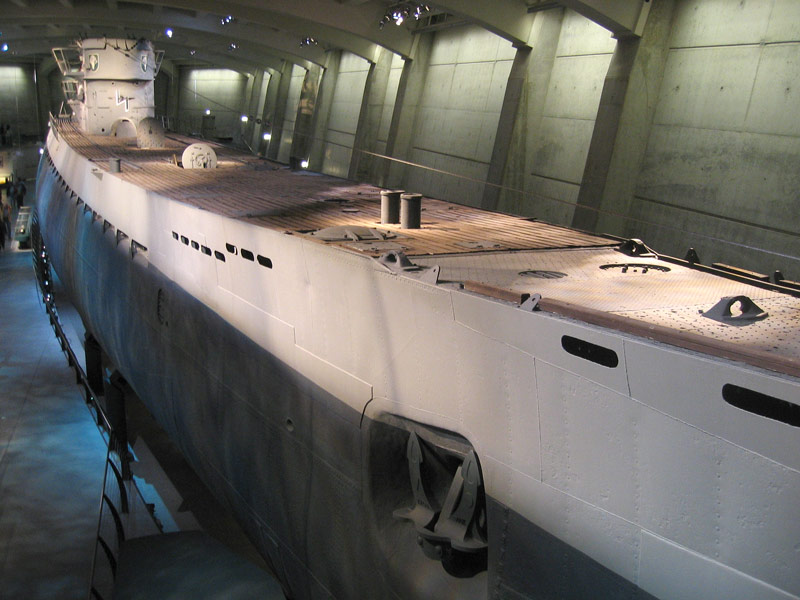
- U-505, a typical Type IXC boat

History

Nazi Germany
- Name: U-521
- Ordered: 14 February 1940
- Builder: Deutsche Werft, Hamburg
- Yard number: 336
- Laid down: 3 July 1941
- Launched: 17 March 1942
- Commissioned: 3 June 1942
- Fate: Sunk on 2 June 1943

General characteristics
- Class & type: Type IXC submarine
- Displacement: 1,120 t (1,100 long tons) surfaced; 1,232 t (1,213 long tons) submerged
- Length: 76.76 m (251 ft 10 in) o/a; 58.75 m (192 ft 9 in) pressure hull
- Beam: 6.76 m (22 ft 2 in) o/a; 4.40 m (14 ft 5 in) pressure hull
- Height: 9.60 m (31 ft 6 in)
- Draught: 4.70 m (15 ft 5 in)
- Installed power: 4,400 PS (3,200 kW; 4,300 bhp) (diesels); 1,000 PS (740 kW; 990 shp) (electric)
- Propulsion: 2 shafts; 2 × diesel engines; 2 × electric motors
- Speed: 18.3 knots (33.9 km/h; 21.1 mph) surfaced; 7.3 knots (13.5 km/h; 8.4 mph) submerged
- Range: 13,450 nmi (24,910 km; 15,480 mi) at 10 knots (19 km/h; 12 mph) surfaced; 64 nmi (119 km; 74 mi) at 4 knots (7.4 km/h; 4.6 mph) submerged
- Test depth: 230 m (750 ft)
- Complement: 4 officers, 44 enlisted
- Armament: 6 × torpedo tubes (4 bow, 2 stern); 22 × 53.3 cm (21 in) torpedoes; 1 × 10.5 cm (4.1 in) SK C/32 deck gun (180 rounds); 1 × 3.7 cm (1.5 in) SK C/30 AA gun; 1 × 2 cm FlaK 38 AA guns

Service record
- Part of: 4th U-boat Flotilla; 3 June – 30 September 1942; 2nd U-boat Flotilla; 1 October 1942 – 2 June 1943
- Identification codes: M 46 411
- Commanders: Kptlt. Klaus Bargsten; 3 June 1942 – 2 June 1943
- Operations: 3 patrols: 1st patrol: 6 October – 8 December 1942; 2nd patrol: 7 January – 26 March 1943; 3rd patrol: 5 May – 2 June 1943
- Victories: 3 merchant ships sunk (19,551 GRT); 1 auxiliary warship sunk (750 GRT)

German submarine U-521 was a Type IXC U-boat of Nazi Germany's Kriegsmarine during World War II.

She was built by the Deutsche Werft yard at Finkenwerder, Hamburg with yard number 336. Commissioned in June 1942, she was commanded by Kapitänleutnant Klaus Bargsten.

The U-boat was assigned to the 4th U-boat Flotilla for training and the 2nd flotilla for operations.

U-521 was sunk on 2 June 1943 by the submarine chaser USS Gilmer. The only survivor was Bargsten himself. This was the second boat under Bargsten's command, and the first that suffered heavy losses. The wreck of the submarine has never been found.

== Design ==
German Type IXC submarines were slightly larger than the original Type IXBs. U-521 had a displacement of 1,120 tonnes (1,100 long tons) when at the surface and 1,232 tonnes (1,213 long tons) while submerged. The U-boat had a total length of 76.76 m (251 ft 10 in), a pressure hull length of 58.75 m (192 ft 9 in), a beam of 6.76 m (22 ft 2 in), a height of 9.60 m (31 ft 6 in), and a draught of 4.70 m (15 ft 5 in). The submarine was powered by two MAN M 9 V 40/46 supercharged four-stroke, nine-cylinder diesel engines producing a total of 4,400 metric horsepower (3,240 kW; 4,340 shp) for use while surfaced, two Siemens-Schuckert 2 GU 345/34 double-acting electric motors producing a total of 1,000 shaft horsepower (1,010 PS; 750 kW) for use while submerged. She had two shafts and two 1.92 m (6 ft) propellers. The boat was capable of operating at depths of up to 230 metres (750 ft).

The submarine had a maximum surface speed of 18.3 knots (33.9 km/h; 21.1 mph) and a maximum submerged speed of 7.3 knots (13.5 km/h; 8.4 mph). When submerged, the boat could operate for 63 nautical miles (117 km; 72 mi) at 4 knots (7.4 km/h; 4.6 mph); when surfaced, she could travel 13,450 nautical miles (24,910 km; 15,480 mi) at 10 knots (19 km/h; 12 mph). U-521 was fitted with six 53.3 cm (21 in) torpedo tubes (four fitted at the bow and two at the stern), 22 torpedoes, one 10.5 cm (4.13 in) SK C/32 naval gun, 180 rounds, and a 3.7 cm (1.5 in) SK C/30 as well as a 2 cm (0.79 in) C/30 anti-aircraft gun. The boat had a complement of forty-eight.

== Service history ==
=== First patrol ===
U-521 sailed from Hamburg on her first patrol on 6 October 1942. She followed the usual course, sailing up the coast of Norway and then west, through the "Rosengarten" into the Atlantic. When she was north of Scotland, U-521 was attacked by an aircraft. According to Bargsten, he was standing on the bridge when the aircraft suddenly appeared out of the clouds, flying very low. The aircraft was carrying a trailing antenna, which almost struck the boat. Bargsten thought at first that it was a new weapon. The bomb-bay doors were open, but the aircraft did not drop any bombs. U-521 submerged, and, after it had gained considerable depth, several bombs were heard to explode.

The first war cruise lasted over nine weeks and accounted for five merchant vessels and a corvette. Two ships were sunk from an eastbound convoy and two more from one that was westbound. The fifth ship was a freighter which had been crippled by an attack from another U-boat and had dropped out of her convoy. She was guarded by a corvette. U-521 approached this target at night on the surface. The first torpedo was fired at a range of about 2,000 metres (2,200 yd). Due to the presence of the corvette, Bargsten was somewhat cautious, and after firing, immediately turned the boat in order to be able to fire again from his stern tube while escaping. The first torpedo passed astern of the merchantmen and hit the corvette which sank rapidly. The freighter was then easily disposed-of at close range.

U-521's first patrol ended on 8 December 1942. She put in at Lorient in occupied France, where she had been assigned to the 2nd U-boat Flotilla, commanded by Korvettenkapitän Viktor Schütze of the 1925 naval term. Schütze was greatly admired by Bargsten, he spoke of a four-hour interview that he (Bargsten) had had with the flotilla commander. Bargsten was given credit for having sunk 29,000 tons of shipping and one corvette.

U-521 remained in Lorient for about three weeks, taking on supplies and preparing for her next sortie.

=== Second patrol ===
U-521 sailed from Lorient on her second patrol on 7 January 1943. Her operational area was in the vicinity of the Azores. She attacked several convoys on this patrol in the company of other U-boats. One of these attacks took place about 25 February 1943 in company with U-569 commanded by Oberleutnant Hans Johannsen (U-569 was sunk on 22 May 1943).

During the course of an attack on a Gibraltar-bound convoy, U-521 sank three ships. After firing at the last of the three, Bargsten noticed another U-boat on a collision course with his boat. U-521 came to a full stop, the other submarine crossed her bow about 50 m (55 yd) away. These maneuvers attracted the attention of American destroyers escorting the convoy, and U-521 was severely depth charged. Although about 70 depth charges were dropped, Bargsten was rather scornful of this attack. He stated that he easily eluded his enemies without making use of the S.B.T. and he criticized the destroyers for a lack of tenacity. The U-boat sustained some damage, including a slightly bent propeller shaft.

In spite of the damage, U-521 was able to remain at sea and succeeded in sinking another merchantman and a corvette. The freighter, a liberty ship, was hove-to and was being guarded by a corvette when she was sighted by the U-boat. It was a bright moonlit night, and the corvette was patrolling the dark side of the freighter. Bargsten, realizing that the corvette expected an attack from the dark side, approached from the moonlit side, on the surface. While drawing near to his target, Bargsten turned to his executive officer and said; "I feel like a naked man walking through the streets of a city."

The executive officer fired five torpedoes. Four of them missed completely, the fifth hit the corvette just as she was coming forward of the target. A sixth torpedo was fired by the second watch officer and found its mark. Bargsten attributed the executive officer's poor marksmanship to the fact that he failed to take into account the slight roll of the boat when he was making his calculations.

When U-521 was almost ready to return to her base, she was met by a supply U-boat from which she transferred oil and provisions. Bargsten stated that other U-boats were present, including U-569.

U-521 returned to Lorient on 26 March 1943 after having been at sea for 79 days. Schütze had been replaced by Korvettenkapitän Ernst Kals of the 1924 naval term as commanding officer of the second U-boat Flotilla. Bargsten's interview with Kals was a brief one, he felt that Kals was much less understanding than Schütze. Bargsten was credited with sinking 39,000 tons of shipping and one corvette on this patrol.

U-521 entered dry dock in Lorient for repairs. Bargsten was given leave and went to his home in Bremen, where he remained until 28 April 1943. While in Bremen, he witnessed a daylight bombing raid by American B-17 Flying Fortresses. He said that about 20 of the American bombers were shot down.

Bargsten arrived back in Lorient on 29 April 1943. On 2 May, he was awarded the Knight's Cross of the Iron Cross. Korvettenkapitän Hans-Rudolf Rösing of the 1924 naval term made the presentation. Three days later, U-521 sailed on her last patrol.

=== Third and final patrol ===
U-521 sailed from Lorient at about 1300 German Summer Time, on 5 May 1943. Her operational area was designated as being off the U.S. coast in the neighborhood of Cape Hatteras. She reached this area about 30 May, and on the same day, sighted planes and two destroyers. However, the boat was not discovered.

On 2 June at about 1200hrs, U-521 was proceeding on a course of 250° (WSW) at a depth of 31 m (102 ft). The sound operator reported propeller noises, but a few minutes later he reported that the noises had faded out and that all was quiet. Bargsten was lying in his bunk reading a travel book, immersed in a chapter called "Middletown, U.S.A.", as the submarine chaser USS PC-565 gained a Q.C. (sonar) contact on U-521 and closed in for the attack.

=== Sinking ===
At about 1230hrs in position 37°43′N 73°16′W, while escorting Convoy NG-365, the submarine chaser USS PC-565 obtained her first contact on U-521. She altered course, maintained contact, and at 1239hrs dropped a standard five-charge pattern set for 100 feet.

Meanwhile, Bargsten was peacefully reading in his bunk when the sound operator rushed in to report propeller noises directly overhead. Immediately thereafter, the depth charges exploded. Instruments were shattered, the lights went out, the motors stopped, rudder and diving planes were rendered useless, and water entered the control room through the depth and tank pressure gauge connections.

Bargsten at once gave the order to dive, although he did not know the extent of the damage received. After a few seconds, the engineer officer reported that the boat was at 150 m (490 ft). Bargsten told him that that was "nonsense", but the engineer insisted and called off further readings from the control room depth gauge: "160 metres; 170 metres". The accuracy of the depth charges was devastating. Inside U-521, all instruments were shattered, all breakers blown and the diving planes and rudder were also disabled. Cold seawater was coming down the main hatch. Bargsten gave the order to dive for cover. After a few seconds, Oberleutnant (Ing.) Henning reported that they were sinking. She was already down to 150 m (490 ft) and dropping rapidly. Even though it did not make sense to Bargsten that the U-boat could plummet so quickly, he gave the order to blow all ballast. Bargsten subsequently realised that the U-boat could not have descended to the depths called off by the engineer officer without becoming heavy by the bow or the stern, whereas she had kept an even keel throughout. The main depth gauge must have been knocked out by the depth charges. Upon breaking the surface, Bargsten went to the bridge to make a topside assessment of the situation.

PC-565 was about 350 m (380 yd) distant when the U-boat appeared. The patrol craft fired about 55 rounds with her 20 mm gun, scoring several hits on the conning tower. The gun jammed as the ship was turning to ram her target. Another escort vessel, USS Brisk (PG-89), fired one shell from her No.1 gun and missed the U-boat by about 50 m (55 yd). She ceased firing then, as PC-565 was in the line of fire.

When Bargsten observed the maneuvers of PC-565 and saw the patrol craft bearing down on him, he realized the U-boat's position was hopeless and gave the order to flood and abandon ship. It was not until he saw his engineer officer coming through the conning tower hatchway, that Bargsten realised the former had become panicky, since the engineer's station was in the control room. His last view of his boat was of water pouring down the conning tower hatch as she went under. U-521 then suddenly sank, leaving Bargsten swimming in the water. The rest of the crew – 50 men – went down with the ship.

When the U-boat disappeared, PC-565 altered course to the right to pass ahead of the swirl. At 1243hrs, she dropped one depth charge set at 30 m (98 ft) about 100 m (110 yd) ahead of the position of the sinking. She then moved in to pick up the only survivor, and several large air slugs were observed. The patrol craft continued to search the area, and at 1325hrs several oil slicks were sighted. One slick was dark with globules of brown oil, but it was not iridescent. Patches of vegetable fiber and splinters of freshly broken wood were observed. At 1338hrs, PC-565 picked up a large piece of human flesh. The search was abandoned at 1430hrs.

At 0045hrs on 3 June, USS Chickadee (AM-59) conducted a box search in the vicinity of the sinking. Results were negative. At daylight, an oil slick was seen, originating at the approximate position of the sinking and extending for about 31.7 km (17.1 nmi). Its width varied from 20–300 m (66–984 ft). Samples of oil were taken and after analysis, proved to be lubricating oil.

Operating on the theory that the U-boat was not sunk but was proceeding submerged and bleeding oil, Chickadee conducted a box search in the vicinity of the origin of the slick. The results were again negative. It was observed that the current was flowing in the direction of the wind. The conclusion was reached that the combined effect of wind and current caused the great length of the oil slick and that in fact, the U-boat had been sunk.

NOAA provides a record of the vessel at record 992 at chart 12200, indicating that the vessel is within 3–5 miles of the coordinates provided.

=== Wolfpacks ===
U-521 took part in three wolfpacks, namely:

- Kreuzotter (8 – 21 November 1942)
- Rochen (27 January – 28 February 1943)
- Tümmler (12 – 22 March 1943)

== Summary of raiding history ==
Date	Ship Name	Nationality	Tonnage (GRT)	Fate
2 November 1942	Hartington	United Kingdom	5,496	Sunk
3 November 1942	Hahira	United States	6,855	Sunk
8 February 1943	HMT Bredon	Royal Navy	750	Sunk
18 March 1943	Molly Pitcher	United States	7,200	Sunk

== See also ==
- Franz Machon

== Bibliography ==
- Busch, Rainer; Röll, Hans-Joachim (1999). German U-boat commanders of World War II : a biographical dictionary. Translated by Brooks, Geoffrey. London, Annapolis, Md: Greenhill Books, Naval Institute Press. ISBN 1-55750-186-6.
- Busch, Rainer; Röll, Hans-Joachim (1999). Deutsche U-Boot-Verluste von September 1939 bis Mai 1945 [German U-boat losses from September 1939 to May 1945]. Der U-Boot-Krieg (in German). Vol. IV. Hamburg, Berlin, Bonn: Mittler. ISBN 3-8132-0514-2.
- Gröner, Erich; Jung, Dieter; Maass, Martin (1991). U-boats and Mine Warfare Vessels. German Warships 1815–1945. Vol. 2. Translated by Thomas, Keith; Magowan, Rachel. London: Conway Maritime Press. ISBN 0-85177-593-4.
- Kemp, Paul (1999). U-Boats Destroyed - German Submarine Losses in the World Wars. London: Arms & Armour. ISBN 1-85409-515-3.
