= Lütjensee =

- Municipality
- Coat of arms

- Location of Lütjensee within Stormarn district
- Interactive map of Lütjensee
- Location within Germany Location within Schleswig-Holstein
- Coordinates: 53°38′N 10°22′E
- Country: Germany
- State: Schleswig-Holstein
- District: Stormarn
- Municipal assoc.: Trittau
- Subdivisions: 3

Government
  - Mayor: Andreas Körber (CDU)

Area
  - Total: 14.05 km^{2} (5.42 sq mi)
- Elevation: 53 m (174 ft)

Population (2025-12-31)
  - Total: 3,293
  - Density: 234.4/km^{2} (607.0/sq mi)
- Time zone: UTC+01:00 (CET)
  - Summer (DST): UTC+02:00 (CEST)
- Postal codes: 22952
- Dialling codes: 04154, 04534
- Vehicle registration: OD
- Website: www.amt-trittau.de

Lütjensee is a municipality in the district of Stormarn, in Schleswig-Holstein, Germany.
