= Boksee =

- Municipality
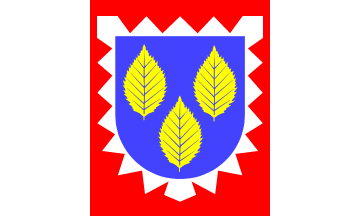
- Flag Coat of arms

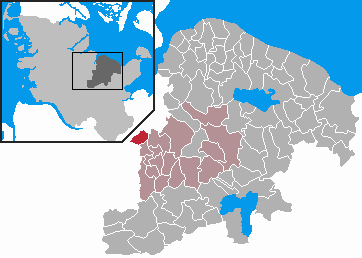
- Location of Boksee within Plön district
- Interactive map of Boksee
- Location within Germany Location within Schleswig-Holstein
- Coordinates: 54°14′40″N 10°7′50″E
- Country: Germany
- State: Schleswig-Holstein
- District: Plön
- Municipal assoc.: Preetz-Land

Government
  - Mayor: Hans Meß

Area
  - Total: 5.52 km^{2} (2.13 sq mi)
- Elevation: 58 m (190 ft)

Population (2025-12-31)
  - Total: 460
  - Density: 83/km^{2} (220/sq mi)
- Time zone: UTC+01:00 (CET)
  - Summer (DST): UTC+02:00 (CEST)
- Postal codes: 24220
- Dialling codes: 04347, 04302
- Vehicle registration: PLÖ
- Website: www.amtpreetzland.de

Boksee is a municipality in the district of Plön, in Schleswig-Holstein, Germany.
