= Nettelsee =

- Municipality
- Coat of arms

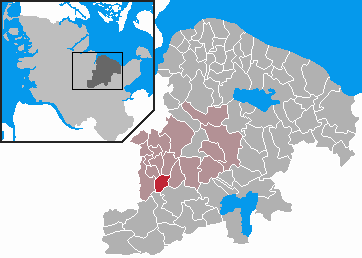
- Location of Nettelsee within Plön district
- Interactive map of Nettelsee
- Location within Germany Location within Schleswig-Holstein
- Coordinates: 54°10′N 10°10′E
- Country: Germany
- State: Schleswig-Holstein
- District: Plön
- Municipal assoc.: Preetz-Land

Government
  - Mayor: Anke Jahnke

Area
  - Total: 6.47 km^{2} (2.50 sq mi)
- Elevation: 35 m (115 ft)

Population (2025-12-31)
  - Total: 451
  - Density: 69.7/km^{2} (181/sq mi)
- Time zone: UTC+01:00 (CET)
  - Summer (DST): UTC+02:00 (CEST)
- Postal codes: 24250
- Dialling codes: 04302
- Vehicle registration: PLÖ
- Website: www.amtpreetzland.de

Nettelsee is a municipality in the district of Plön, in Schleswig-Holstein, Germany.
