= Klein Barkau =

- Municipality
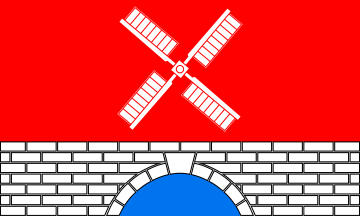
- Flag Coat of arms

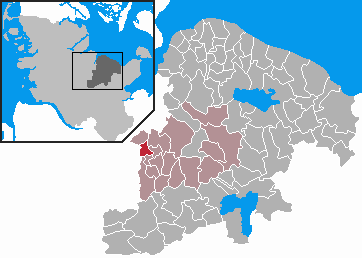
- Location of Klein Barkau within Plön district
- Interactive map of Klein Barkau
- Location within Germany Location within Schleswig-Holstein
- Coordinates: 54°14′N 10°8′E
- Country: Germany
- State: Schleswig-Holstein
- District: Plön
- Municipal assoc.: Preetz-Land

Government
  - Mayor: Uwe Hallmann

Area
  - Total: 4.19 km^{2} (1.62 sq mi)
- Elevation: 41 m (135 ft)

Population (2025-12-31)
  - Total: 267
  - Density: 63.7/km^{2} (165/sq mi)
- Time zone: UTC+01:00 (CET)
  - Summer (DST): UTC+02:00 (CEST)
- Postal codes: 24245
- Dialling codes: 04302
- Vehicle registration: PLÖ
- Website: www.amtpreetzland.de

Klein Barkau is a municipality in the district of Plön, in Schleswig-Holstein, Germany.
