= Klaus Bargsten =

German WW2 U-Boat commander

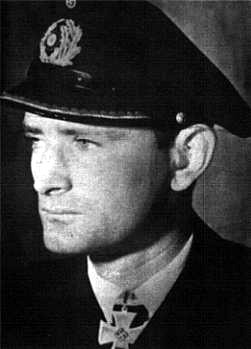
- Klaus Bargsten
- Born: 31 October 1911; Bad Oldesloe, German Empire
- Died: 25 October 2000 (aged 88); Bremen, Germany
- Military career
- Allegiance: Nazi Germany
- Branch: Kriegsmarine
- Service years: 1936–45
- Rank: Kapitänleutnant
- Units: 1st U-boat Flotilla; 2nd U-boat Flotilla; 4th U-boat Flotilla
- Commands: U-563, 27 March 1941 – 15 March 1942; U-521, 3 June 1942 – 2 June 1943
- Awards: U-boat War Badge; Knight's Cross

Klaus Bargsten (31 October 1911 – 25 October 2000) was the captain and sole survivor of the sunken German submarine U-521. He was a recipient of the Knight's Cross of the Iron Cross.

== Career ==
U-521 under Bargsten's command was sunk on 2 June 1943 by the United States submarine chaser PC-565 east of Cape Hatteras. Bargsten was the sole survivor.

Kapitänleutnant Klaus Bargsten arrives in Norfolk

Bargsten was interrogated and held as a prisoner of war until his release in 1946. The Kriegsmarine falsely reported the entire crew of U-521 as missing in action.

== Ranks and military decorations ==
=== Ranks ===
The following is a list of dates for Kptlt. Bargsten's promotions during World War II.

Date	Rank
1 July 1936	Fähnrich zur See
1 January 1938	Oberfähnrich zur See
1 April 1938	Leutnant zur See
1 October 1939	Oberleutnant zur See
1 August 1942	Kapitänleutnant

=== Decorations ===
The following is a list of Kptlt. Bargsten's awards and decorations.

Date	Decoration
23 July 1940	Iron Cross (1939) 2nd Class
10 August 1940	U-boat War Badge (1939)
25 September 1940	Iron Cross (1939) 1st Class
30 April 1943	Knight's Cross as Kapitänleutnant and commander of U-521
