= Bad Oldesloe =

- Town
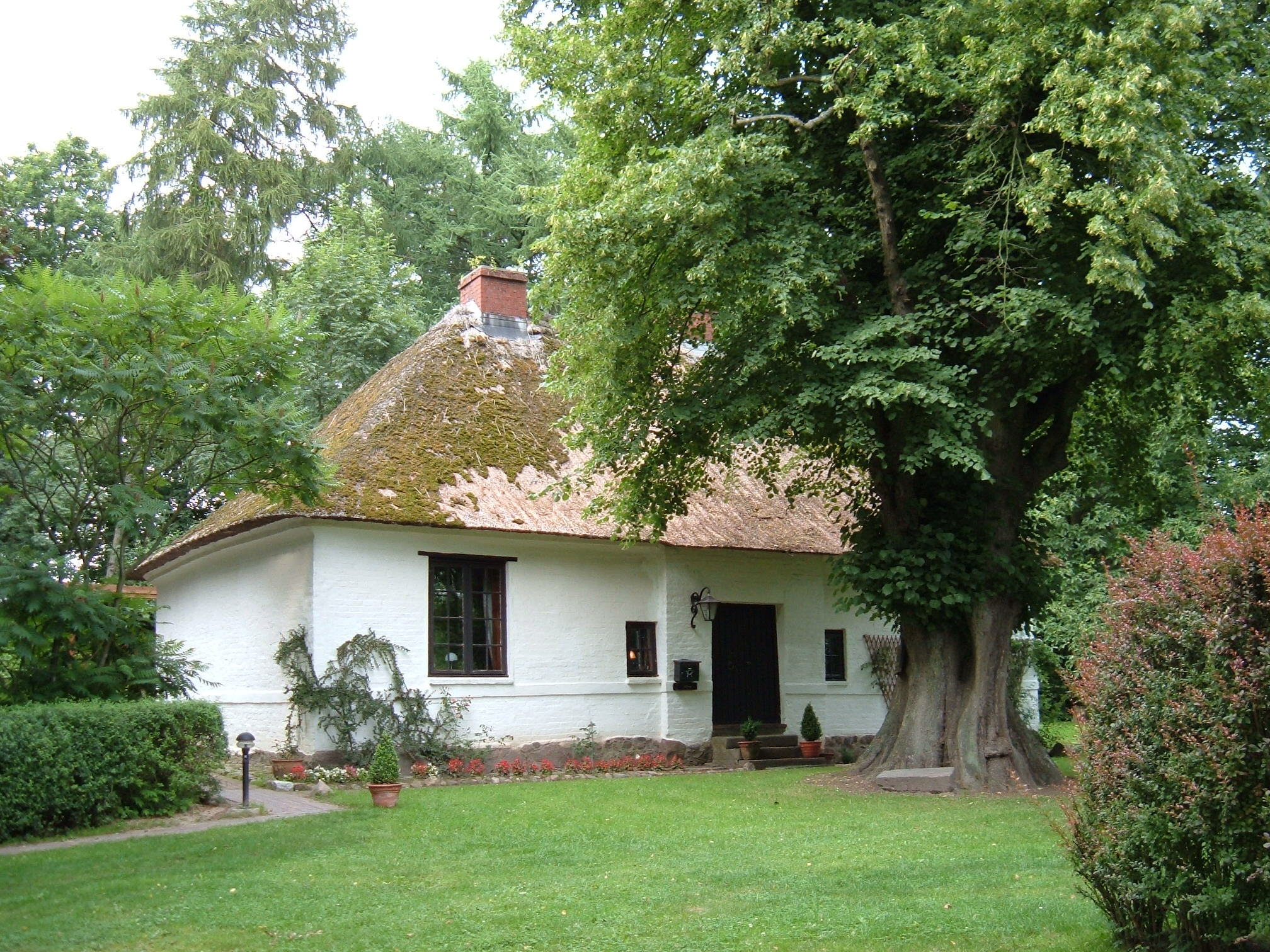
- House that Menno Simons is believed to have worked in

- Coat of arms

- Location of Bad Oldesloe within Stormarn district
- Interactive map of Bad Oldesloe
- Location within Germany Location within Schleswig-Holstein
- Coordinates: 53°48′42″N 10°22′27″E
- Country: Germany
- State: Schleswig-Holstein
- District: Stormarn

Government
  - Mayor: Jörg Lembke

Area
  - Total: 52.59 km^{2} (20.31 sq mi)
- Elevation: 9 m (30 ft)

Population (2025-12-31)
  - Total: 24,981
  - Density: 475.0/km^{2} (1,230/sq mi)
- Time zone: UTC+01:00 (CET)
  - Summer (DST): UTC+02:00 (CEST)
- Postal codes: 23843
- Dialling codes: 04531
- Vehicle registration: OD
- Website: www.badoldesloe.de

Bad Oldesloe (German pronunciation: [ˌbaːt ˈʔɔldəsˌloː]) is a town located in the northern German state of Schleswig-Holstein. It is the capital of the district of Stormarn.

The area has been inhabited since Mesolithic times. The flint tools found here from that era (6000–4500 BC) are clearly defined and known as the Oldesloer Stufe. For a number of years in the 18th century the Moravian Church had a congregation in Bad Oldesloe. It was called "Pilgerruh", i.e. "Pilgrims' Rest". It was given up because of difficulties with the Danish Church authorities. At that time, the Duchy of Holstein was ruled by the kings of Denmark within the Holy Roman Empire.

On 24 April 1945, the town was heavily bombed by Allied forces in the final days of the Second World War in Germany. Three hundred buildings were destroyed, and 706 people were killed as a result of the operation.

== Buildings ==
16th century Mennokate: Memorial for Menno Simons, founder and eponym of the Mennonites, a group of anabaptists. He had some of his works printed in this building.

== Transport ==
Bad Oldesloe station is located on the Lübeck–Hamburg and the Neumünster–Bad Oldesloe railways.

== Notable people ==
- Hermann Olshausen (1796–1839), theologian.
- Otto Wilhelm Sonder (1812–1881), botanist and pharmacist
- Theodor Mommsen (1817–1903), grew up in Bad Oldesloe; classical scholar, historian, jurist, journalist, politician, archaeologist and writer.
- August Mommsen (1821–1913), historian.
- Klaus Bargsten (1911–2000), captain and sole survivor of sunken U-521
- Henning Schwarz (1928–1993), CDU politician
- Isa Genzken (born 1948), sculptor and contemporary artist
- Rüdiger Schmidt-Grépály (born 1952), Cultural Manager at the Klassik Stiftung Weimar
- Katharina Fegebank (born 1977), politician (The Greens)
- Wincent Weiss (born 1993), singer and model

=== Sport ===
- Axel Hager (born 1969), beach volleyball player; won bronze medal at the 2000 Sydney Olympics (grew up in Bad Oldesloe)
- Rouwen Hennings (born 1987), footballer, played over 500 pro games
- Julia Görges (born 1988), tennis player
- Maximilian Ahlschwede (born 1990), footballer, played 300 pro games
- Alexander Meyer (born 1991), footballer, played 230 games
- Dan-Patrick Poggenberg (born 1992), footballer, played 250 pro games
- Dren Feka (born 1997), footballer, played 80 pro games

== Twin towns – sister cities ==
Bad Oldesloe is twinned with:

- Be'er Ya'akov, Israel
- Jifna, Palestine
- Kołobrzeg, Poland
- Olivet, France
