= Büchsenschinken =

- Stadtteil of Reinbek
- Interactive map of Büchsenschinken
- Location within Germany Location within Schleswig-Holstein
- Coordinates: 53°33′37″N 10°17′09.6″E
- Country: Germany
- State: Schleswig-Holstein
- District: Stormarn
- Town: Reinbek

Area
  - Total: 0.328 km^{2} (0.127 sq mi)

Population (2016-12-31)
  - Total: 237
  - Density: 723/km^{2} (1,870/sq mi)
- Time zone: UTC+01:00 (CET)
  - Summer (DST): UTC+02:00 (CEST)
- Postal codes: 21465
- Dialling codes: 04104
- Vehicle registration: OD
- Website: https://www.buechsenschinken.de (archived)

Büchsenschinken is a district of the city Reinbek in the northern German state of Schleswig-Holstein. It was first settled by Johann Daniel Witten in 1825 as a small stop in the route between Hamburg and Mölln. The settlement has historically always been part of Ohe, never constituting its own municipality. When Ohe was integrated into Reinbek during a 1974 territorial reform, Büchsenschinken was as well.

Büchsenschinken is home to the Hof Büchsenschinken horse stable as well as a small settlement of around 200 people.

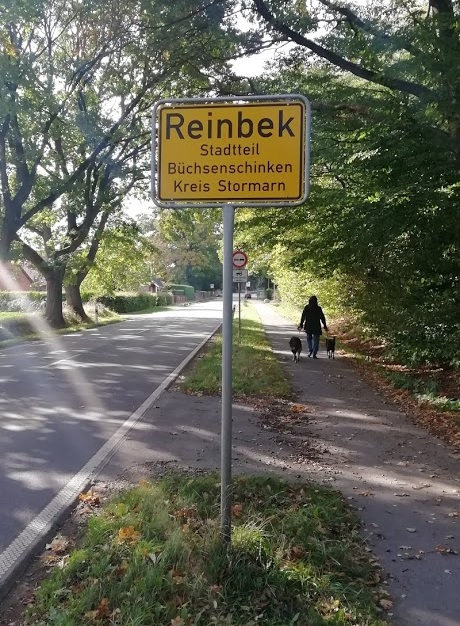
Town sign of Büchsenschinken

== History ==
Büchsenschinken was first settled by Johann Daniel Witten from Witzhave in 1825 after he was granted permission by the office of Reinbek to build a timber-framed house in the area. When he acquired a license to distribute alcohol a few years later, his property developed into the inn Gasthof Büchsenschinken, a popular stop in the route between Hamburg and Mölln. The inn, which was maintained by his descendens, ceased operation in 2005 and was demolished in 2008.

The small settlement consisted exclusively of the Witten family until 1945.

Büchsenschinken was included in the formation of the municipality of Ohe in 1867, which it stayed a part of until Ohe was fully integrated Reinbek during a 1974 territorial reform.

== Trivia ==
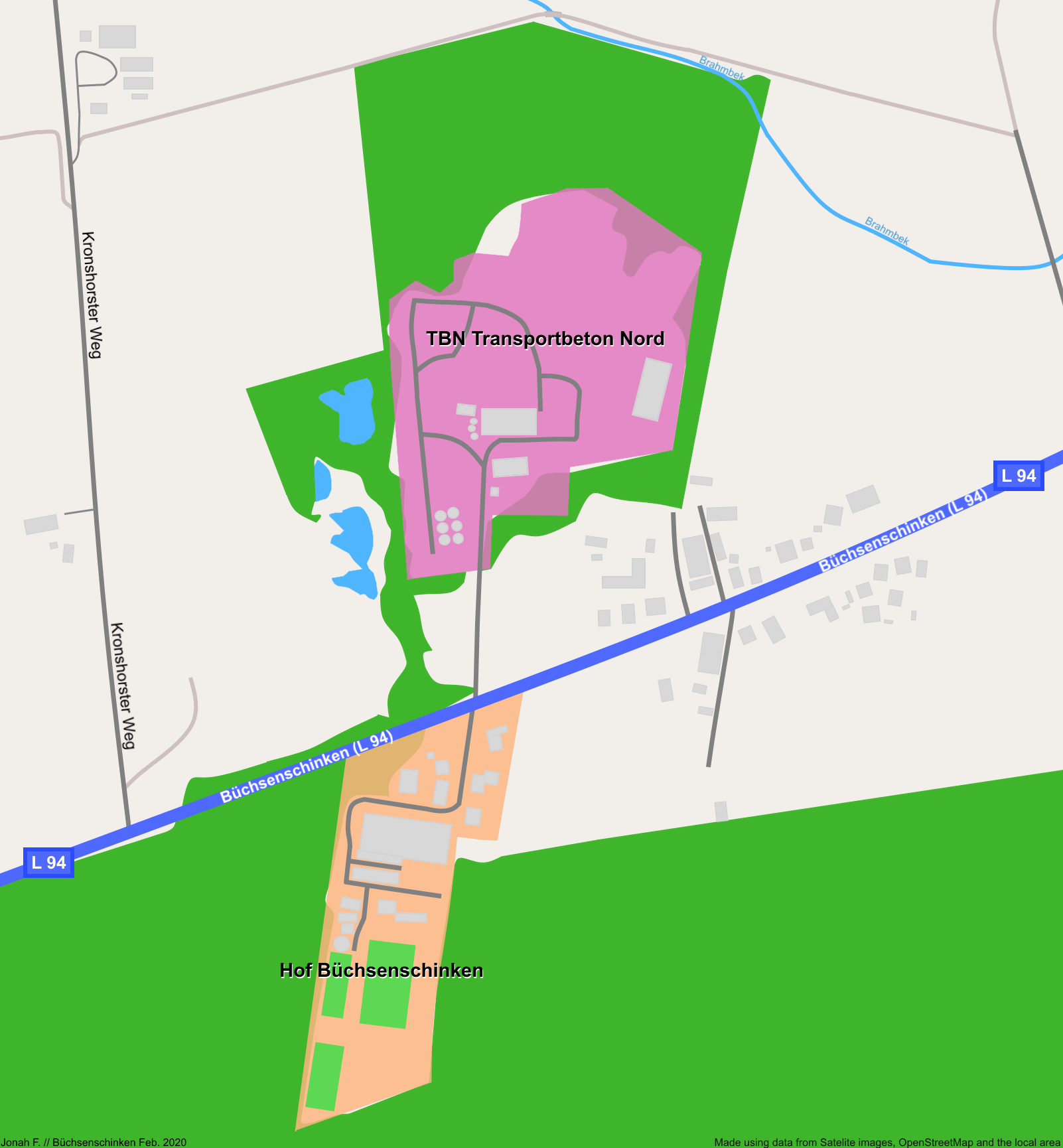
Map of Büchsenschinken

The name "Büchsenschinken" means literally "canned ham". Nothing seems to be known about the origin of the name.
