= Johann Daniel Witten =

German pioneer

- Born: February 15, 1791; Witzhave, Duchy of Saxe-Lauenburg, Holy Roman Empire
- Died: Büchsenschinken
- Known for: Founding of Büchsenschinken
- Children: 1

Johann Daniel Witten (15 February 1791 – after 1865) was the founder of the village of Büchsenschinken in Reinbek, Germany.

He was drafted into the Danish military and stationed in Altona in 1815 due to the Napoleonic wars, during which he was wounded.

In 1825, Witten purchased empty land in Northern Germany, which later became known as Büchsenschinken, and was granted permission by the office of Reinbek to build a timber-framed house, which also acted as a farm, during the same year. A few years later, he was granted permission to distribute alcohol at his property. At that point, his property had become a stop along the route from Hamburg to Mölln, and the inn, Gasthof Büchsenschinken, was established by his son Heinrich-Otto Witten. The inn was in operation until 2005, and was demolished in 2008.
