= Reinbek Castle =

Castle in Reinbek

Coordinates: 53.5073°N 10.2542°E

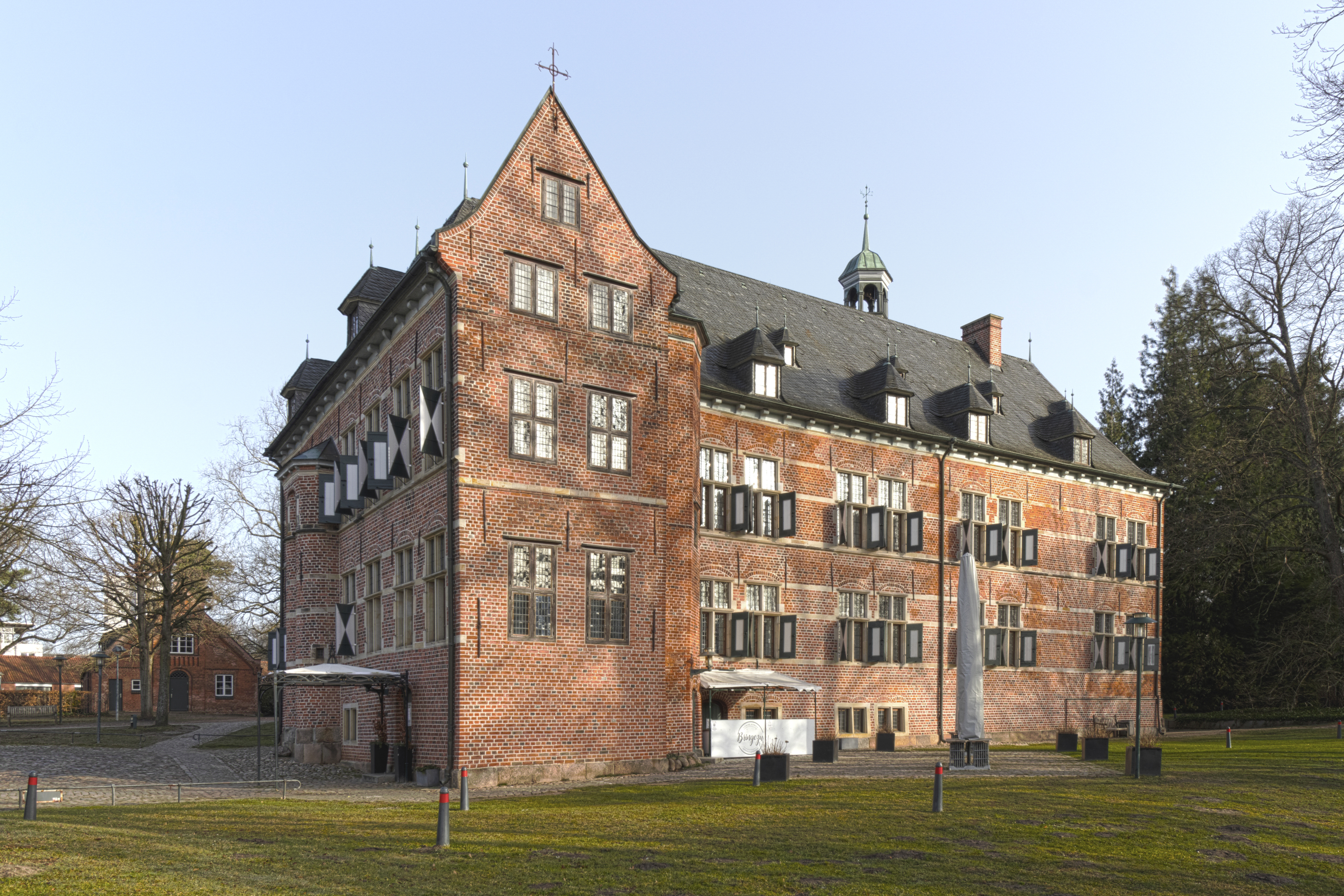
View of the south wing of the palace from the garden

Reinbek Castle (German: Schloss Reinbek), located in Reinbek in southern Schleswig-Holstein, was built in the 16th century as a secondary residence for the ducal house of Schleswig-Holstein-Gottorf. It is one of the oldest buildings from the reign of Duke Adolf I and is regarded as the best example of the Renaissance style in Schleswig-Holstein. The castle was restored from 1977 to 1987 and now serves as an art and cultural center for the town of Reinbek.

== History ==
=== Prehistory of the castle grounds ===
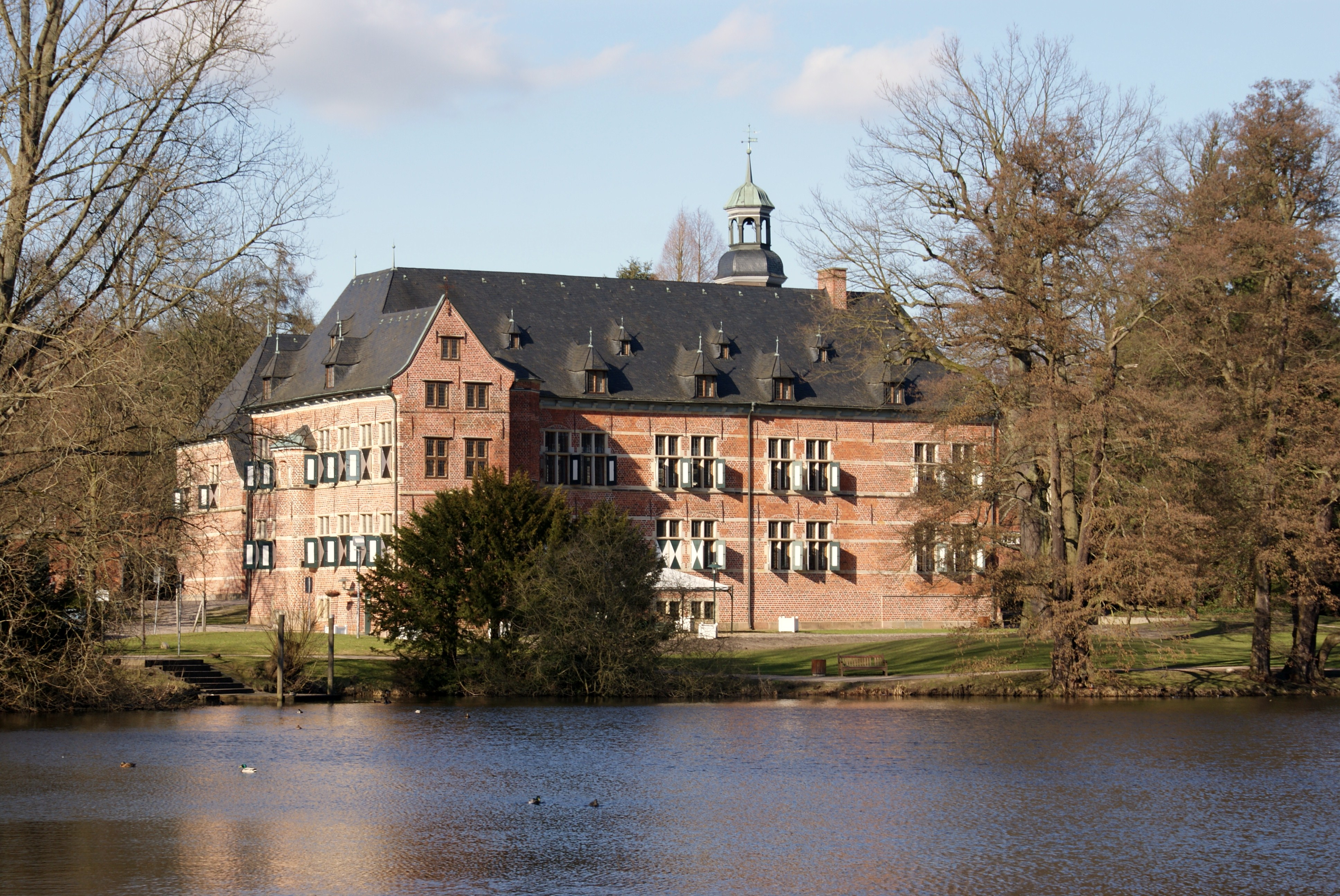
View over the mill pond to the south wing

The Reinbek monastery, a convent of Cistercian nuns, had stood on the site of the current castle since 1250. However, it was deactivated in 1528 during the Reformation. The Danish King Frederick I purchased the monastery buildings and land for 12,000 Lübische Marks. Unfortunately, the monastery complex was affected by the Count's Feud in 1534, which caused unrest. Like many Danish properties, it was looted and set on fire by troops from Lübeck during this conflict.

In 1544, a succession treaty came into force, as a result of which the newly crowned Danish King Christian III gave part of his territories to his younger half-brothers John II and Adolf I. This geographical division led to the creation of two new duchies: the Duchy of Schleswig-Holstein-Hadersleben, which only lasted for a short time, and the Duchy of Schleswig-Holstein-Gottorf. Adolf I, the youngest brother, became the first duke of the Gottorf territory, which included the Reinbek lands. As a result, Reinbek formed an exclave within Adolf I's fragmented territory, primarily in northern Schleswig.

Adolf I spent little time at his new court in Gottorf Castle during the initial years of his reign, which began when he was eighteen years old. Instead, he undertook various roles and ventures. He served Emperor Charles V, participated as a military commander in the Schmalkaldic War, and fought for England against the Netherlands. Adolf I even pursued a marriage proposal to the English Queen Elizabeth I, which was turned down. He eventually married Christine of Hesse at the age of 38 and had numerous children. After renovating Gottorf Castle, Duke Adolf also commissioned the construction of Reinbek, Husum, Tönning, and Trittau castles.

=== Time of the Gottorf Dukes ===
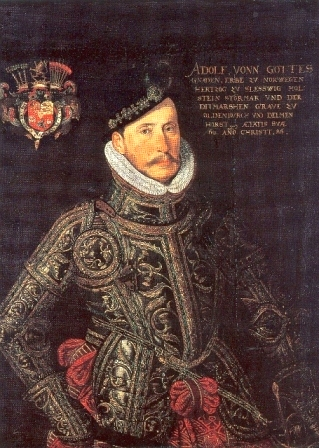
The builder of the castle, Duke Adolf I of Schleswig-Holstein-Gottorf

Reinbek Castle was built for Duke Adolf from 1572 to 1576. Its purpose was to serve as a secondary residence for the duke when he traveled to the Reinbek and Trittau districts. The castle also functioned as a hunting lodge since large par force hunts were organized annually in the nearby Sachsenwald forest. Additionally, it operated as guesthouse for individuals coming from regions located south of Schleswig-Holstein, saving them the trip to Gottorf. While there was no permanent court at the castle, a castellan managed its affairs in the duke's absence, along with a team of servants. The castle grounds included various outbuildings such as a grain distillery, brewery, barns, and stables. It also featured a kitchen garden and fish ponds. The administration of the Gottorf exclave was primarily handled by bailiffs who were stationed at Reinbek Castle in 1646, assuming the duties of the castellan as well.

Following Duke Adolf’s demise, the castle was given dowry status and operated as a residence for the ducal widows. It was used by Christine of Hesse and after the death of Johann Adolf, it served Augusta of Denmark as an occasional residence. The duchess also made some extensions to the castle around 1620, such as the castle chapel, which was destroyed in 1901. After her death, the castle served as a hunting lodge, as well as a venue for larger events. Moritz of Saxony, Johann VI of Anhalt-Zerbst, and Johann Georg II of Anhalt-Dessau were among the house guests at this time. During the Thirty Years' War, the castle was occupied first by Swedish and later by imperial troops but escaped looting and destruction.

As a result of the Great Northern War, the House of Schleswig-Holstein-Gottorf suffered a defeat in 1713 and the possessions in the Duchy of Schleswig were completely annexed by the Danish royal house. Only the territories in the Duchy of Holstein remained in Gottorf's possession. The ducal family, previously residing in Kiel Castle, experienced a decline in influence. A few years later, the duchy was integrated into the Russian Tsarist dynasty through a personal union with Peter III. Johanna Elisabeth of Schleswig-Holstein-Gottorf, who was the mother of Catherine the Great, traveled to Russia as the Countess of Reinbek, intending to spend her old age at the palace. However, the palace no longer played an important role as a courtly residence. While repairs were made to the bailiffs' residence, which remained operational, the building itself became outdated and was no longer modernized.

=== Royal Danish dominion ===
In 1773, as a result of the Treaty of Tsarskoye Selo, the castle became Danish property. While the castle remained an official residence, there was a significant change in personnel. Officials who formerly served under the ducal administration and in Russian service now became employees of the Danish royal family. However, visits by the royal family became infrequent, and the castle became essentially an administrative building rather than a residence.

Reinbek Castle had deteriorated and required repairs by the late 18th to early 19th centuries. Around 1776, J. A. Richter conducted minor repairs. However, due to constant costs and repairs, the castle's suitability as an administrative seat was questioned, and there were discussions about demolishing it. The Danish Chamber of Pensions, the financial authority responsible for the castle, even suggested constructing a new building using the materials from the demolition. The potential demolition plans were not limited to Reinbek Castle alone. During the consolidation of the Danish state, several castles in Schleswig-Holstein came under the ownership of the Danish royal family and were demolished for political and economic reasons. This included the destruction of Reinfeld, Trittau, and Ahrensbök castles. In 1818, a government architect named Christian Frederik Hansen provided an expert opinion that helped to stop the planned demolition of Reinbek Castle. However, plans for a reconstruction by Friedrich Christian Heylmann, which aimed to shorten and visually align the side wings of the castle, were not pursued further, and the castle remained in its original state.

=== From the Prussian period to the 20th century ===
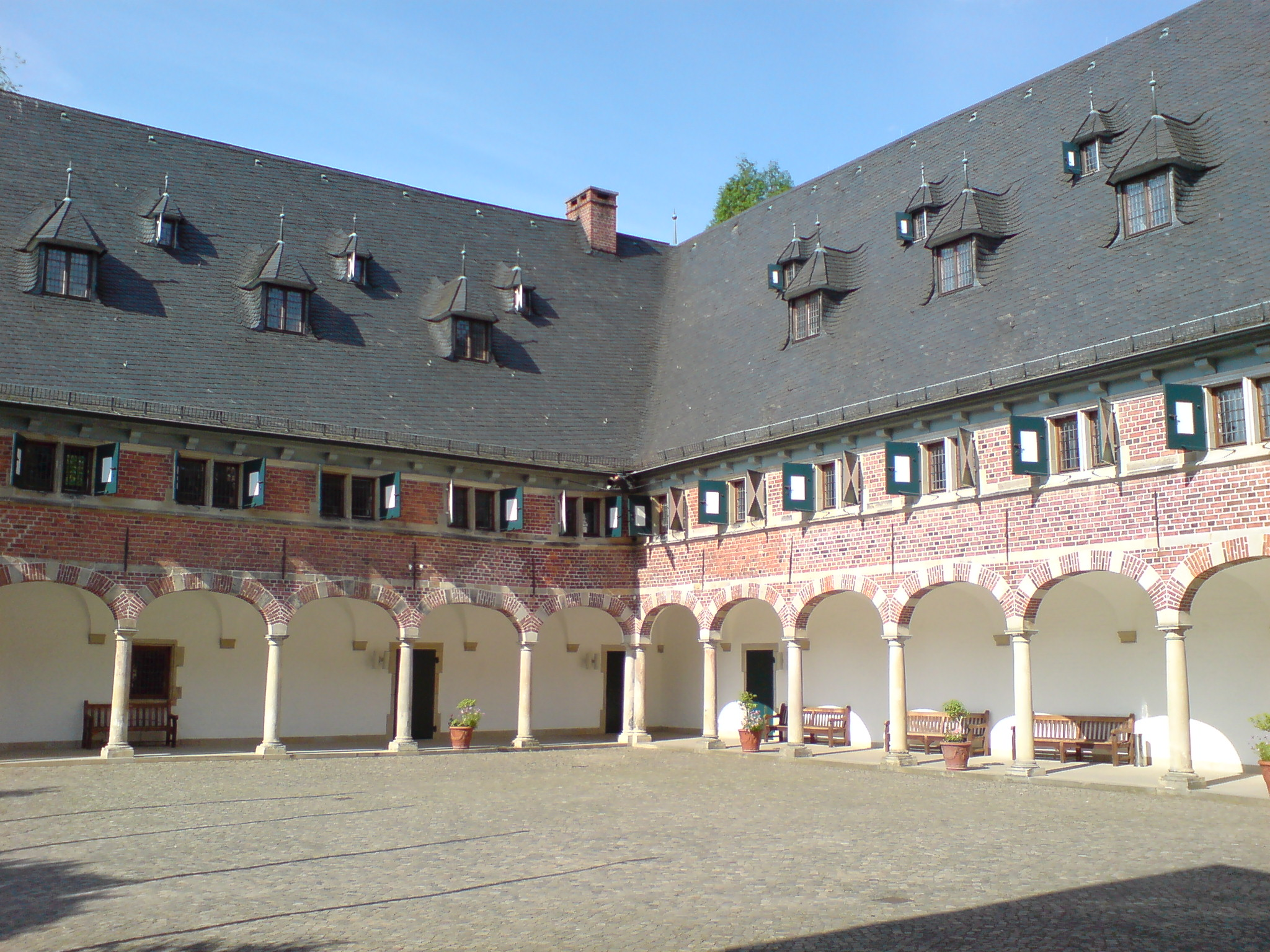
The arcades were walled up in the 19th century and reconstructed in the 20th century.

Following the German-Danish War and the subsequent German War, the Duchy of Holstein came under Prussian control in 1866. The Reinbek office was integrated into the Prussian district of Stormarn, and the castle briefly served as the seat for the district administrator. However, in 1873, the office was relocated to Wandsbek, and the castle was handed over to the Prussian tax authorities. They auctioned off the property in 1874. It was purchased by the Specht family for 25,000 thalers, but they sold it shortly thereafter. The new owners remodeled and transformed the castle into a hotel, disregarding its historical structure. The castle functioned as a hotel until the end of the First World War.

Margarete von Patow purchased the castle from the Specht family in 1919 and transformed it into the Pniel Christian vacation home. After twenty years, the baroness sold the castle once again, and the new owner became the city of Hamburg. The Reichsinstitut für Forstwirtschaft (Reich Institute for Forestry), later known as the Bundesforschungsanstalt für Forst- und Holzwirtschaft (Federal Research Institute for Forestry and Timber), was housed in the castle from 1939. Remarkably, the castle remained undamaged during the Second World War and served as a temporary shelter for refugees from the German eastern territories in the post-war period. The institute gradually relocated from Reinbek over the second half of the 20th century, resulting in the castle being put up for sale for the third time. In 1972, the district of Stormarn and the town of Reinbek jointly purchased the building. Under the guidance of Horst von Bassewitz, the castle underwent a comprehensive restoration from 1977 to 1987, aiming to restore it to its condition from the first half of the 17th century. Since then, the castle has been available for public use and serves as a cultural and historical site.

=== The castle in the present ===
As a cultural center, Reinbek Castle is accessible through numerous events throughout the year. It can also be visited from Wednesdays to Sundays from 10 am to 5 pm.

The castle premises are open for public visits to a large extent, although they are only partially equipped as museums due to their modern use. The exhibited pieces include furniture, paintings, and tapestries from the Renaissance period. The former kitchen rooms and the spacious attic, known as the "Krummspanner," are utilized for changing exhibitions. The castle hosts various events such as the Schleswig-Holstein Music Festival, which takes place annually, and the arts and crafts fair held in the adjacent castle park during the summer. The castle administration also rents out the atmospheric rooms for conferences, receptions, and celebrations. Additionally, the Gottorf Room offers the opportunity for couples to get married on Fridays. In 1977, the association "Freunde des Schlosses Reinbek e.V." (Friends of Reinbek Castle) was established. This non-profit organization is dedicated to promoting the castle and the castle park as a cultural and communication center, encouraging their active and diverse utilization.

From 2009 to 2013, it hosted the annual Reinbek Economic Conference Afghanistan, an international conference on economic reconstruction in Afghanistan. The castle also serves as a filming location for the show Lieb & Teuer.

=== Castle building ===
Reinbek Castle was built from 1572 to 1576 by the order of Duke Adolf I. It holds the distinction of being the first purely residential building without fortifications in northern Elbia. The design of the castle features a horseshoe-shaped ground plan, which was considered innovative for its time and influenced by French architectural models like the Écouen Castle. However, while the structure appears uniform, it lacks symmetrical division and proportions. The central wing is flanked by shorter side wings to the north and south, enclosing a courtyard of honor. An additional bar-like extension is located at the end of the south wing.

The floor area of the building in its largest extension is 51×36 meters, the courtyard is 26 meters wide. The castle consists of two habitable floors, along with a basement and a high attic. Its roof construction is distinctive: the gable roof, covered with slate, slopes down to a lower level on the north and east wings, creating the illusion of a one-and-a-half-story structure in those areas. The stair tower in the courtyard, which features an elegantly designed openwork hood, was once the only connection between the floors. Additional stair towers were later added to the south wing during the early 17th century under Duchess Augusta.

==== Stylistic classification ====
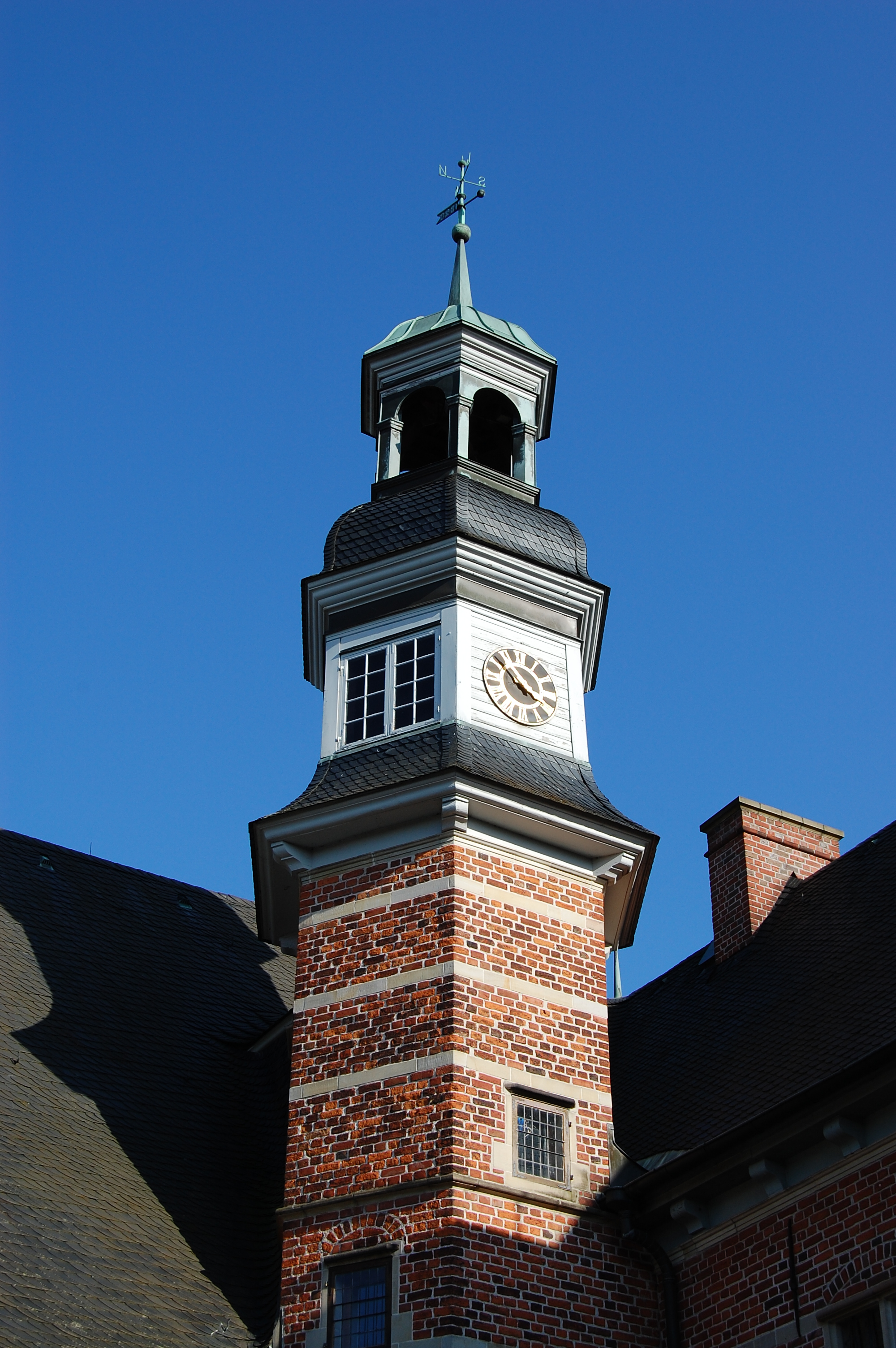
The stair tower. Husum Castle and Trittau Castle in the Hofwinkels also had similar towers.

The castle was one of the most modern structures in Schleswig and Holstein when it was completed. It had three wings and an open arched courtyard. However, the courtyard used to be enclosed by a wall, separating it from the farmyard. This architecture was different from the traditional ducal noble homes, which were typically made up of multiple houses or closed four-winged complexes.

The master builder of the castle is unknown, but it is believed that Hercules Oberberg or Peter of Maastricht may have been involved in the design. The castle follows the style of the Dutch Renaissance, which Duke Adolf became familiar with during his frequent local travels. It is made of red brick masonry, and the facades have horizontal sandstone bands. The window frames are also made of sandstone and feature stone crosses, with wooden shutters on the sides. One unique architectural feature in this region is the courtyard's arcade, which is made up of Tuscan columns and connects the rooms of the north and east wings on the first floor.

Reinbek Castle was built before Husum Castle. Both castles were built by Duke Adolf from 1577 to 1582, with the help of Dutch craftsmen. They share a modern three-winged layout and are made of brick with decorative sandstone elements. While Reinbek Castle has a relatively plain design, Husum Castle was designed to be more grand and symmetrical, featuring multiple towers. Husum Castle, on the contrary, underwent significant reconstruction work that simplified its structure. As a result, Reinbek Castle now represents the more original state of a Renaissance building than Husum Castle.

Reinbek Castle also served as a model for the castle in neighboring Trittau, which was also commissioned by Duke Adolf in 1581.The Nordic Renaissance design of Trittau Castle, which was built as the replacement for a medieval moated castle, resembles to the design of Reinbek. It also has a stair tower in the courtyard corner. The castle in Trittau was demolished at the end of the 18th century.

==== Conversions and restoration ====
During the 19th century, the exterior of the palace underwent a significant transformation, resulting in profound remodeling. One notable alteration concerned the palace courtyard. In 1874, during the conversion of the palace into a hotel, a neo-Gothic porch with an entrance hall was added in front of the central wing. This addition gave the palace an approximately E-shaped floor plan in addition to serving as a spacious stairway. The eastern stair tower on the south wing was demolished, and the courtyard arcades were sealed, creating an interior corridor connecting the first-floor rooms. Further modifications included the replacement of stone window frames and cross with wooden frames, as well as the substitution of slate roofing with roof tiles, which reduced the overall height of the roof. Additionally, at the dawn of the 20th century, the castle chapel was abandoned and transformed into new rooms through the installation of partition walls.

Between 1977 and 1987, extensive restoration efforts were undertaken to revert the modifications and return the castle to its original state during Duchess Augusta's era. These measures aimed to recreate the castle's historical appearance. At that time the restoration project incurred estimated costs of approximately DM 10,000,000. The restoration was financed with the help of the federal government as well as the states of Hamburg and Schleswig-Holstein.

In its present form, the castle is the best-preserved example of a noble residence in the style of the Dutch Renaissance in Schleswig-Holstein.

=== Interiors ===
==== Continuous reconstruction of the interior of the castle ====
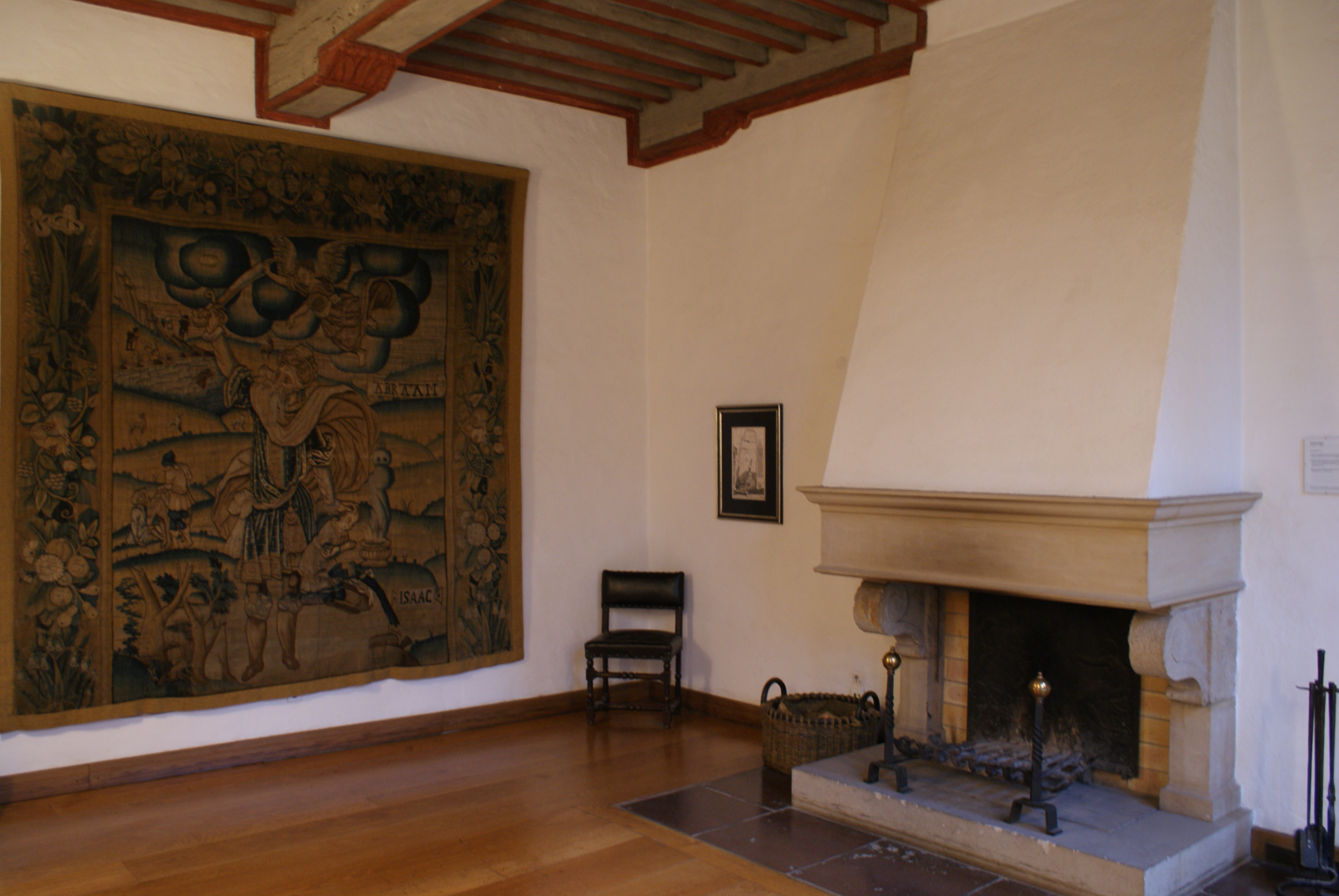
The small fireplace room represents a reconstructed Renaissance room.

The three-wing layout of the palace defied the later Baroque understanding of space, which typically featured a central banqueting hall and symmetrical apartments. Instead, Reinbek Castle followed functional principles, with the southern wing housing the grand banqueting and court halls, along with the former castle chapel in its annex from the early 17th century. The middle wing served as guest apartments, while the northern wing encompassed the court kitchen and utility rooms. Access to the rooms in the north and east wings was provided through the courtyard arcade and a gallery beneath the knee wall, representing a modern innovation in castle construction in Schleswig-Holstein. In 1589, the court artist Jacob van der Wordt adorned the rooms with ornate paintings. When Duchess Augusta resided in the palace, she commissioned the addition of a palace chapel in the south wing's annex and the construction of two additional stair towers to complement the existing one in the courtyard. Ornamental motifs were painted on the oak ceilings, adorning nearly every area of the castle.

While the exterior of the castle remained relatively unchanged until the 19th century, significant additions and alterations were consistently made to the interior. During the 18th century, the oak ceilings were concealed under vaulted structures, and the room layout underwent partial redistribution, particularly to accommodate its use as a hotel. While at the beginning of the 18th century, twenty-four rooms were recorded in the inventory lists, the castle expanded to approximately seventy rooms by 1974, owing to the creation of smaller rooms through the introduction of room divisions and partition walls. The castle chapel was closed in 1901 and expanded by 1904; some of the furnishings were transferred to the Maria Magdalena Church in Reinbek.

==== Restoration in the 20th century ====
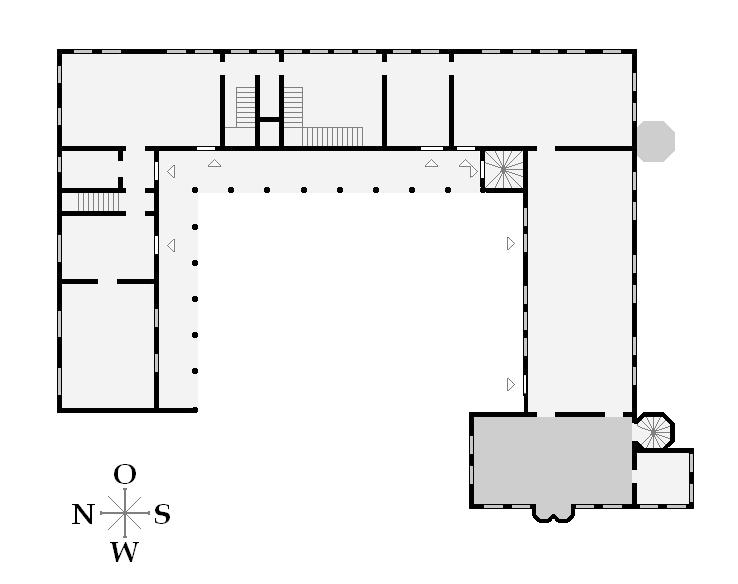
Floor plan of the ground floor, current condition. The location of the former palace chapel and the demolished stair tower are marked.

During the restoration of the castle, a balance had to be made between the preservation of the historical building fabric and the future use of the building as a cultural center. While the exterior of the palace was predominantly restored to its Renaissance condition, certain modifications had to be accepted to accommodate the new function of the interior spaces, particularly since the original layouts and uses of the rooms could not be fully reconstructed. Following the demolition of the historicist staircase wing, the inclusion of a modern staircase became necessary to complement the existing spiral staircases, which were installed in the elongated central building. Additionally, an elevator system was implemented to enhance accessibility. A tea kitchen was introduced to cater to the conference guests, while the reconstruction of the castle chapel was omitted, and the space was instead leased to the castle catering service. Furthermore, the high attic area was transformed into an exhibition space. Any remaining historical traces were carefully preserved and elaborated upon, with special attention given to the painted beamed ceilings found in numerous rooms.

The Court Hall and the Ballroom above the south wing are still the largest rooms in the palace, having been built during the restoration phase. The so-called Hunting Room and the Garden Hall are also based on earlier designs. The common feature among all of the rooms is that they all have modern fixtures that support the cultural center's present uses while also being complemented with furniture that is stylistically contemporary.

=== Castle grounds ===
==== The former farmyard ====
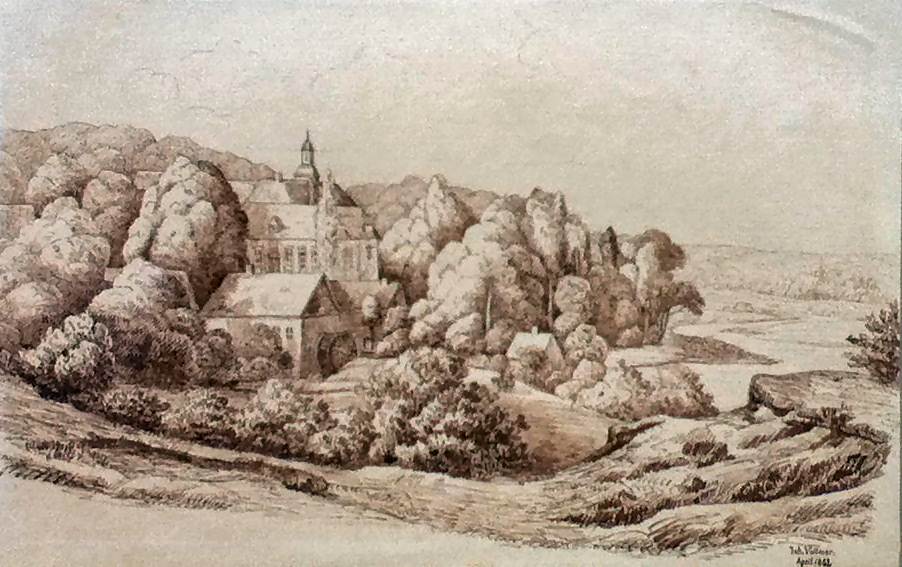
The palace park in 1862 pen drawing by Johannes Vollmer

The castle was built in the center of the former monastery grounds. The main building of the monastery complex was located a few steps west of the castle, but there are no visible traces of the buildings today. Simultaneously, an extensive farmyard was built, the so-called Vorwerk, which was equipped with stables, granaries, and cattle stables and served to supply the castle residents. Today there are no buildings of these buildings either, they were demolished in the 19th century and partly replaced by new buildings. The courtyard area also had to be reduced in size when the northern railroad line of the Berlin-Hamburg Railway was built.

==== Castle garden ====
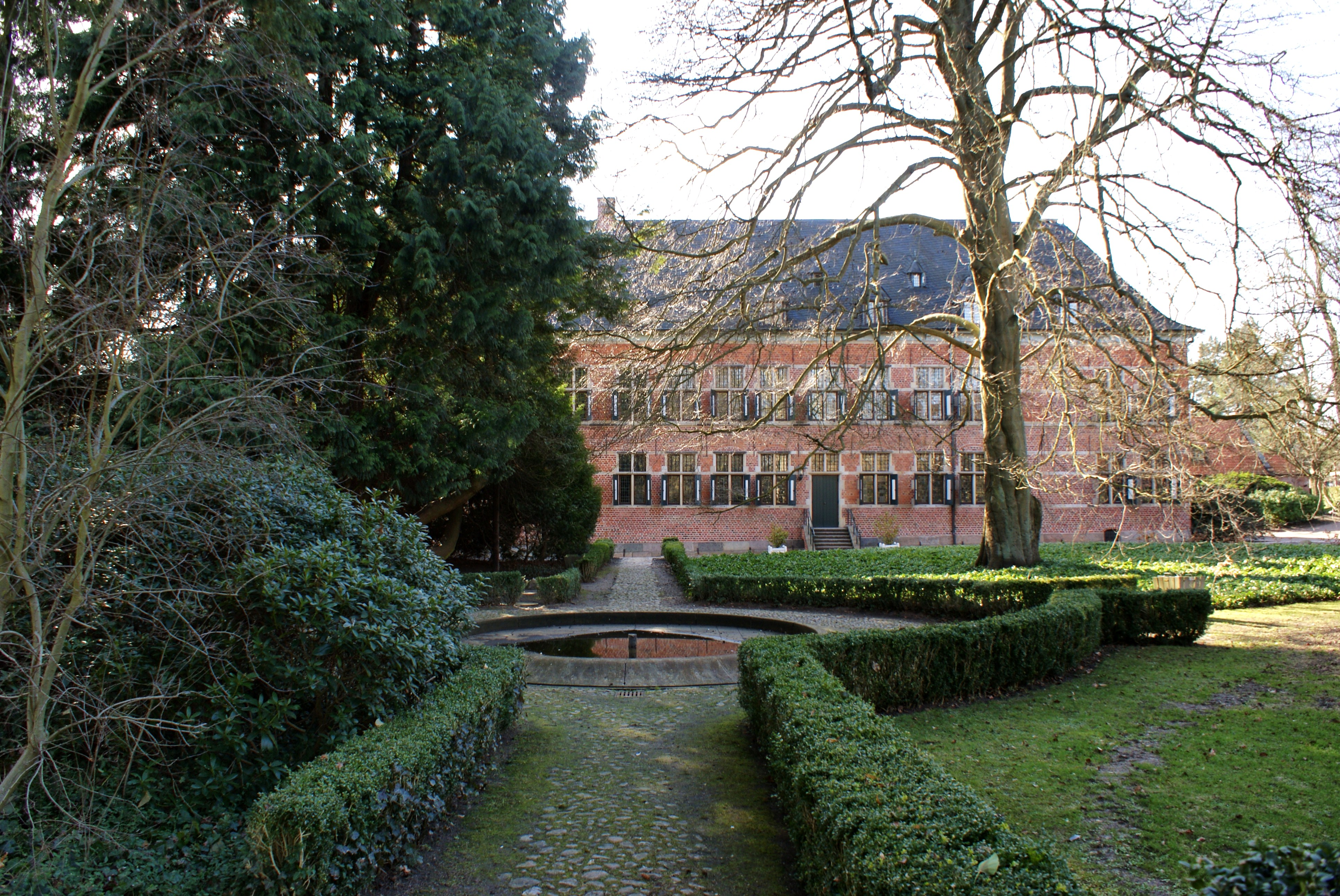
View through the garden to the east wing of the palace

The castle sits right on the Bille River, which has been dammed to form a mill pond. The surrounding park once served as both the kitchen garden and the pleasure garden of the palace and was already laid out under Duke Adolf. The actual pleasure garden was placed behind the main wing and consisted of nine individual planted compartments (a demarcated planting area in a Baroque garden) connected by arcades and decorated with sandstone figures. The garden featured a pleasure house, a small bathhouse built by Duchess Augusta, and a boat for the ducal family moored in the mill pond. The garden existed until the 18th century when its main features were modestly baroque-styled. At the end of the 18th century, the Royal Chamber of Pensions authorized the leasing of parts of the garden property. The garden areas close to the castle lost their old shape due to negligent maintenance and were transformed into a landscape park in the course of the 19th century, but this was done without a plan or concept. (Note: All information from this paragraph is taken from the extensive work of Helga de Cuveland: Der Reinbeker Schloßgarten, Wachholtz Neumünster, 1996.)

With the restoration of the palace in the 20th century, the question of reconstructing the gardens also arose. It had to be noted that some parts of the former castle area had been built in the meantime and a railroad line ran north of the site in the meantime. A reconstruction of the Renaissance garden seemed too costly, especially since there were no more remains to be integrated. Instead, Reinbek Castle Park was freely redesigned and separated into three parts, all of which serve public use. The garden south of the castle up to the mill pond was designed in the manner of English landscape gardens, albeit on a small scale. A garden was laid out east of the palace, in front of the main wing which in its four-part design is reminiscent of the former formal garden, but elaborate flower planting was eliminated. To the northeast of the palace, a small botanical garden was built.
