= Schwarze Au =

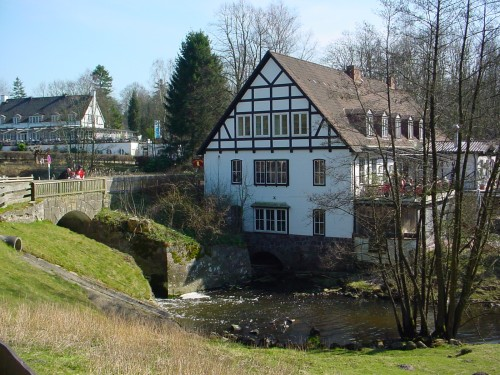

Location
- Country: Germany
- States: Schleswig-Holstein

Physical characteristics
- Mouth
  - location: Bille
  - coordinates: 53.5313°N 10.3073°E

Basin features
- Progression: Bille→ Elbe→ North Sea

Schwarze Au (German pronunciation: [ˈʃvaʁt͡sə ˈaʊ̯]) is a river of Schleswig-Holstein, Germany. It flows into the Bille in Aumühle.

== See also ==
- List of rivers of Schleswig-Holstein
