= Bille (Elbe) =

River in Germany

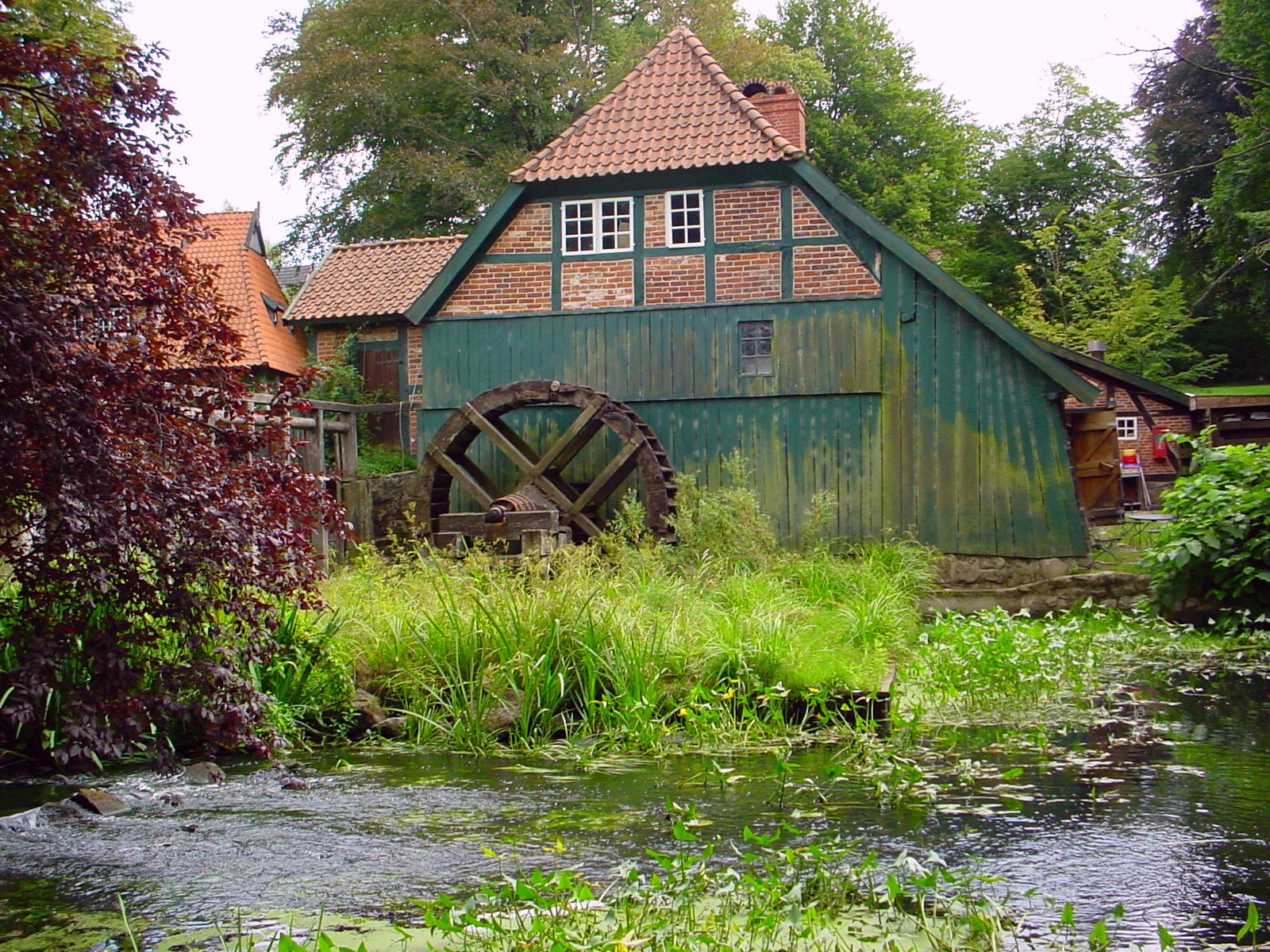
- Bille at Grander Mühle

Location
- Country: Germany

Physical characteristics
- Source
  - location: Schleswig-Holstein
- Mouth
  - location: Elbe
  - coordinates: 53°32′24″N 10°1′27″E
- Length: 65 km (213,000 ft)

Basin features
- Progression: Elbe→ North Sea

The river Bille (German pronunciation: [ˈbɪlə]) is a small, slow-flowing German river in Stormarn, Schleswig-Holstein and Hamburg, a right tributary of the Elbe. Its source is near Linau, north of the Hahnheide forest. It then flows south of Trittau, representing the border between Stormarn and Lauenburg, continues south of Reinbek and reaches the river Elbe near Billwerder. A lot of old estates and tasteful parks are laid out along its riverbank. Its total length is 65 km. Sections of the Bille which flow near or inside the Sachsenwald forest are protected by the Billetal nature reserve.

The Bille is one of three rivers which flow through the city of Hamburg, the other two being the Elbe and the Alster.

== Tributaries ==
The upper Bille drains a wide catchment area with many brooks and small stretches of water. Main tributaries are the Corbek feeding the Bille near Witzhave and the Schwarze Au at Aumühle, having drained wide parts of the large Sachsenwald forest.

== Gallery ==
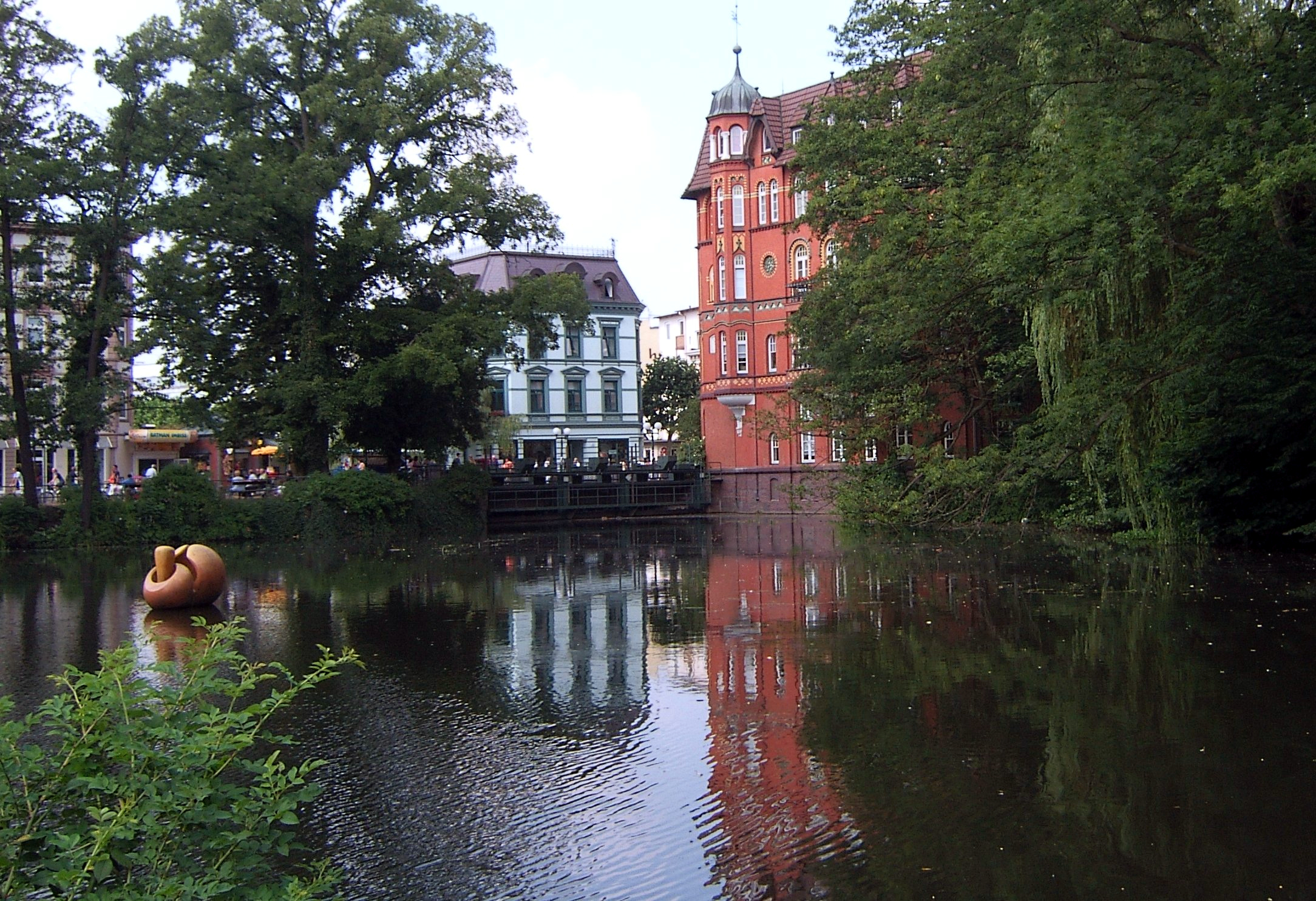
Bille in Hamburg-Bergedorf

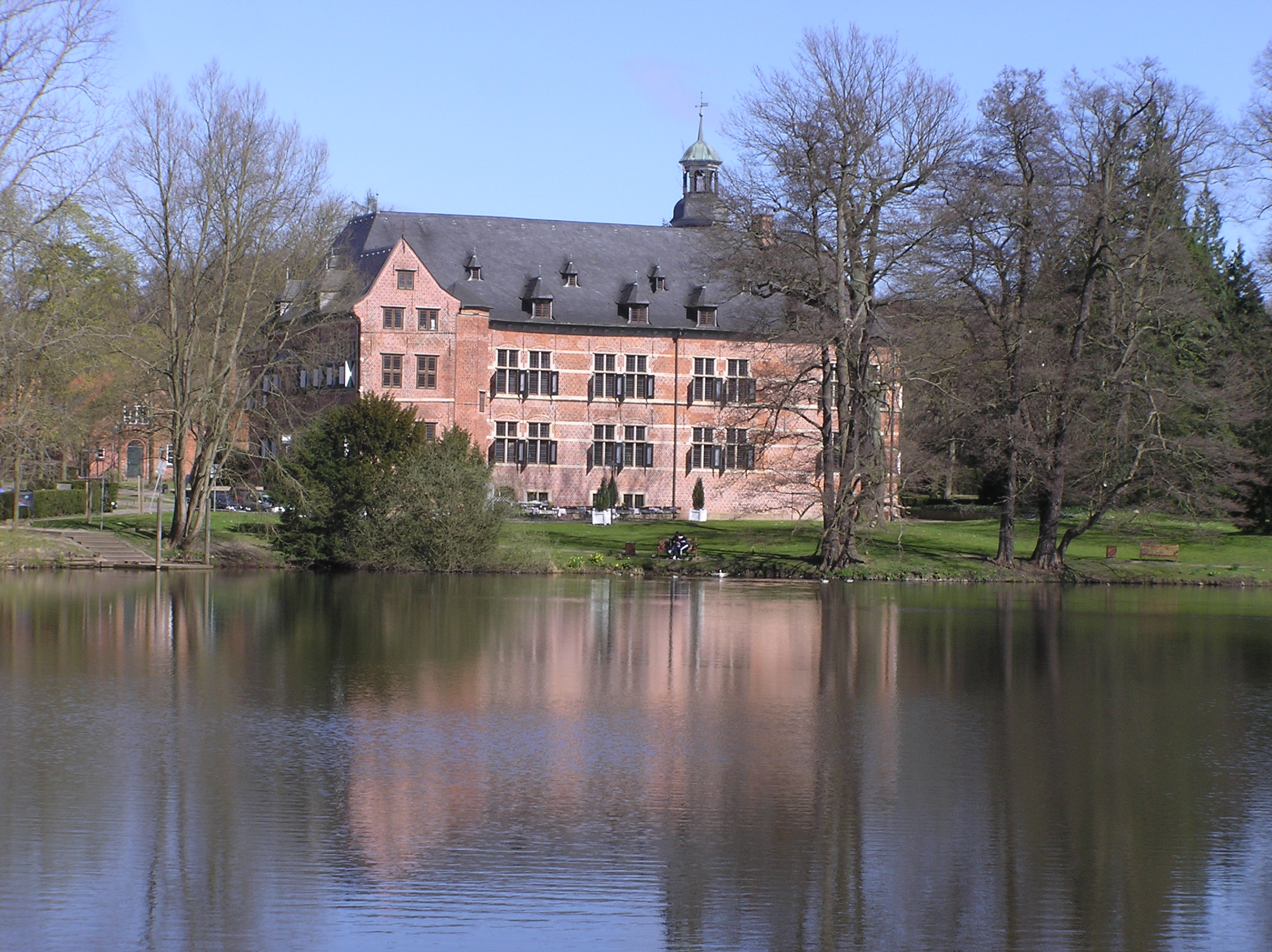
Bille at Schloss Reinbek (Mühlenteich)

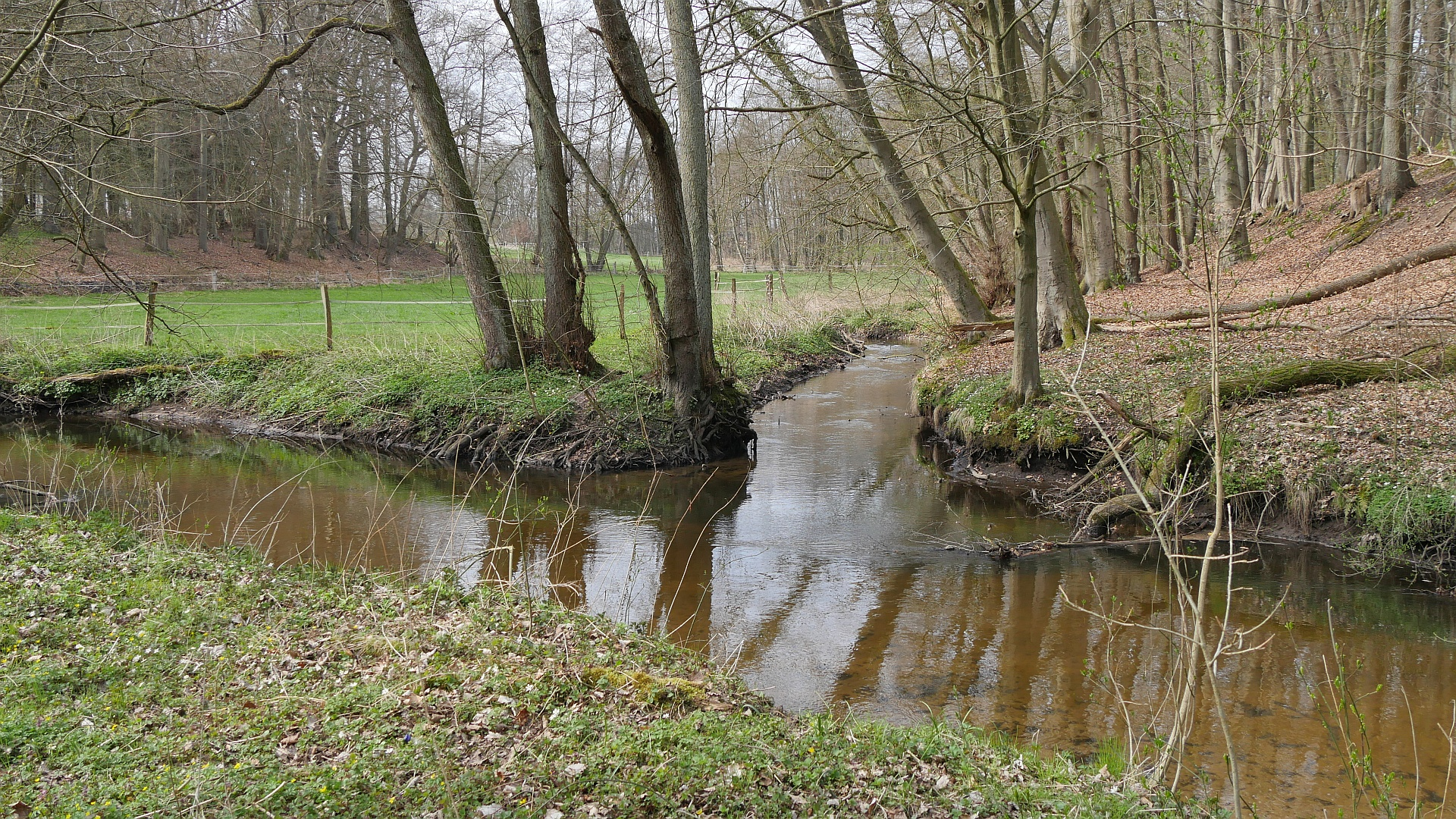
Corbek diverging from the Bille in the Billetal near Witzhave

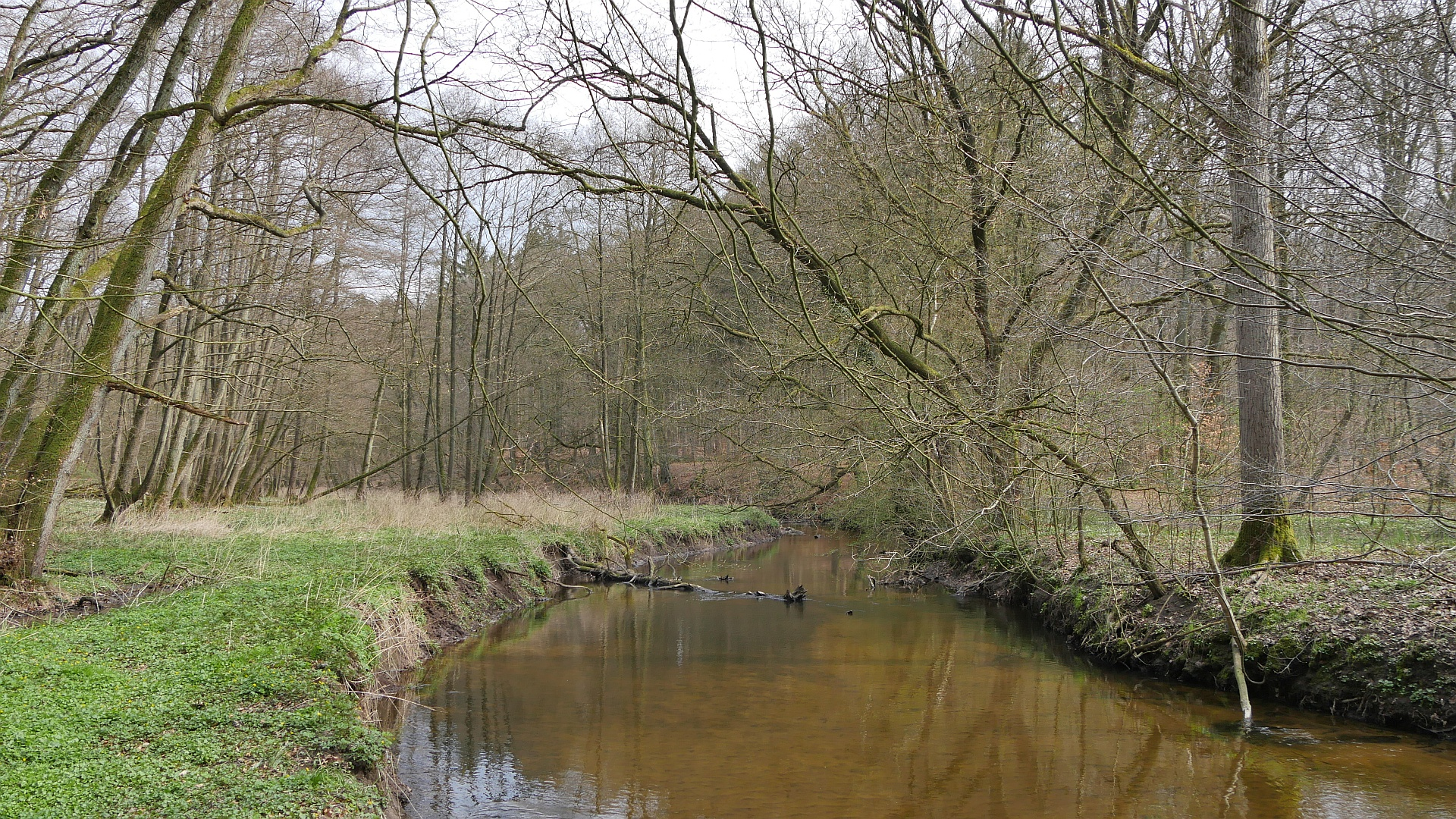
Bille in the Billetal near Witzhave

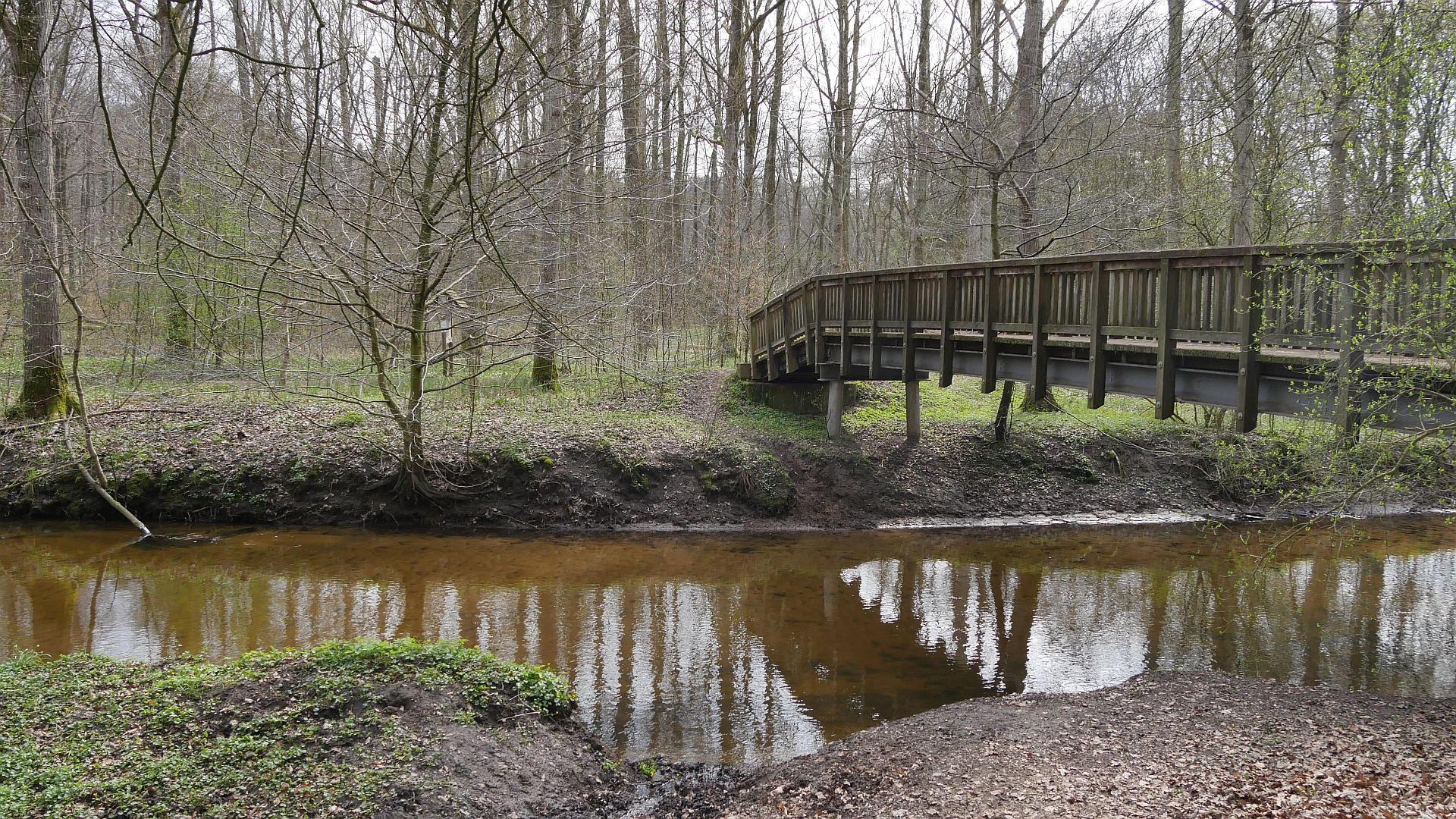
Long Bridge over the Bille near Witzhave in the Billetal

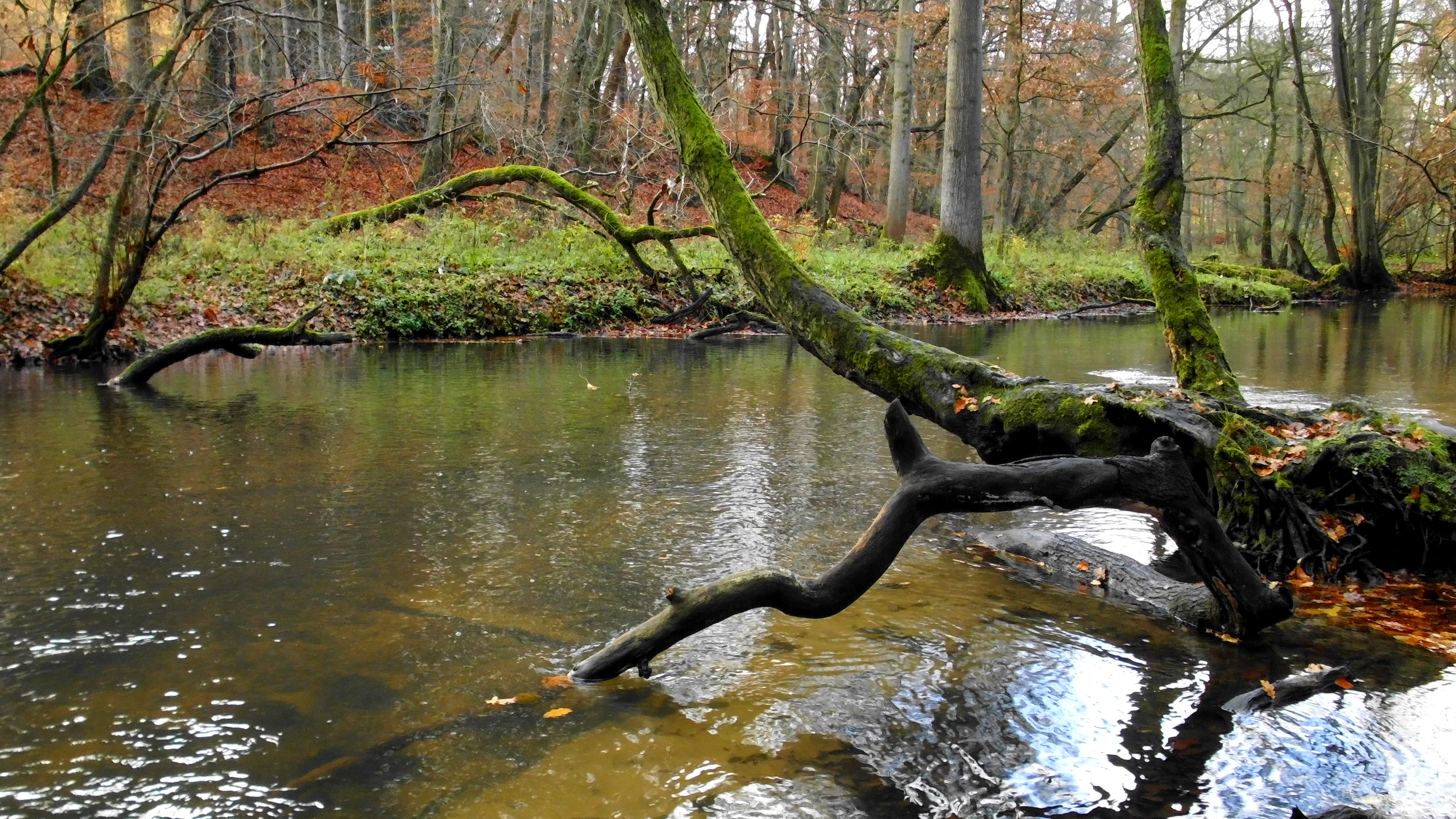
Bille in the Sachsenwald

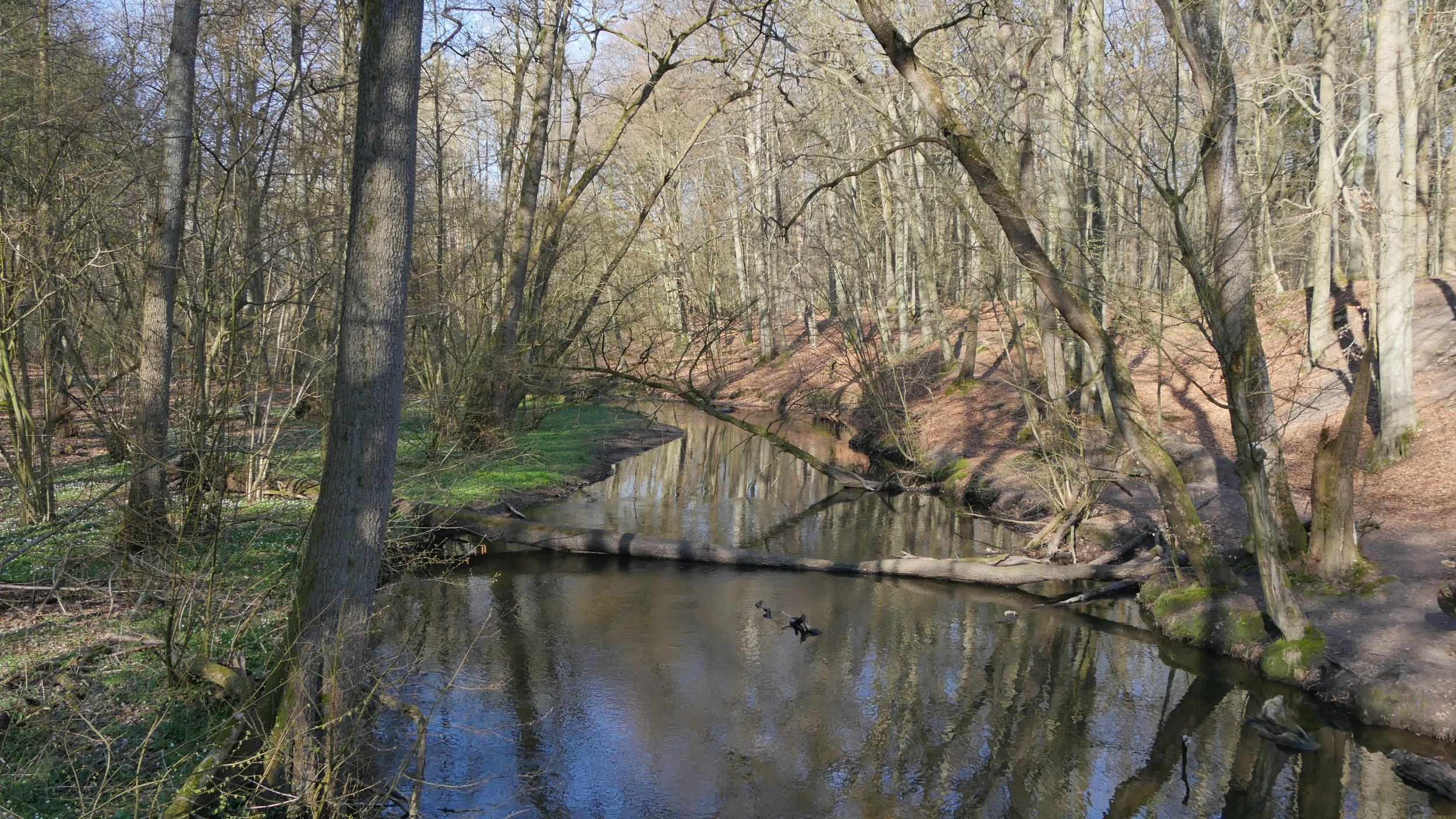
Bille flowing through the Sachsenwald

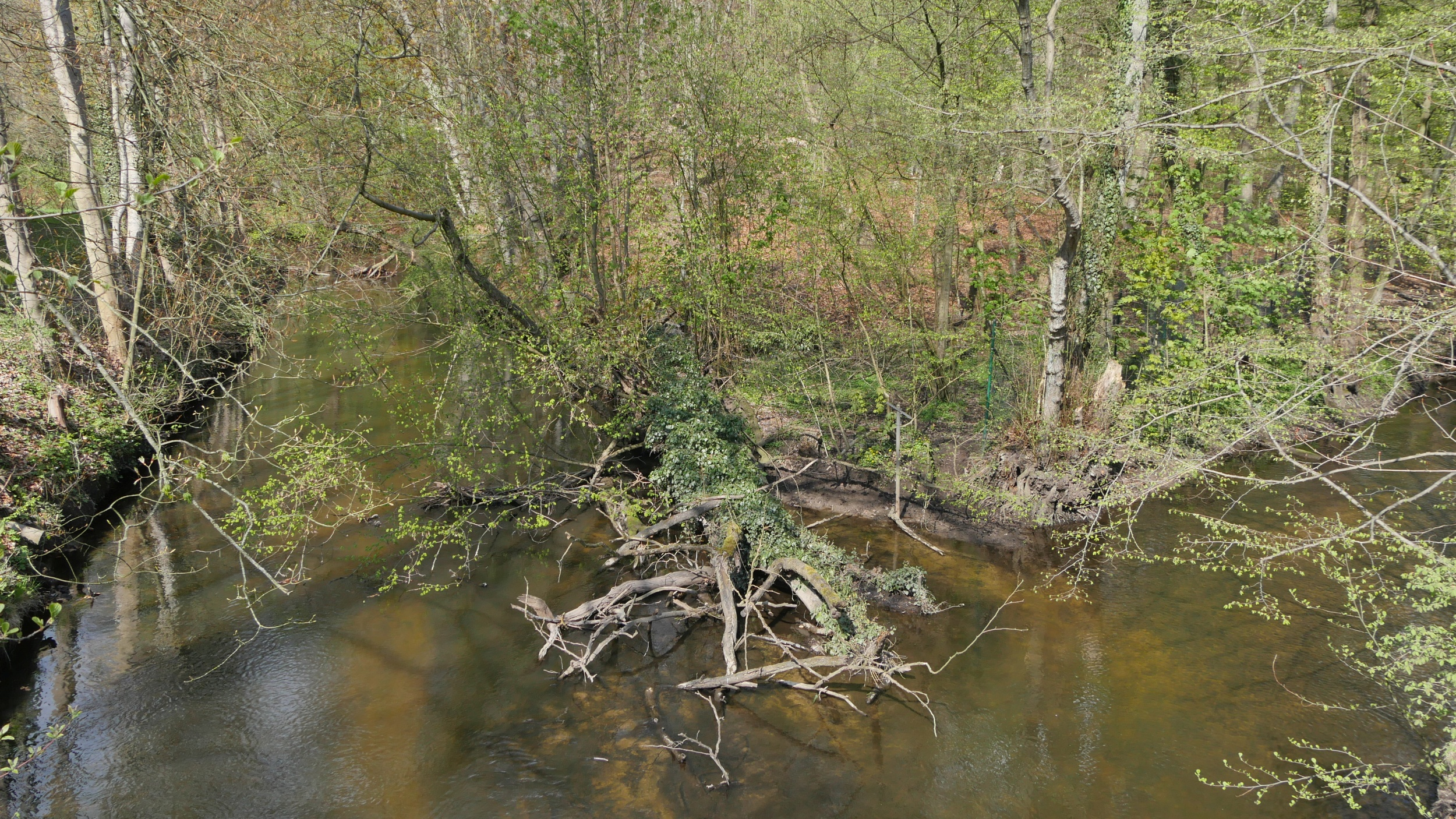
Schwarze Au flowing into the Bille in the Sachsenwald

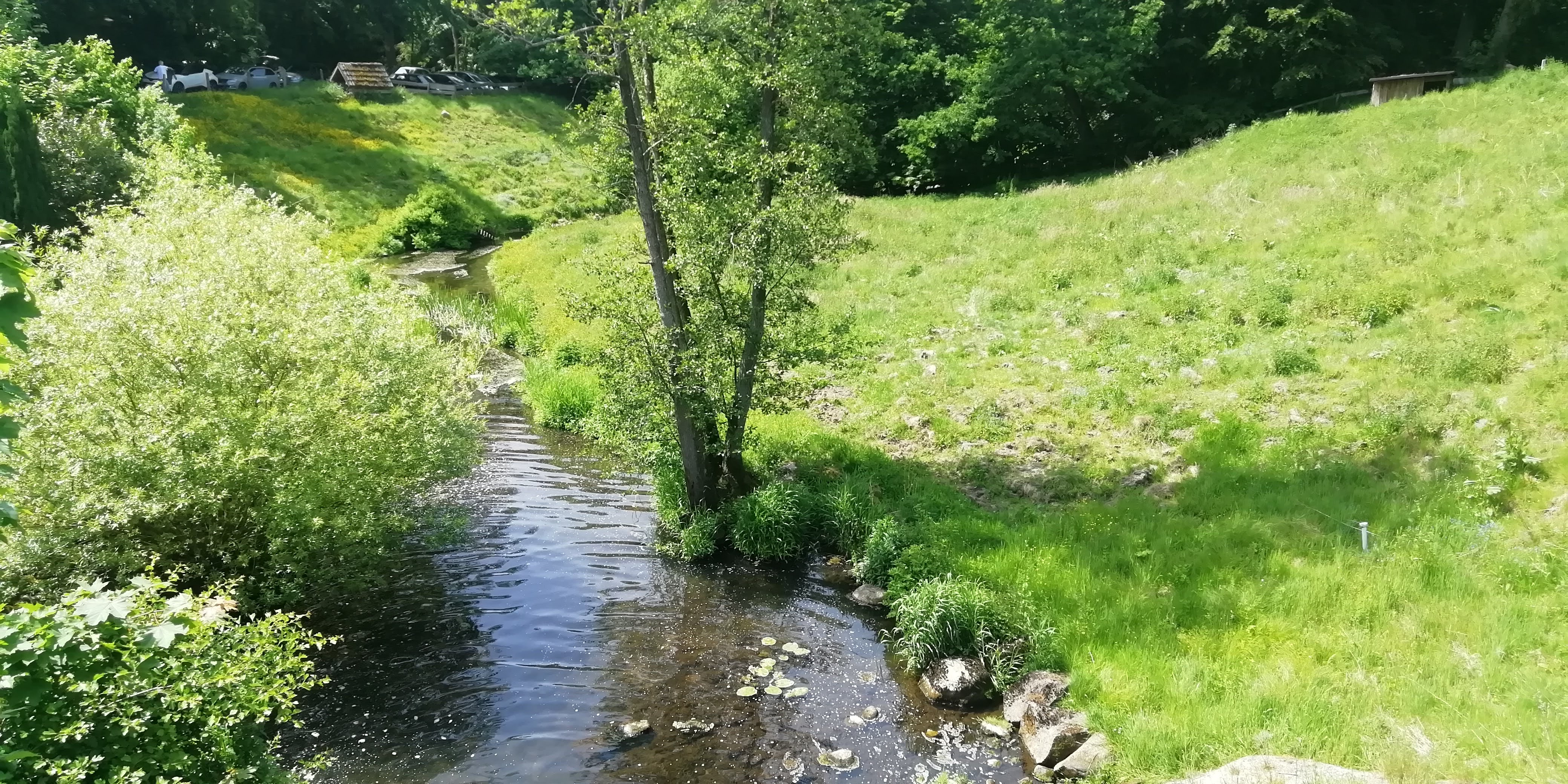
Schwarze Au tributary that flows into the Bille, in Aumühle

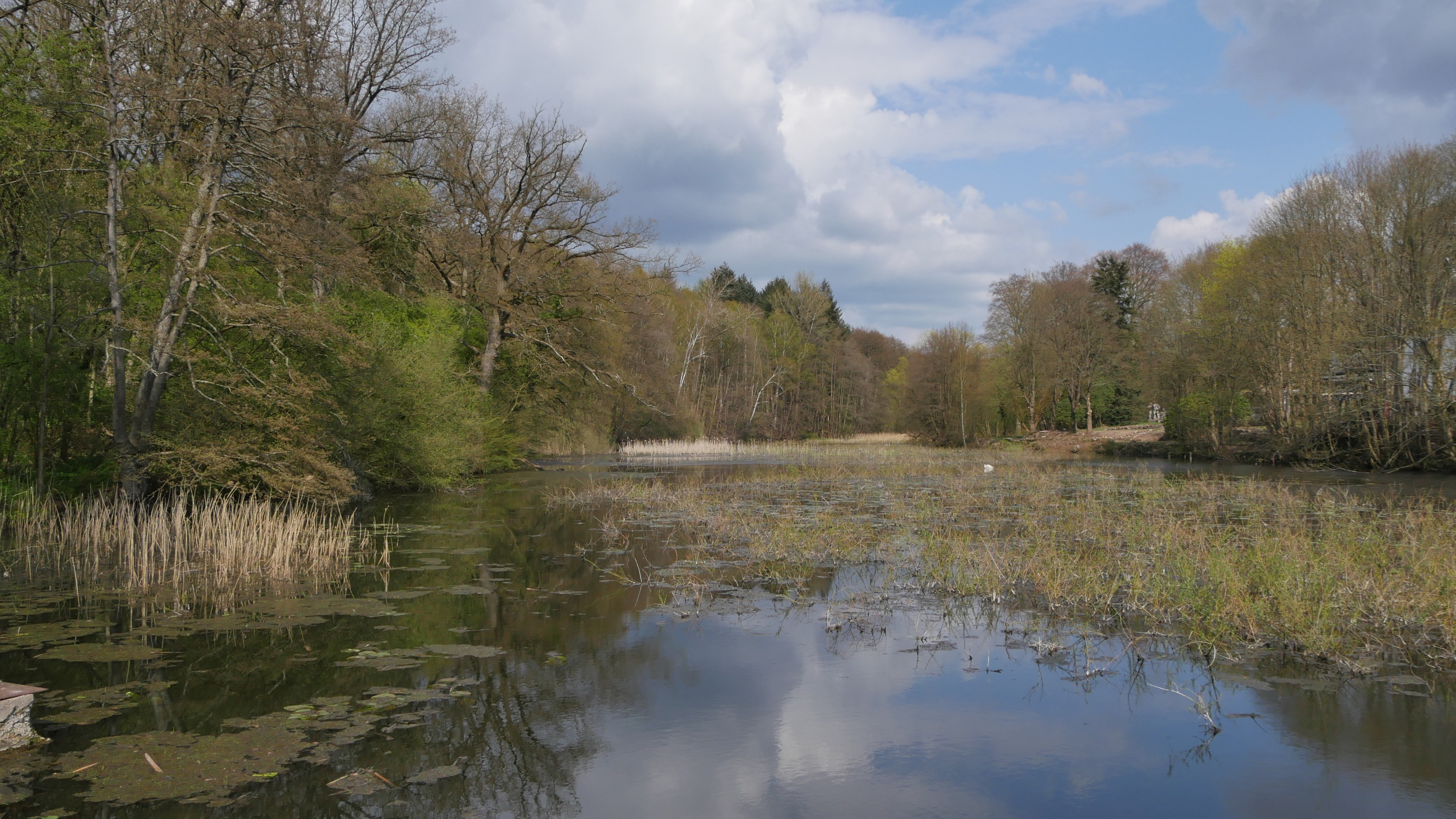
Mühlenteich in Aumühle, which flows into the Bille via the Schwarze Au

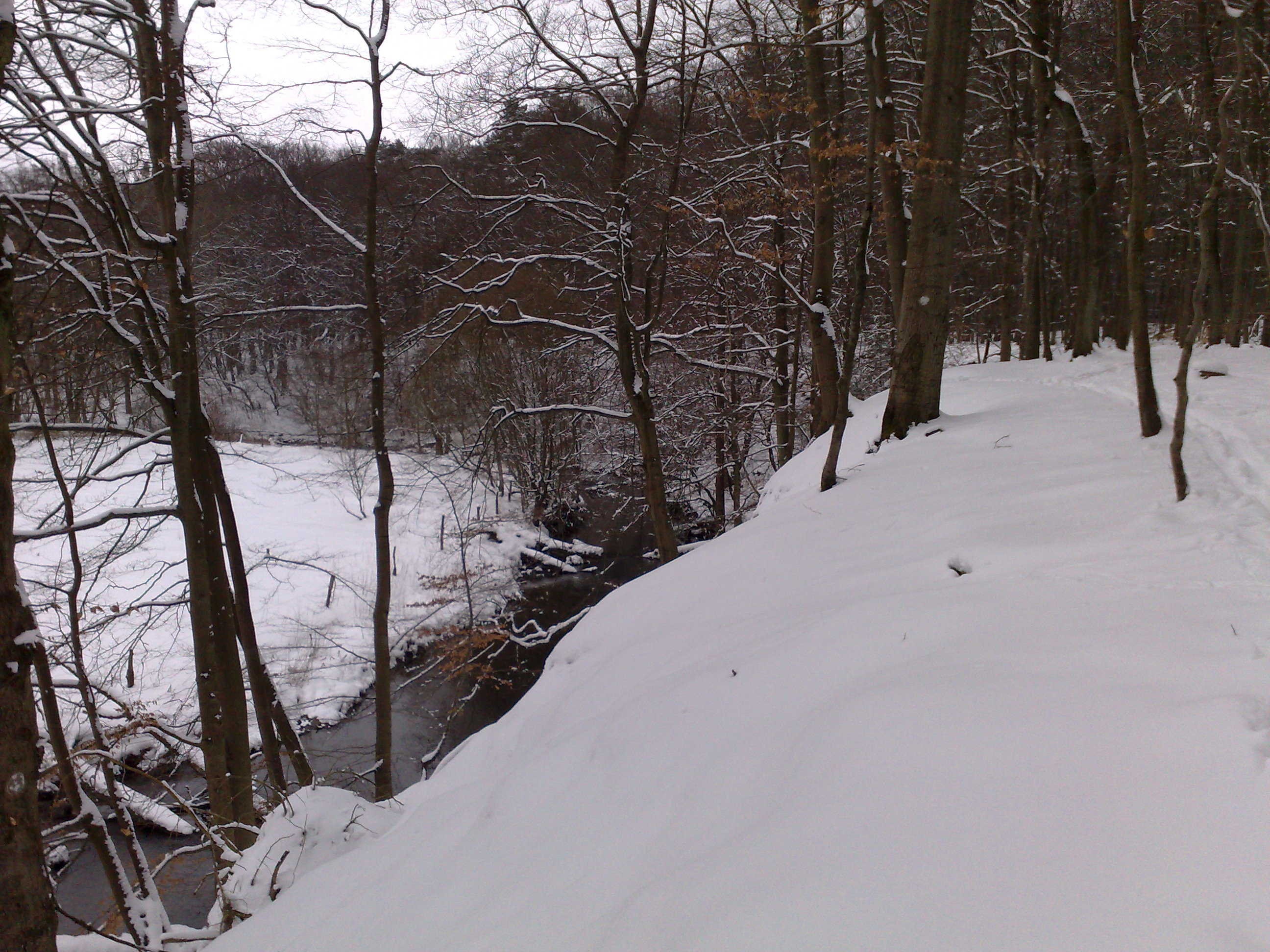
Bille as seen from the Sachsenwald in Winter

== Landmarks ==
- Grander Mühle, an ancient watermill at Kuddewörde, dating back to 1303
- Schloss Reinbek, a castle from 1572
- Schloss Bergedorf, a castle showing wooden raftwork and Brick Gothic

== See also ==
- List of rivers of Schleswig-Holstein
- List of rivers of Hamburg
