= Corbek =

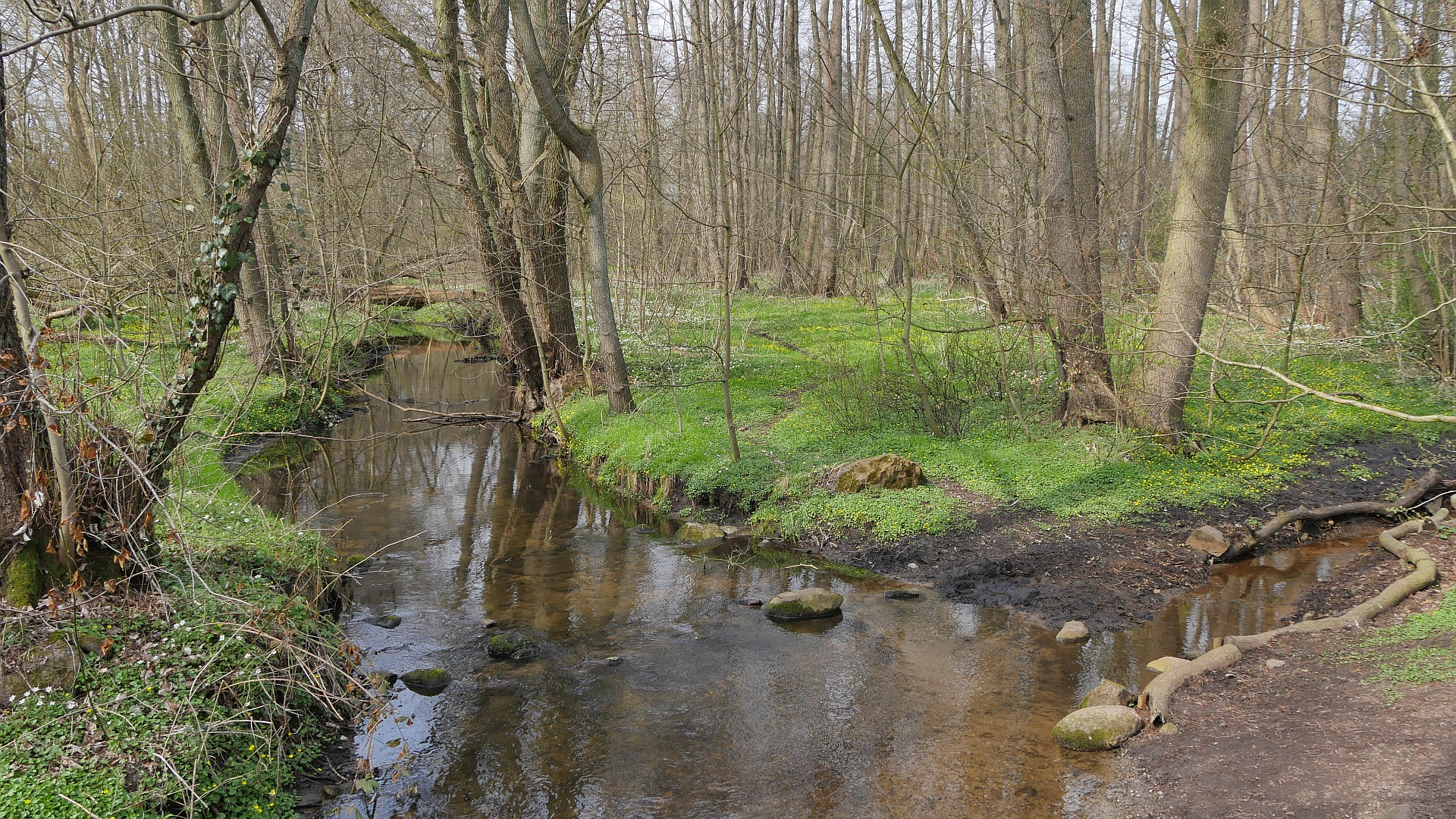

Location
- Country: Germany
- State: Schleswig-Holstein

Physical characteristics
- Mouth
  - location: Bille
  - coordinates: 53°33′51″N 10°20′23″E

Basin features
- Progression: Bille→ Elbe→ North Sea

Corbek (German pronunciation: [ˈkɔʁbeːk]) is a small river of Schleswig-Holstein, Germany. It flows into the Bille near Witzhave.

== Gallery ==
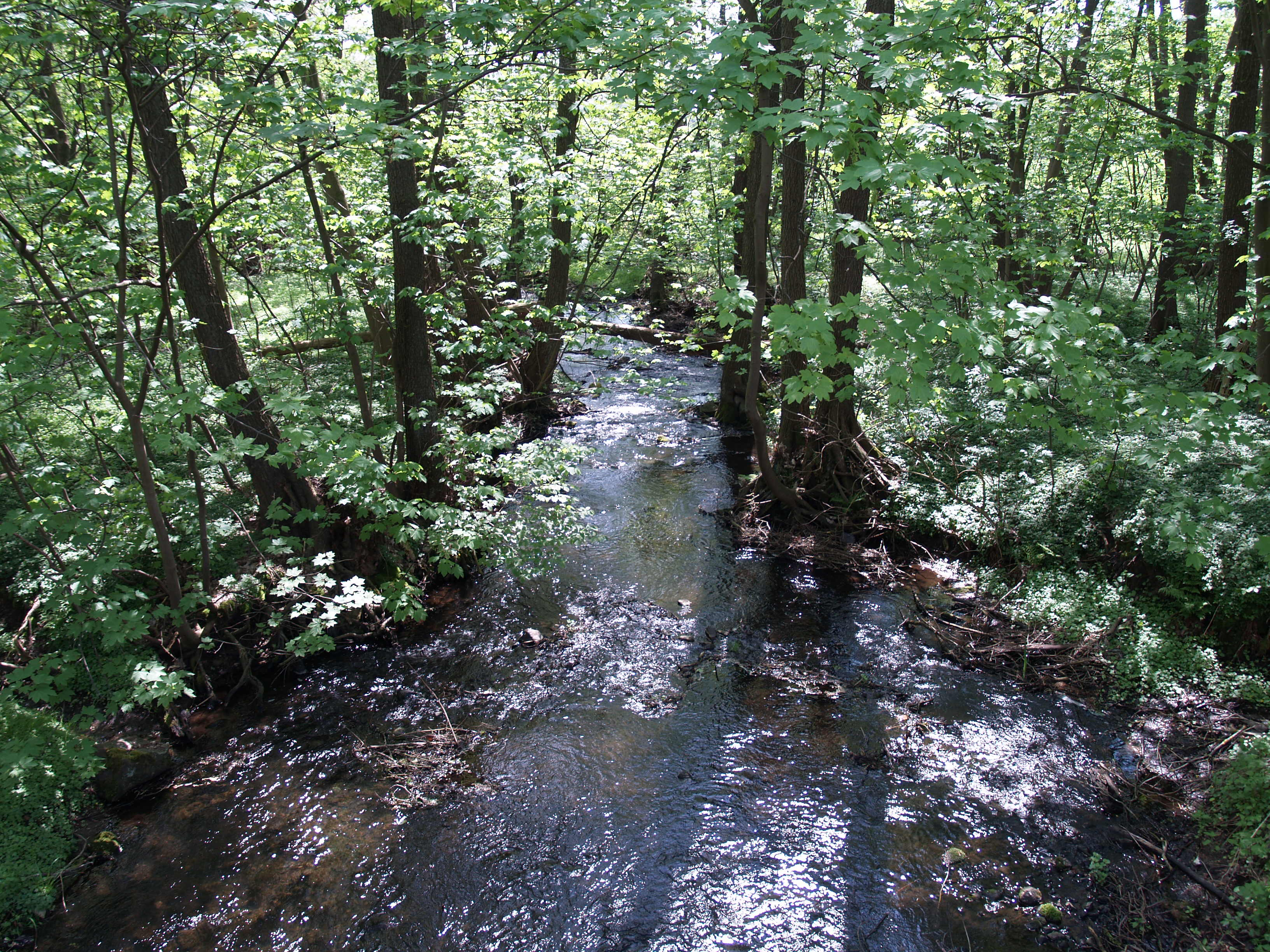
Corbek as seen from the Möllner Landstraße bridge in Witzhave

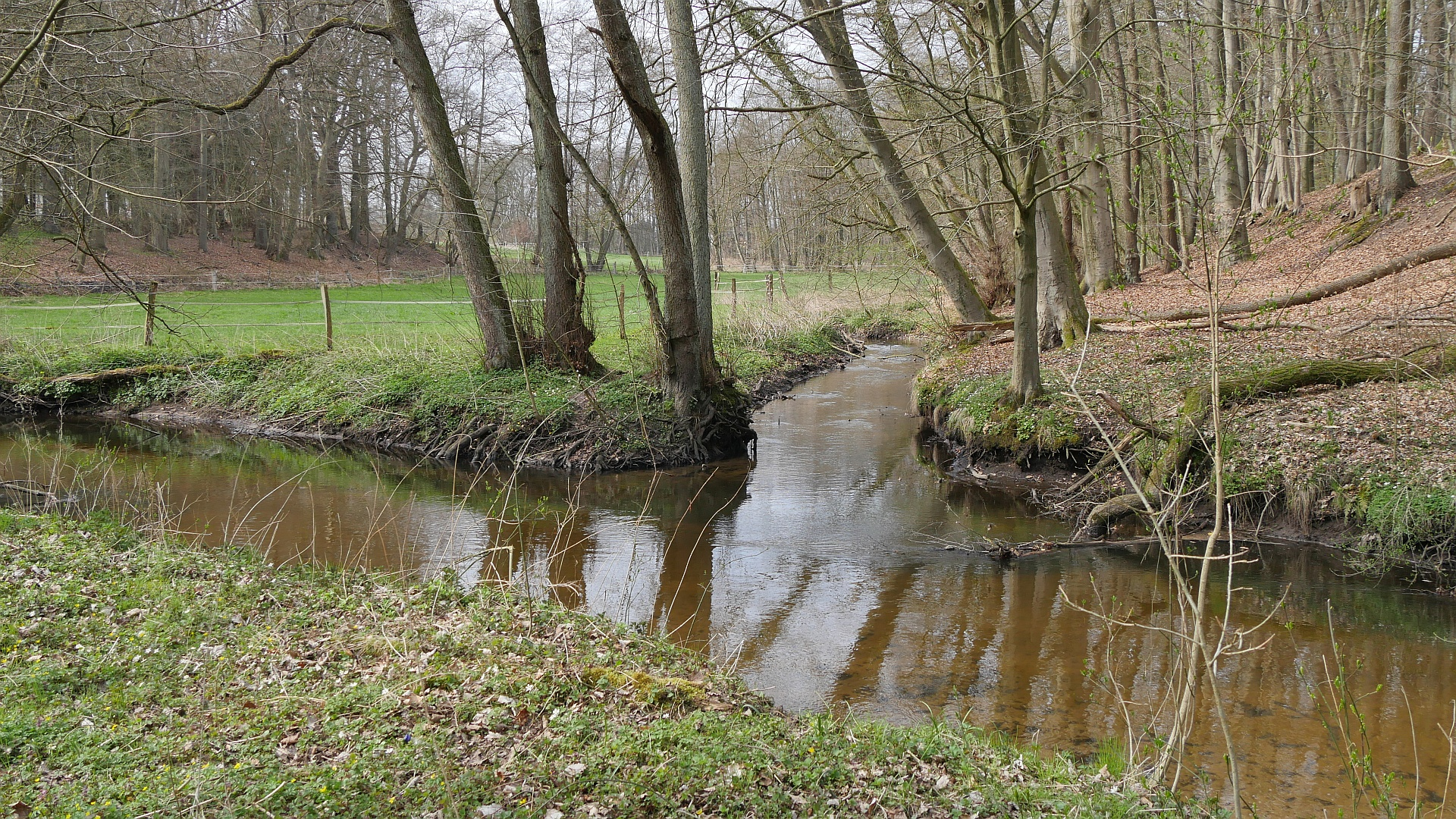
Corbek diverging from the Bille in the Billetal near Witzhave

== See also ==
- List of rivers of Schleswig-Holstein
