= Witzhave =

- Municipality
- Coat of arms

- Location of Witzhave within Stormarn district
- Interactive map of Witzhave
- Location within Germany Location within Schleswig-Holstein
- Coordinates: 53°34′10″N 10°20′15″E
- Country: Germany
- State: Schleswig-Holstein
- District: Stormarn
- Municipal assoc.: Trittau

Government
  - Mayor: Jens Feldhusen

Area
  - Total: 7.87 km^{2} (3.04 sq mi)
- Elevation: 24 m (79 ft)

Population (2025-12-31)
  - Total: 1,517
  - Density: 193/km^{2} (499/sq mi)
- Time zone: UTC+01:00 (CET)
  - Summer (DST): UTC+02:00 (CEST)
- Postal codes: 22969
- Dialling codes: 04104
- Vehicle registration: OD
- Website: www.amt-trittau.de

Witzhave (German pronunciation: [vɪt͡sˈhaːvə], Low German: Witthaav) is a municipality in the district of Stormarn, in Schleswig-Holstein, Germany.

== Geography ==
Witzhave is a part of the Amt Trittau collective municipality within the district of Stormarn and lies roughly 20 km east of Hamburg. The municipality borders the Sachsenwald to the east and has three rivers flowing through its territory - The Corbek, Witzhaver Au, Hahnenbek and the Bille. The Bundesautobahn 24 passes through the municipality. Witzhave is reachable via road or public transport through the 333 bus line of the HVV, connecting the municipality directly to Hamburg.

== History ==
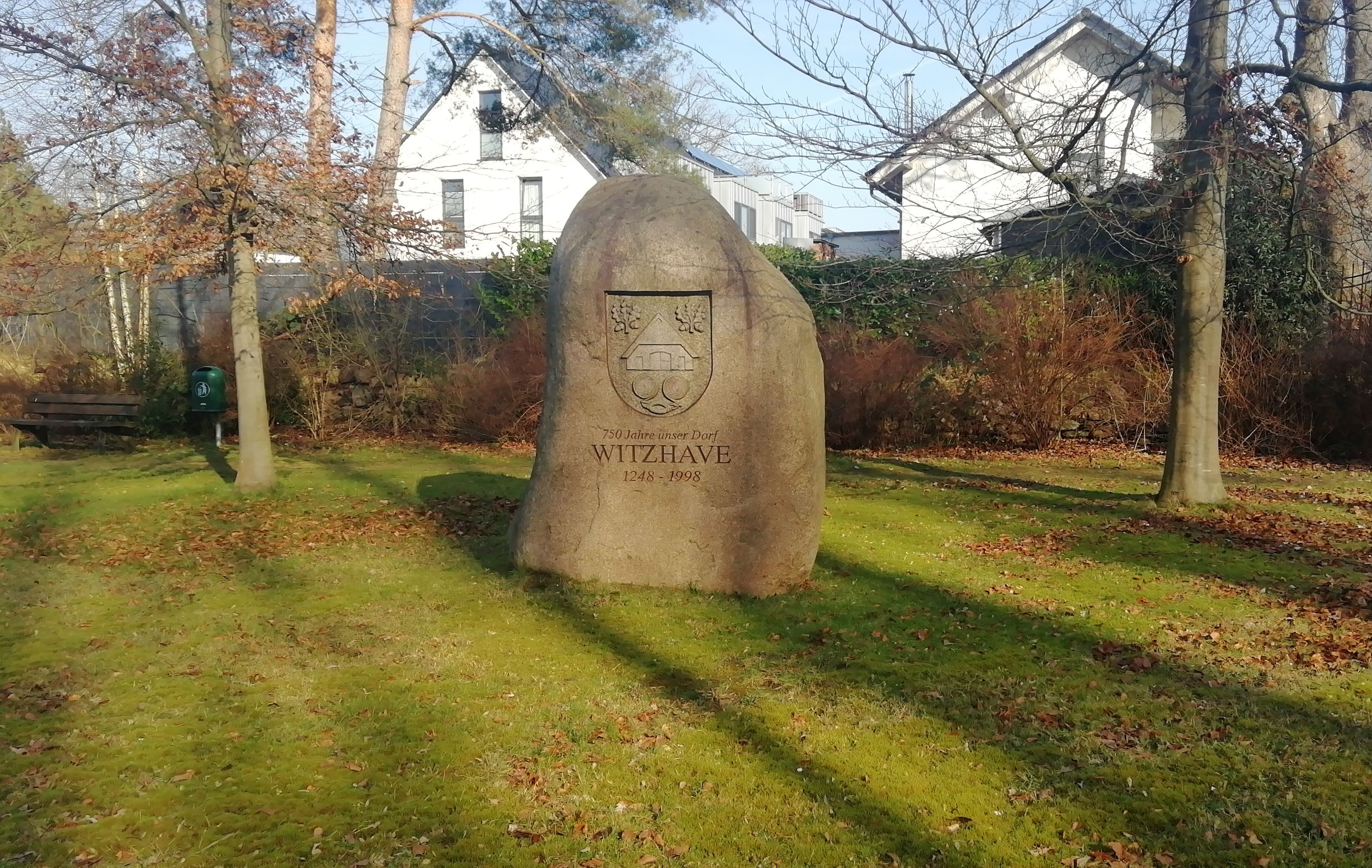
750 year commemorative stone in the center of Witzhave

Evidence of settlement in the area dates back to the early stone age. Bronze Age burial objects were discovered during the construction of a highway through the municipality in 1938. A piece of jewellery found in these discoveries, a robe clasp, is depicted on the municipal coat of arms.

The village was first mentioned in 1248 as "Witeshove", roughly meaning "Farm by the forest". It was sold by the counts of Holstein to the Reinbek monastery in 1300 which constructed a chapel in the village that would be demolished in 1609 due to poor maintenance.

Witzhave was a prominent stop in the trading route between Hamburg and Lübeck with heavy freight wagons pulled by four to six horses frequently passing through the sandy road of the village. This route was however also used to troop transport, which obligated the residents of the village to help out soldiers and their horses in providing shelter as well as supplies. Troop movements through the village were often connected to looting.

The Bundesautobahn 24, running through the municipality, started construction in 1938 but was put on hold until December 1978 due to World War 2 and the division of Germany. Construction resumed in 1980 and the part of the highway crossing Witzhave was inaugurated on the 12 November 1982.

Witzhave came to national attention in late February 1996 when two members of the far-left terrorist group Anti-Imperialist Cell (Antiimperialistische Zelle) were stopped and arrested on the main road leading through the village (Möllner Landstraße). Said road was subsequently closed until afternoon due to the arrested men claiming that their car was filled with explosives. The event was reported in many news outlets throughout Germany, including Tagesschau.

Parts of a Tatort episode were filmed in Witzhave during 2022.

== Demographics ==
As of 2021, Witzhave had a population of 1,567, with 791 (50.5%) thereof being female, and 776 (49.5%) being male. The median age in Witzhave was 44.8 as of 2021.

Historical population
Year	Pop.	±%
1785	151	—
1939	269	+78.1%
1948	743	+176.2%
2015	1,551	+108.7%
2021	1,567	+1.0%
Source: Witzhave municipality

=== Citizenship ===
In the 2011 census, 1,361 people (97.8%) in Witzhave possessed exclusively German citizenship. Additionally, 6 people (0.4%) possessed Dutch and 3 people (0.2%) Austrian citizenship. 21 people (1.5%) possessed another unaccounted citizenship.

=== Religion ===
In the 2011 census, 568 people (40.8%) were members of the Evangelical Church in Germany, with 75 (5.4%) belonging to the Catholic church. 748 people (53.8%) were either irreligious, belonging to another confession, or did not answer.

The only church in the village was inaugurated in 1968, and closed in 2013. The building has since been a chapel, serving primarily as the cultural centre of the village where communal gatherings and events are held. Witzhave has thus not had a church of its own from 1609 to 1968, and again since 2013.

== Politics ==
The current mayor of Witzhave is Jens Feldhausen (WW).

=== Elections ===
The most recent election in Witzhave were the 2023 Schleswig-Holstein municipal elections, where the WW was reelected as the strongest faction.

Candidate	Party	Votes	%	+/-	Seats	+/-
Jens Feldhusen	Wählergemeinschaft Witzhave (WW)	2,402	89.0	▼0.7	12	±0
Peter Linnow	Independent	298	11.0	New	1	▲1
Valid votes		2,700	99.3	▼0.5		
Invalid votes		19	0.7%	±0		
Electorate/voter turnout		690	52.4	▲1.0		
Source: Statistical Office of Hamburg and Schleswig-Holstein
