= Reinbek =

Town in Schleswig-Holstein, Germany

- Town
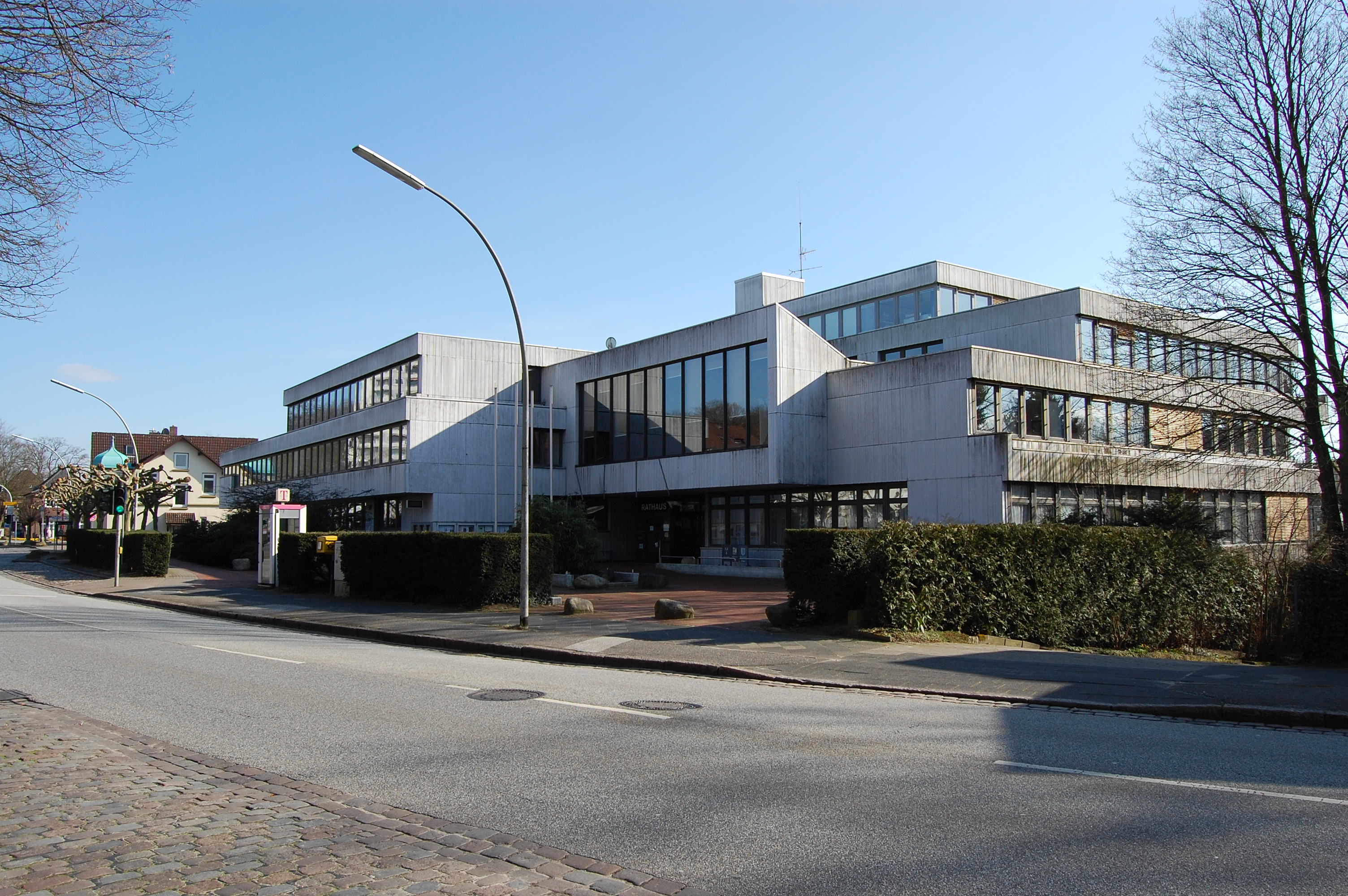
- Town hall

- Coat of arms

- Location of Reinbek within Stormarn district
- Interactive map of Reinbek
- Location within Germany Location within Schleswig-Holstein
- Coordinates: 53°30′32″N 10°14′54″E
- Country: Germany
- State: Schleswig-Holstein
- District: Stormarn
- Subdivisions: 6

Government
  - Mayor: Björn Warmer (SPD)

Area
  - Total: 31.26 km^{2} (12.07 sq mi)
- Elevation: 27 m (89 ft)

Population (2025-12-31)
  - Total: 28,146
  - Density: 900.4/km^{2} (2,332/sq mi)
- Time zone: UTC+01:00 (CET)
  - Summer (DST): UTC+02:00 (CEST)
- Postal codes: 21465
- Dialling codes: 040, 04104
- Vehicle registration: OD
- Website: www.reinbek.de

Reinbek (German: [ˈʁaɪnbeːk]; probably from "Rainbek" = brook at the field margin; Northern Low Saxon: Reinbeek) is a town located in Stormarn district in the northern German state of Schleswig-Holstein within the metropolitan region of Hamburg. It can be accessed by the A1, the A24 autobahn, federal highway 5 and the S-Bahn line S2.

Reinbek was first mentioned in 1226, the city rights were given in 1952. The town is located at the river Bille which was dammed up here to form a mill pond.

== Religion ==
Religious affiliation:

- 44% Protestant
- 9% Catholic
- 22% other religious groups
- 26% without religious affiliation

=== Important church communities ===
- Church of Mary Magdalene (Lutheran)
- Nathan-Söderblom church (Lutheran)
- Ansgar community, St. Ansgar's Chapel and St. Michael's Chapel (Lutheran)
- Sacred Heart of Jesus (Roman Catholic)
- Evangelical Free Church (Baptist)

== Sights ==
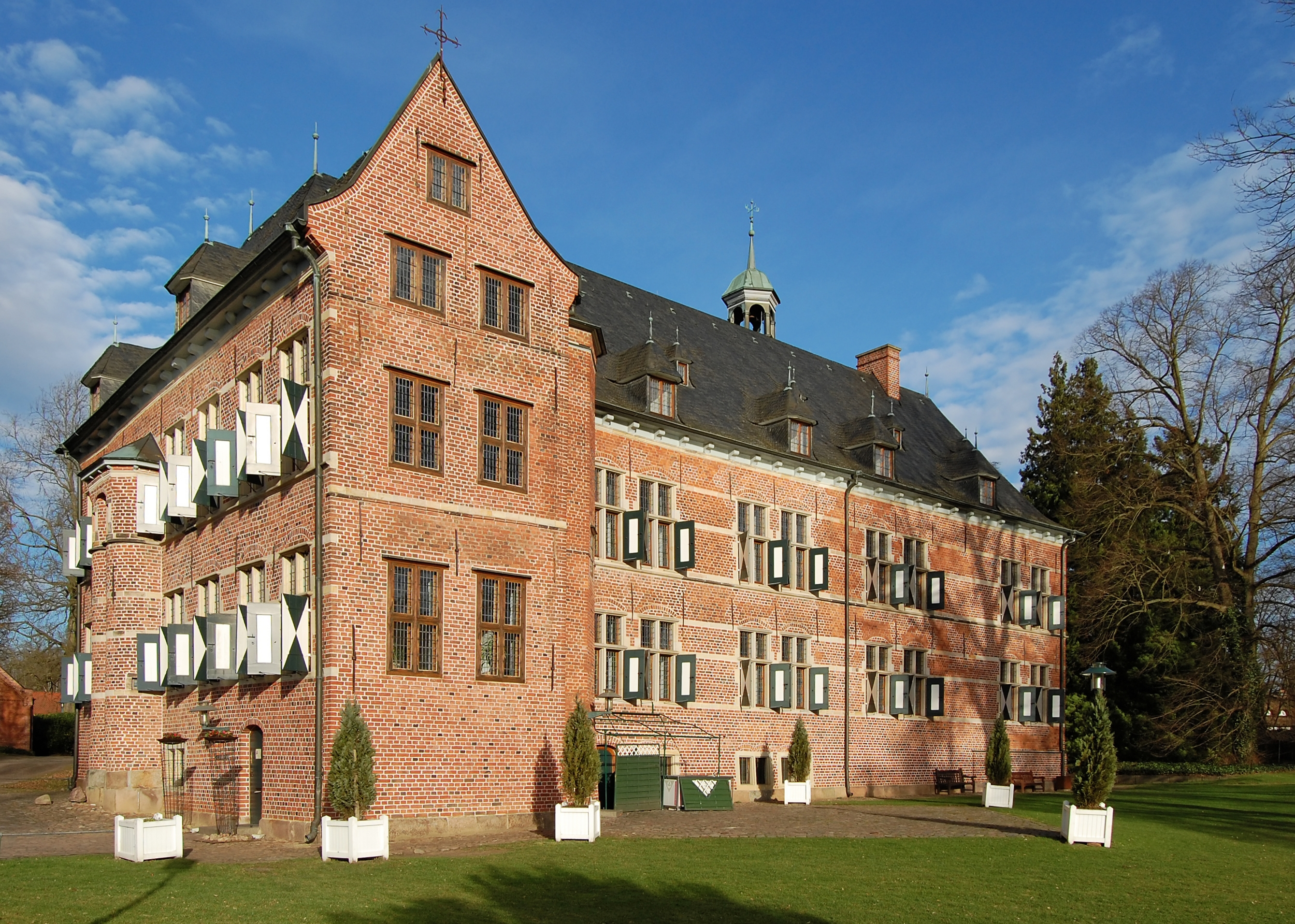
Castle of Reinbek

- 16th-century castle Schloss Reinbeck in Dutch Renaissance style, built for Adolfs I. Schleswig-Holstein-Gottorf. Nowadays art and cultural center for Reinbeck.

== Transport ==
Reinbek station is serviced by the rapid transit system of the Hamburg S-Bahn. Public transport is also provided by buses.

== Twin towns – sister cities ==
Reinbek is twinned with:

- Koło, Poland (1999)

Since 1974, Reinbek also cooperates with Padasjoki in Finland, and has friendly relations with its former twin town of Täby in Sweden.

== Notable people ==
- Minna Specht (1879–1961), teacher and socialist
- Angela Sommer-Bodenburg (born 1948), children's book author and painter
- Sabine Sütterlin-Waack (born 1958), politician
- Jan van Aken (born 1961), politician (The Left)
- Max Kruse (born 1988), association football player
- Maximilian Buhk (born 1992), retired racing driver
- Noma Noha Akugue (born 2003), professional tennis player
