= List of municipal flags of Schleswig-Holstein =

This page lists the municipal flags of Schleswig-Holstein. It is a part of the Lists of German municipal flags, which is split into regions, which in turn, is split into states due to its size.

== Index by state ==
Click the states to browse the municipal flags

== Dithmarschen ==
=== Amt ===
Municipality	Flag	Coat of arms	Enactment Date	Description	Ref.
Burg-Sankt Michaelisdonn			15 April 2009	Banner of arms. The railway bridge (which crosses the Kiel Canal) comes from Burg-Süderhastedt and represents the merger of the former amts. The vine leaves come from Eddelak-Sankt Michaelisdonn and represents the windmills. The leaves represent the two former amts. Blue represents the Bordesholmer See and the Eider river. Designed by Uwe Nagel.	
Büsum-Wesselburen			Coat of arms: 25 May 2008; Flag: 11 March 2026	Banner of arms. The flag and coat of arms depicts Saint Clement who the patron saint of seafarers. He is usually seen carrying an anchor. The four waves represent the municipality's past as an island. Designed by Hans-Frieder Kühne.	
Eider			16 November 2009	Banner of arms. Blue represents the Eider river. Yellow and green represents the moraines and marshes respectively. The three stars represents Hennstedt and the former entities, swords represents Tellingstedt and wheel represents Lunden. Yellow represents farming. Blue represents the Baltic Sea and the Kiel Canal. Designed by Uwe Nagel.	
Heider Umland			1 January 2008	A white flag with ten red and white stripes. The ploughs represents the eleven municipalities. The blue balance represents the former Amt Weddingstedt while the red wheel presents the former Heide-Land. Together, it represents progress, mobility and life. Five spokes of the wheel represents the municipalities of the former latter. The colors are the state colors of Schleswig-Holstein. Designed by Dirk Becker, Hermann Bolle, Heide Karstens, Uwe Nagel and Renate Stephan.	
Marne-Nordsee			9 July 2009	Banner of arms. The seagull is the bird that can be found anywhere in the world especially Marne-Nordsee. The wall represents Marne. The pinnacles represents the three former entities that formed the Amt. Blue represents the North Sea. The gate represents the Amt's commitment to openness and transparency. Green and blue alludes to the relationship between the marshes and the sea. Designed by Uwe Nagel.	
Mitteldithmarschen			27 June 2008	Banner of arms. The design was said to be taken from the former entities that made up the Amt. The horse represents Meldorf-Land. The red stars represents Meldorf. The crosier represents Albersdorf and its patron saint, Saint Remigius. Designed by Uwe Nagel.	

=== Municipalities ===
Municipality	Flag	Coat of arms	Enactment Date	Description	Ref.
Averlak			25 May 1990	A white flag with two blue stripes, a green stripe with a hill and two houses and two blue shovels. The flag alludes to the location of the municipality. The blue represents the North Sea, the Kiel Canal and Kudensee. Shovels and houses represents the importance of soil-based construction. Designed by Uwe Nagel.	
Barkenholm			3 June 2002	Banner of arms. Green represents the moorland, blue represents and yellow represents moraines. The seven bricks represents the seven brickyards. The wavy lines represents Broklandsau. The leaf is a common element of nature.	
Bergewöhrden			TBA	No official flag or coat of arms.	
Brickeln			18 October 1995	A white flag with two wavy blue stripes, two green leaves and a red wheel. Two green branches alludes to the name of the municipality. Two blue waves represents the creeks. The red wheel represents the former windmill. Designed by Uwe Nagel.	
Buchholz			9 February 1989	A green-white-green flag with two leaves symboling the forests and two trees representing wood. Together, they symbolized the red beeches that used to cover the municipality. The design alludes to the origin of the name of the municipality (Buchholz = beech wood). Designed by Uwe Nagel.	
Burg			26 August 1952	A blue-white-blue flag with the a red castle and two blue keys. The red castle represents the Bökelnburg, which gives the municipality its name. The keys represent Saint Peter which the local church is dedicated. Two blue stripes represents the Burger Au and the Kiel Canal. Designed by Wilhelm Horst Lippert.	
Büsum			9 September 1991	No official flag. The coat of arms features a red lighthouse and a blue krabbenkutter (a type of fishing boat). They both represent the North Sea and its dependence to sailors, fishers and tourists.	
Büsumer Deichhausen			TBA	No official flag or coat of arms.	
Dellstedt			15 April 1988	Blue flag with the coat of arms.	
Delve			Coat of arms: 8 May 1979; Flag: 11 September 1984	Green-yellow-green flag with the coat of arms. Green represents the rural areas, yellow represents the Eider Canal and white represents the Eider river. Designed by Hans-Jürgen Böhrnsen.	
Diekhusen-Fahrstedt			TBA	No official flag or coat of arms.	
Dingen			5 December 1990	A green and yellow flag with five green and yellow stripes. Yellow represents the moraines and agriculture. The green represents the marshes and meadows. The wavy lines alludes to the Friedrichshöfer Au. The chestnut and goshawk represents Dinger Donn. Designed by Gerard Peter Parkinson.	
Dörpling			TBA	No official flag or coat of arms.	
Eddelak			25 October 1993	Banner of arms. The coronet represents Eddelak, which in turn represents the Virgin Mary. The windmill represents the economy of Behmhusen. Designed by Uwe Nagel.	
Eggstedt			Coat of arms: 26 September 1985; Flag: 20 April 1988	Banner of arms. The harrow represents agriculture and the groves. Green represents pastures and farmers respectively. The corner, oak branches and the harrow alludes to the name of the municipality. Designed by Uwe Nagel.	
Fedderingen				No official flag or coat of arms.	
Frestedt			12 January 1993	Banner of arms. The harrow represents agriculture and the groves. Green represents pastures and farmers respectively. The corner, oak branches and the harrow alludes to the name of the municipality. Designed by Uwe Nagel.	
Friedrichsgabekoog			TBA	No official flag or coat of arms.	
Friedrichskoog			2011 (de facto)	A blue and white flag with the coat of arms. The coat of arms features depicts a farmhouse separated by a polder (which the municipality is named after) from the North Sea.	
Gaushorn			TBA	No official flag or coat of arms.	
Glüsing			TBA	No official flag or coat of arms.	
Großenrade			Coat of arms: 11 January 1991; Flag: 16 March 1992	Banner of arms. The axes and the cut down tree alludes to the name of the municipality. Green represents the woods that were cut down and nature. Designed by Uwe Nagel.	
Groven			Coat of arms: 12 November 1987; Flag: 12 November 1987 (de facto)	A horizontal blue-white-red flag (representing Schweig-Holstein) with the coat of arms. The coat of arms alludes to the municipality's name. The white waves represents storms. The horse and the fish represents herding and fishing respectively. Designed by Günter Brietzke.	
Hedwigenkoog			13 July 1938	No official flag. The coat of arms is based on a local legend that during warfare, a stork (representing Hedwigenkoog) and a snake (representing Ahlen) turned into a swan and a snake respectively. Fancinated by the legend, Frederick IV named this kroog (municipality) after his wife, Hedwig Sophie upon completion of the kroog's construction. He gave this coat of arms to his wife. Designed by Gustav Adolf Cloß.	
Hellschen-Heringsand-Unterschaar			TBA	No official flag or coat of arms.	
Helse			Coat of arms: 18 September 1995; Flag: 23 April 1996	A green-yellow-green flag with the coat of arms. The coat of arms features the windmill/fire wheel/water whirlpool sculpture by Paul Heinrich Gnekow (which is located in the municipality's sports centre) as a symbolism of dynamism and progress. The ring represents the Goldenen Ring polder built the 11th century and the sapphire on the ring symbolizes the North Sea. Designed by Hans Frieder Kühne.	
Hemme			Coat of arms: 26 January 1988; Flag: 27 September 1996	A blue flag with nine blue and yellow stripes. The flag represents the local parish church. The crown is represents Mary being the Queen of Heaven. Roses and lilies are usually ossicated with the Virgin Mary for puritym love and justness. Designed by Günter Brietzke.	
Hemmingstedt			25 October 1988	Banner of arms with eleven red and white stripes. This flag commemorates the battle of Hemmingstedt. The halberd represents the people of Dithmarschen while the lance represents Denmark. The flame represents oil. Designed by Hans Frieder Kühne.	
Hennstedt			14 February 2005	Banner of arms. Green represents marshes and yellow represents moraines. The white represents the Eider river. The embowed chief represents the hill that the municipality was built on. The wheel represents mobility and crafting. The spokes represents the places of the municipality. Willows are the trees usually seen in the municipality and its leaves represents clubs in the municipality. Green and yellow were the colours of the former Amt Hennstedt. Designed by Uwe Nagel.	
Hillgroven			TBA	No official flag or coat of arms.	
Hochdonn			Coat of arms: 6 December 1991; Flag: 21 July 1992	Banner of arms. Green represents agriculture. Green represents the woods that were cut down and nature. The railway bridge represents the Kiel Canal. The oak represents the Donn spit. Designed by Uwe Nagel.	
Hollingstedt			TBA	No official flag or coat of arms.	
Hövede			TBA	No official flag or coat of arms.	
Kaiser-Wilhelm-Koog			26 June 1983	A white-blue flag with the coat of arms. Blue represents sea and white represents land. The coat of arms contains three seagulls represents the North Sea and the Elbe river. The ears of wheat symbolizes fertile land. The letter "W" represents William I. The cornflower, which forms the letter "W", is said to be the kaiser's favourite flower. Designed by Oskar Schwindrazheim.	
Karolinenkoog			Coat of arms: 22 June 1984; Flag: 22 June 1984 (de facto)	Banner of arms. The crown represents Princess Wilhelmina Caroline of Denmark, who the municipality is named after. The ears of grain represents soil. Designed by Günter Brietzke.	
Kleve			20 September 2004	Banner of arms. The division of the flag is represents the location of the municipality in the Dithmarscher Geest. The horse represents breeding and equestrianism.. The two blue waves symbolizes the Eider river and the Brocklandsau. Blue, white and red are the colours of Schleswig-Holstein. Designed by Uwe Nagel and Nanett Schnittkowski.	
Kuden			12 January 1995	Banner of arms. Yellow represents moraines. Blue represents marshes. The oak represents the Donn spit. The white fort represents the Kuden Fort. A green ear of grain represents agriculture. The green stick represents the municipality's first citizen. Designed by Uwe Nagel.	
Norddeich			Coat of arms: 27 February 2003; Flag: 2 December 2014	Banner of arms. The yellow rafter symbolizes the Goldener Ring dikes that allows farmers to harvest grain. The two white stars stands for the municipality's location and the Vogdemannen and the Beensman families (two of the municipality's well-known residents). The halberd is said to belonged to Ralves Karsten, who is a bailiff turned knight. He fought Hamburg from 1430 to 1434 while having his blood shed which represented by red. As a result of his courage through battle, he influenced the municipality and the surrounding areas.	
Oesterdeichstrich			TBA	No official flag or coat of arms.	
Oesterwurth			TBA	No official flag or coat of arms.	
Quickborn			18 August 1993	A green flag with nine green and white stripes. Yellow basin was said to be built around a well. Oak leaves represents the municipality's past as a forest. Designed by Uwe Nagel.	
Reinsbüttel			30 October 2001	Banner of arms. The blue and white wavy pattern represents the Wahrstrom strait (Büsum used to be an island until a dam was constructed in 1585–1609). The house displayed on the flag usually found on polders and represents the municipality's first inhabitants. The cart represents the hard work of farmers. Green represents marshes. Yellow represents the harvest season. Designed by Wilhelm Horst Otto Peiser.	
Sankt Michaelisdonn			6 December 1991	A blue flag with nine blue and yellow stripes. The farmer killing the dragon with a scythe represents the legend of Saint Michael. The vane represents the local windmill. Designed by Wilhelm Horst Lippert.	
Schülp			17 May 2013	Banner of arms. Designed by Renate Kainzberger.	
Strübbel			TBA	No official flag or coat of arms.	
Süderdeich			6 December 2004	No official flag. The rafter symbolizes the 24 thatched roof houses in the municipality and their important roles, the wheel represents agriculture and the branch stands for nature. Designed by H. Schönknecht.	
Süderhastedt			17 February 1993	A green flag with nine white and green stripes. The swords alludes to the name of the municipality. Two ears of grains represent agriculture. Three roses represents the local church. Designed by Uwe Nagel.	
Warwerort			8 December 2014	No official flag. Blue and eight white waves represent the North Sea and the former Warwerort port. The farmhouse and the three corn ears represent agriculture. Designed by Reimer Sievers.	
Wesselburen			Coat of arms: 22 February 1901; Flag: 15 July 2015	Banner of arms. The bar and pallets represents the drainage trenches. The farmhouse represents those built on marshes. The municipality was developed during the Middle Ages through agriculture and the grain trade. In 1901, the king of Prussia granted the coat of arms to the municipality. Designed by Reinhold Boie.	
Wesselburener Deichhausen			TBA	No official flag or coat of arms.	
Wesselburenerkoog			TBA	No official flag or coat of arms.	

Krempel	24 February 1993 –	A green-yellow flag with the coat of arms. The black eagle represents the Wurtmannen family which ruled over the municipality. It also represents the power of the Holy Roman Empire until 1559. The gnarled pine stands for overcoming disasters. The pine tree represents regrowth. Green symbolizes agriculture and yellow for sand dunes and nature. Designed by Günter Brietzke.
Kronprinzenkoog	29 August 1995 –	A green and yellow flag with two black waves in the yellow stripes. The coat of arms comes from the picture window of the meeting rooms in the municipal hall in Meldorf. It depicts a sower, who is actually Frederick VI, Count of Zollern (which the polder is named after). Green stands for land, black for the marshes and yellow for the crops. Designed by Hans Frieder Kühne and Oskar Schwindrazheim.
Lehe	8 February 1988 –	A red-white flag with the coat of arms. The eagle and the lily is said to be symbols of the Wurtmannen family. The blue represents the Eider river which the municipality is located. The coat of arms was made to honor Peter and Markus Swyn. Designed by Wilhelm Horst Lippert.
Lieth	22 March 2002 –	Banner of arms. White represents the sky and green represents the soil. An oil well and a plough symbolizes industry.
Linden	14 December 1987 –	A blue-white flag with the coat of arms surrounded by twelve stars. The tree represents water as a source of agriculture. The nasselblatt represents Holstein. The star pays homage to the European Union (which Germany is a member of). Designed by Gerhard Schwabe.
Lohe-Rickelshof	15 December 2010 –	Banner of arms. The white triangle and the oak leaf represents Lohe and its beautiful scenery filled with forests and the red triangle and a gear represents Rickelshof with its powerful steel industry. Designed by Hans Heinz Domke.
Lunden	25 January 1991 –	Blue flag with the coat of arms. The black eagle represents the Holy Roman Empire. The red iron grid represents Saint Lawrence. Designed by Günter Brietzke.
Neuenkirchen	15 December 2010 –	Green-yellow flag with the coat of arms. The red church symbolizes the local parish while the white cottongrass represents the Weißes Moor. Designed by Uwe Nagel.
Norderheistedt	TBA	No official flag or coat of arms.
Norderwöhrden	TBA	No official flag or coat of arms.
Nordhastedt	19 January 1990 –	A white flag with seven red and white stripes. The peasant with the halberd represents the legends of female defenders of the municipality from criminals (which is an inspiration for Dorffest Frunsbeer). Designed by Georg Fink and Hans Frieder Kühne.
Ostrohe	9 July 1989 –	A red-white-red flag. The red stripes symbolizes the present, the oak leaf represents the beautiful forests of Behnkeforst, the cattail represents the Ostroher Moor and the ear of corn represents traditional industry through agriculture. Designed by Dirk Becker.
Pahlen	TBA	No official flag or coat of arms.
Rehm-Flehde-Bargen	23 March 1990 –	A green-yellow-green flag with the coat of arms. The total number oak leaves represents Rehm, Flehde and Bargen. The oak leaves represents Rehm and the fact that the municipality used to be a forest area, the white wave represents Flehde and the hills represent Bargen. Designed by Günter Brietzke.
Sankt Annen	23 September 2010 –	A blue-white horizontal flag with the coat of arms. A blue flag with nine blue and yellow stripes. It depicts Saint Anne (representing the local church) and three fishes crucians (representing either Neufeld, Damm and Österfeld, which are the former municipalities that made up Sankt Annen, the three streams from the Eider river or Heymen Claus, Russen Marquart and Junge Claus Johann of the Russebolingmannen family). Blue symbolizes the Eider river and the location of the three former of islands of Neufeld, Damm and Österfeld. Designed by Günter Brietzke.
Schalkholz	TBA	No official flag or coat of arms.
Schlichting	TBA	No official flag or coat of arms.
Stelle-Wittenwurth	30 January 1998 –	The farmhouse on the hill represents a typical house that was built on the Wittenwurth hill. The oak leaves represents the oak forests that used to be located in the marshes of the municipality. White represents the North Sea and the green represents land. Designed by Uwe Nagel.
Süderdorf	6 May 2009 –	Banner of arms. The four quarters represents Lendern, Lüdersbüttel, Schelrade and Wellerhop (the former municipalities that made up Süderdorf). The sun acts like a cardinal point. The horseshoes represents agriculture and the farmers. The foliage leaf represents the trees. Blue stands for the two main watermills. Designed by Uwe Nagel.
Süderheistedt	25 August 1999 –	Banner of arms. The magpie and tree represents the legend of the Dithmarscher Wunderbaum tree that gained the municipality its freedom. As a result of the disappearing tree, the municipality had to plant a seedling in its place. The oak leaves represents the Süderheistedter and Mount Vogelstange. The line represents the Broklandsau. The flag expresses the location of the municipality (green for geest areas and white for moor areas). Designed by Thies Rohwedder.
Tellingstedt	23 November 2009 –	A blue flag with the eight blue and white stripes. The flag depicts Martin of Tours cutting a piece of his cape with a sword. He represents the local church. The silver jug represents the importance of pottery. Designed by Uwe Nagel.
Tielenhemme	TBA	No official flag or coat of arms.
Wallen	TBA	No official flag or coat of arms.
Weddingstedt	23 November 1989 –	A white flag with two red stripes. Blue, white and red are state colours. The blue scales represent the power of the authorities during Middle Ages to the 19th century. Designed by Dirk Becker.
Welmbüttel	TBA	No official flag or coat of arms.
Wesseln	19 June 1989 –	Blue stands for the North Sea, yellow for corn growing on geest and green is a representation of the Rugenberg burial mound that is surrounded by marshes in meadows. The three trees represents the forests that surrounded the municipality.
Westerborstel	TBA	No official flag or coat of arms.
Westerdeichstrich	12 December 2005 –	Banner of arms. The green windmill represents the Margaretha, the spade represents dykes and treforestation and the mermaid represents the tourism industry. Designed by Reinhold Boie.
Wiemerstedt	TBA	No official flag or coat of arms.
Wöhrden	5 September 2005 –	Banner of arms. The green hill represents the wurt and agriculture. The red church is a depiction of the local church. The two blue waves stands for the municipality's former status as a seaport next to the North Sea. The green swords represents blood spilled from its citizens from 1319 to 1500. Designed by Manfred Rüthlein.
Wrohm	TBA	No official flag or coat of arms.

=== Former amts ===
Municipality	Flag	Coat of arms	Enactment Date	Description	Ref.
Burg-Süderhastedt			15 December 1975 1 January 2008	No official flag.	
Büsum			15 April 1991 25 May 2008	No official flag. The coat of arms was reenacted as the coat of arms of Büsum-Wesselburen on 25 May 2008.	
Eddelak-Sankt Michaelisdonn			15 December 1975 1 January 2008	No official flag.	
Heide-Land			Coat of arms: 22 November 2000; Flag: 8 December 2001 1 January 2008	Banner of arms. The wheel represents Catherine of Alexandria (who is the patron saint of Nordhastedt), agriculture, and technology. Its spokes represents the five municipalities of the amt. The fleur-de-lis represents the Virgin Mary who the patron saint of Hemmingstedt. The anchor stands for Designed by Hermann Bolle. The anchor represents Saint Nicholas who is the patron saint of Wöhrden. Red and white are country colours of Dithmarschen and green represents nature (from the moors of the Fieler Moor to the forests of Riesewohld). The green and white rays represents the farming communities of the amt.	
Hennstedt			Coat of arms: 10 April 1987; Flag: 30 January 1998 1 January 2008	Banner of arms. Green and yellow represents the merger of Amt Delve and Hennstedt in 1970. They also represent marshes and moraines. The twelve stars represents the communities in the Amt and the European Union. Designed by Gerhard Schwabe.	
Tellingstedt			13 July 1989 1 January 2008	A blue flag with nine blue and white stripes. The flag depicts Martin of Tours cutting a piece of his cape with a sword. He represents the local church. Designed by Wilhelm Horst Lippert.	
Weddingstedt			16 November 1999 1 January 2008	No official flag.	
Wesselburen				No official flag or coat of arms.	

=== Former municipalities ===
Municipality	Flag	Coat of arms	Enactment Date	Description	Ref.
Wesselburen			17 July 2010 15 July 2015	White flag with the coat of arms.	

== Flensburg ==
Municipality	Flag	Coat of arms	Enactment Date	Description
Flensburg			Coat of arms: 1 May 1901; Flag: 30 June 1938	A blue flag with the coat of arms. The two blue lions represents the Duchy of Schleswig, the silver nettle leaf in the red shield represents the Duchy of Holstein. The red tower represents the defense of the city. The waves represents the city's connection to the North Sea. Designed by Johannes Holtz, Max Kirmis, Erwin Nöbbe and Heinrich Sauermann.
Flensburg			Coat of arms: 1 May 1901; Flag: 30 June 1938	Vertical variant.

=== Communities ===
Community	Flag	Coat of arms	Enactment Date	Description
Mürwik				A blue and yellow flag with the coat of arms.

== Herzogtum Lauenburg ==
=== Amt ===
Flag	Amt	Date	Description
	Berkenthin	TBA	No official flag.
	Breitenfelde	TBA	No official flag.
	Büchen	TBA	No official flag.
	Hohe Elbgeest	25 June 2002 –	Red flag with the coat of arms. The eight blue pales (rays of sun) represents the municipalities. The red sun represents Herzogtum Lauenburg. The colors are the state colors of Schleswig-Holstein. Designed by Ulrich Zündel.
	Lauenburgische Seen	TBA	No official flag.
	Lütau	9 July 2008 –	Banner of arms. Designed by Walter Lehmann.
	Sandesneben-Nusse	1 January 2008 –	Banner of arms. The blue wave pattern represents the creeks while the shelves represents the rural environment. The green lozenges represents the twenty-five municipalities. The red horseheads represents the two former Amts. Designed by Wolfgang Bentin.
	Schwarzenbek-Land	6 December 1991 –	Banner of arms. The horse represents Herzogtum Lauenburg. The lily comes from the Schack noble family. The balls represents nineteen municipalities. Designed by Walter Lehmann.

=== Municipalities ===
Flag	Municipality	Date	Description
	Düchelsdorf	TBA	No official flag.
	Hornbek	TBA	No official flag.
	Rondeshagen	TBA	No official flag.

Alt Mölln

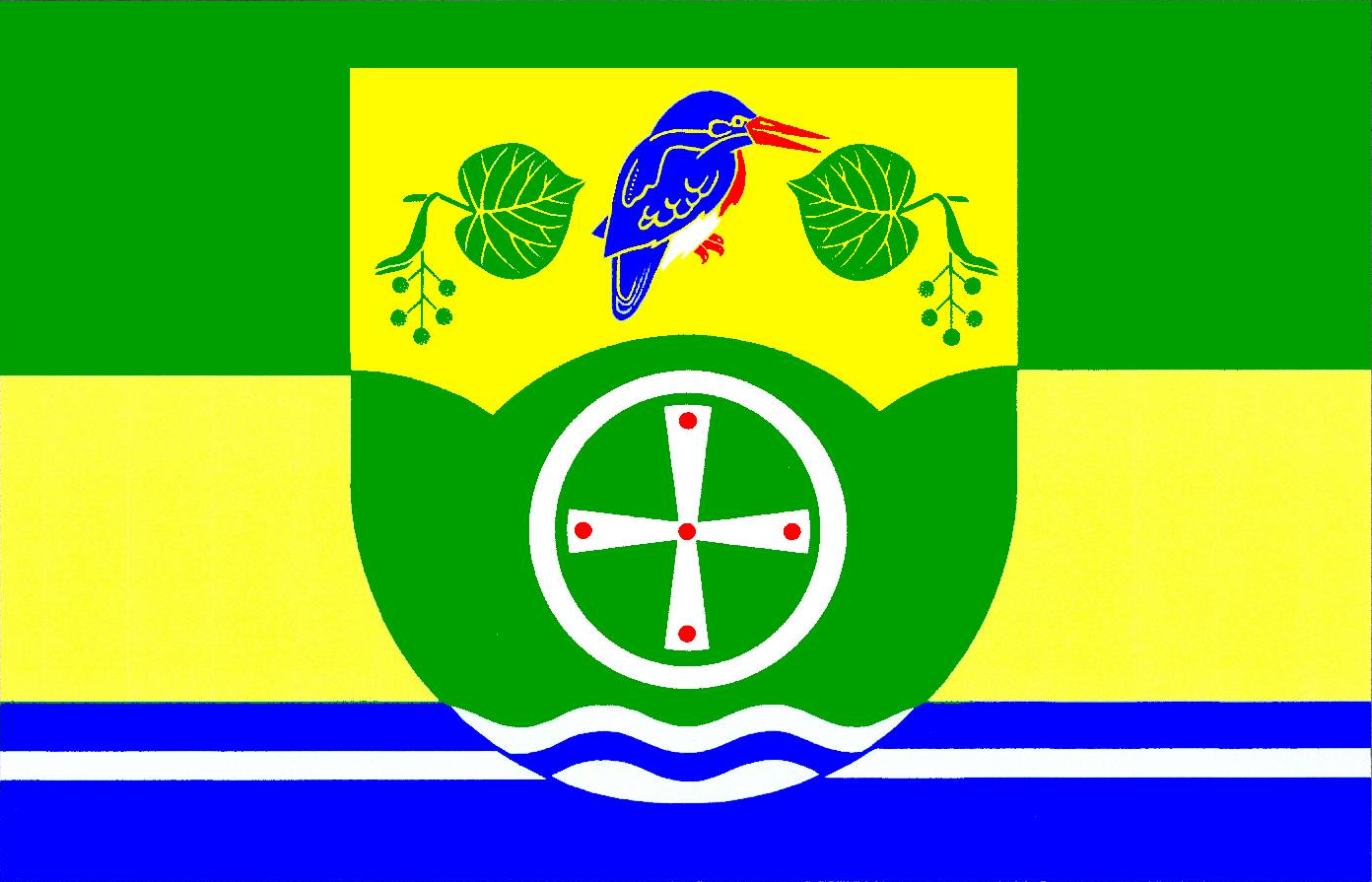
Bälau

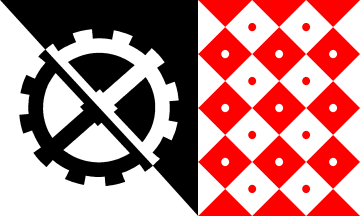
Behlendorf

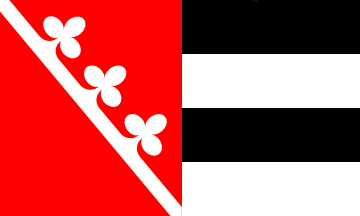
Berkenthin

Besenthal

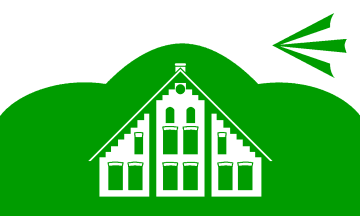
Bliestorf

Borstorf

Breitenfelde

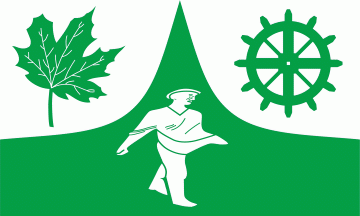
Göldenitz

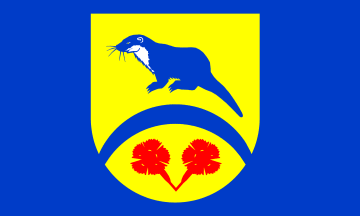
Grambek

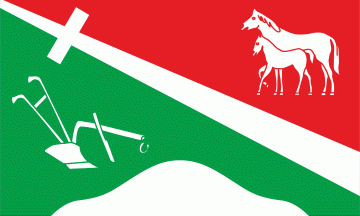
Kastorf

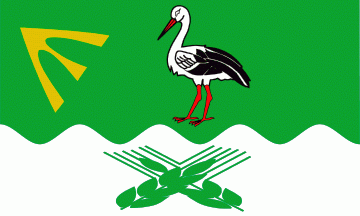
Klempau

Krummesse

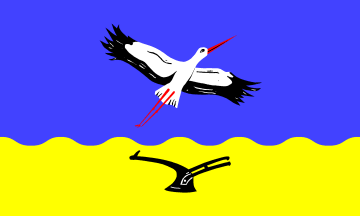
Lehmrade

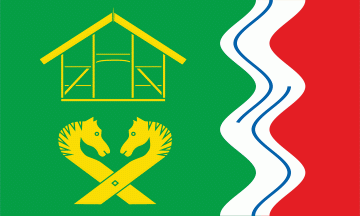
Niendorf bei Berkenthin

Niendorf an der Stecknitz

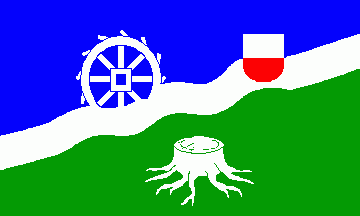
Sierksrade

Schretstaken

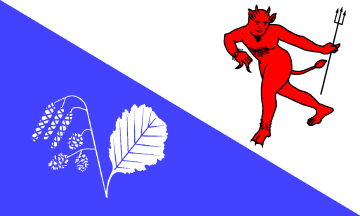
Talkau

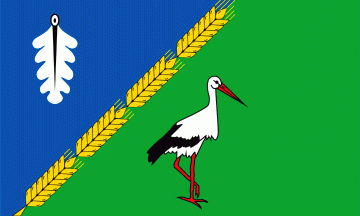
Woltersdorf

== Kiel ==
Municipality	Flag	Coat of arms	Enactment Date	Description	Ref.
Kiel			Coat of arms: 14 May 1901; Flag: 1921	Banner of arms. A red flag based on the County of Schaumburg with a black boat representing the city's importance as a port.	
Kiel			Coat of arms: 14 May 1901; Flag: 1921	Vertical variant.	

== Lübeck ==
Municipality	Flag	Coat of arms	Enactment Date	Description	Ref.
Lübeck			Coat of arms: 1450; Flag: 22 January 1941	White-red bicolor with a black eagle the Lübeck double eagle.	
Lübeck			Coat of arms: 1450; Flag: 22 January 1941	Vertical variant.	

== Nordfriesland ==
=== Amt ===
Flag	Amt	Enactment Date	Description	Ref.
	Eiderstedt	10 September 2012 –	The colours are said to have come from the coat of arms. Designed by Uwe Nagel.	
	Föhr-Amrum	TBA	No official flag.	
	Landschaft Sylt	TBA	No official flag.	
	Mittleres Nordfriesland	TBA	No official flag.	
	Nordsee-Treene	TBA	No official flag.	
	Pellworm	TBA	No official flag.	
	Südtondern	1 January 2008 –	Banner of arms. The lighthouse represents Südtondern while its rays of light represents the six municipalities. The flag contains the color of the flag of North Frisia. Blue represents the Wadden Sea, yellow representing the moraines, dunes and fields of rapeseeds, green represents marshes, agriculture and woods and white represents water. The cauldron is said to represent the fraternalism and attention of the Frisii. Designed by Burmeister.	
	Viöl	14 April 2011 –	Banner of arms. White with thirteen red planks (representing the municipalities) forming a bridge over the blue Arlau river and two crosses (representing Viöl and Schwesing) surrounded by a white border. Designed by Kurt Hans Ernst August Peter.	

== Ostholstein ==
=== Amt ===
Municipality/Amt	Flag	Coat of arms	Enactment Date	Description
Großer Plöner See			23 October 2024	
Lensahn			7 September 2001	No official flag.
Oldenburg-Land				No official flag or coat of arms.
Ostholstein-Mitte			8 April 2008	No official flag.

== Pinneberg ==
=== Amt ===
Flag	Amt	Date	Description
	Elmshorn-Land	TBA	No official flag.
	Geest und Marsch Südholstein	TBA	No official flag.
	Hörnerkirchen	TBA	No official flag.
	Pinnau	TBA	No official flag.
	Rantzau	30 January 1998 –	Blue flag with the coat of arms. The first and fourth quarters comes from the County of Rantzau. The ten black lozenges represents the municipalities. The blue bend sinister wavy represents the Krückau river. The arrangement of lozenges is said to represent Lutzhorn (three), Hemdingen (four) and Bevern (three). Designed by Hannelore von Engelhardt.

== Plön ==
=== Amt ===
Flag	Amt	Date	Description
	Bokhorst-Wankendorf	27 May 2010 –	Banner of arms. The grain of ears from the coat of arms of the former Amt Wankendorf to represent the four municipalities. The wavy pattern represents the creeks and lakes. Designed by Henning Höppner.
	Bordesholm	13 March 2008 –	Banner of arms. The farm and leaves (which is said to be linked to a linden tree) comes from the old coat of arms. The book is also from the old coat of arms. However, the number of leaves are two instead of thirteen (representing the municipalities). Blue represents Bordesholmer See and the Eider river. Designed by Uwe Nagel.
	Großer Plöner See	TBA	No official flag.
	Lütjenburg	TBA	No official flag.
	Preetz-Land	TBA	No official flag.
	Probstei	31 October 2002 –	Banner of arms. Designed by Henning Höppner.
	Schrevenborn	TBA	No official flag.
	Selent/Schlesen	25 February 2008 –	Blue flag with the coat of arms. Designed by Henning Höppner.

== Rendsburg-Eckernförde ==
=== Amt ===
Flag	Amt	Date	Description
	Achterwehr	TBA	No official flag.
	Berkenthin	TBA	No official flag.
	Dänischenhagen	TBA	No official flag.
	Dänischer Wohld	10 December 2008 –	Banner of arms. The leaves represents the eight municipalities. The white cross on red represents Denmark that Schleswig-Holstein used to be part of. The flag alludes to the name of the Amt. Designed by Henning Höppner.
	Eiderkanal	TBA	No official flag.
	Flintbek	TBA	No official flag.
	Fockbek	TBA	No official flag.
	Hohner Harde	3 September 1998 –	Banner of arms. The green hill represents Eichberg, which gave the amt's name. The rooster represents the history of the Harde area. The leaves represents the twelve municipalities. Green represents the Amt's rural environment while yellow represents Schleswig. Fesigned by Manfred Rüthlein.
	Hüttener Berge	1 January 2008 –	A horizontal green-yellow bicolor flag with the coat of arms. The coat of arms represents the Amt's reputation as a hunting lodge. Fesigned by Uwe Nagel.
	Jevenstedt	TBA	No official flag.
	Mittelholstein	TBA	

=== Municipalities ===
Flag	Municipality	Date	Description
	Achterwehr	TBA	No official flag.
	Ascheffel	12 April 1989 –	Banner of arms. The flag represents the "Scheffel an der Au", which the municipality gets its name from. The bushel and the ears of grain represents agriculture. The blue wavy line represents the Rohau river, located in the east. The three yellow hills represents the Hüttener mountains. Gold represents harvest and the Hüttener Berge. Blue and yellow are the traditional colours of Schleswig. Designed by Manfred Rüthlein.
	Ahlefeld-Bistensee	14 May 1998 –	The flag was originally belonged to Bistensee. The mountain represents the Hütten Hills. Yellow represents the bloom of rapeseed. The fish in the blue represents the Binsensee. Designed by Mr. & Mrs. Kohrt and Uwe Nagel.
	Borgstedt	30 January 1998 –	Banner of arms. The white wavy line that represents the Eider River, the Eider Canal and the Kiel Canal and their contribution to shipping. The wheel represents mobility. As the most striking manifestation of modern man's restlessness, the A7 motorway touches the municipal area in the north-east. The dingstock represents togetherness. Green represents nature. Designed by Wolfgang Wissenbach.
	Bredenbek	7 November 1996 –	Designed by Reinhard Siedenburg.
	Brekendorf	22 August 1996 –	Banner of arms. The ant represents the ant plague (which destroyed the former location) that gave the municipality its name. The Dreiberg symbolizes the location of the town in the middle of hills on the edge of the "Hüttener Berge". The disc represents archaeology. Yellow and blue are the colours of Schleswig. Designed by Uwe Nagel.
	Bünsdorf	17 September 1990 –	Banner of arms. The red church represents the local church. The blue wavy lines represents the Westensee. The green leaves represents the Hüttener Berge. The total number of leaves represents the settlements that made up the municipality (Bünsdorf, Schirnau, Steinrade and Wentorf). Designed by Alice Thomsen.
	Damendorf	7 January 1985 –	Banner of arms. The wolf represents the past presence of the animal in the municipality. The oak trees and the hills represents the Hüttener Berge. The gravestone represents archaeology. Blue and yellow are colours of Schleswig. Designed by Manfred Rüthlein.
	Felde	4 May 1993 –	Banner of arms. Designed by Uwe Nagel and Reinhard Siedenburg.
	Groß Wittensee	14 March 2017 –	Banner of arms. The alludes to the location of the municipality and the "Hüttener Berge" nature park. White hills and the trees represents wooden hilly landscape. The trees also represent the "Hüttener Harde". The flag serves as a testimony to the traditional forest wealth of the district. The blue wavy lines the Wittensee. Designed by Uwe Nagel.
	Haby	22 August 2000 –	Banner of arms. The three horseshoes represents blacksmiths and farmers. The wild rose alludes to the name of the town. White represents the Schilksee and Westensee lakes. Designed by Uwe Nagel.
	Holtsee	11 October 1993 –	Banner of arms. The oak tree and the waves represents the origin of the municipality's name. The name comes from a lake located in the Danish Wohlds forest area. Gold represents agriculture. Designed by Alice Thomsen.
	Holzbunge	21 August 1995 –	Banner of arms. The beech and oak leaves and the wooden lodge represents the origin of the municipality's name. Its name means "built at the woods". The lodge represents construction and the leaves represents forests. Designed by Uwe Nagel.
	Hütten	TBA	No official flag.
	Klein Wittensee	TBA	No official flag.
	Krummwisch	TBA	No official flag.
	Melsdorf	5 May 2008 –	Banner of arms. Designed by Manfred Rüthlein.
	Neu Duvenstedt	TBA	No official flag.
	Osterby (Rendsburg)	21 June 1999 –	Banner of arms. Designed by Uwe Nagel.
	Ottendorf	24 May 1992 –	A blue-white-blue flag with the coat of arms. Designed by Manfred Rüthlein.
	Owschlag	9 March 2000 –	Banner of arms. Designed by Heinz Hentschel.
	Quarnbek	24 October 2002 –	Banner of arms. Designed by Gerlind Lind.
	Sehestedt	24 November 1998 –	Banner of arms. Designed by Heinz Reinhold and Alice Thomsen.
	Westensee	21 February 1990 –	Banner of arms. Designed by Manfred Rüthlein.

== Schleswig-Flensburg ==
=== Municipalities ===
Flag	Municipality	Date	Description
	Achtrup	TBA	No official flag.
	Ahrensbök	22 January 1941 –	
	Ahrenshöft	TBA	No official flag.
	Ahrenshöft	TBA	No official flag.
	Ahrenviölfeld	TBA	No official flag.
	Albsfelde	TBA	No official flag.
	Alkersum	TBA	No official flag.
	Almdorf	TBA	No official flag.
	Arkebek	TBA	No official flag.
	Arlewatt	TBA	No official flag.
	Aukrug		
	Albersdorf	24 March 1980 –	
	Bargum	TBA	No official flag.
	Barlt	TBA	No official flag.
	Basedow	TBA	No official flag.
	Behrendorf	TBA	No official flag.
	Belau	TBA	No official flag.
	Bohmstedt	TBA	No official flag.
	Bokel	TBA	No official flag.
	Bokholt-Hanredder	TBA	No official flag.
	Bondelum	TBA	No official flag.
	Bordelum	TBA	No official flag.
	Borgsum	TBA	No official flag.
	Braderup	TBA	No official flag.
	Bramstedtlund	TBA	No official flag.
	Brande-Hörnerkirchen	TBA	No official flag.
	Bröthen	TBA	No official flag.
	Buchhorst	TBA	No official flag.
	Dunsum	TBA	No official flag.
	Ellerhoop	TBA	No official flag.
	Ellhöft	TBA	No official flag.
	Elmenhorst (Lauenburg)	TBA	No official flag.
	Elpersbüttel	TBA	No official flag.
	Embühren	TBA	No official flag.
	Emmelsbüll-Horsbüll	TBA	No official flag.
	Escheburg	TBA	No official flag.
	Fahren	TBA	No official flag.
	Fredeburg	TBA	No official flag.
	Fresendelf	TBA	No official flag.
	Friedrich-Wilhelm-Lübke-Koog	TBA	No official flag.
	Fuhlenhagen	TBA	No official flag.
	Garding (Kirchspiel)	TBA	No official flag.
	Giesensdorf	TBA	No official flag.
	Grabau (Lauenburg)	TBA	No official flag.
	Gröde	TBA	No official flag.
	Groß Offenseth-Aspern	TBA	No official flag.
	Großharrie	TBA	No official flag.
	Grothusenkoog	TBA	No official flag.
	Gudendorf	TBA	No official flag.
	Gülzow	TBA	No official flag.
	Haseldorf	TBA	No official flag.
	Hattstedtermarsch	TBA	No official flag.
	Havekost	TBA	No official flag.
	Hemdingen	TBA	No official flag.
	Holm (Nordfriesland)	TBA	No official flag.
	Hooge	TBA	No official flag.
	Hörsten	TBA	No official flag.
	Hude	TBA	No official flag.
	Humptrup	TBA	No official flag.
	Immenstedt (Dithmarschen)	TBA	No official flag.
	Immenstedt (Nordfriesland)	TBA	No official flag.
	Juliusburg	TBA	No official flag.
	Kalübbe	TBA	No official flag.
	Karlum	TBA	No official flag.
	Kirchnüchel	TBA	No official flag.
	Klein Zecher	TBA	No official flag.
	Kletkamp	TBA	No official flag.
	Köthel (Lauenburg)	TBA	No official flag.
	Kotzenbüll	TBA	No official flag.
	Klanxbüll	TBA	No official flag.
	Krüzen	TBA	No official flag.
	Kühren	TBA	No official flag.
	Krüzen	TBA	No official flag.
	Kulpin	TBA	No official flag.
	Labenz	TBA	No official flag.
	Langeneß	TBA	No official flag.
	Langenhorn	TBA	No official flag.
	Lanze	TBA	No official flag.
	Lexgaard	TBA	No official flag.
	Linau	TBA	No official flag.
	Luhnstedt	TBA	No official flag.
	Lütau	TBA	No official flag.
	Marnerdeich	TBA	No official flag.
	Midlum	TBA	No official flag.
	Mildstedt	TBA	No official flag.
	Möhnsen	TBA	No official flag.
	Mönkeberg	TBA	No official flag.
	Nebel	TBA	No official flag.
	Nettelsee	TBA	No official flag.
	Neu Duvenstedt	TBA	No official flag.
	Neufelderkoog	TBA	No official flag.
	Neukirchen (Nordfriesland)	TBA	No official flag.
	Nieblum	TBA	No official flag.
	Norddorf	TBA	No official flag.
	Norderfriedrichskoog	TBA	No official flag.
	Nordermeldorf	TBA	No official flag.
	Norderwöhrden	TBA	No official flag.
	Nordstrand	TBA	No official flag.
	Norstedt	TBA	No official flag.
	Ockholm	TBA	No official flag.
	Odderade	TBA	No official flag.
	Oevenum	TBA	No official flag.
	Offenbüttel	TBA	No official flag.
	Olderup	TBA	No official flag.
	Oldsum	TBA	No official flag.
	Osterhever	TBA	No official flag.
	Osterhorn	TBA	No official flag.
	Oster-Ohrstedt	TBA	No official flag.
	Pahlen	TBA	No official flag.
	Pellworm	TBA	No official flag.
	Poggensee	TBA	No official flag.
	Poppenbüll	TBA	No official flag.
	Raa-Besenbek	TBA	No official flag.
	Ramhusen	TBA	No official flag.
	Rantrum	TBA	No official flag.
	Rickert	TBA	No official flag.
	Rodenäs	TBA	No official flag.
	Römnitz	TBA	No official flag.
	Schillsdorf	TBA	No official flag.
	Schmedeswurth	TBA	No official flag.
	Schönbek	TBA	No official flag.
	Schrum	TBA	No official flag.
	Schwesing	TBA	No official flag.
	Siebeneichen	TBA	No official flag.
	Simonsberg	TBA	No official flag.
	Sprakebüll	TBA	No official flag.
	Stedesand	TBA	No official flag.
	Süderende	TBA	No official flag.
	Süderhöft	TBA	No official flag.
	Südermarsch	TBA	No official flag.
	Tasdorf	TBA	No official flag.
	Techelsdorf	TBA	No official flag.
	Tensbüttel-Röst	TBA	No official flag.
	Tetenbüll	TBA	No official flag.
	Tinningstedt	TBA	No official flag.
	Trennewurth	TBA	No official flag.
	Uphusum	TBA	No official flag.
	Utersum	TBA	No official flag.
	Vollerwiek	TBA	No official flag.
	Volsemenhusen	TBA	No official flag.
	Wangelau	TBA	No official flag.
	Welt	TBA	No official flag.
	Wennbüttel	TBA	No official flag.
	Wentorf (Sandesneben)	TBA	No official flag.
	Westerborstel	TBA	No official flag.
	Westerhever	TBA	No official flag.
	Westre	TBA	No official flag.
	Wester-Ohrstedt	TBA	No official flag.
	Wiemerstedt	TBA	No official flag.
	Wisch (Nordfriesland)	TBA	No official flag.
	Witsum	TBA	No official flag.
	Wittdün	TBA	No official flag.
	Wrohm	TBA	No official flag.

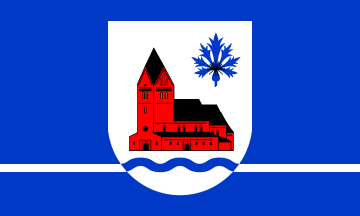
Altenkrempe

Alt Duvenstedt

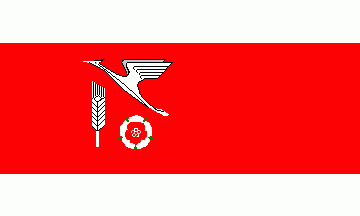
Appen

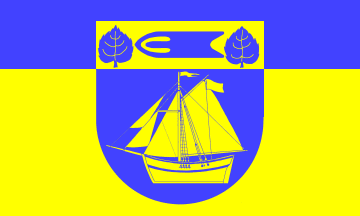
Arnis

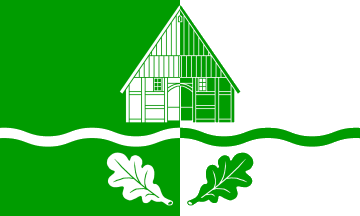
Arpsdorf

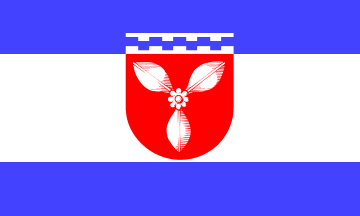
Ascheberg

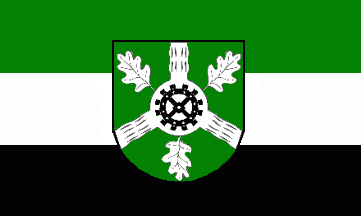
Aumühle

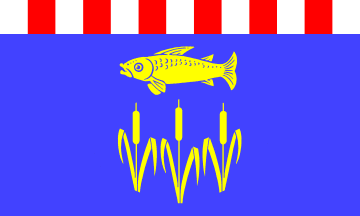
Aventoft

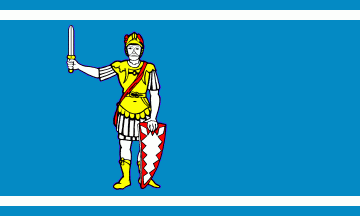
Bad Bramstedt

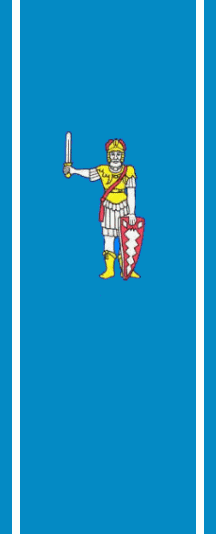
Bad Bramstedt
(variant)

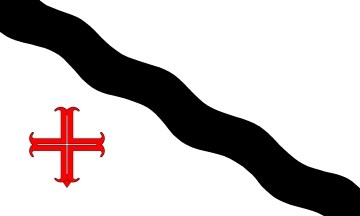
Bad Schwartau

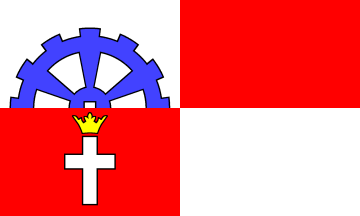
Bäk

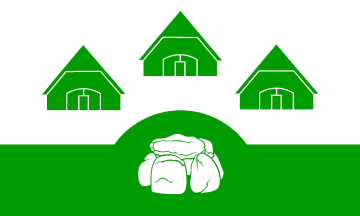
Bargenstedt

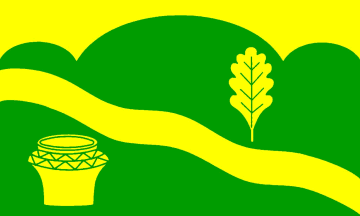
Bargstall

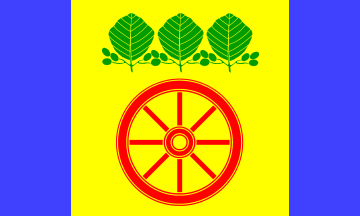
Barmissen

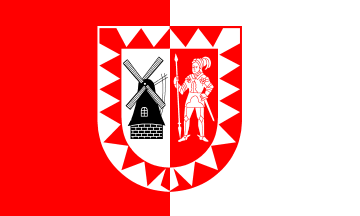
Barmstedt

Barsbek

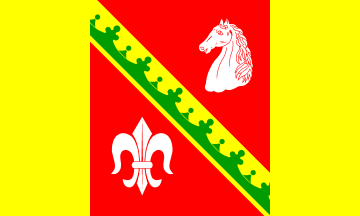
Basthorst

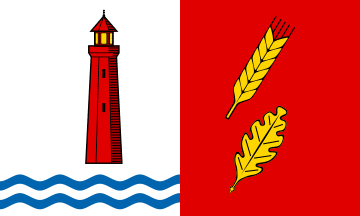
Behrensdorf

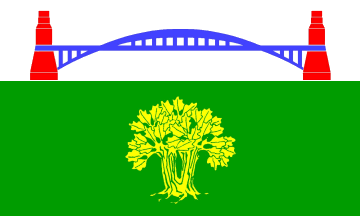
Beldorf

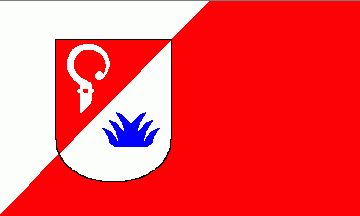
Bendfeld

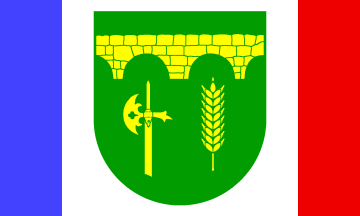
Beschendorf

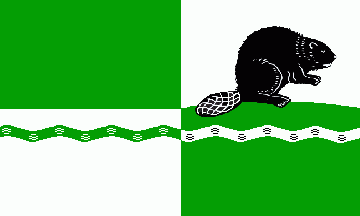
Bevern

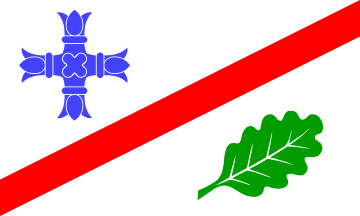
Bilsen

Bissee

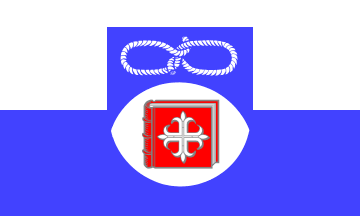
Blekendorf

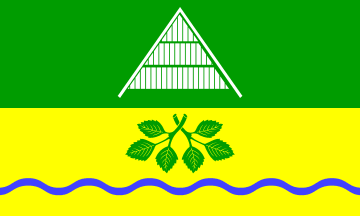
Böhnhusen

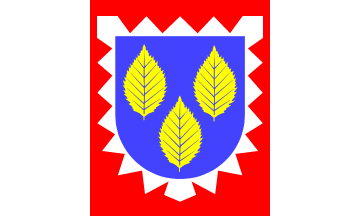
Boksee

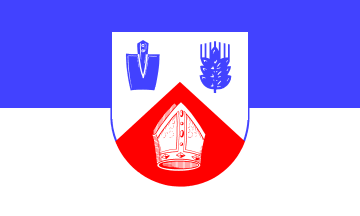
Bönebüttel

Bönningstedt

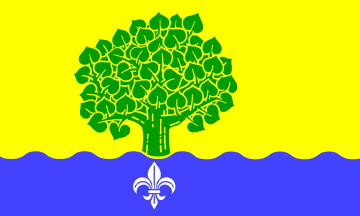
Bordesholm

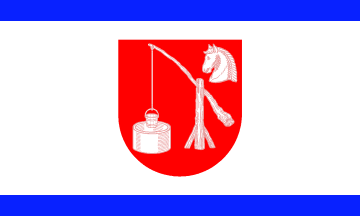
Börnsen

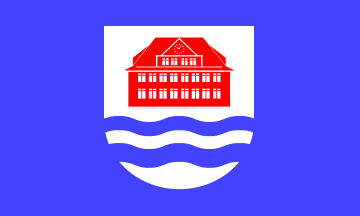
Borstel-Hohenraden

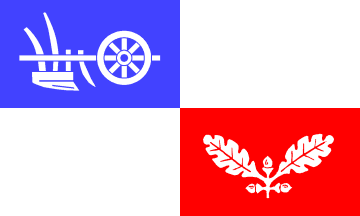
Bösdorf

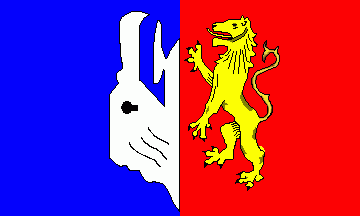
Bosau

Bosbüll

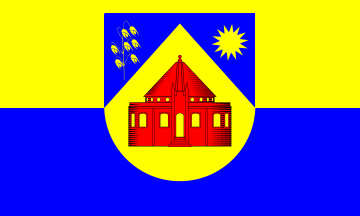
Bothkamp

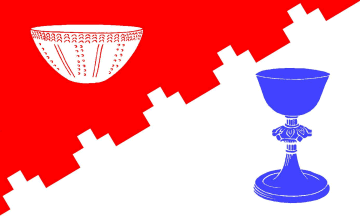
Bovenau

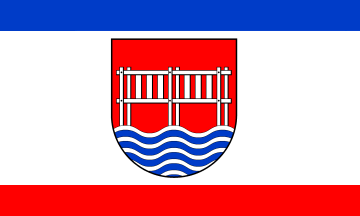
Bredstedt

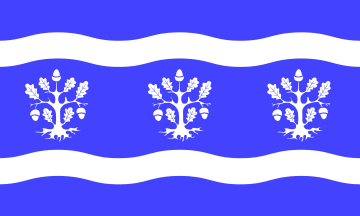
Breiholz

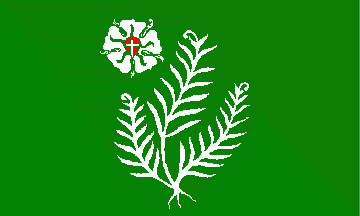
Breklum

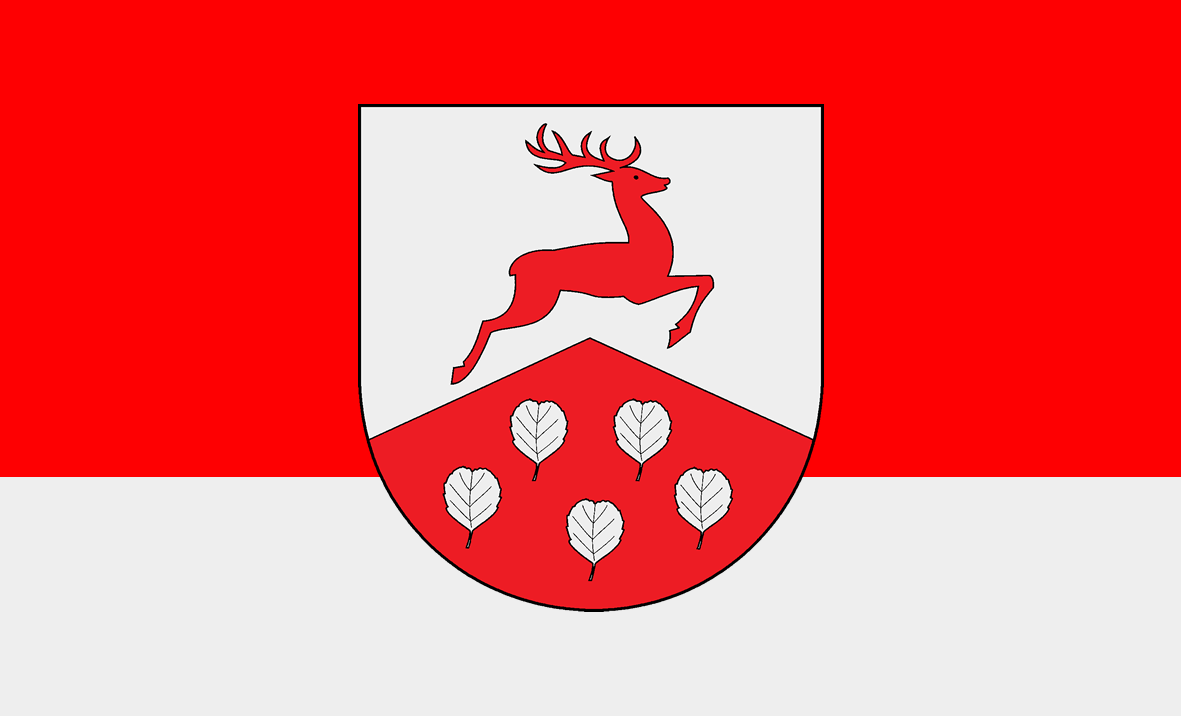
Brinjahe

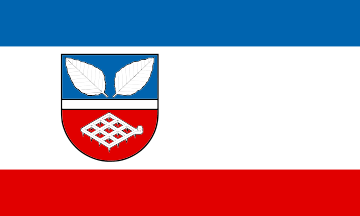
Brodersdorf

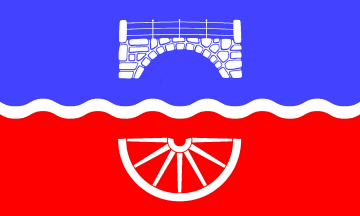
Brügge

Brunsbüttel

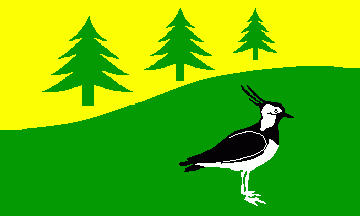
Brunsmark

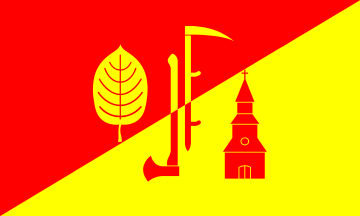
Brunstorf

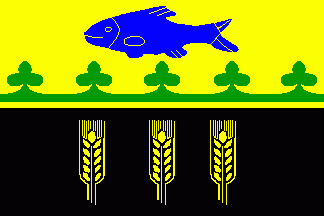
Buchholz (Lauenburg)

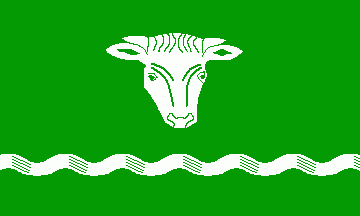
Bullenkuhlen

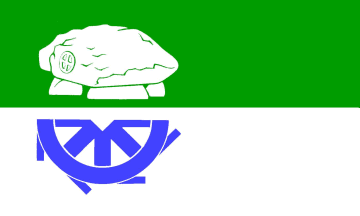
Bunsoh

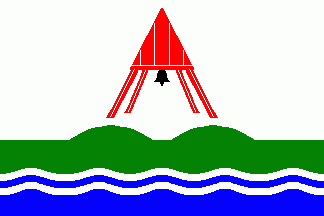
Busenwurth

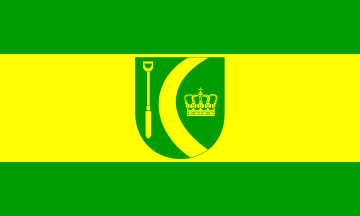
Christiansholm

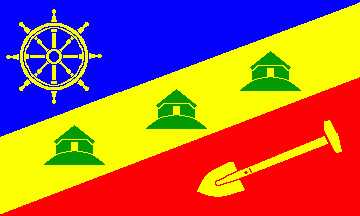
Dagebüll

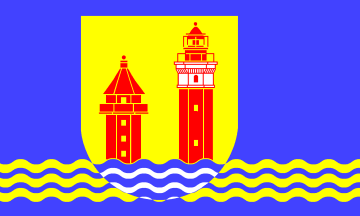
Dahme

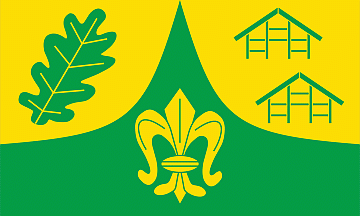
Dahmker

Dalldorf

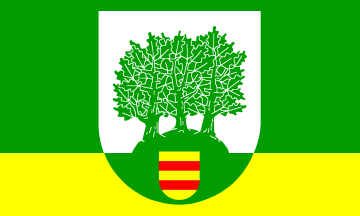
Damlos

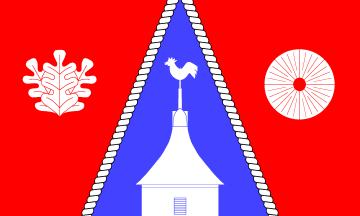
Dänischenhagen

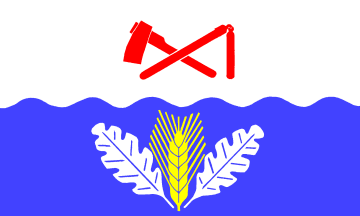
Dannau

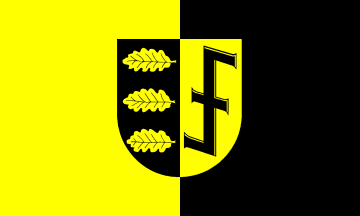
Dassendorf

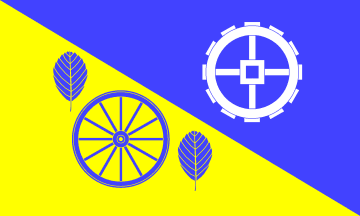
Dersau

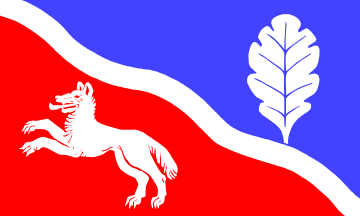
Dobersdorf

Dörnick

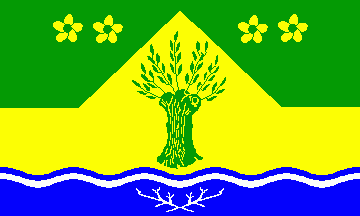
Drage (Nordfriesland)

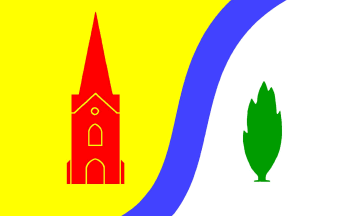
Drelsdorf

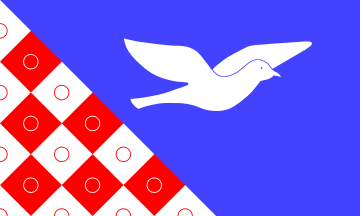
Duvensee

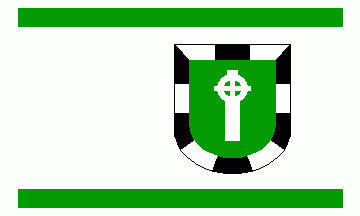
Einhaus

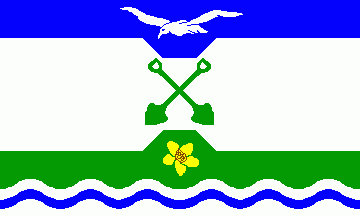
Elisabeth-Sophien-Koog

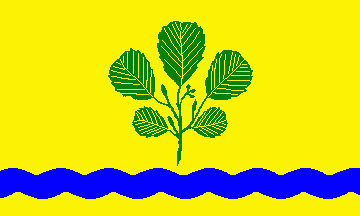
Ellerbek

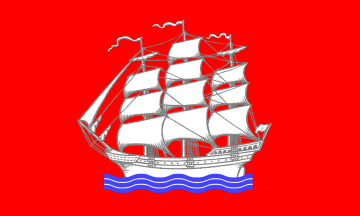
Elmshorn

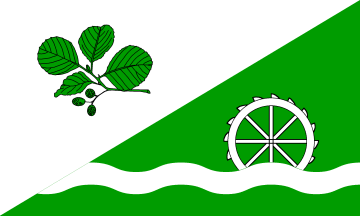
Elsdorf-Westermühlen

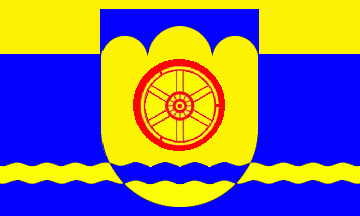
Enge-Sande

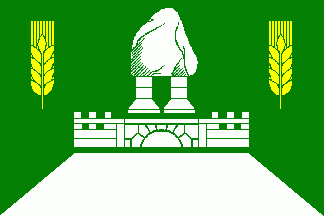
Epenwöhrden

Eutin

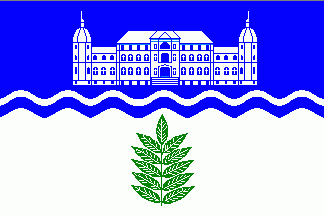
Fargau-Pratjau

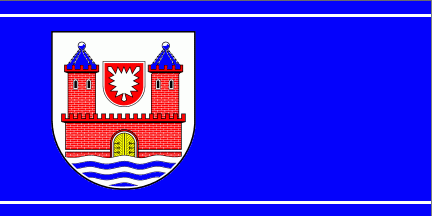
Fehmarn

Fehmarn (variant)

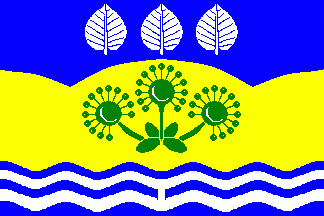
Felm

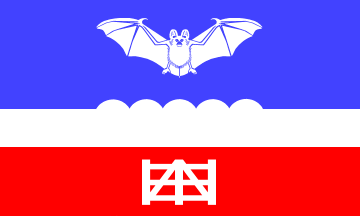
Fiefbergen

Fitzen

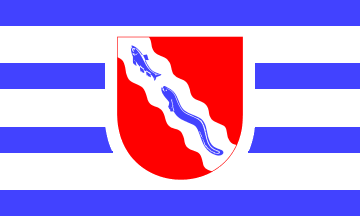
Fockbek

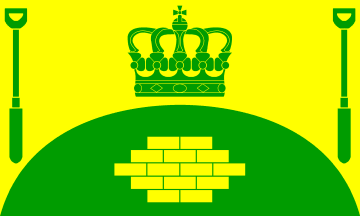
Friedrichsholm

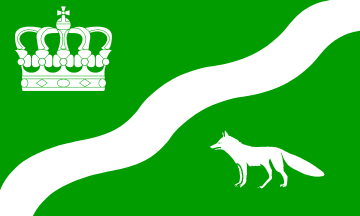
Friedrichsgraben

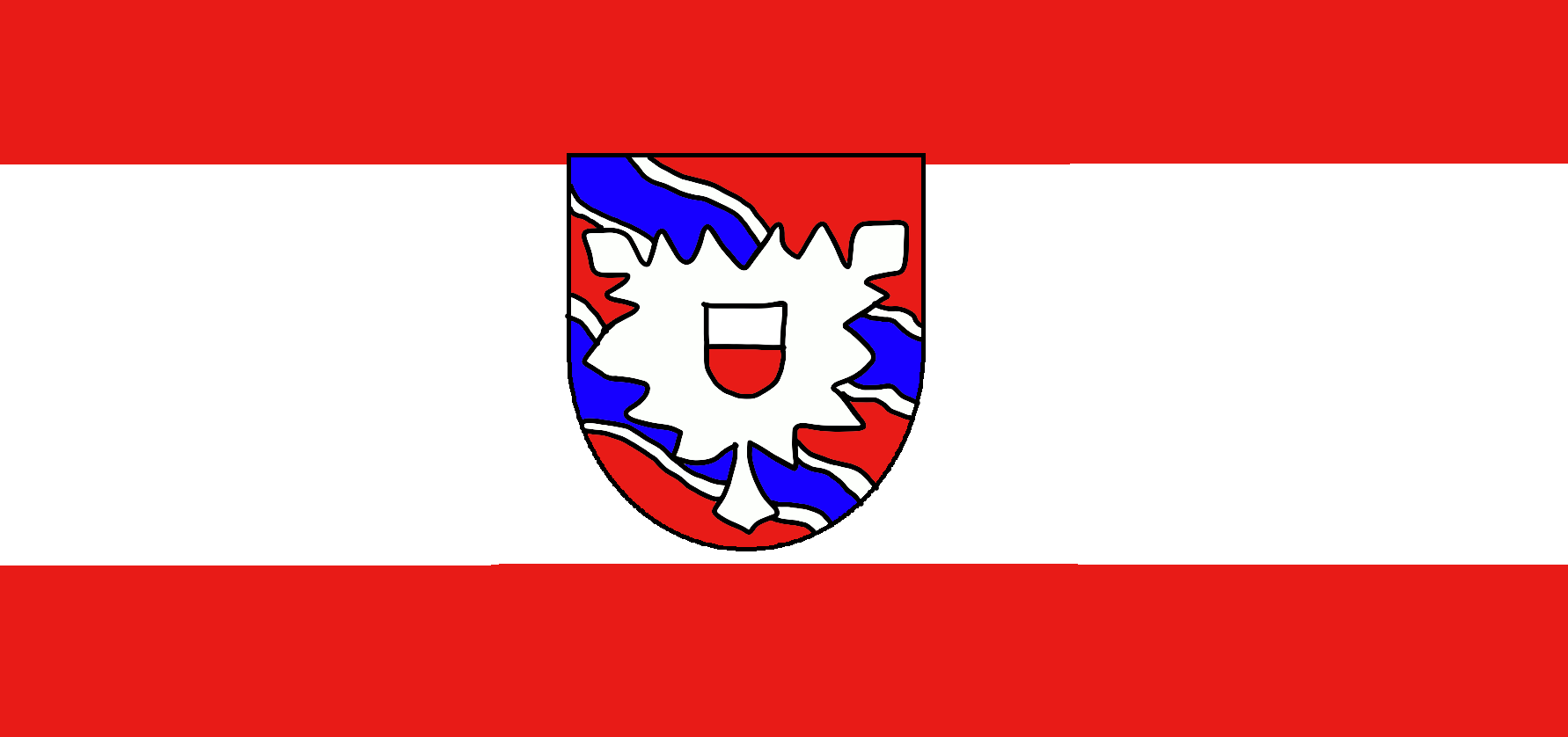
Friedrichstadt

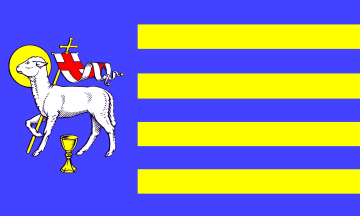
Garding

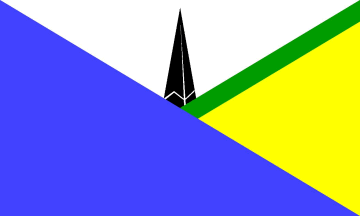
Galmsbüll

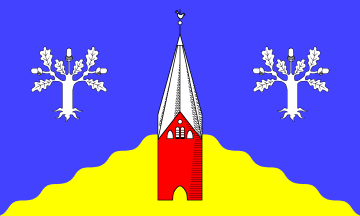
Gettorf

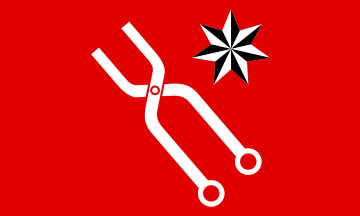
Giekau

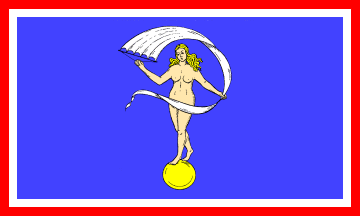
Glückstadt

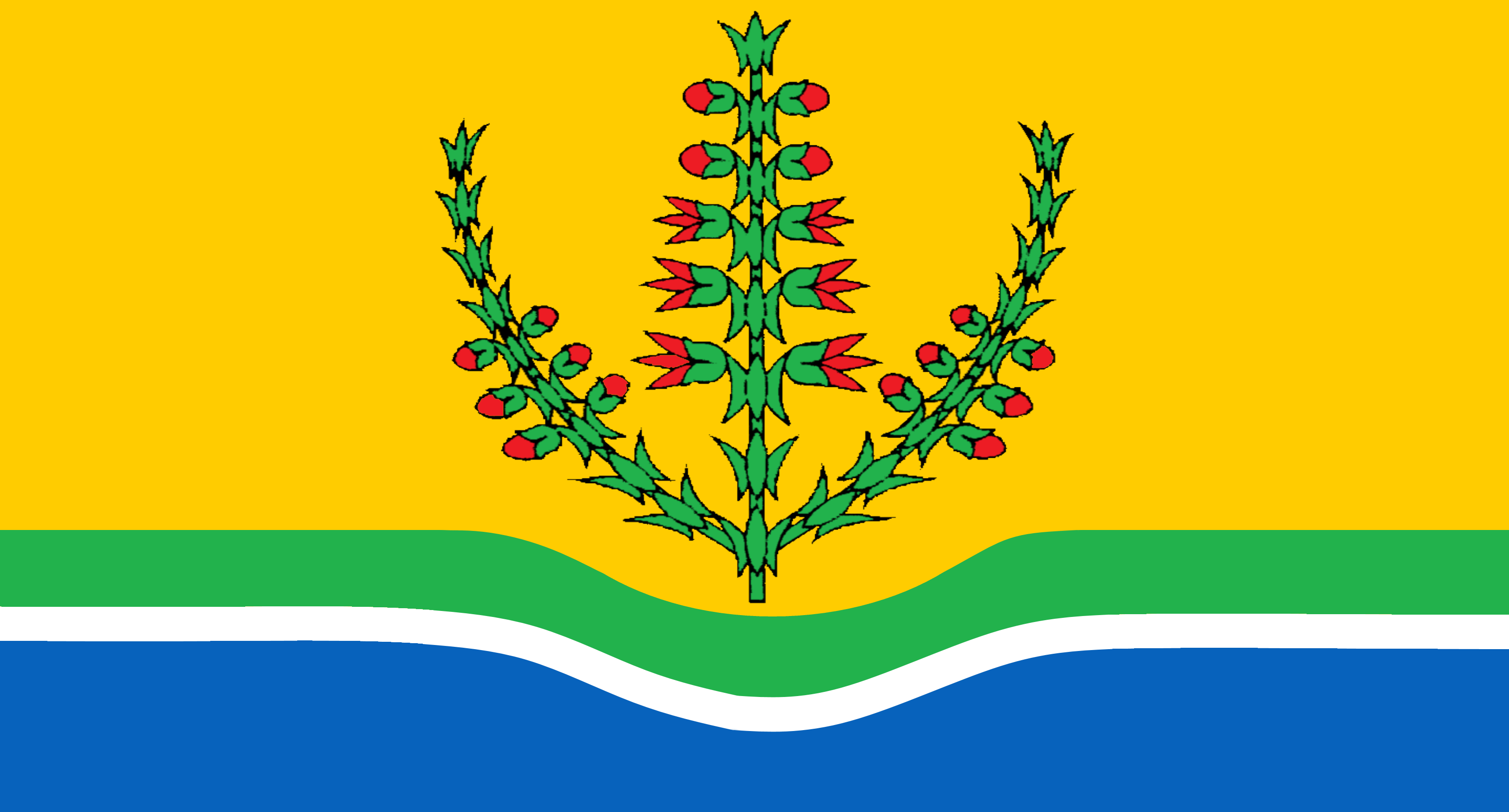
Göhl

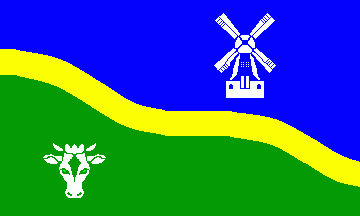
Goldebek

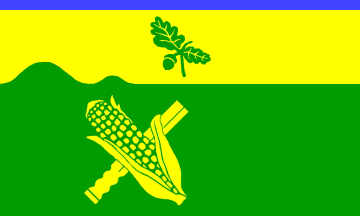
Goldelund

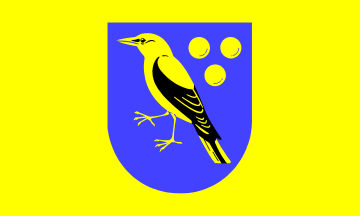
Göttin

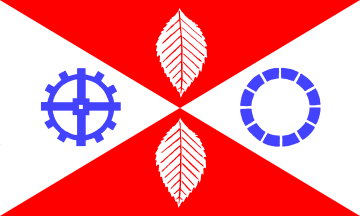
Grebin

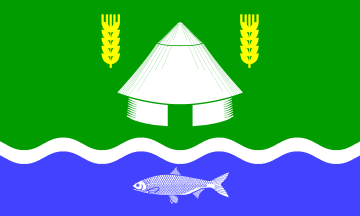
Gremersdorf

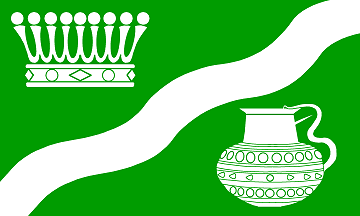
Grevenkrug

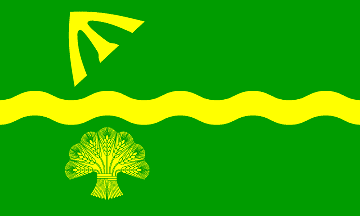
Grinau

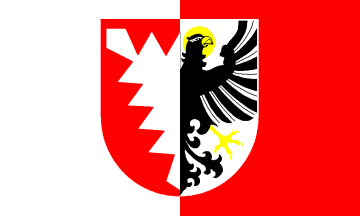
Grömitz

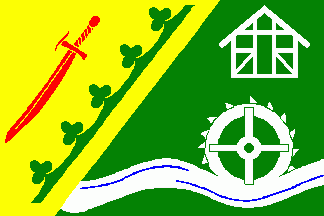
Groß Boden

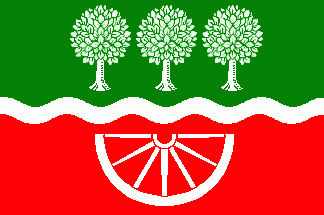
Groß Buchwald

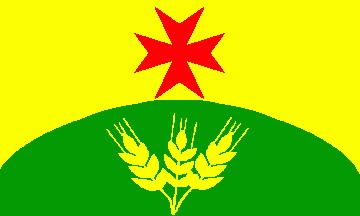
Groß Disnack

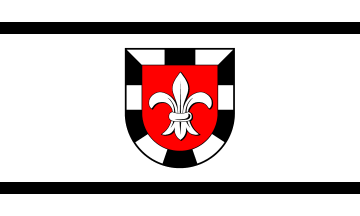
Groß Grönau

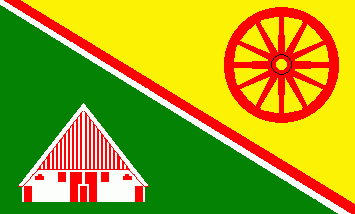
Groß Nordende

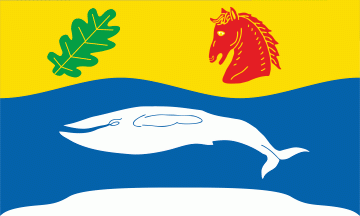
Groß Pampau

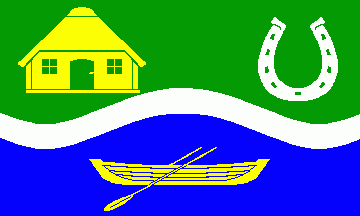
Groß Sarau

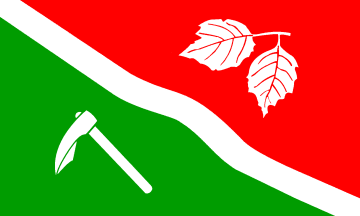
Groß Schenkenberg

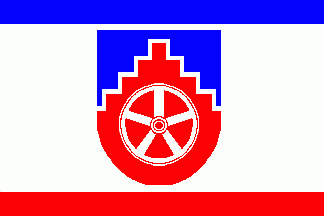
Großbarkau

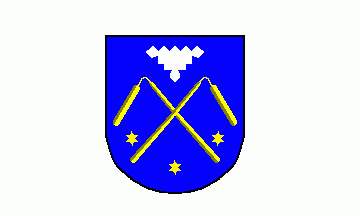
Großenbrode

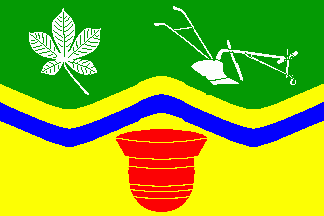
Grove

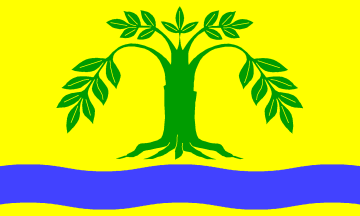
Grube

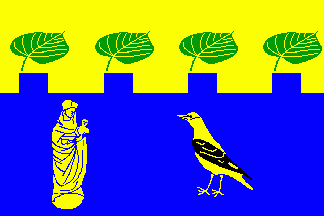
Gudow

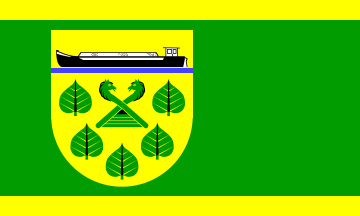
Güster

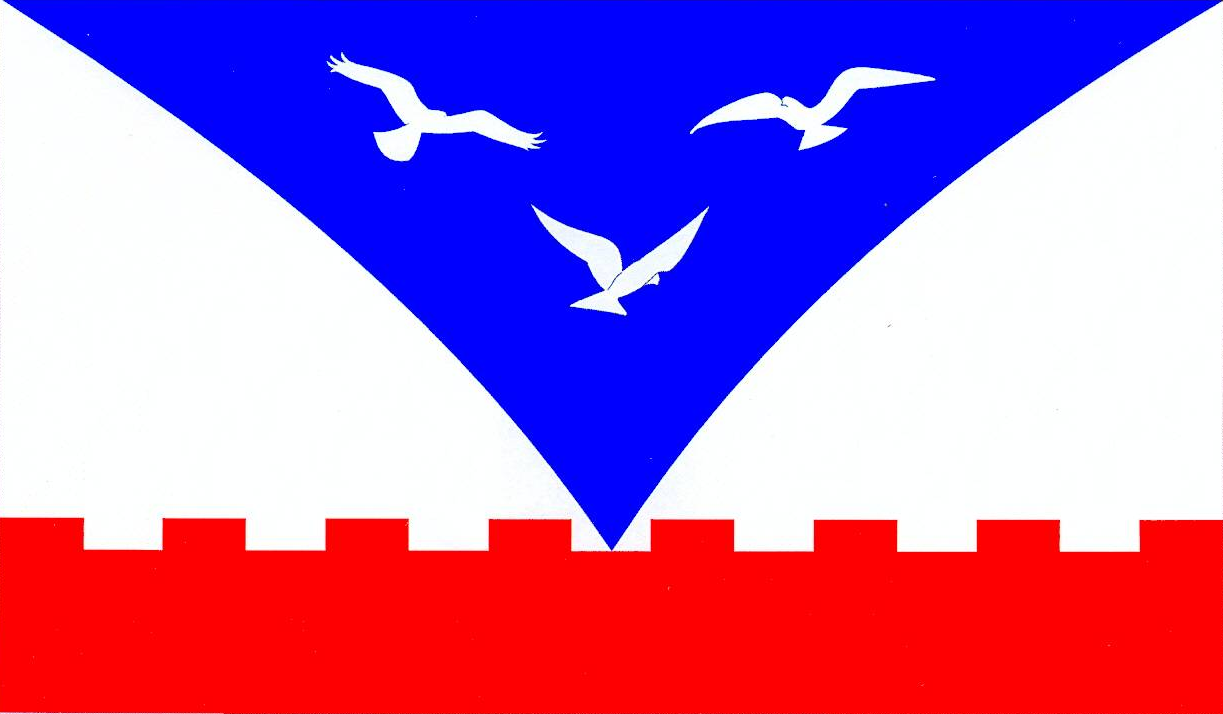
Haale

Halstenbek

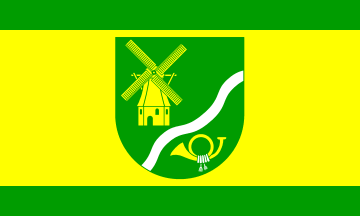
Hamfelde (Lauenburg)

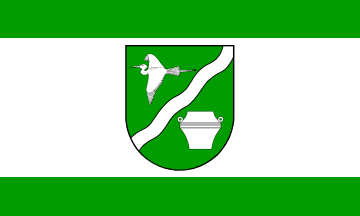
Hamdorf

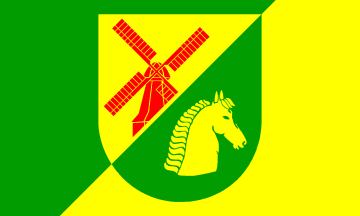
Hamwarde

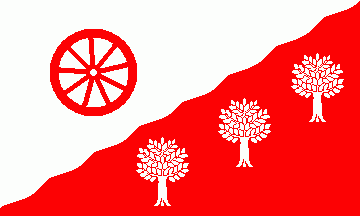
Hamweddel

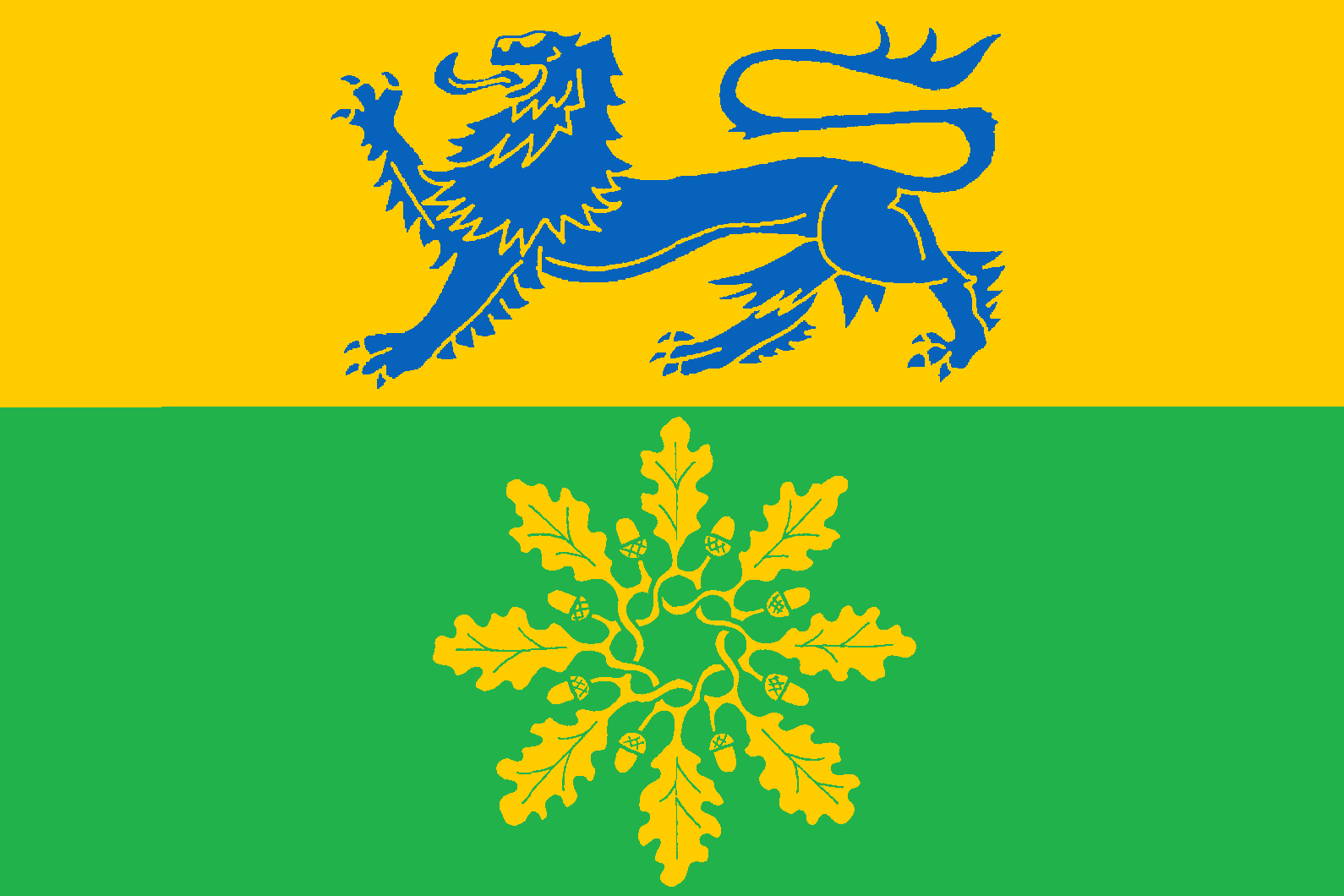
Handewitt

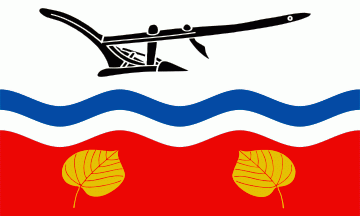
Harmsdorf (Lauenburg)

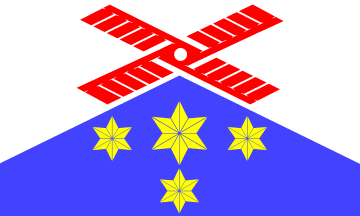
Harmsdorf (Ostholstein)

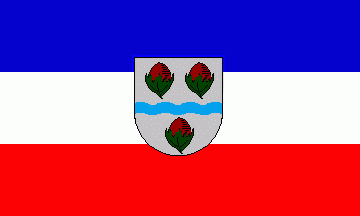
Haselau

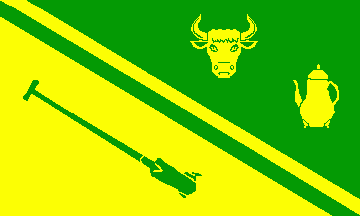
Haselund

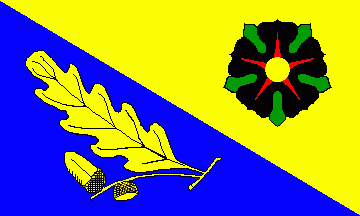
Hasloh

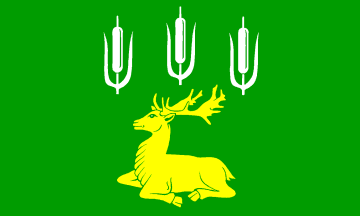
Haßmoor

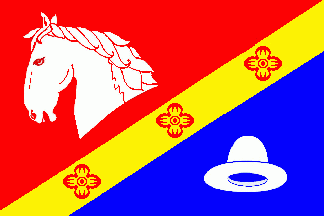
Hattstedt

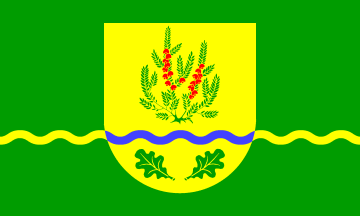
Heede

Heide

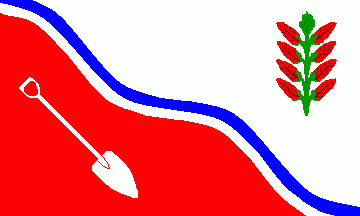
Heidgraben

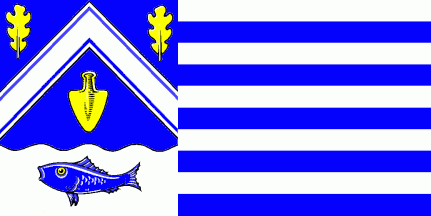
Heikendorf

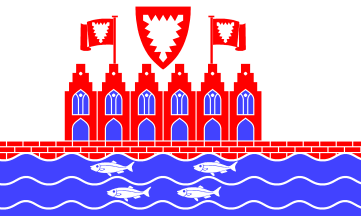
Heiligenhafen

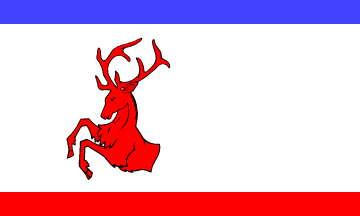
Heist

Heligoland

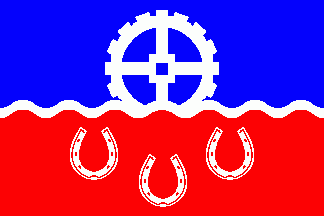
Helmstorf

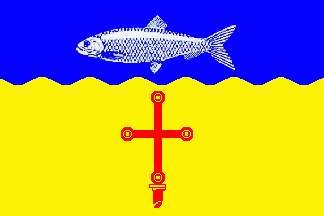
Heringsdorf

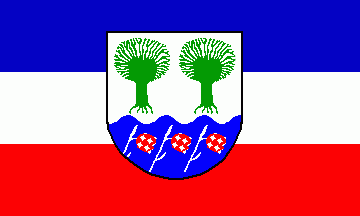
Hetlingen

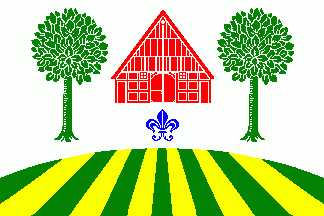
Hoffeld

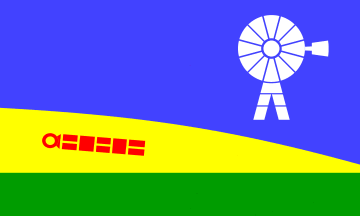
Högel

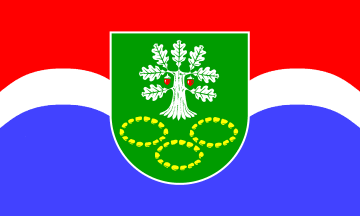
Högsdorf

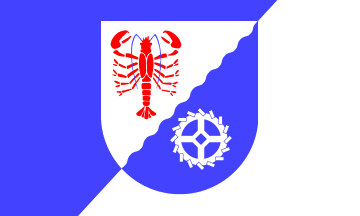
Hohenfelde (Plön)

Hohenhorn

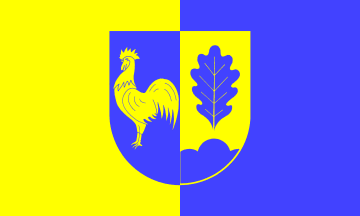
Hohn

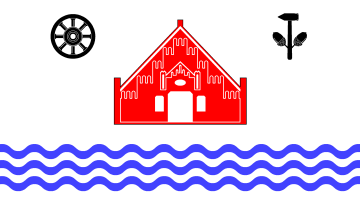
Höhndorf

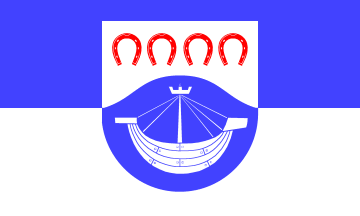
Hohwacht

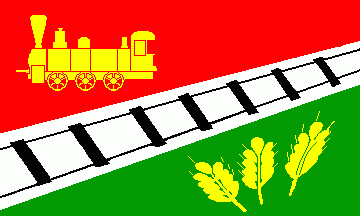
Hollenbek

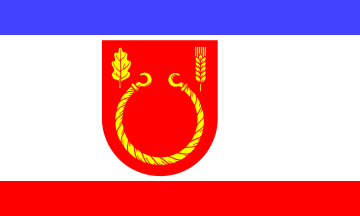
Holm (Pinneberg)

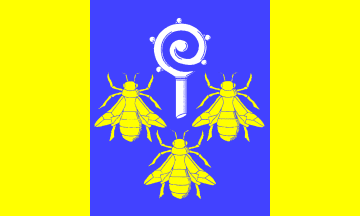
Honigsee

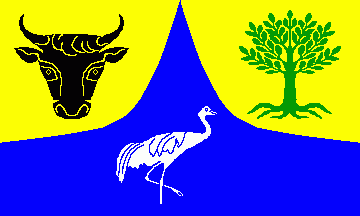
Horst (Lauenburg)

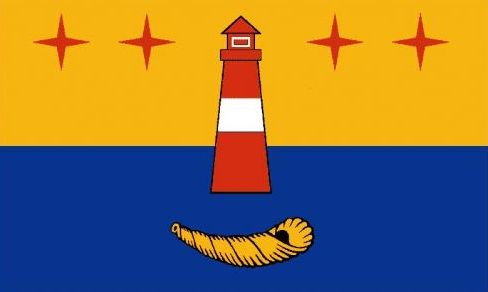
Hörnum

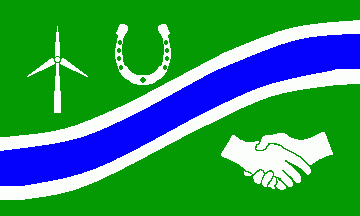
Horstedt

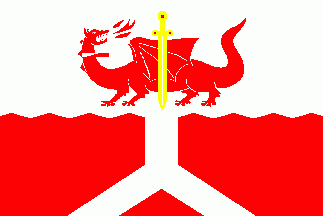
Jevenstedt

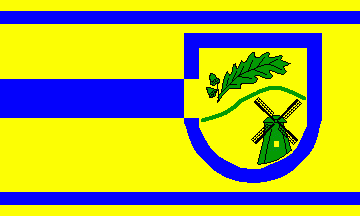
Joldelund

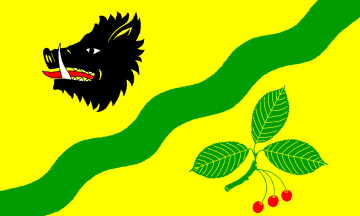
Kabelhorst

Kampen

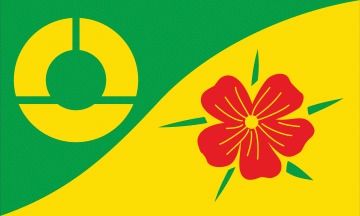
Kankelau

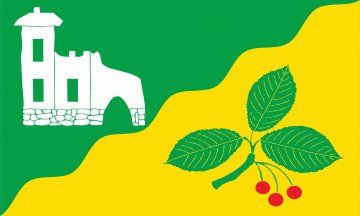
Kasseburg

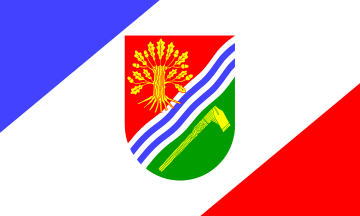
Kasseedorf

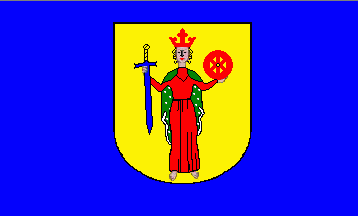
Katharinenheerd

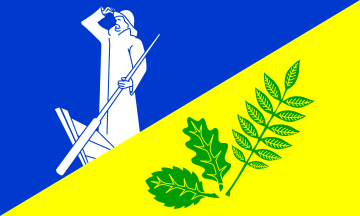
Kellenhusen

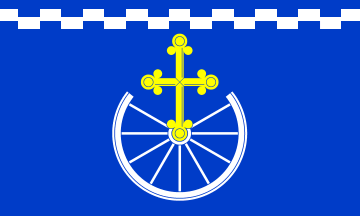
Kirchbarkau

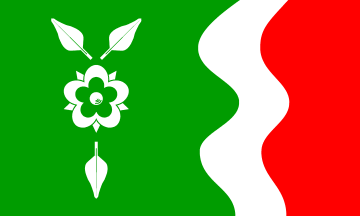
Kittlitz

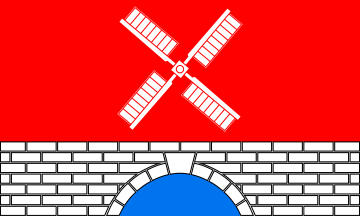
Klein Barkau

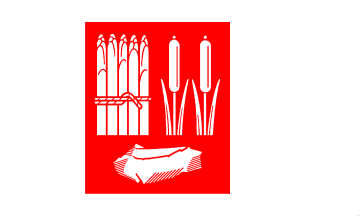
Klein Nordende

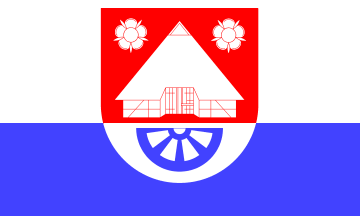
Klein Offenseth-Sparrieshoop

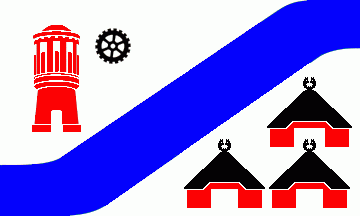
Klein Pampau

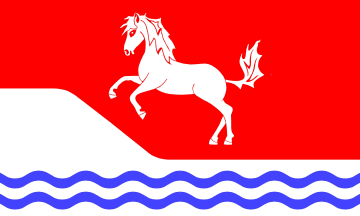
Kleve

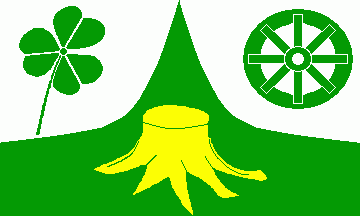
Klinkrade

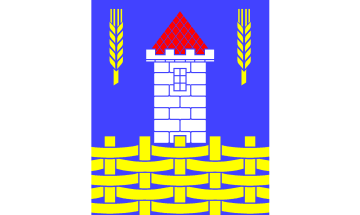
Klixbüll

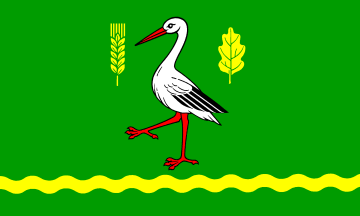
Koberg

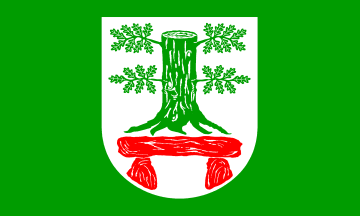
Köhn

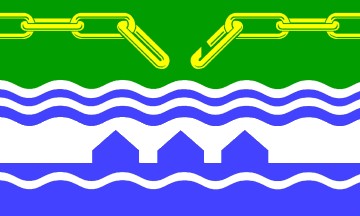
Koldenbüttel

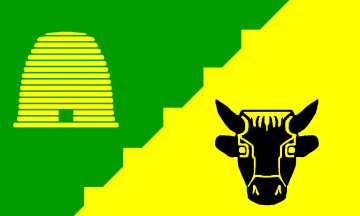
Kolkerheide

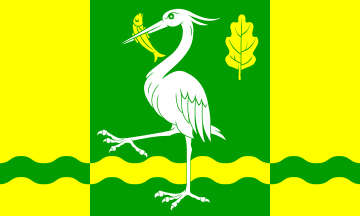
Kölln-Reisiek

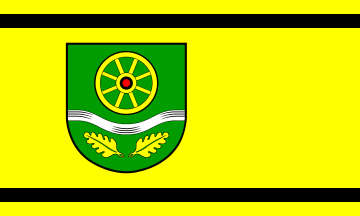
Kollow

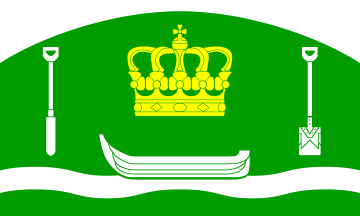
Königshügel

Krokau

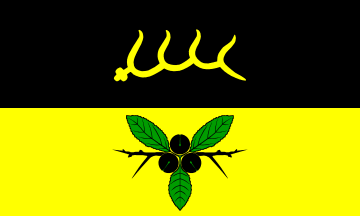
Kröppelshagen-Fahrendorf

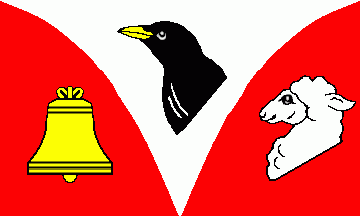
Krukow

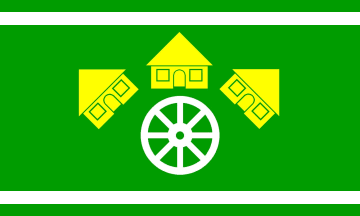
Krumstedt

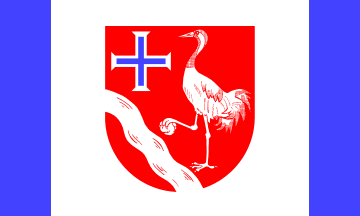
Kuddewörde

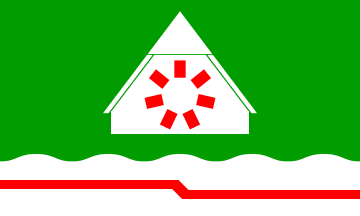
Kühsen

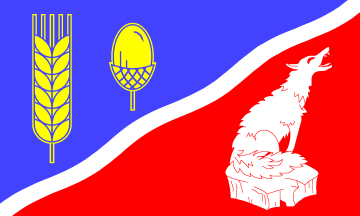
Kummerfeld

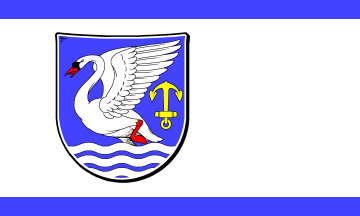
Laboe

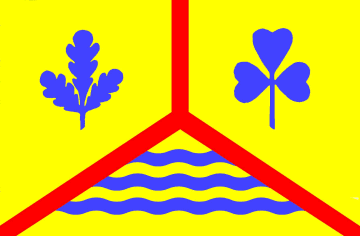
Ladelund

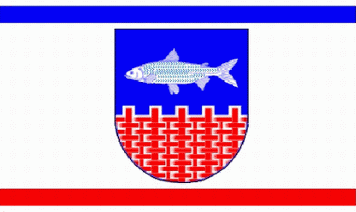
Lammershagen

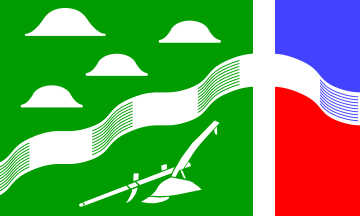
Langeln

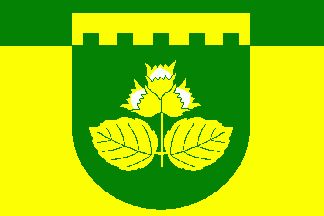
Langenlehsten

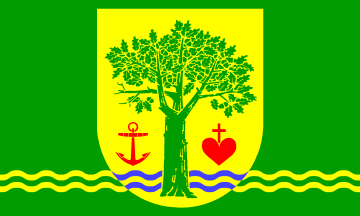
Lankau

Lauenburg

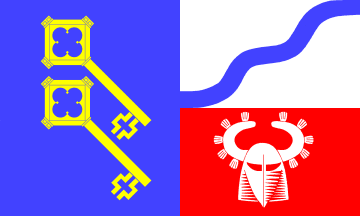
Lebrade

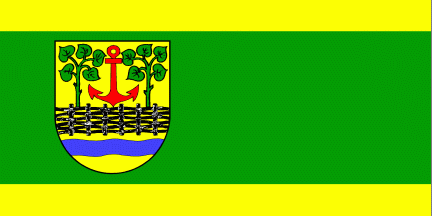
Leck

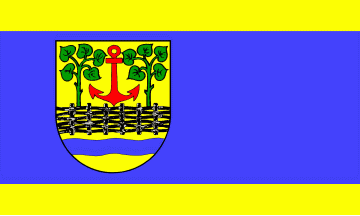
Leck (variant)

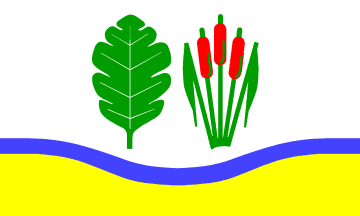
Lehmkuhlen

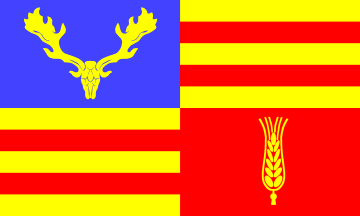
Lensahn

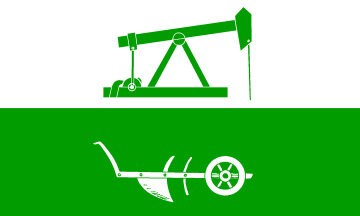
Lieth

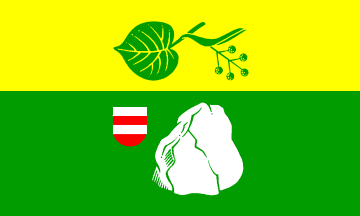
Lindau

List on Sylt

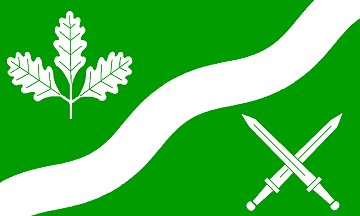
Lohe-Föhrden

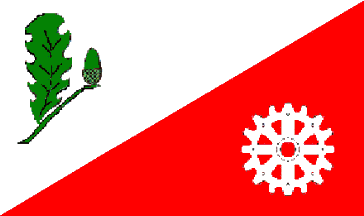
Lohe-Rickelshof

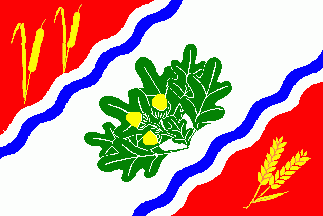
Loop

Löptin

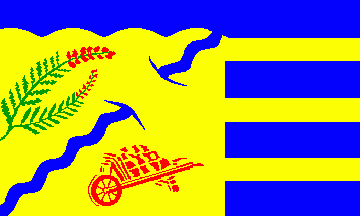
Löwenstedt

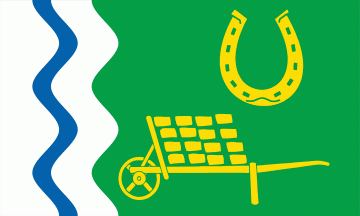
Lüchow

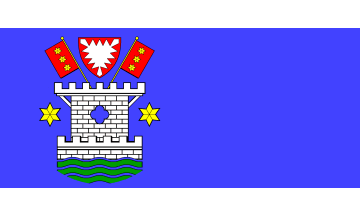
Lütjenburg

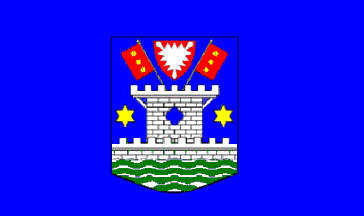
Lütjenburg (variant 1)

Lütjenburg (variant 2)

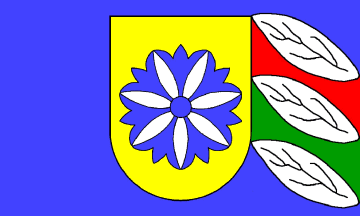
Lütjenholm

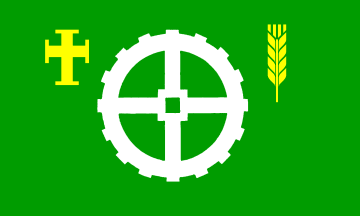
Lutterbek

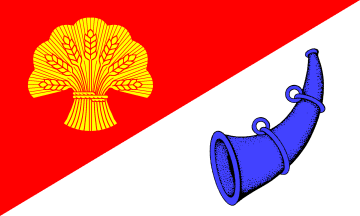
Lutzhorn

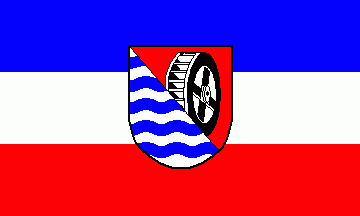
Malente

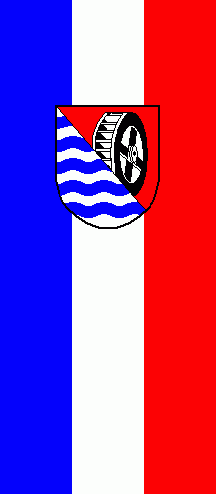
Malente (variant)

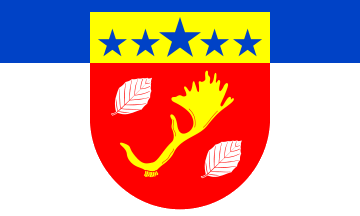
Manhagen

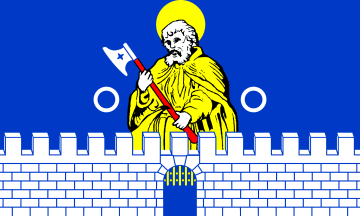
Marne

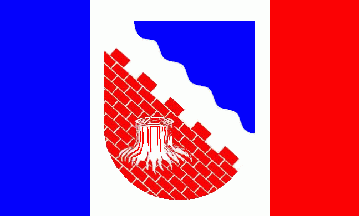
Martensrade

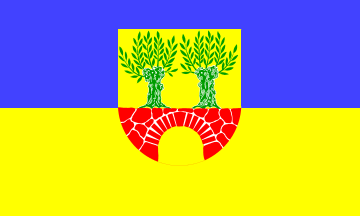
Mechow

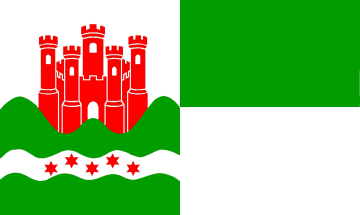
Meldorf

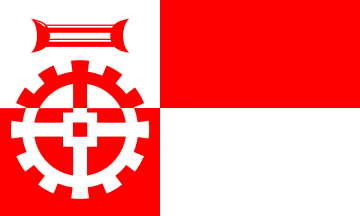
Mölln

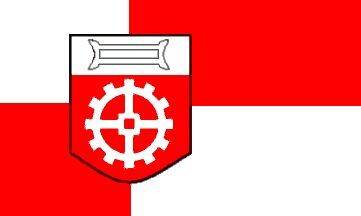
Mölln (variant)

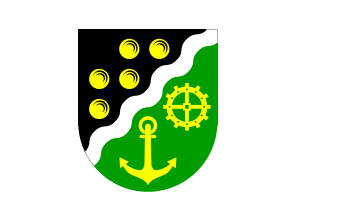
Moorrege

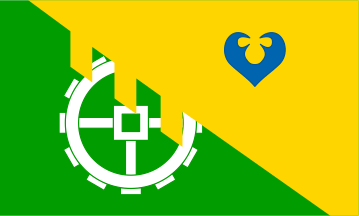
Mucheln

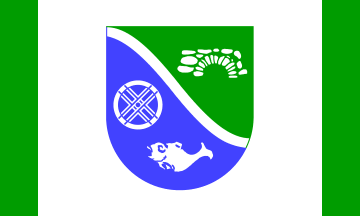
Mühlenrade

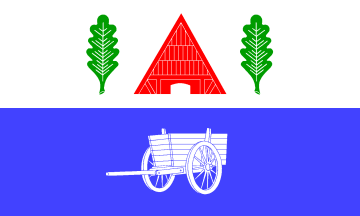
Mühbrook

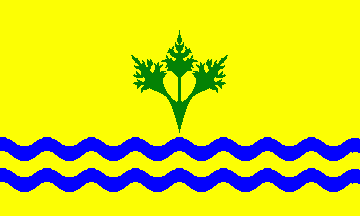
Müssen

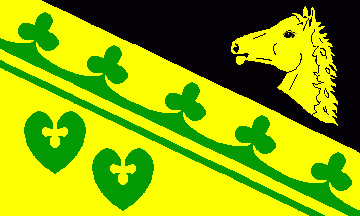
Mustin

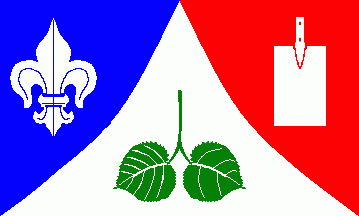
Negenharrie

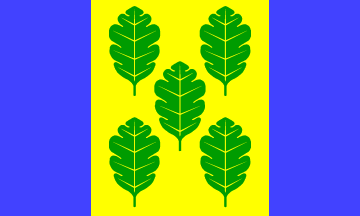
Nehmten

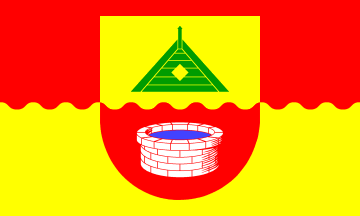
Neudorf-Bornstein

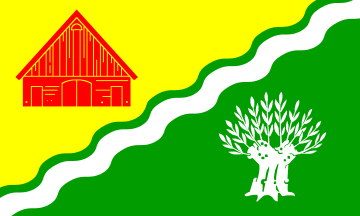
Neuendeich

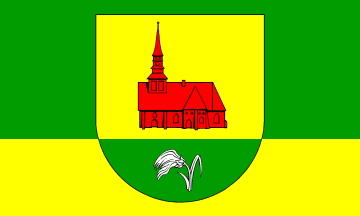
Neuenkirchen

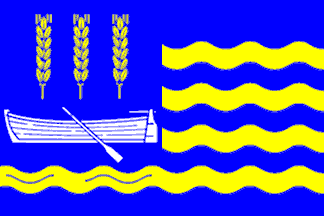
Neufeld

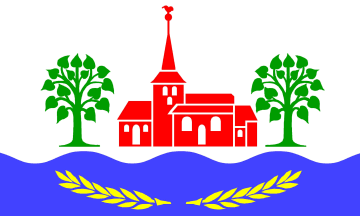
Neukirchen (Ostholstein)

Neumünster

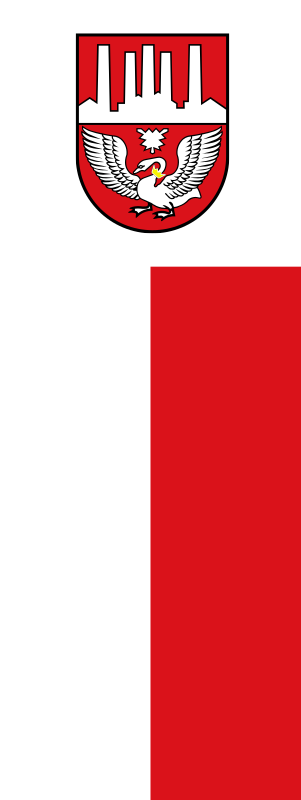
Neumünster (variant)

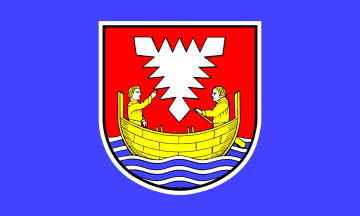
Neustadt in Holstein

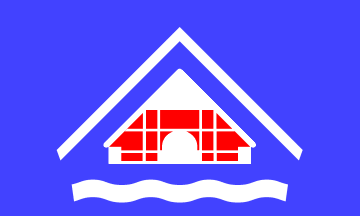
Neuwittenbek

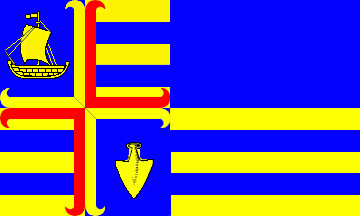
Niebüll

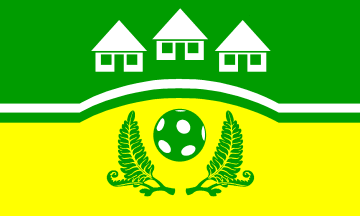
Nindorf

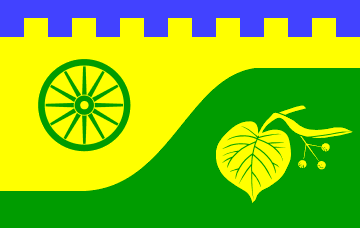
Noer

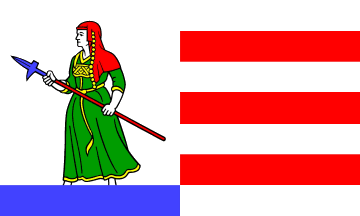
Nordhastedt

Nübbel

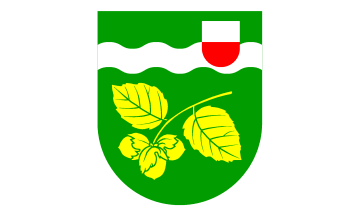
Nusse

Oldenburg in Holstein

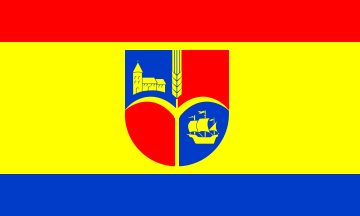
Oldenswort

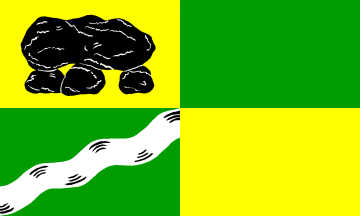
Oldersbek

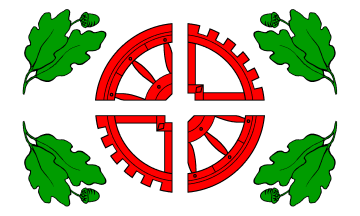
Osdorf

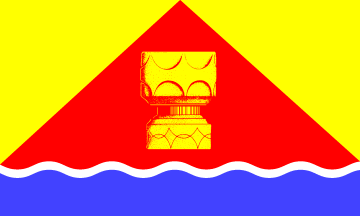
Ostenfeld (Husum)

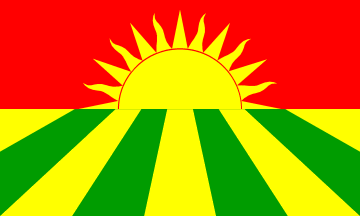
Ostenfeld (Rendsburg)

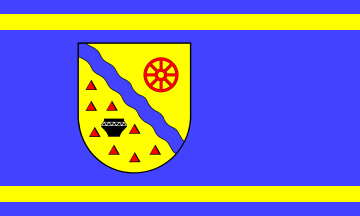
Osterrönfeld

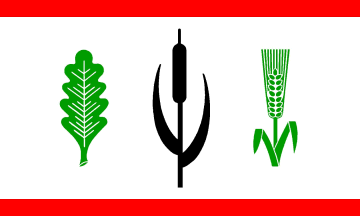
Ostrohe

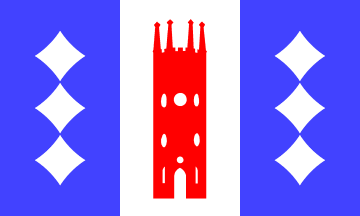
Panker

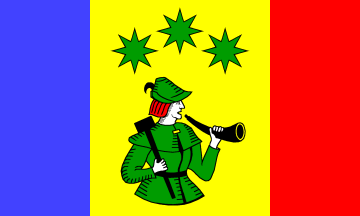
Panten

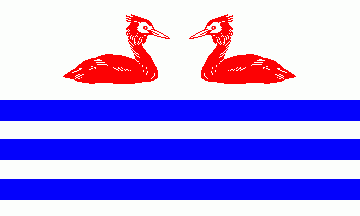
Passade

Pinneberg

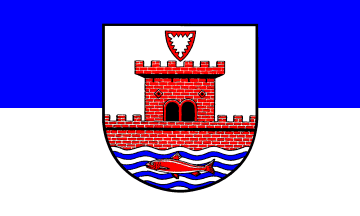
Plön

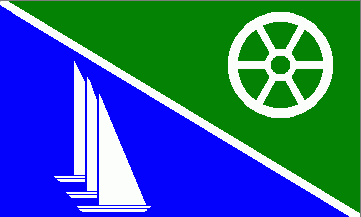
Pogeez

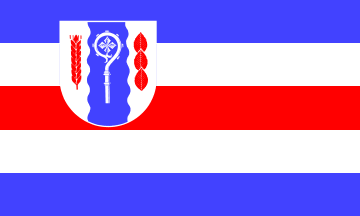
Pohnsdorf

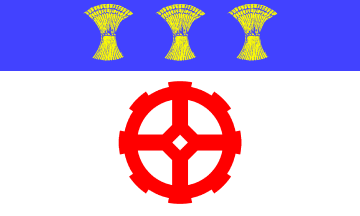
Postfeld

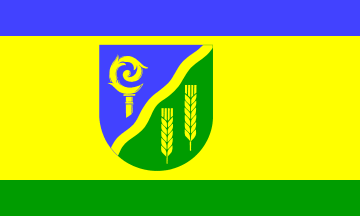
Prasdorf

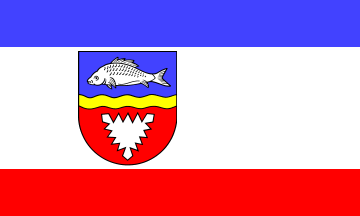
Preetz

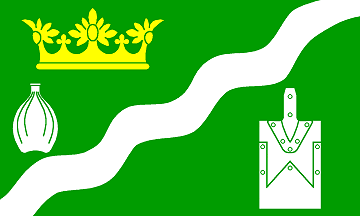
Prinzenmoor

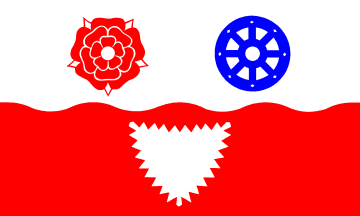
Prisdorf

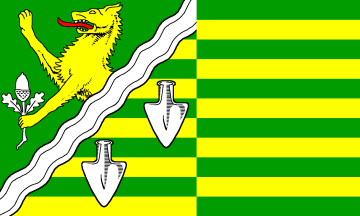
Probsteierhagen

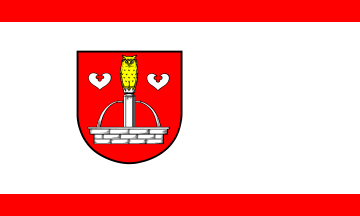
Quickborn (Pinneberg)

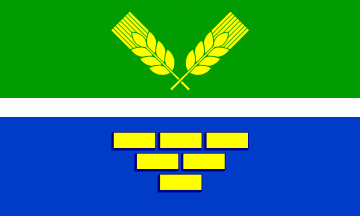
Rade bei Rendsburg

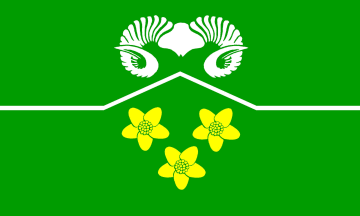
Ramstedt

Rantzau

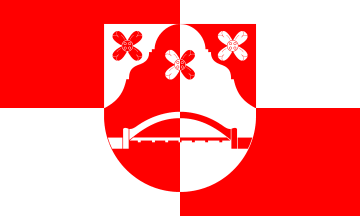
Rastorf

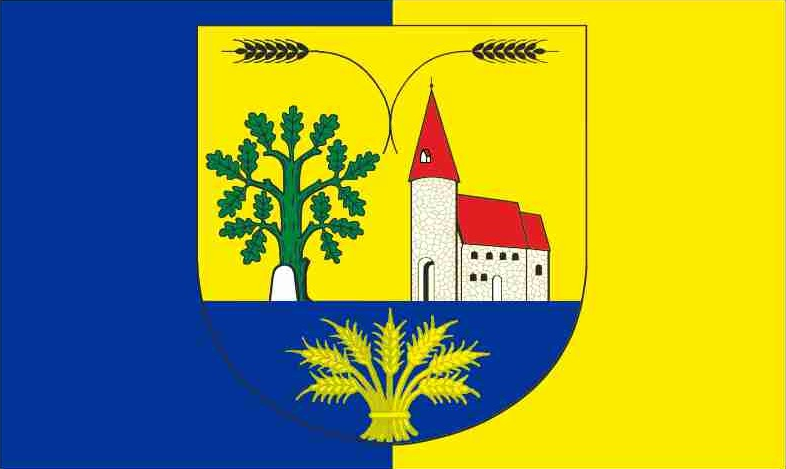
Ratekau

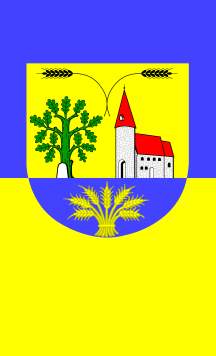
Ratekau (variant)

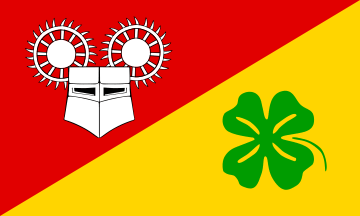
Rathjensdorf

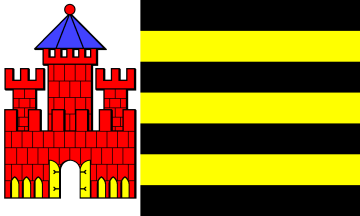
Ratzeburg

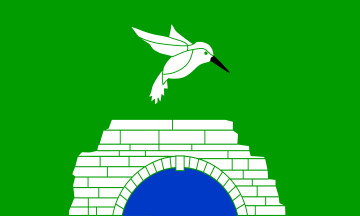
Reesdorf

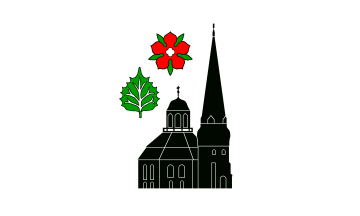
Rellingen

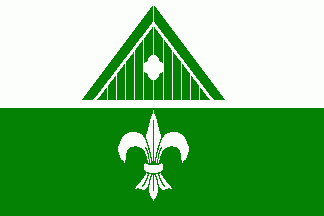
Rendswühren

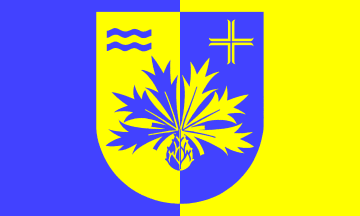
Riepsdorf

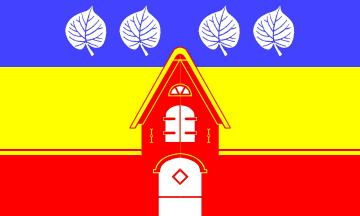
Risum-Lindholm

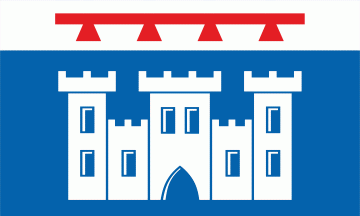
Ritzerau

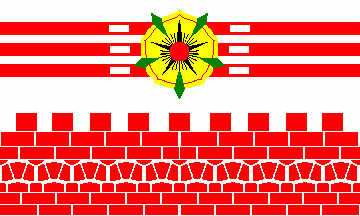
Roseburg

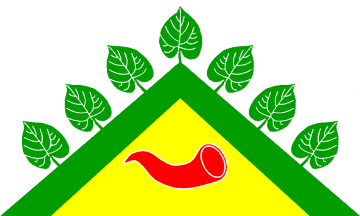
Ruhwinkel

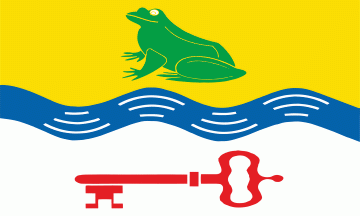
Sahms

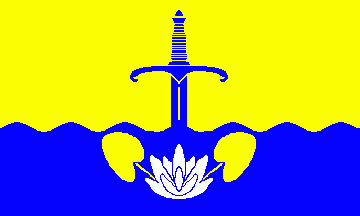
Salem

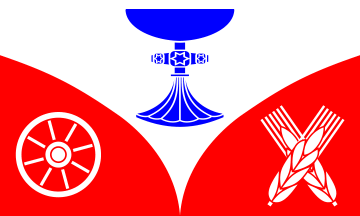
Sandesneben

Sankt Peter-Ording

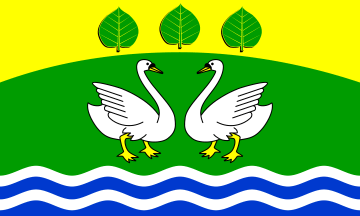
Sarzbüttel

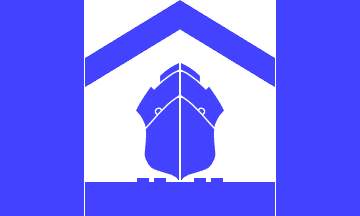
Schacht-Audorf

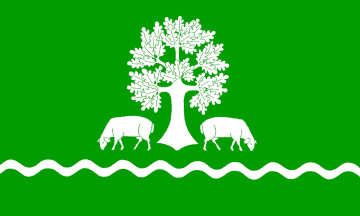
Schafstedt

Scharbeutz

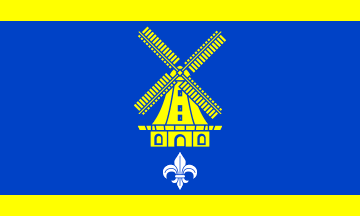
Schashagen

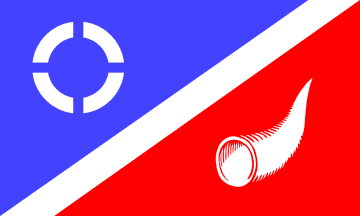
Schellhorn

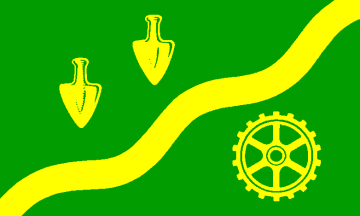
Schenefeld (Pinneberg)

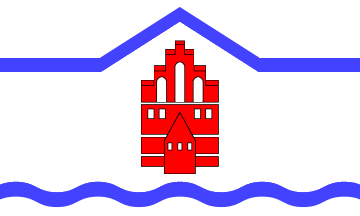
Schinkel

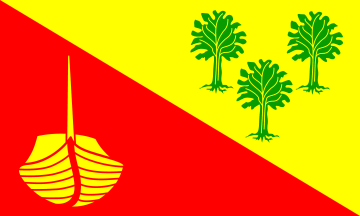
Schiphorst

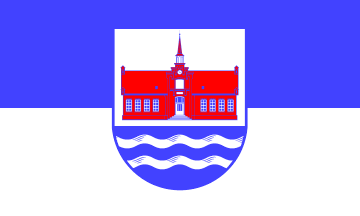
Schlesen

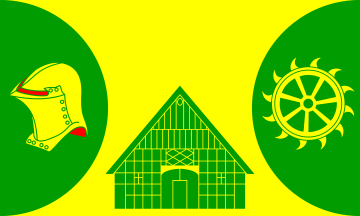
Schmalstede

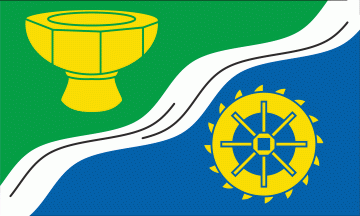
Schmilau

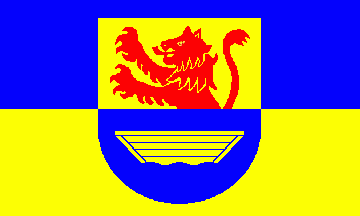
Schnakenbek

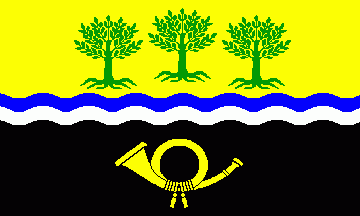
Schönberg (Lauenburg)

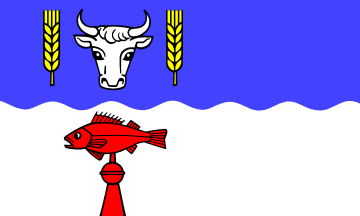
Schönberg (Plön)

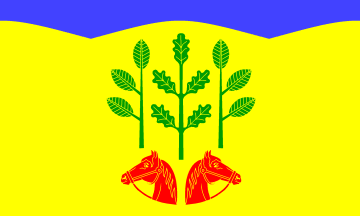
Schönhorst

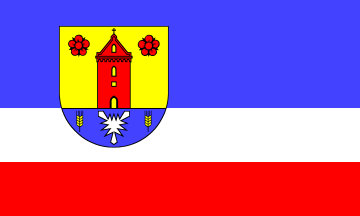
Schönkirchen

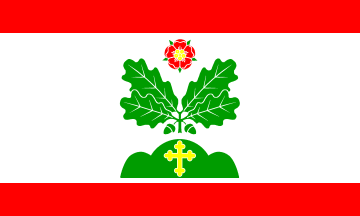
Schönwalde am Bungsberg

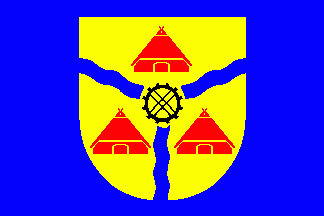
Schulendorf

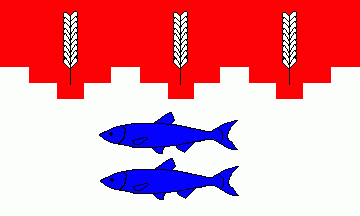
Schülldorf

Schülp bei Rendsburg

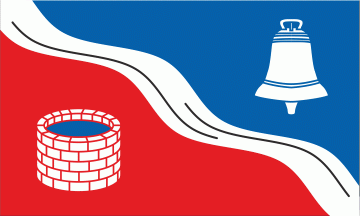
Schürensöhlen

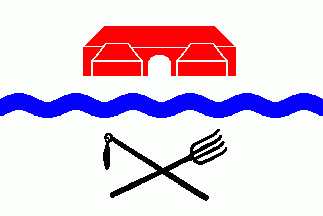
Schwartbuck

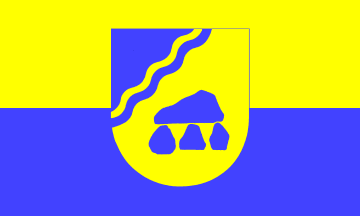
Schwedeneck

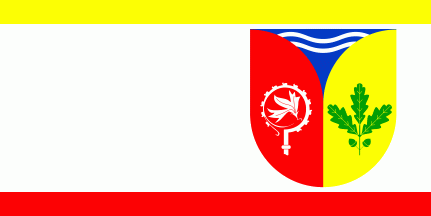
Schwentinental

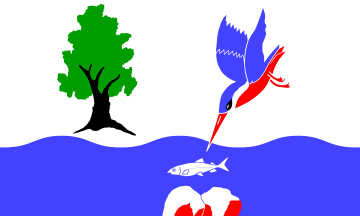
Seedorf (Lauenburg)

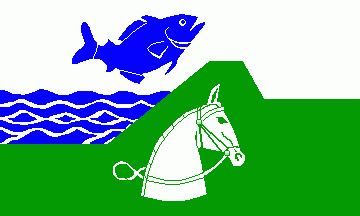
Seester

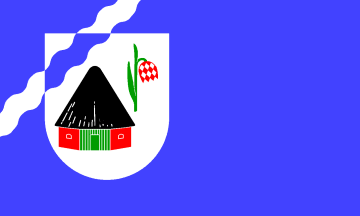
Seestermühe

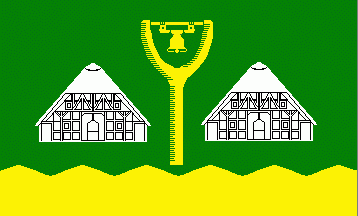
Seeth

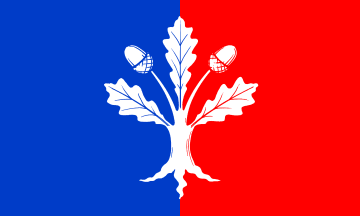
Seeth-Ekholt

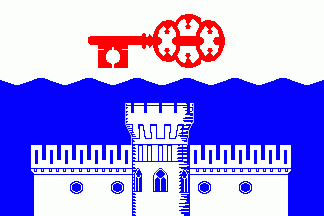
Selent

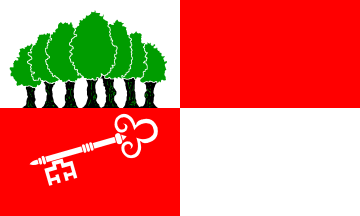
Siebenbäumen

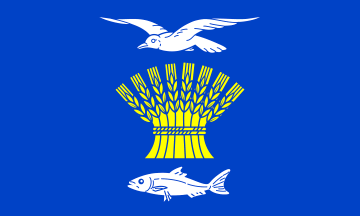
Sierksdorf

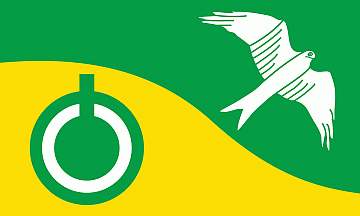
Sirksfelde

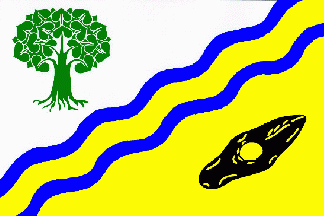
Sollwitt

Sommerland

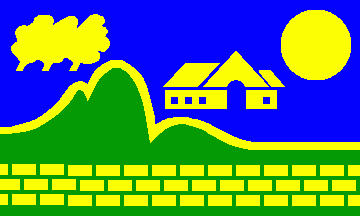
Sönnebüll

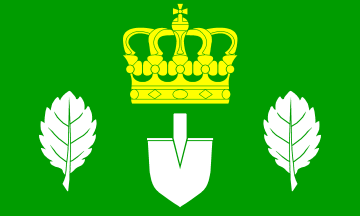
Sophienhamm

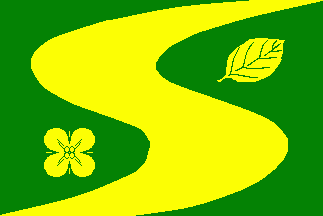
Sören

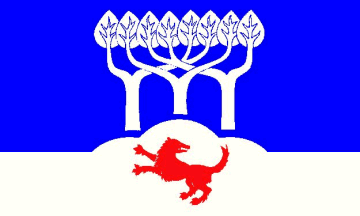
Stadum

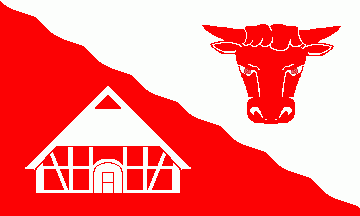
Stafstedt

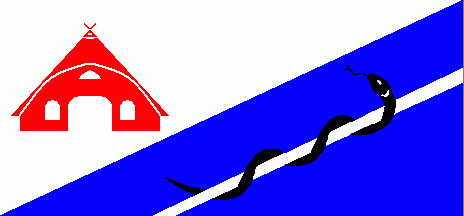
Stakendorf

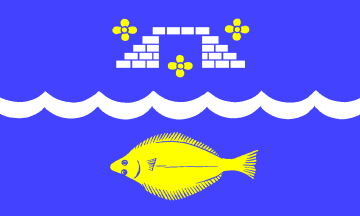
Stein

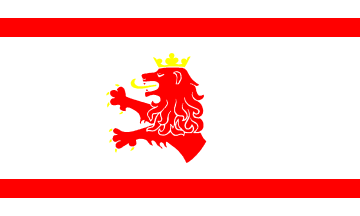
Steinhorst

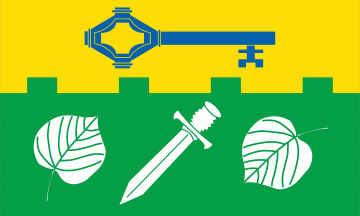
Sterley

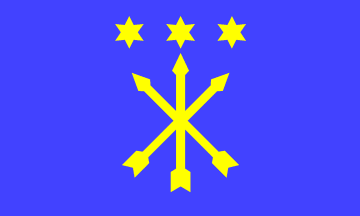
Stockelsdorf

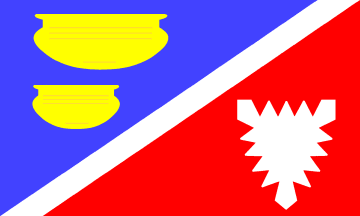
Stolpe

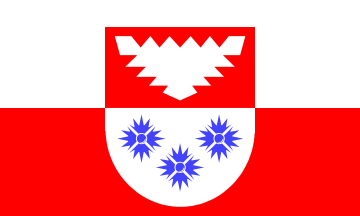
Stoltenberg

Strande

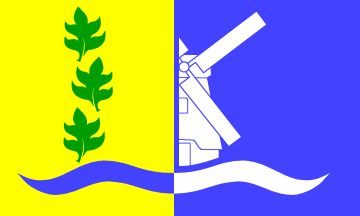
Struckum

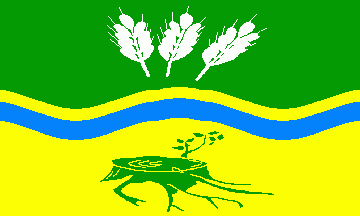
Stubben

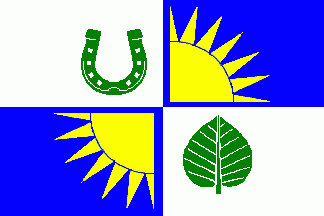
Süderdorf

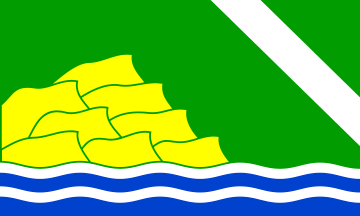
Süderlügum

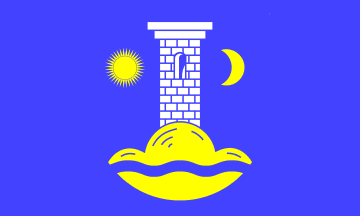
Süsel

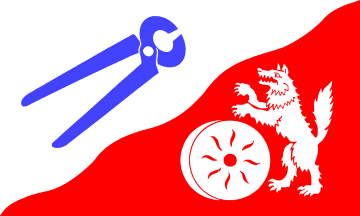
Tangstedt (Pinneberg)

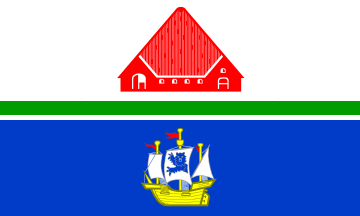
Tating

Timmendorfer Strand

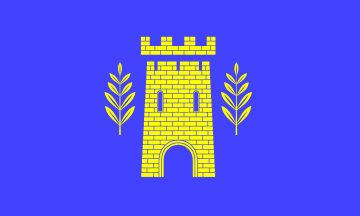
Tornesch

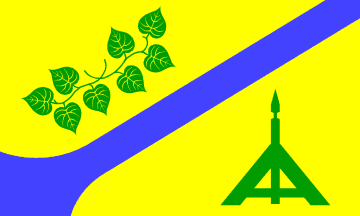
Tramm

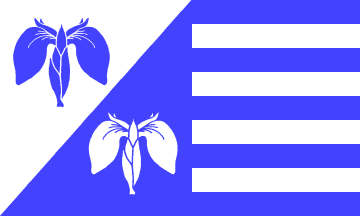
Tröndel

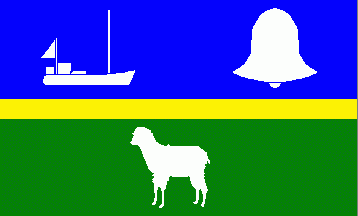
Tümlauer-Koog

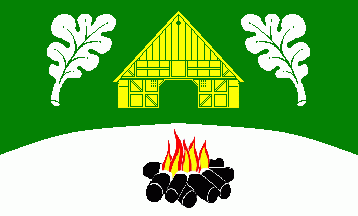
Tüttendorf

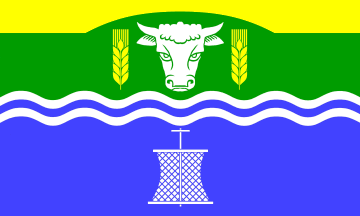
Uelvesbüll

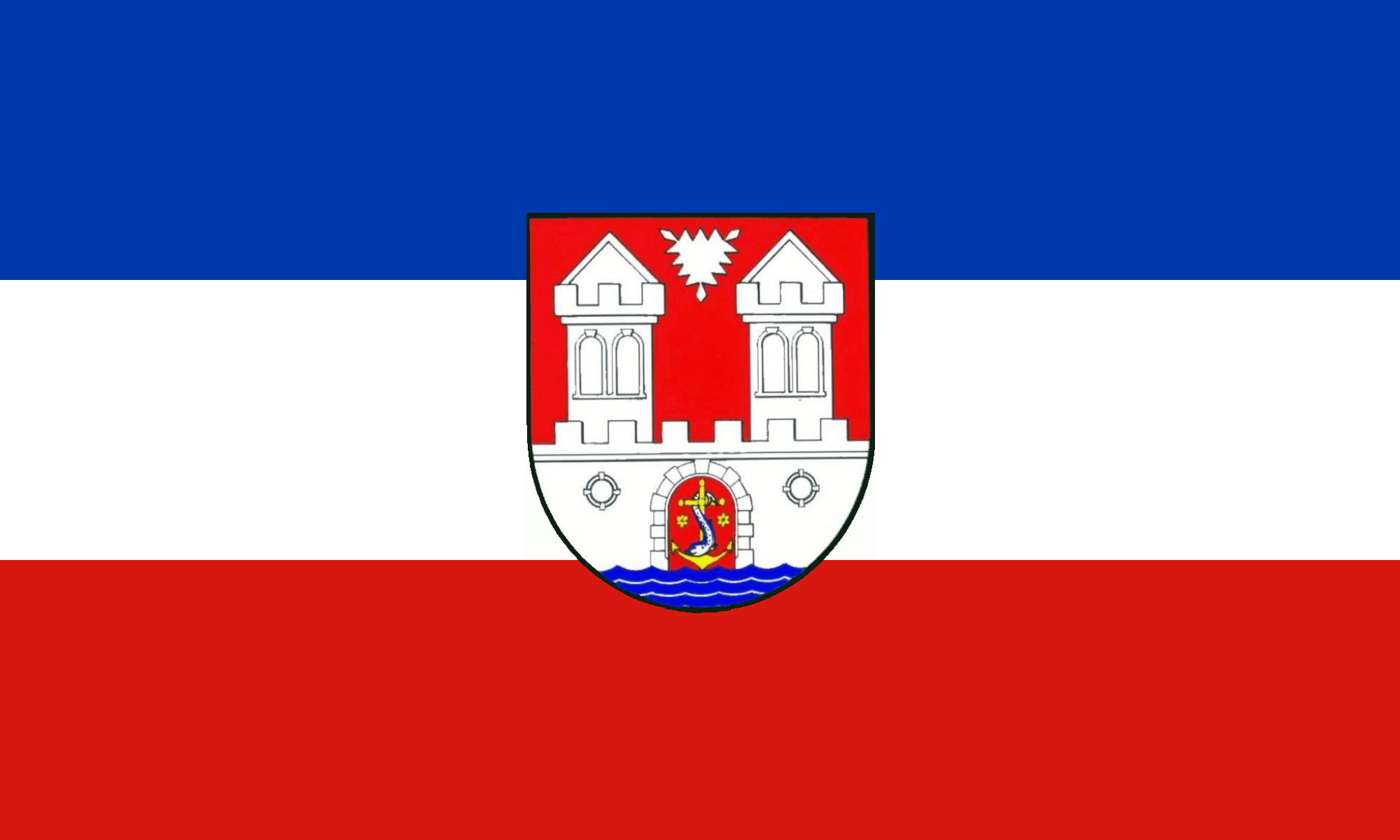
Uetersen

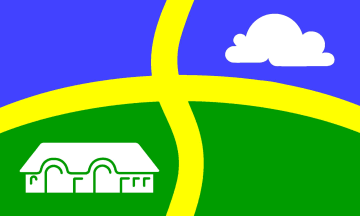
Vollstedt

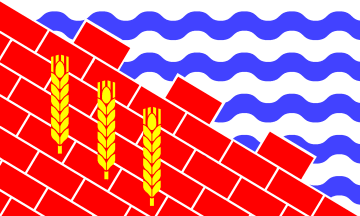
Wahlstorf

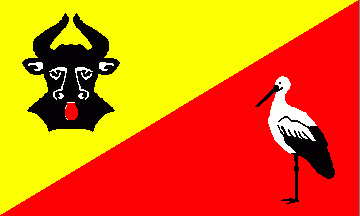
Walksfelde

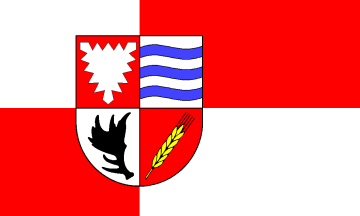
Wangels

Wankendorf

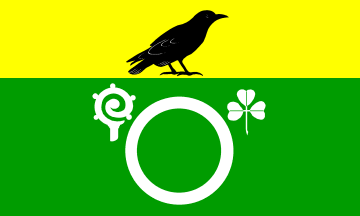
Warnau

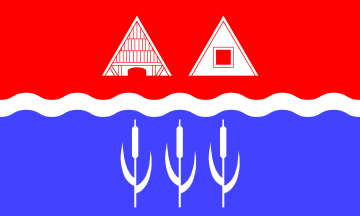
Wattenbek

Wedel

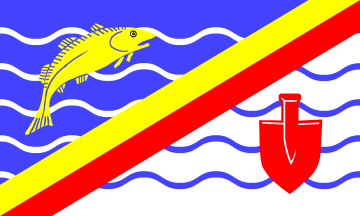
Wendtorf

Wenningstedt-Braderup

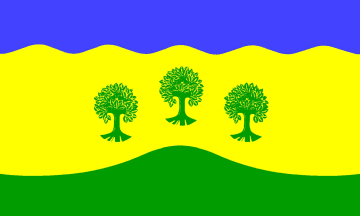
Wesseln

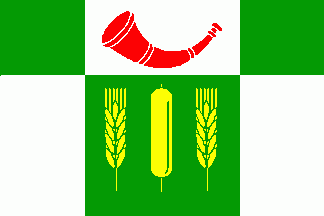
Westerhorn

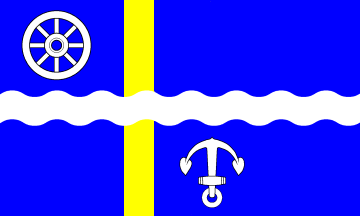
Westerrönfeld

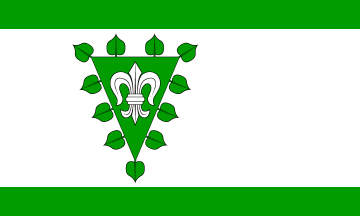
Wiershop

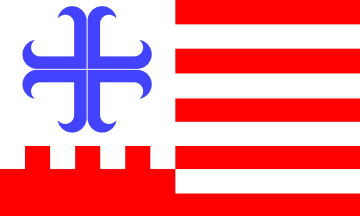
Windbergen

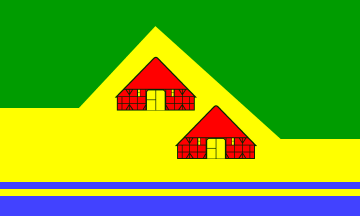
Winnert

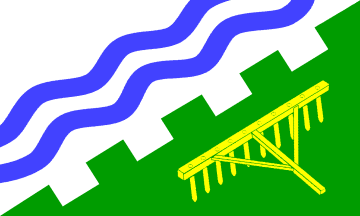
Wisch (Plön)

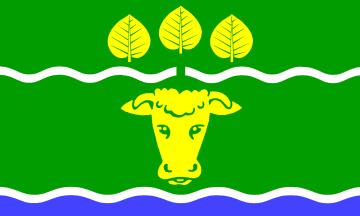
Wittbek

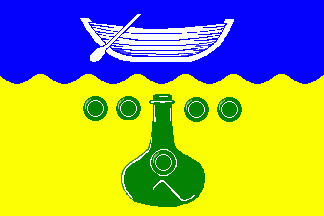
Wittmoldt

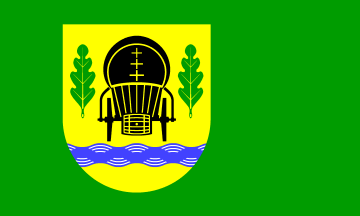
Witzeeze

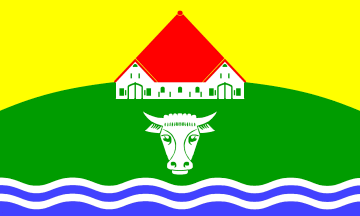
Witzwort

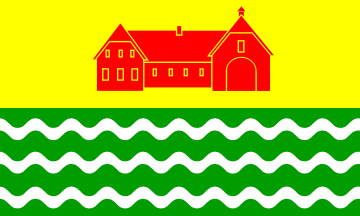
Wobbenbüll

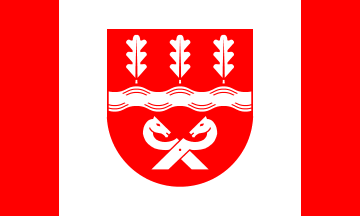
Wohltorf

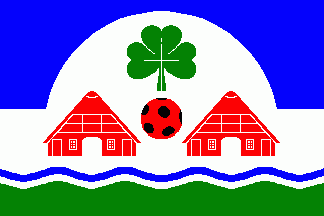
Wolmersdorf

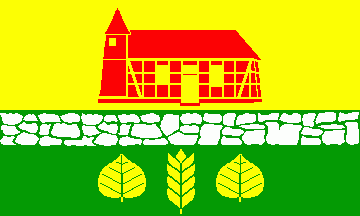
Worth

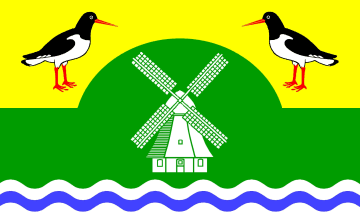
Wrixum

Wyk auf Föhr

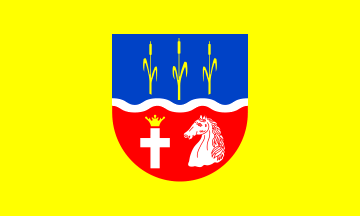
Ziethen

=== Historical ===
Albersdorf (Amt)

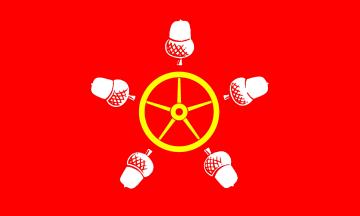
Aukrug (Amt; 1998–2012)

Bokhorst

Bökingharde

Bönningstedt (Amt)

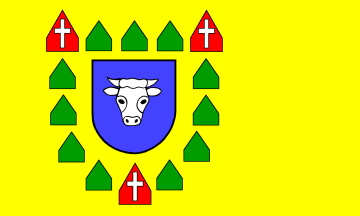
Bredstedt-Land (Amt; 2003–2008)

Burg-Süderhastedt

Föhr-Land

Friedrichstadt (Amt)

Hattstedt (Amt)

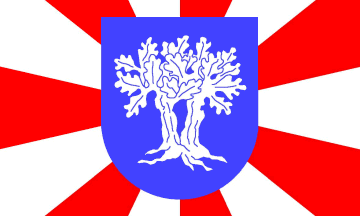
Hohenwestedt-Land (Amt; 1988–2012)

Karrharde

Lunden (Amt)

Meldorf-Land

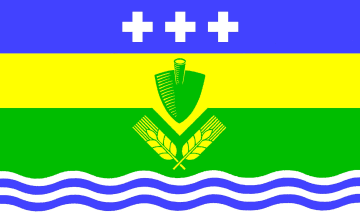
Nordstrand (Amt; 2005–2008)

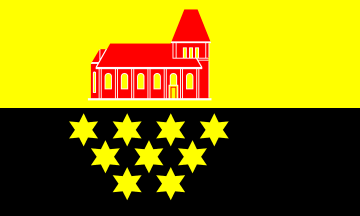
Nusse (Amt; 1999–2008)

Osterrönfeld (Amt; 2000–2008)

Pinneberg-Land

Sandesneben (Amt)

Stollberg (Amt)

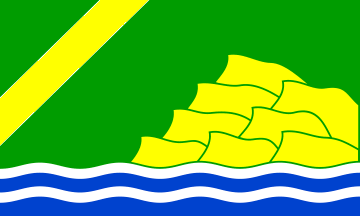
Süderlügum (Amt; 1991–2008)

Treene (Amt)

Wankendorf (Amt)

Weddingstedt (Amt)

Wiedingharde

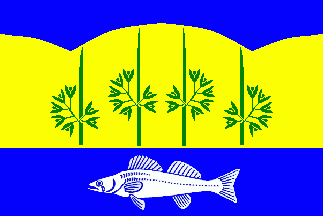
Bistensee (1998–2008)

Hägen

Heligoland (1807–1890)

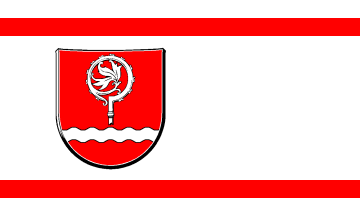
Klausdorf (1979–2008)

Lübeck (13th century; Hanseatic flag)

Lübeck (1903-1918)

Lübeck (sea flag; 1921-1935)

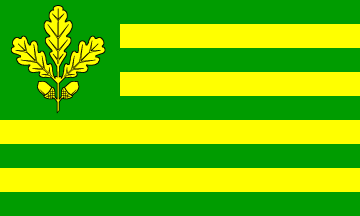
Raisdorf (1968–2007)

== Segeberg ==
=== Amt ===
Bad Bramstedt-Land

Boostedt-Rickling

Bornhöved

Itzstedt

Kaltenkirchen-Land

Kisdorf

Leezen

Trave-Land

=== Municipalities ===
Alveslohe

Armstedt

Bahrenhof

Bark

Bebensee

Bimöhlen

Blunk

Boostedt

Bornhöved

Borstel

Bühnsdorf

Daldorf

Damsdorf

Dreggers

Fahrenkrug

Föhrden-Barl

Fredesdorf

Fuhlendorf

Geschendorf

Glasau

Gönnebek

Großenaspe

Groß Kummerfeld

Groß Niendorf

Groß Rönnau

Hagen

Hardebek

Hartenholm

Hasenkrug

Hasenmoor

Heidmoor

Heidmühlen

Hitzhusen

Högersdorf

Hüttblek

Itzstedt

Kattendorf

Kayhude

Kisdorf

Klein Gladebrügge

Klein Rönnau

Krems II

Kükels

Latendorf

Leezen

Lentföhrden

Mönkloh

Mözen

Nahe

Negernbötel

Nehms

Neuengörs

Neversdorf

Nützen

Oering

Oersdorf

Pronstorf

Rickling

Rohlstorf

Schackendorf

Schieren

Schmalensee

Schmalfeld

Schwissel

Seedorf

Seth

Sievershütten

Stipsdorf

Stocksee

Strukdorf

Struvenhütten

Stuvenborn

Sülfeld

Tarbek

Tensfeld

Todesfelde

Trappenkamp

Travenhorst

Traventhal

Wakendorf I

Wakendorf II

Weddelbrook

Weede

Wensin

Westerrade

Wiemersdorf

Winsen

Wittenborn

== Steinburg ==
=== Amt ===
Breitenburg

Horst-Herzhorn

Itzehoe-Land

Kellinghusen

Krempermarsch

Schenefeld

Wilstermarsch

=== Municipalities ===
Aasbüttel

Aebtissinwisch

Agethorst

Altenmoor

Auufer

Bahrenfleth

Beidenfleth

Bekdorf

Bekmünde

Besdorf

Blomesche Wildnis

Bokelrehm

Bokhorst

Borsfleth

Breitenberg

Breitenburg

Brokdorf

Brokstedt

Büttel

Christinenthal

Dägeling

Dammfleth

Drage

Ecklak

Elskop

Engelbrechtsche Wildnis

Fitzbek

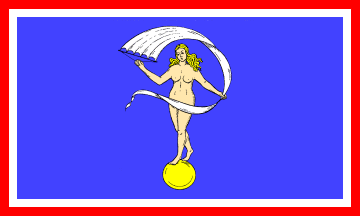
Glückstadt

Grevenkop

Gribbohm

Hadenfeld

Heiligenstedten

Heiligenstedtenerkamp

Hennstedt

Herzhorn

Hingstheide

Hodorf

Hohenaspe

Hohenfelde

Hohenlockstedt

Holstenniendorf

Horst

Huje

Itzehoe

Kaaks

Kaisborstel

Kellinghusen

Kiebitzreihe

Kleve

Kollmar

Kollmoor

Krempe

Kremperheide

Krempermoor

Krempdorf

Kronsmoor

Krummendiek

Kudensee

Lägerdorf

Landrecht

Landscheide

Lockstedt

Lohbarbek

Looft

Mehlbek

Moordiek

Moorhusen

Mühlenbarbek

Münsterdorf

Neuenbrook

Neuendorf bei Elmshorn

Neuendorf-Sachsenbande

Nienbüttel

Nortorf

Nutteln

Oelixdorf

Oeschebüttel

Oldenborstel

Oldendorf

Ottenbüttel

Peissen

Pöschendorf

Poyenberg

Puls

Quarnstedt

Rade

Reher

Rethwisch

Rosdorf

Sankt Margarethen

Sarlhusen

Schenefeld

Schlotfeld

Silzen

Sommerland

Stördorf

Störkathen

Süderau

Vaale

Vaalermoor

Wacken

Warringholz

Westermoor

Wewelsfleth

Wiedenborstel

Willenscharen

Wilster

Winseldorf

Wrist

Wittenbergen

Wulfsmoor

== Stormarn ==
=== Amt ===
Bad Oldesloe-Land

Bargteheide-Land

Nordstormarn

Siek

Trittau

=== Munincipalities ===
Ahrensburg

Ammersbek

Badendorf

Bad Oldesloe

Bargfeld-Stegen

Bargteheide

Barnitz

Barsbüttel

Braak

Brunsbek

Delingsdorf

Elmenhorst

Feldhorst

Glinde

Grabau

Grande

Grönwohld

Großensee

Großhansdorf

Hamberge

Hamfelde

Hammoor

Heidekamp

Heilshoop

Hohenfelde

Hoisdorf

Klein Wesenberg

Lasbek

Jersbek

Köthel

Lütjensee

Meddewade

Mönkhagen

Neritz

Nienwohld

Oststeinbek

Pölitz

Rausdorf

Rehhorst

Reinbek

Reinfeld

Rethwisch

Rümpel

Siek

Stapelfeld

Steinburg

Todendorf

Travenbrück

Tremsbüttel

Trittau

Wesenberg

Westerau

Witzhave

Zarpen
