= Bundesstraße 432 =

Federal highway in Germany

B 432
- Bundesstraße 432

Route information
- Length: 78 km (48 mi)

Location
- Country: Germany
- States: Hamburg, Schleswig-Holstein

Highway system
- Roads in Germany; Autobahns; List; Federal; List; State; E-roads

The Bundesstraße 432 is a federal road in Germany. It is located in southern Schleswig-Holstein between Hamburg and the Bay of Lübeck, which is part of the Baltic Sea.

== Route ==
The Bundesstraße 432 begins at the Schnelsen-Nord interchange of the Bundesautobahn 7 in the northwestern part of Hamburg and travels via Norderstedt, Kayhude, Nahe, Itzstedt, and Leezen to Bad Segeberg. In Bad Segeberg, the B 432 intersects with the B 206 as well as the A 21/B 404.

From Bad Segeberg, it continues between Warder and Wensin over the Wardersee, via Ahrensbök to Scharbeutz on the Baltic Sea. Shortly before Scharbeutz, the B 432 crosses the A 1 and from this interchange to Scharbeutz, it is concurrent with the B 76.

== History ==
The part between Schnelsen and Kayhude was built in 1840 as a part of the Chaussee between Hamburg and Lübeck, and the continuing road to Pönitz was part of the Altona-Neustädter Chaussee(the 2nd royal art street, built from 1842-1845). On this path, almost all historical Danish milestones are still there; these are under monument protection today. Shortly before Scharbeutz, between the A 1 and the railroad tracks, there are six explosive bays on the road as relics of the Cold War. In May 2006, the road was freshly paved, and the explosive bays were cleared out. The five pioneer lockers (explosive bunkers) are located near the Blocksberg (Pansdorf) and are now used as homes for bats.

== Expansion in Norderstedt ==
In Norderstedt, at the residential district of Ochsenzoll, the expansion for the so-called "Knoten Ochsenzoll" of the B 432 took place. The Ohechaussee was widened to four lanes between Ochsenzollerstraße and Ulzburger Straße (including turning lanes). This was followed by the widening of the Segeberger Chaussee to the crossroads of Schleswig-Holstein-Straße / Langenhorner Chaussee. In November 2013, a roundabout with a north-south tunnel underneath was completed to reduce the dust load of the area.

== Scenic routes ==
- Mözen – Bad Segeberg
- Klein Rönnau – Wensin

== See also ==
- List of federal highways in Germany
