= Sülfeld =

- Municipality
- Coat of arms

- Location of Sülfeld within Segeberg district
- Interactive map of Sülfeld
- Location within Germany Location within Schleswig-Holstein
- Coordinates: 53°47′N 10°13′E
- Country: Germany
- State: Schleswig-Holstein
- District: Segeberg
- Municipal assoc.: Itzstedt

Government
  - Mayor: Karl-Heinz Wegner (CDU)

Area
  - Total: 26.05 km^{2} (10.06 sq mi)
- Elevation: 31 m (102 ft)

Population (2025-12-31)
  - Total: 3,343
  - Density: 128.3/km^{2} (332.4/sq mi)
- Time zone: UTC+01:00 (CET)
  - Summer (DST): UTC+02:00 (CEST)
- Postal codes: 23867
- Dialling codes: 04537
- Vehicle registration: SE
- Website: www.amt-itzstedt.eu

Sülfeld is a municipality in the district of Segeberg, in Schleswig-Holstein, Germany.

== History ==
The church in Sülfeld was first mentioned in 1207. Remains of the Alster-Beste Canal, constructed in the first half of the 16th century, are still present in the village center today.

From 1907 to 1973, Sülfeld served as a railway station on the Elmshorn–Bad Oldesloe line.

== Politics ==
Municipal Council

In the local election on 14 May 2023, a total of 21 seats were allocated. The CDU received nine seats, the Action Citizens for the Municipality of Sülfeld (A.B.S.) six seats, and the Greens and the SPD three seats each.

Coat of Arms

Blazon: "Divided. Above in red a golden bell; below in silver a rising blue Anthony’s cross with wave-shaped curved bars, extending throughout."

The wavy blue bar symbolizes the Norderbeste River, while the vertical straight blue bar represents the artificial channel of the Alster-Beste Canal.

== Economy ==
The municipality is predominantly agricultural. However, the Borstel Research Center, which focuses on medicine and biosciences, holds a prominent position.

== Borstel Manor and Research Center ==
The Borstel estate district (Gutsbezirk Borstel), which included the villages of Grabau, Kayhude, Oering, Seth, and Sülfeld, as well as the later additions to the Jersbek estate—Bargfeld, Elmenhorst, Mönkenbrook, Nienwohld, Rade, Stegen, and Walksfelde—was dissolved in 1927. The estate was historically also known as Borlstede or Borstelde and was first mentioned in the mid-13th century. In 1588, the property was divided, separating the Jersbek estate (now part of the Stormarn district). In 1806, the Grabau estate also became independent.

The current Borstel manor house was built in 1751 in the Rococo style.

In 1930, the estate was converted into a children's convalescent home and subsequently had a varied history—serving as a training center for the female labor service under the Nazi regime and later as a reception camp for refugees after World War II. Since 1947, the Borstel estate has been the seat of the Forschungszentrum Borstel (Borstel Research Center), founded by the state of Schleswig-Holstein and converted into a foundation in 1963, along with its affiliated research clinic.
