= Krems II =

- Municipality
- Coat of arms

- Location of Krems II within Segeberg district
- Interactive map of Krems II
- Location within Germany Location within Schleswig-Holstein
- Coordinates: 53°59′N 10°21′E
- Country: Germany
- State: Schleswig-Holstein
- District: Segeberg
- Municipal assoc.: Trave-Land

Government
  - Mayor: Hans-Heinrich Jaacks

Area
  - Total: 11.23 km^{2} (4.34 sq mi)
- Elevation: 29 m (95 ft)

Population (2025-12-31)
  - Total: 378
  - Density: 33.7/km^{2} (87.2/sq mi)
- Time zone: UTC+01:00 (CET)
  - Summer (DST): UTC+02:00 (CEST)
- Postal codes: 23827
- Dialling codes: 04559 (östl. Wardersee), 04557 (westl. Wardersee)
- Vehicle registration: SE
- Website: www.amt-trave- land.de

Krems II is a municipality in the district of Segeberg, in Schleswig-Holstein, Germany. The Roman numeral II in the municipality's name served to distinguish it from the nearby Krems I, which is now part of Leezen.

== Geography and nearby roads ==
Krems II lies 7 km northeast of Bad Segeberg on the Wardersee. South of the municipality runs the Bundesstraße 432 from Bad Segeberg to Scharbeutz, and to the west runs the Bundesautobahn 21 from Bargteheide to Kiel.
