= Rickling =

Rickling may refer to the following places:

- Rickling, Essex, England, including Rickling Green
- Rickling, Germany, a municipality in the district of Segeberg, in Schleswig-Holstein, Germany.
  - Rickling (Amt)
