= Wakendorf II =

- Municipality
- Coat of arms

- Location of Wakendorf II within Segeberg district
- Interactive map of Wakendorf II
- Location within Germany Location within Schleswig-Holstein
- Coordinates: 53°47′N 10°5′E
- Country: Germany
- State: Schleswig-Holstein
- District: Segeberg
- Municipal assoc.: Kisdorf

Government
  - Mayor: Hans-Hermann Schütt

Area
  - Total: 12.8 km^{2} (4.9 sq mi)
- Elevation: 30 m (98 ft)

Population (2025-12-31)
  - Total: 1,351
  - Density: 106/km^{2} (273/sq mi)
- Time zone: UTC+01:00 (CET)
  - Summer (DST): UTC+02:00 (CEST)
- Postal codes: 24558
- Dialling codes: 04535
- Vehicle registration: SE
- Website: www.wakendorf2.de

Wakendorf II is a municipality in the district of Segeberg, in Schleswig-Holstein, Germany.

== Name ==
The name "Wakendorf II" was instituted in Prussian times to distinguish it from a different town about 20 km away, also called Wakendorf. The distinct name of these two towns is purely for communal distinction, and has no historical background.

A citizens' initiative attempted to rename the village in Wakendorf an der Alster through a signing action. This request was not considered admissible by the local authority of Segeberg, as formal guidelines such as the date of birth of the signatories in the signature list were not listed.

On June 22, 2006, the municipal council decided to retain the name Wakendorf II.

== Geography and transport ==
Wakendorf II lies between Henstedt-Ulzburg and Nahe. There are also streets to Tangstedt and Kisdorf. Wakendorf II lies 20 km southwest of its partner town Wakendorf I.

Until 1973, Wakendorf II had a locomotive depot (Bahnbetriebswerk) and a train station on the Kleinbahn Elmshorn-Barmstedt-Oldesloe railway. In the 1960s, there was a direct bus connection via Tangstedt and Glashütte to the Ochsenzoll U-Bahn station in northern Hamburg. Today, Wakendorf II's only public transport connection is the VHH regional bus line 7141 between Henstedt-Ulzburg and Bad Oldesloe via Nahe and Itzstedt.
