= Wakendorf =

Wakendorf may refer to:

- Wakendorf I, a German municipality in the district of Segeberg, in Schleswig-Holstein.
- Wakendorf II, a German municipality in the district of Segeberg, in Schleswig-Holstein.
