= Reinhard Brandt =

German philosopher (1937–2025)

Reinhard Brandt (10 April 1937 – 17 August 2025) was a German philosopher.

== Life and career ==
Brandt was born in Klein Gladebrügge on 10 April 1937. He studied Greek, Latin and philosophy in Marburg, Munich and Paris. In 1965 he completed his doctorate on the Aristotelian theory of judgement. His unpublished habilitation was on David Hume's theoretical philosophy.

From 1972, Brandt was a professor of history of philosophy at the University of Marburg. He retired in 2003. He also taught at several other universities.

His research focus was the philosophy of Immanuel Kant. He published several articles on Kant in Italian.

Brandt died in Marburg on 17 August 2025, at the age of 88.
