= Ernst Barkmann =

German tank commander (1919–2009)

- Born: 25 August 1919; Kisdorf
- Died: 27 June 2009 (aged 89)
- Military career
- Allegiance: Nazi Germany
- Branch: Waffen-SS
- Service years: 1936–1945
- Rank: SS-Oberscharführer
- Conflicts: World War II
- Awards: Knight's Cross of the Iron Cross

Ernst Barkmann (25 August 1919 – 27 June 2009) was a German tank commander in the Waffen-SS of Nazi Germany during World War II. He is known for the actions undertaken at “Barkmann’s Corner", in which his unit halted a U.S. Army armoured advance in Normandy on 27 July 1944, for which he received the Knight's Cross of the Iron Cross.

== SS career ==
Barkmann joined the Nazi Party on 1 September 1938 and served in the Reich Labour Service from November 1938 to March 1939. After this he joined the SS on 1 April 1939, and served during the occupation of Poland. He was posted for a time as an instructor of SS volunteers in the Netherlands. In winter 1942/43 he was posted to the SS Division Das Reich on the Eastern Front, with which he took part in the Third Battle of Kharkov.

In February 1944, Das Reich was ordered to France to form a part of the 5th Panzer Army, the armoured reserve for the expected Allied invasion. Following Operation Overlord, the Allied invasion of June 1944, the division reached the front in early July and fought against the American forces near Saint-Lô. Barkmann was awarded the Knight's Cross of the Iron Cross. Barkmann participated in the Ardennes Offensive in December 1944 and the fighting on the Eastern Front in the spring of 1945.

Barkmann and his crew were credited with the destruction of at least 82 Soviet, British and US tanks, 136 miscellaneous armoured fighting vehicles and 43 anti-tank guns, but Barkmann's reputed actions in Normandy were challenged by the military historian Steven Zaloga, who asserts that he analysed the Allied war records, and was unable to locate the losses claimed by Barkmann. He attributed the narrative of Barkmann's Corner to the "propaganda efforts of the Waffen-SS".

== Awards and decorations ==
- 1939 Wound Badge
  - in Black, 1939
  - in Silver and Gold
- 1939 Iron Cross
  - 2nd Class (14 July 1941)
  - 1st Class (1 August 1944)
- Infantry Assault Badge in Silver, 18 February 1942
- Knight's Cross of the Iron Cross on 27 August 1944 as SS-Unterscharführer and panzer commander in the 4./SS-Panzer-Regiment 2 "Das Reich" (Note: According to Scherzer as panzer commander in the 4./SS-Panzer-Regiment 2.)
- Panzer Badge second and third Class

== See also ==
- Waffen-SS in popular culture
- Panzer ace
