= Itzstedt =

- Municipality
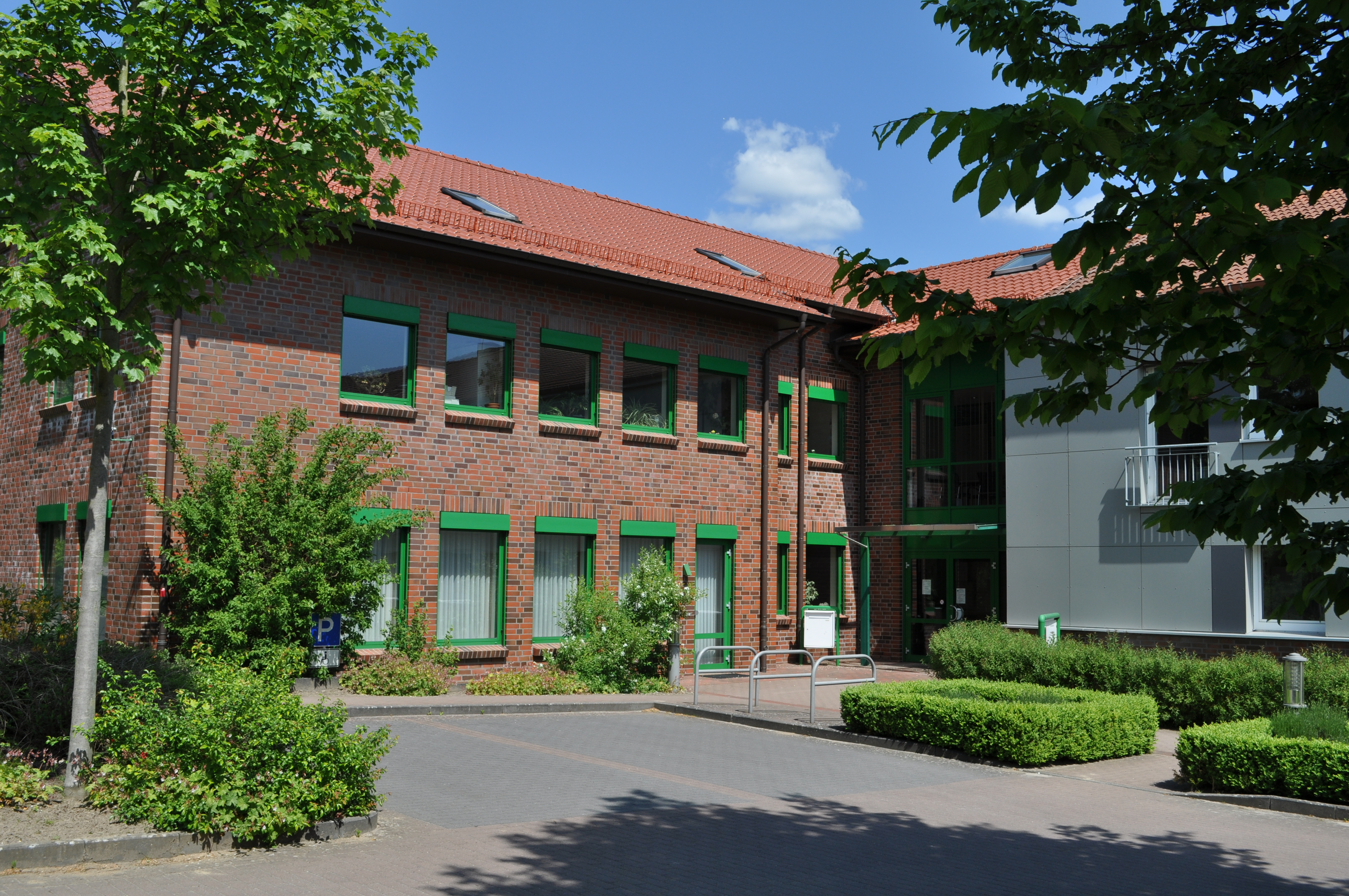
- Municipal office

- Coat of arms

- Location of Itzstedt within Segeberg district
- Interactive map of Itzstedt
- Location within Germany Location within Schleswig-Holstein
- Coordinates: 53°48′30″N 10°9′30″E
- Country: Germany
- State: Schleswig-Holstein
- District: Segeberg
- Municipal assoc.: Itzstedt

Government
  - Mayor: Helmut Thran (SPD)

Area
  - Total: 7.13 km^{2} (2.75 sq mi)
- Elevation: 27 m (89 ft)

Population (2025-12-31)
  - Total: 2,533
  - Density: 355/km^{2} (920/sq mi)
- Time zone: UTC+01:00 (CET)
  - Summer (DST): UTC+02:00 (CEST)
- Postal codes: 23845
- Dialling codes: 04535
- Vehicle registration: SE
- Website: www.itzstedt.de

Itzstedt is a municipality in the district of Segeberg, in Schleswig-Holstein, Germany. It is situated approximately 32 km northeast of Hamburg, and 17 km southwest of Bad Segeberg.

Itzstedt is the seat of the Amt ("collective municipality") Itzstedt.

In the 1980s English footballer Kevin Keegan lived in the village during his time playing for Hamburger SV.

== Geography and transport ==
Itzstedt lies about 16 kilometers northeast of Norderstedt on the Bundesstraße 432, which is the road that runs between Hamburg and Bad Segeberg.

The regional bus line 7550 runs hourly along the Bundesstraße 432 from the Ochsenzoll subway station to the Bad Segeberg train station. During the main traffic hours (in the morning hours towards Hamburg, in the afternoon towards Bad Segeberg) the bus runs every 30 minutes. On Sunday, the bus runs two-hourly.

In addition to this, another bus line, line 7141, travels through Itzstedt along the Bundesstraße 432 from Henstedt-Ulzburg to Bad Oldesloe.

Until the 1970s, the Elmshorn-Barmstedt-Oldesloe railway had a station in northern Nahe, about 1 km away from Itzstedt.
