= Bahrenhof =

- Municipality
- Location of Bahrenhof within Segeberg district
- Interactive map of Bahrenhof
- Location within Germany Location within Schleswig-Holstein
- Coordinates: 53°53′N 10°23′E
- Country: Germany
- State: Schleswig-Holstein
- District: Segeberg
- Municipal assoc.: Trave-Land

Government
  - Mayor: Hans-Peter Ulverich

Area
  - Total: 5.71 km^{2} (2.20 sq mi)
- Elevation: 53 m (174 ft)

Population (2025-12-31)
  - Total: 214
  - Density: 37.5/km^{2} (97.1/sq mi)
- Time zone: UTC+01:00 (CET)
  - Summer (DST): UTC+02:00 (CEST)
- Postal codes: 23845
- Dialling codes: 04550
- Vehicle registration: SE
- Website: www.amt-trave- land.de

Bahrenhof is a municipality in the district of Segeberg in Schleswig-Holstein, Germany.
