= Stipsdorf =

- Municipality
- Coat of arms

- Location of Stipsdorf within Segeberg district
- Interactive map of Stipsdorf
- Location within Germany Location within Schleswig-Holstein
- Coordinates: 53°57′N 10°20′E
- Country: Germany
- State: Schleswig-Holstein
- District: Segeberg
- Municipal assoc.: Trave-Land

Government
  - Mayor: Stefan Kresse

Area
  - Total: 3.51 km^{2} (1.36 sq mi)
- Elevation: 31 m (102 ft)

Population (2025-12-31)
  - Total: 233
  - Density: 66.4/km^{2} (172/sq mi)
- Time zone: UTC+01:00 (CET)
  - Summer (DST): UTC+02:00 (CEST)
- Postal codes: 23795
- Dialling codes: 04551
- Vehicle registration: SE
- Website: www.amt-trave- land.de

Stipsdorf is a municipality in the district of Segeberg, in Schleswig-Holstein, Germany.
