= Hasenkrug =

- Municipality
- Coat of arms

- Location of Hasenkrug within Segeberg district
- Interactive map of Hasenkrug
- Location within Germany Location within Schleswig-Holstein
- Coordinates: 53°59′14″N 9°51′3″E
- Country: Germany
- State: Schleswig-Holstein
- District: Segeberg
- Municipal assoc.: Bad Bramstedt-Land

Government
  - Mayor: Bernd Aszmoneit

Area
  - Total: 5.2 km^{2} (2.0 sq mi)
- Elevation: 11 m (36 ft)

Population (2025-12-31)
  - Total: 387
  - Density: 74/km^{2} (190/sq mi)
- Time zone: UTC+01:00 (CET)
  - Summer (DST): UTC+02:00 (CEST)
- Postal codes: 24616
- Dialling codes: 04324
- Vehicle registration: SE
- Website: www.amt-bad- bramstedt-land.de

Hasenkrug is a municipality in the district of Segeberg, in Schleswig-Holstein, Germany.
