= Wardersee =

Lake in Schleswig-Holstein, Germany

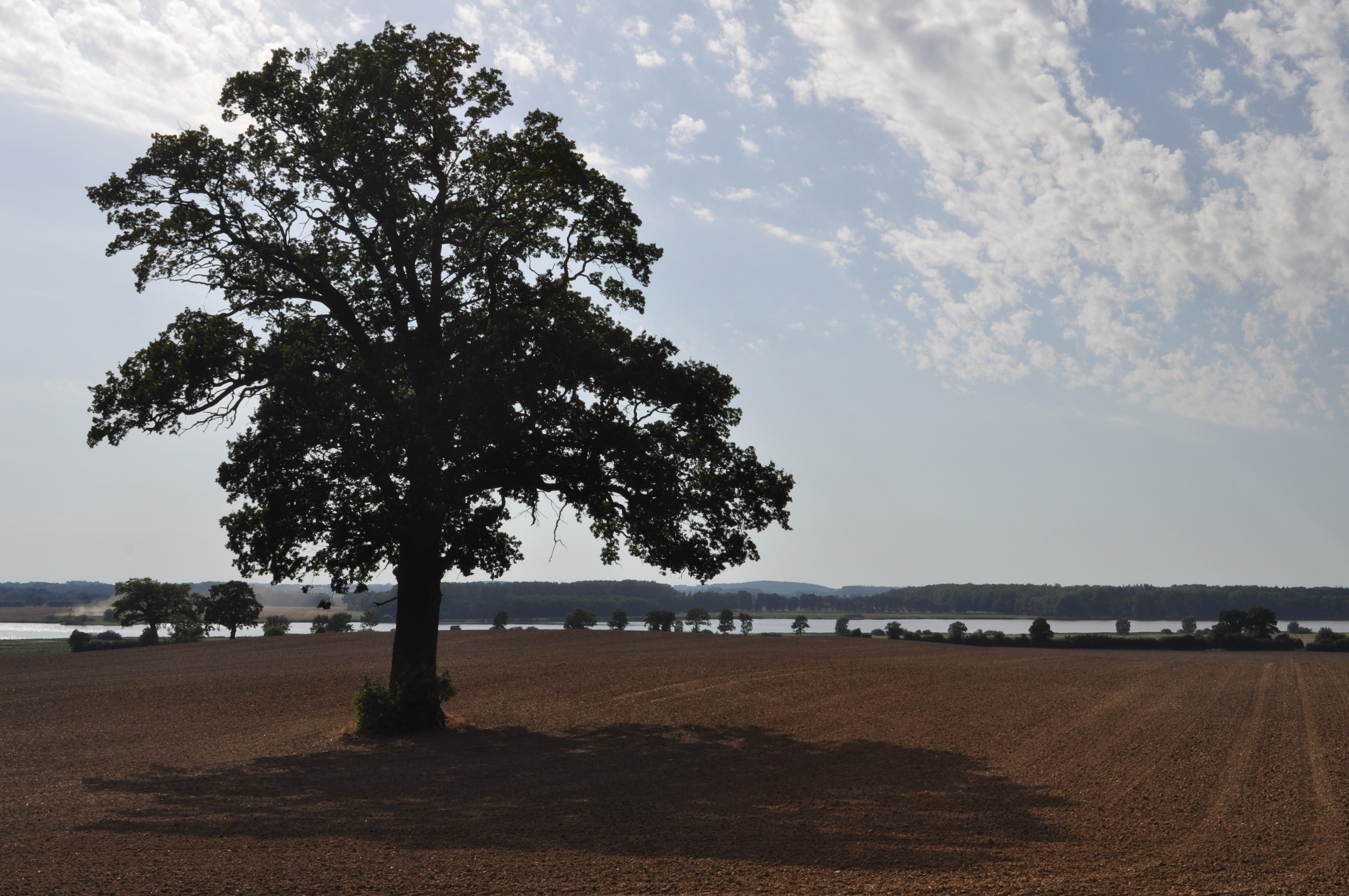
- View from near Pronstorf to the Wardersee.

- Location within Schleswig-Holstein
- Location: Kreis Segeberg, Schleswig-Holstein
- Coordinates: 53°58′32″N 10°25′10″E
- Primary inflows: Trave, Bißnitz
- Primary outflows: Trave
- Basin countries: Germany
- Surface area: 3.6 km^{2} (1.4 sq mi)
- Max. depth: 10.8 m (35 ft)

Wardersee is a lake in Kreis Segeberg, Schleswig-Holstein, Germany. At its elevation, its surface area is 3.6 km².

The federal highway 432 crosses the lake in a west-east direction near the village of Warder.
