= Bark, Germany =

Bark
- Municipality
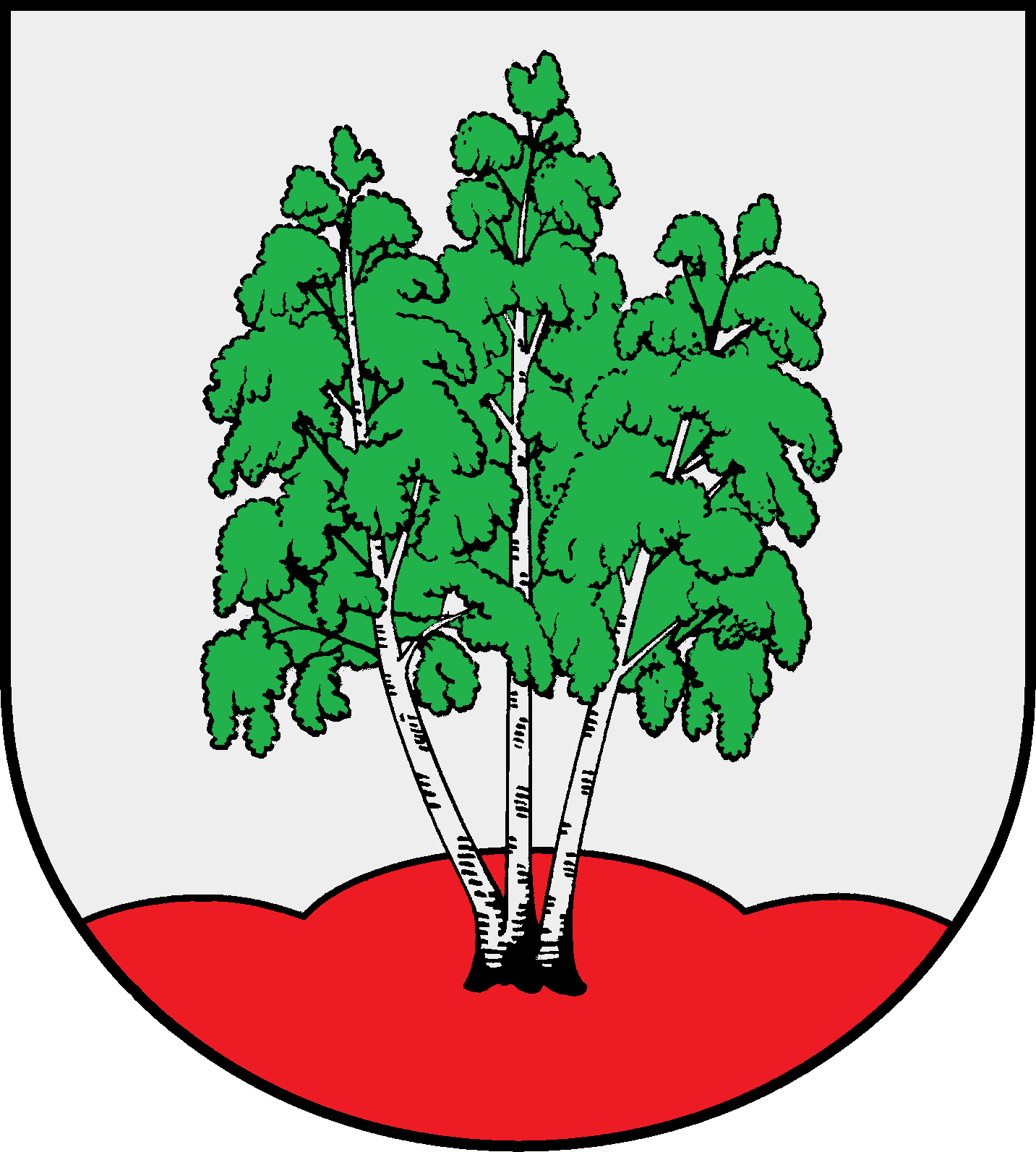
- Coat of arms

- Location of Bark within Segeberg district
- Interactive map of Bark
- Location within Germany Location within Schleswig-Holstein
- Coordinates: 53°55′N 10°11′E
- Country: Germany
- State: Schleswig-Holstein
- District: Segeberg
- Municipal assoc.: Leezen

Government
  - Mayor: Hartmut Faber

Area
  - Total: 20.44 km^{2} (7.89 sq mi)
- Elevation: 38 m (125 ft)

Population (2025-12-31)
  - Total: 1,067
  - Density: 52.20/km^{2} (135.2/sq mi)
- Time zone: UTC+01:00 (CET)
  - Summer (DST): UTC+02:00 (CEST)
- Postal codes: 23826
- Dialling codes: 04558
- Vehicle registration: SE
- Website: gemeinde-bark.de

Bark is a municipality in the district of Segeberg, in Schleswig-Holstein, Germany.
