= Sievershütten =

- Municipality
- Coat of arms

- Location of Sievershütten within Segeberg district
- Interactive map of Sievershütten
- Location within Germany Location within Schleswig-Holstein
- Coordinates: 53°50′35″N 10°6′28″E
- Country: Germany
- State: Schleswig-Holstein
- District: Segeberg
- Municipal assoc.: Kisdorf

Government
  - Mayor: Stefan Weber (SPD)

Area
  - Total: 7.09 km^{2} (2.74 sq mi)
- Elevation: 29 m (95 ft)

Population (2025-12-31)
  - Total: 1,079
  - Density: 152/km^{2} (394/sq mi)
- Time zone: UTC+01:00 (CET)
  - Summer (DST): UTC+02:00 (CEST)
- Postal codes: 24641
- Dialling codes: 04194
- Vehicle registration: SE
- Website: www.amt-kisdorf.de

Sievershütten is a municipality in the district of Segeberg, in Schleswig-Holstein, Germany.

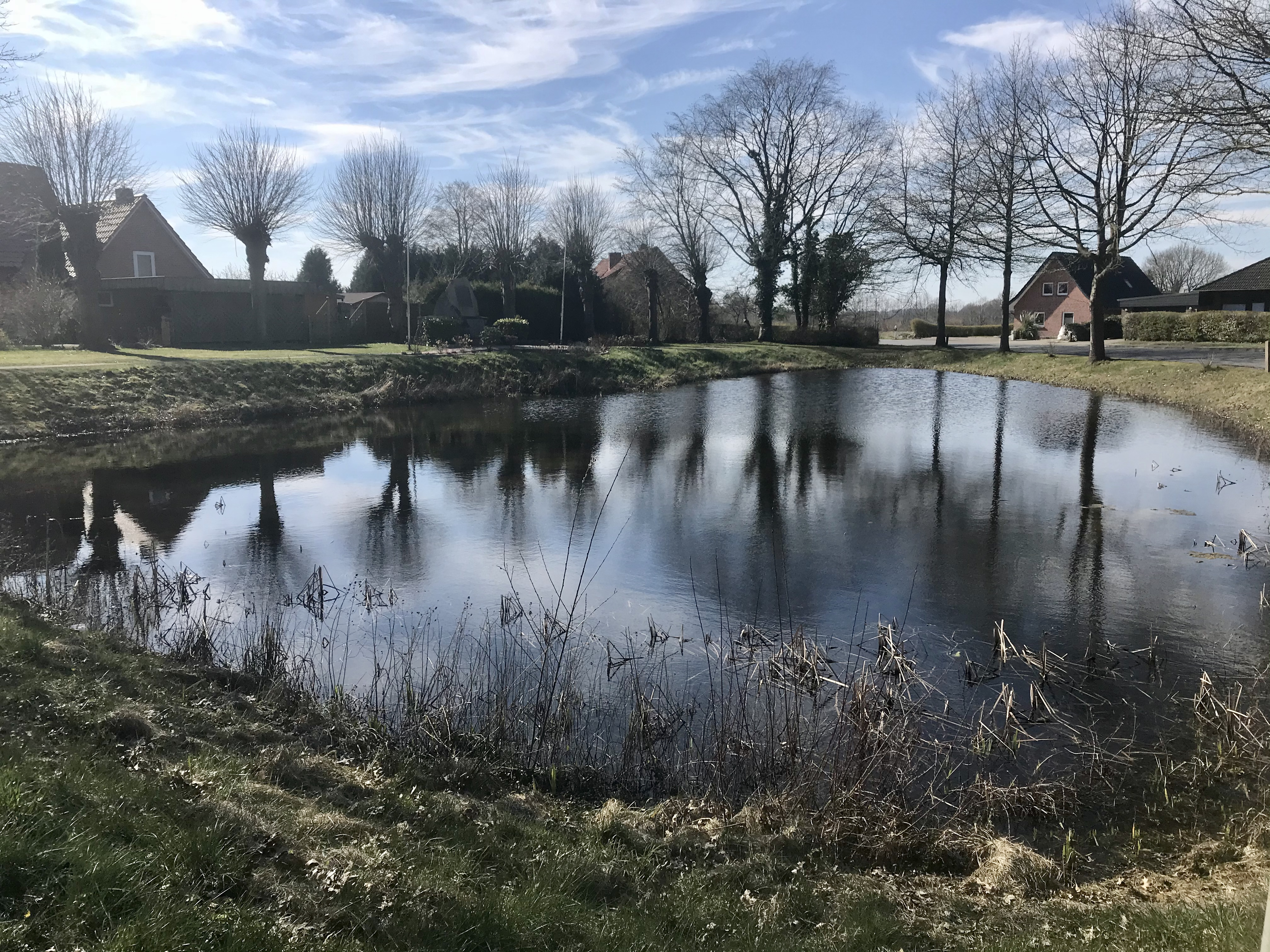
Pond at west side of Sievershütten

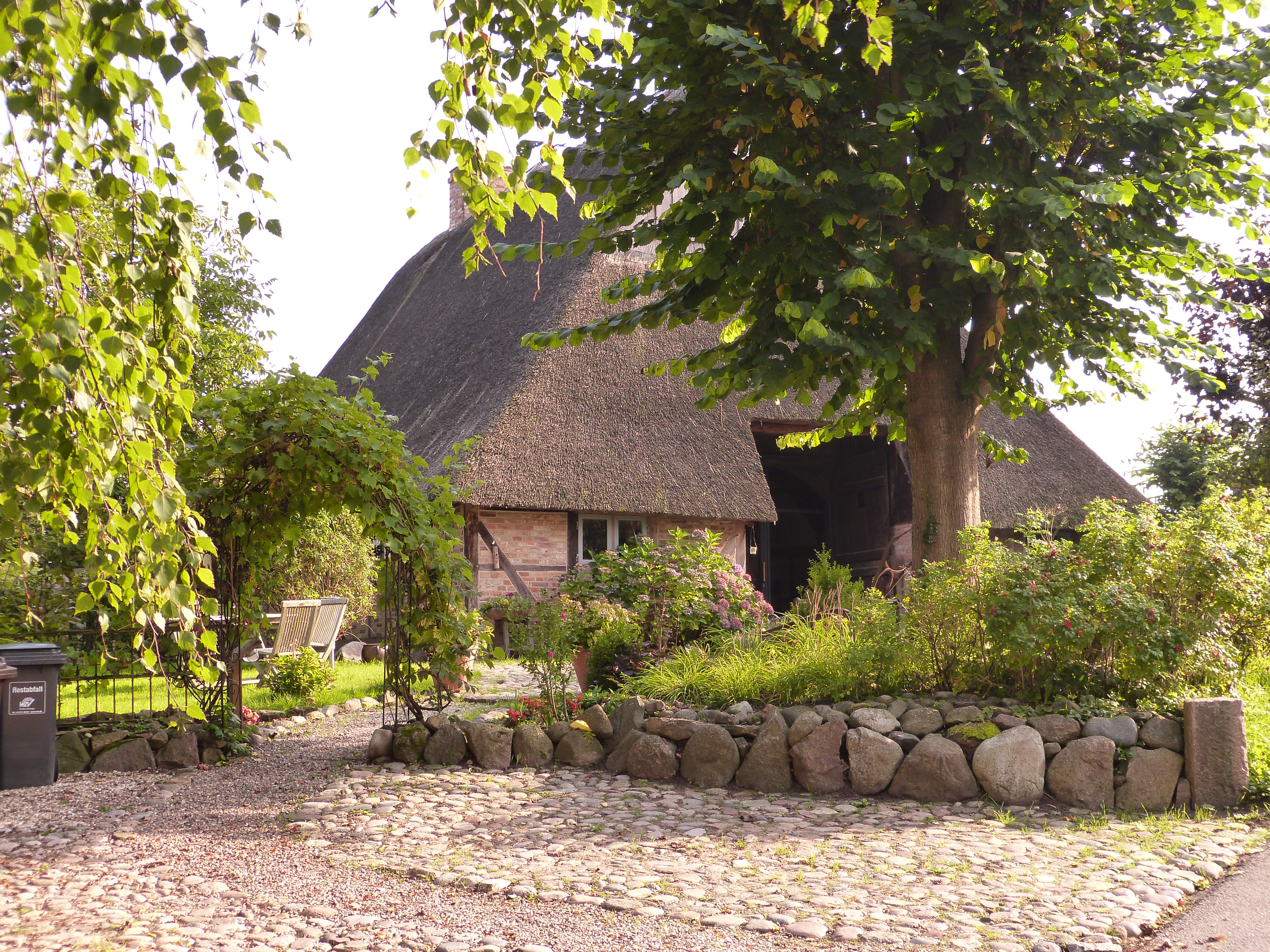
Cultural heritage monument
