= Hardebek =

- Municipality
- Coat of arms

- Location of Hardebek within Segeberg district
- Interactive map of Hardebek
- Location within Germany Location within Schleswig-Holstein
- Coordinates: 53°58′N 9°52′E
- Country: Germany
- State: Schleswig-Holstein
- District: Segeberg
- Municipal assoc.: Bad Bramstedt-Land

Government
  - Mayor (2018–23): Wolfgang Wilczek

Area
  - Total: 10.01 km^{2} (3.86 sq mi)
- Elevation: 17 m (56 ft)

Population (2025-12-31)
  - Total: 482
  - Density: 48.2/km^{2} (125/sq mi)
- Time zone: UTC+01:00 (CET)
  - Summer (DST): UTC+02:00 (CEST)
- Postal codes: 24616
- Dialling codes: 04324
- Vehicle registration: SE
- Website: www.amt-bad-bramstedt-land.de

Hardebek is a municipality in the district of Segeberg, in Schleswig-Holstein, Germany. As of 2021, the mayor is Wolfgang Wilczek, in office since 2018. It has 466 inhabitants, which is a population density of 46.6 people/km^{2} (121 people/mi^{2}).

It has three nuclear power stations nearby:

1. Brokdorf Nuclear Power Plant (37,6 km),
2. Brunsbüttel Nuclear Power Plant (45 km), and
3. Krümmel Nuclear Power Plant (73,5 km).
