= Heidmoor =

- Municipality
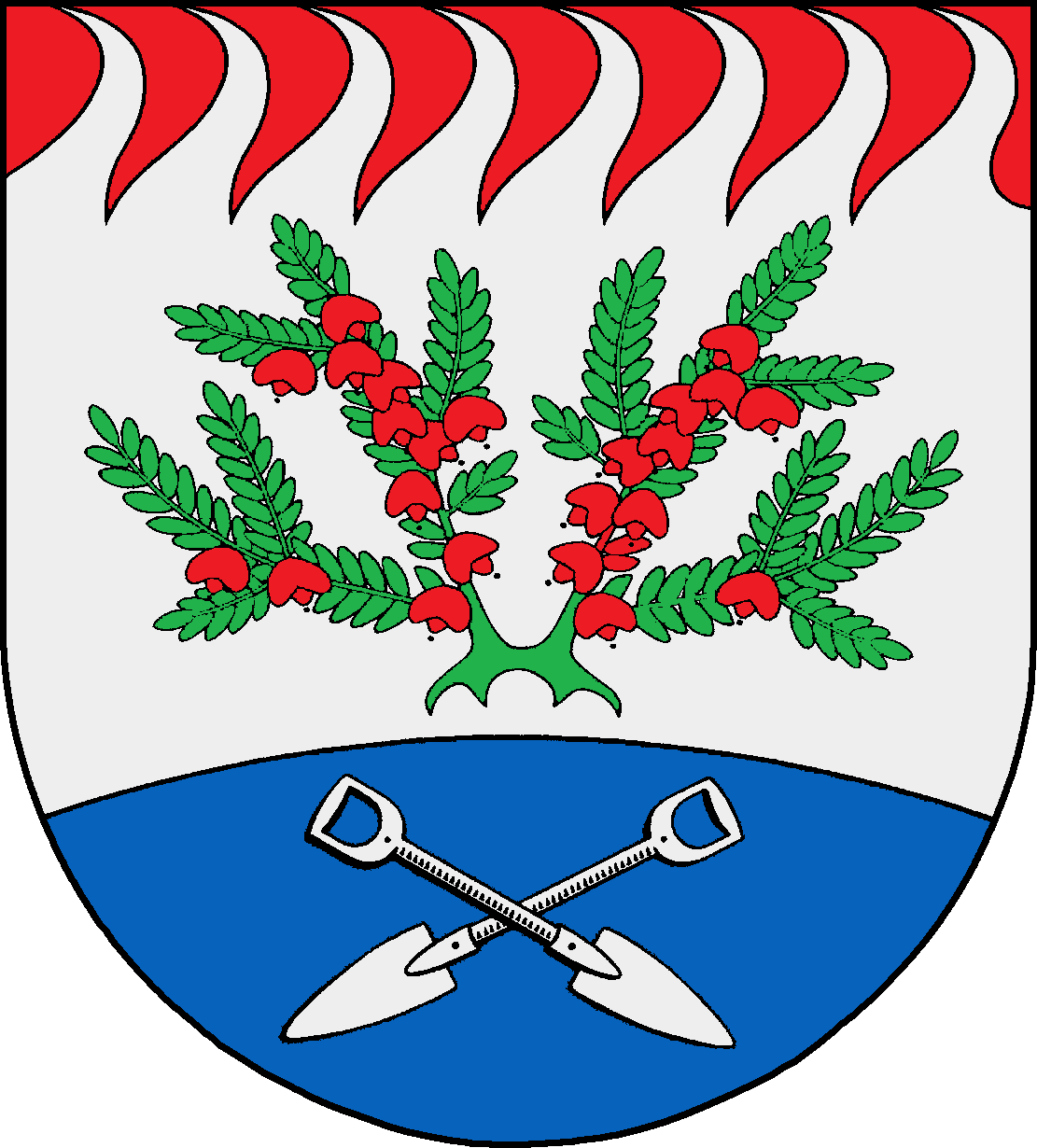
- Coat of arms

- Location of Heidmoor within Segeberg district
- Interactive map of Heidmoor
- Location within Germany Location within Schleswig-Holstein
- Coordinates: 53°50′N 9°51′E
- Country: Germany
- State: Schleswig-Holstein
- District: Segeberg
- Municipal assoc.: Bad Bramstedt-Land

Government
  - Mayor: Karl Menken

Area
  - Total: 18.25 km^{2} (7.05 sq mi)
- Elevation: 23 m (75 ft)

Population (2025-12-31)
  - Total: 331
  - Density: 18.1/km^{2} (47.0/sq mi)
- Time zone: UTC+01:00 (CET)
  - Summer (DST): UTC+02:00 (CEST)
- Postal codes: 24632
- Dialling codes: 04192
- Vehicle registration: SE
- Website: www.amt-bad-bramstedt-land.de

Heidmoor is a municipality in the district of Segeberg, in Schleswig-Holstein, Germany.
