= Lentföhrden =

- Municipality
- Coat of arms

- Location of Lentföhrden within Segeberg district
- Interactive map of Lentföhrden
- Location within Germany Location within Schleswig-Holstein
- Coordinates: 53°52′N 9°53′E
- Country: Germany
- State: Schleswig-Holstein
- District: Segeberg
- Municipal assoc.: Auenland Südholstein

Government
  - Mayor: Kurt Sander (CDU)

Area
  - Total: 20.07 km^{2} (7.75 sq mi)
- Elevation: 23 m (75 ft)

Population (2025-12-31)
  - Total: 2,550
  - Density: 127/km^{2} (329/sq mi)
- Time zone: UTC+01:00 (CET)
  - Summer (DST): UTC+02:00 (CEST)
- Postal codes: 24632
- Dialling codes: 04191, 04192
- Vehicle registration: SE
- Website: www.kaltenkirchen-land.de

Lentföhrden is a municipality in the district of Segeberg, in Schleswig-Holstein, Germany.
