= Bimöhlen =

- Municipality
- Coat of arms

- Location of Bimöhlen within Segeberg district
- Interactive map of Bimöhlen
- Location within Germany Location within Schleswig-Holstein
- Coordinates: 53°56′N 09°57′E
- Country: Germany
- State: Schleswig-Holstein
- District: Segeberg
- Municipal assoc.: Bad Bramstedt-Land

Government
  - Mayor: Michael Schirrmacher

Area
  - Total: 17.23 km^{2} (6.65 sq mi)
- Elevation: 16 m (52 ft)

Population (2025-12-31)
  - Total: 1,061
  - Density: 61.58/km^{2} (159.5/sq mi)
- Time zone: UTC+01:00 (CET)
  - Summer (DST): UTC+02:00 (CEST)
- Postal codes: 24576
- Dialling codes: 04192
- Vehicle registration: SE
- Website: www.amt-bad- bramstedt-land.de

Bimöhlen is a municipality in the district of Segeberg, in Schleswig-Holstein, Germany.
