= Groß Kummerfeld =

- Municipality
- Coat of arms

- Location of Groß Kummerfeld within Segeberg district
- Interactive map of Groß Kummerfeld
- Location within Germany Location within Schleswig-Holstein
- Coordinates: 54°3′10″N 10°5′25″E
- Country: Germany
- State: Schleswig-Holstein
- District: Segeberg
- Municipal assoc.: Boostedt-Rickling

Government
  - Mayor: Wilhelm Möllhoff (FW)

Area
  - Total: 30.18 km^{2} (11.65 sq mi)
- Elevation: 32 m (105 ft)

Population (2025-12-31)
  - Total: 1,920
  - Density: 63.6/km^{2} (165/sq mi)
- Time zone: UTC+01:00 (CET)
  - Summer (DST): UTC+02:00 (CEST)
- Postal codes: 24626
- Dialling codes: 04393
- Vehicle registration: SE
- Website: www.amt-rickling.de

Groß Kummerfeld is a municipality in the Kreis (district) of Segeberg in Schleswig-Holstein, north Germany.
