= Rohlstorf =

- Municipality
- Coat of arms

- Location of Rohlstorf within Segeberg district
- Interactive map of Rohlstorf
- Location within Germany Location within Schleswig-Holstein
- Coordinates: 53°58′10″N 10°24′30″E
- Country: Germany
- State: Schleswig-Holstein
- District: Segeberg
- Municipal assoc.: Trave-Land

Government
  - Mayor: Tim Breckwoldt (CDU)

Area
  - Total: 19.68 km^{2} (7.60 sq mi)
- Elevation: 34 m (112 ft)

Population (2025-12-31)
  - Total: 1,179
  - Density: 59.91/km^{2} (155.2/sq mi)
- Time zone: UTC+01:00 (CET)
  - Summer (DST): UTC+02:00 (CEST)
- Postal codes: 23821
- Dialling codes: 04553, 04559
- Vehicle registration: SE
- Website: www.amt-trave- land.de

Rohlstorf is a municipality in the district of Segeberg, in Schleswig-Holstein, Germany.
