= Fredesdorf =

- Municipality
- Coat of arms

- Location of Fredesdorf within Segeberg district
- Interactive map of Fredesdorf
- Location within Germany Location within Schleswig-Holstein
- Coordinates: 53°53′N 10°12′E
- Country: Germany
- State: Schleswig-Holstein
- District: Segeberg
- Municipal assoc.: Leezen

Government
  - Mayor: Peter Waldheuer

Area
  - Total: 5.89 km^{2} (2.27 sq mi)
- Elevation: 41 m (135 ft)

Population (2025-12-31)
  - Total: 391
  - Density: 66.4/km^{2} (172/sq mi)
- Time zone: UTC+01:00 (CET)
  - Summer (DST): UTC+02:00 (CEST)
- Postal codes: 23826
- Dialling codes: 04558
- Vehicle registration: SE
- Website: www.amt-leezen.de

Fredesdorf is a municipality in the district of Segeberg, in Schleswig-Holstein, Germany.
