= Nützen =

- Municipality
- Coat of arms

- Location of Nützen within Segeberg district
- Interactive map of Nützen
- Location within Germany Location within Schleswig-Holstein
- Coordinates: 53°52′N 9°55′E
- Country: Germany
- State: Schleswig-Holstein
- District: Segeberg
- Municipal assoc.: Auenland Südholstein

Government
  - Mayor: Klaus Brakel

Area
  - Total: 21.62 km^{2} (8.35 sq mi)
- Elevation: 23 m (75 ft)

Population (2025-12-31)
  - Total: 1,283
  - Density: 59.34/km^{2} (153.7/sq mi)
- Time zone: UTC+01:00 (CET)
  - Summer (DST): UTC+02:00 (CEST)
- Postal codes: 24568
- Dialling codes: 04191
- Vehicle registration: SE
- Website: www.kaltenkirchen- land.de

Nützen is a municipality in the district of Segeberg, in Schleswig-Holstein, Germany. Two areas, Kampen and Springhirsch, are within its jurisdiction.

== Geography and transport ==
Nützen lies about 7 km south of Bad Bramstedt, between the Bundesstraße 4 from Hamburg to Neumünster and the Bundesautobahn 7, which also goes from Hamburg to Neumünster. Kampen was originally a farm and Springhirsch lies directly on the Bundesstraße 4.
