= Alveslohe =

- Municipality
- Flag Coat of arms

- Location of Alveslohe within Segeberg district
- Interactive map of Alveslohe
- Location within Germany Location within Schleswig-Holstein
- Coordinates: 53°46′N 9°55′E
- Country: Germany
- State: Schleswig-Holstein
- District: Segeberg
- Municipal assoc.: Auenland Südholstein

Government
  - Mayor: Peter Kroll

Area
  - Total: 21.56 km^{2} (8.32 sq mi)
- Elevation: 28 m (92 ft)

Population (2025-12-31)
  - Total: 2,914
  - Density: 135.2/km^{2} (350.1/sq mi)
- Time zone: UTC+01:00 (CET)
  - Summer (DST): UTC+02:00 (CEST)
- Postal codes: 25486
- Dialling codes: 04191, 04193
- Vehicle registration: SE
- Website: www.kaltenkirchen-land.de

Alveslohe is a municipality in the district of Segeberg, in Schleswig-Holstein, Germany.

== Gallery ==
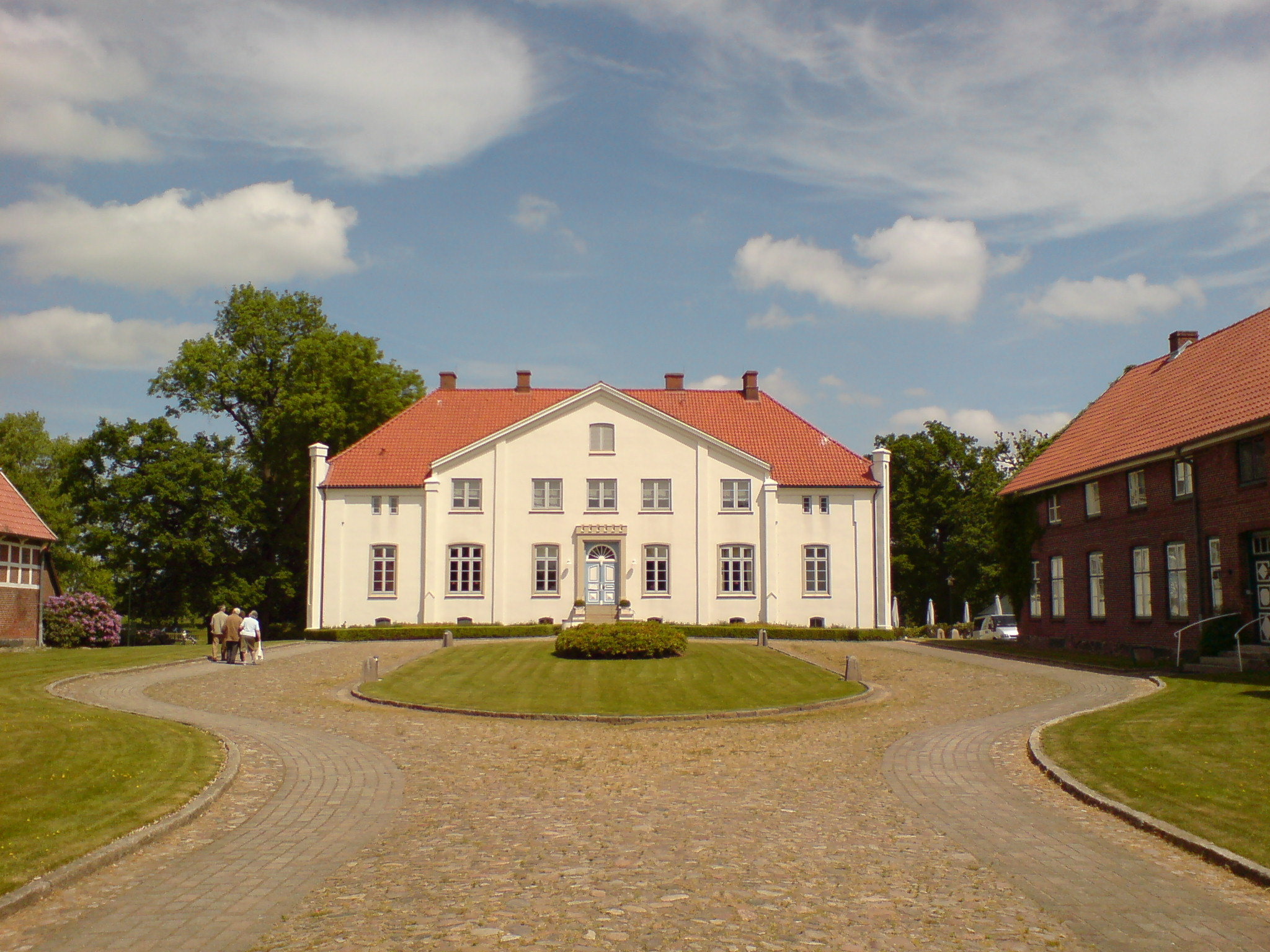
Gut Kaden
