= Nehms =

- Municipality
- Coat of arms

- Location of Nehms within Segeberg district
- Interactive map of Nehms
- Location within Germany Location within Schleswig-Holstein
- Coordinates: 54°1′N 10°22′E
- Country: Germany
- State: Schleswig-Holstein
- District: Segeberg
- Municipal assoc.: Trave-Land

Government
  - Mayor: Ernst August Lawerentz

Area
  - Total: 15.31 km^{2} (5.91 sq mi)
- Elevation: 70 m (230 ft)

Population (2025-12-31)
  - Total: 566
  - Density: 37.0/km^{2} (95.8/sq mi)
- Time zone: UTC+01:00 (CET)
  - Summer (DST): UTC+02:00 (CEST)
- Postal codes: 23813
- Dialling codes: 04557 und 04555
- Vehicle registration: SE
- Website: www.amt-trave- land.de

Nehms is a municipality in the district of Segeberg, in Schleswig-Holstein, Germany.
