= Negernbötel =

- Municipality
- Coat of arms

- Location of Negernbötel within Segeberg district
- Interactive map of Negernbötel
- Location within Germany Location within Schleswig-Holstein
- Coordinates: 53°59′4″N 10°15′1″E
- Country: Germany
- State: Schleswig-Holstein
- District: Segeberg
- Municipal assoc.: Trave-Land

Government
  - Mayor: Marco Timme

Area
  - Total: 16.97 km^{2} (6.55 sq mi)
- Elevation: 41 m (135 ft)

Population (2025-12-31)
  - Total: 1,002
  - Density: 59.05/km^{2} (152.9/sq mi)
- Time zone: UTC+01:00 (CET)
  - Summer (DST): UTC+02:00 (CEST)
- Postal codes: 23795
- Dialling codes: 04328, 04551
- Vehicle registration: SE
- Website: www.amt-trave- land.de

Negernbötel is a municipality in the district of Segeberg, in Schleswig-Holstein, Germany.
