= Todesfelde =

- Municipality
- Coat of arms

- Location of Todesfelde within Segeberg district
- Interactive map of Todesfelde
- Location within Germany Location within Schleswig-Holstein
- Coordinates: 53°53′N 10°10′E
- Country: Germany
- State: Schleswig-Holstein
- District: Segeberg
- Municipal assoc.: Leezen
- Subdivisions: 2

Government
  - Mayor: Karl-Heinz Ziegenbein

Area
  - Total: 17.24 km^{2} (6.66 sq mi)
- Elevation: 36 m (118 ft)

Population (2025-12-31)
  - Total: 1,059
  - Density: 61.43/km^{2} (159.1/sq mi)
- Time zone: UTC+01:00 (CET)
  - Summer (DST): UTC+02:00 (CEST)
- Postal codes: 23826
- Dialling codes: 04558
- Vehicle registration: SE
- Website: https://todesfelde.de/

Todesfelde is a municipality in the district of Segeberg, in Schleswig-Holstein, Germany.
