= Wiemersdorf =

- Municipality
- Coat of arms

- Location of Wiemersdorf within Segeberg district
- Interactive map of Wiemersdorf
- Location within Germany Location within Schleswig-Holstein
- Coordinates: 53°58′N 9°54′E
- Country: Germany
- State: Schleswig-Holstein
- District: Segeberg
- Municipal assoc.: Bad Bramstedt-Land

Government
  - Mayor: Gerd Sick

Area
  - Total: 17.55 km^{2} (6.78 sq mi)
- Elevation: 28 m (92 ft)

Population (2025-12-31)
  - Total: 1,723
  - Density: 98.18/km^{2} (254.3/sq mi)
- Time zone: UTC+01:00 (CET)
  - Summer (DST): UTC+02:00 (CEST)
- Postal codes: 24649
- Dialling codes: 04192
- Vehicle registration: SE
- Website: www.amt-bad- bramstedt-land.de

Wiemersdorf is a municipality in the district of Segeberg, in Schleswig-Holstein, Germany.
