= Bad Bramstedt-Land =

- Amt
- Map of Segeberg highlighting Bad Bramstedt-Land
- Interactive map of Bad Bramstedt-Land
- Location within Germany Location within Schleswig-Holstein
- Coordinates: 53°55′07″N 9°53′04″E
- Country: Germany
- State: Schleswig-Holstein
- District: Segeberg
- Seat: Bad Bramstedt
- Subdivisions: 14 municipalities

Area
  - Total: 186.33 km^{2} (71.94 sq mi)

Population (2025-12-31)
  - Total: 11,384
  - Density: 61.096/km^{2} (158.24/sq mi)
- Time zone: UTC+01:00 (CET)
  - Summer (DST): UTC+02:00 (CEST)
- Website: www.amt-bad-bramstedt-land.de

Bad Bramstedt-Land is an Amt ("collective municipality") in the district of Segeberg, in Schleswig-Holstein, Germany. It is situated around Bad Bramstedt, which is the seat of the Amt, but not part of it.

The Amt Bad Bramstedt-Land consists of the following municipalities:

1. Armstedt
2. Bimöhlen
3. Borstel
4. Föhrden-Barl
5. Fuhlendorf
6. Großenaspe
7. Hagen
8. Hardebek
9. Hasenkrug
10. Heidmoor
11. Hitzhusen
12. Mönkloh
13. Weddelbrook
14. Wiemersdorf
