= Kattendorf =

- Municipality
- Coat of arms

- Location of Kattendorf within Segeberg district
- Interactive map of Kattendorf
- Location within Germany Location within Schleswig-Holstein
- Coordinates: 53°50′38″N 10°1′32″E
- Country: Germany
- State: Schleswig-Holstein
- District: Segeberg
- Municipal assoc.: Kisdorf

Government
  - Mayor: Thorsten Barth (CDU)

Area
  - Total: 9.84 km^{2} (3.80 sq mi)
- Elevation: 59 m (194 ft)

Population (2025-12-31)
  - Total: 791
  - Density: 80.4/km^{2} (208/sq mi)
- Time zone: UTC+01:00 (CET)
  - Summer (DST): UTC+02:00 (CEST)
- Postal codes: 24568
- Dialling codes: 04191
- Vehicle registration: SE
- Website: www.kattendorf.de

Kattendorf is a municipality in the district of Segeberg, in Schleswig-Holstein, Germany.
