= Bißnitz =

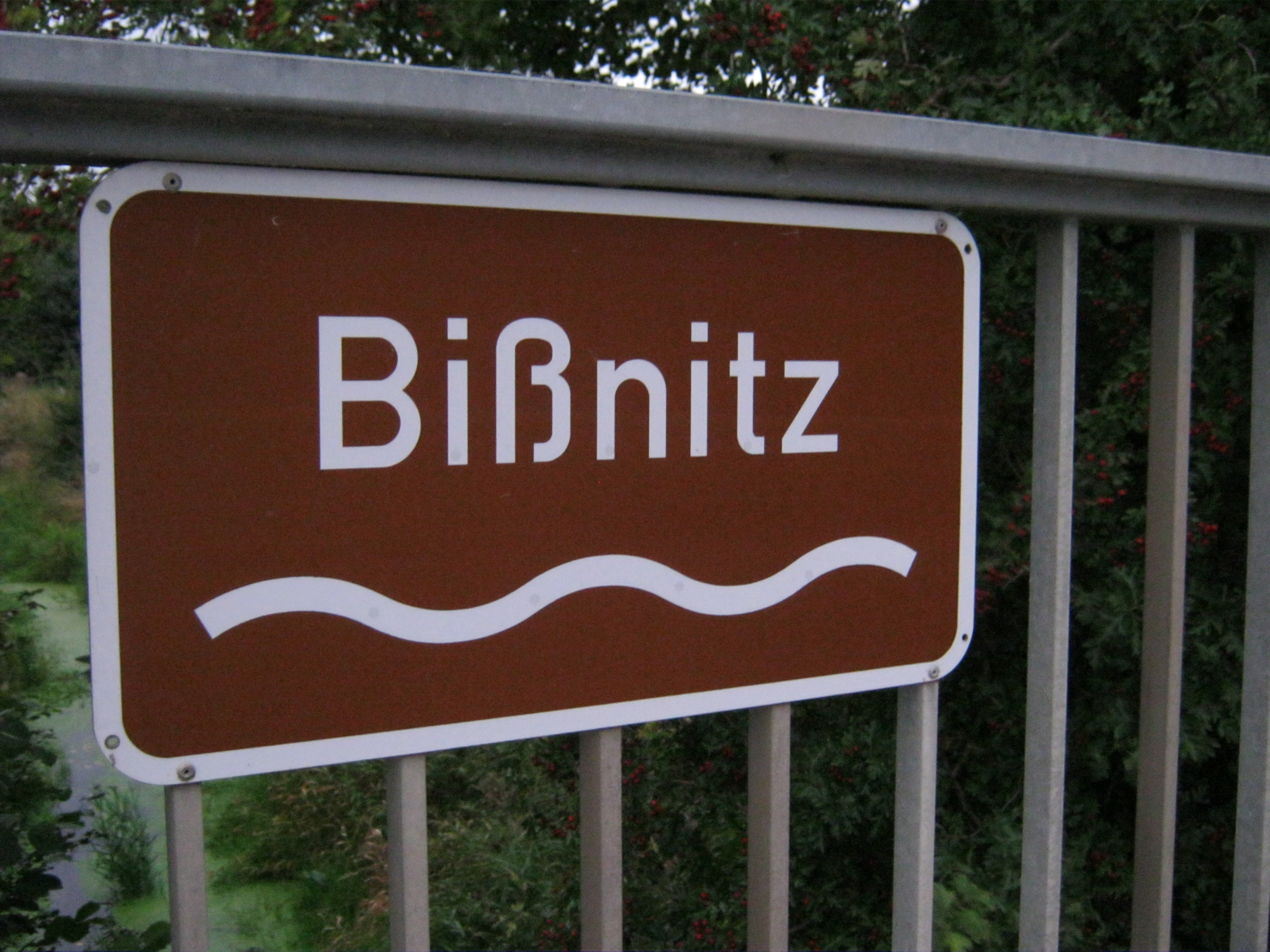

Location
- Country: Germany
- State: Schleswig-Holstein

Physical characteristics
- Mouth
  - location: Wardersee
  - coordinates: 53.9535°N 10.4557°E

Basin features
- Progression: Trave→ Baltic Sea

Bißnitz (historically written as Bissnitz) is a river of Schleswig-Holstein, Germany. It flows into the Wardersee, which is drained by the Trave.

== See also ==
- List of rivers of Schleswig-Holstein
