= Hasenmoor =

- Municipality
- Coat of arms

- Location of Hasenmoor within Segeberg district
- Interactive map of Hasenmoor
- Location within Germany Location within Schleswig-Holstein
- Coordinates: 53°54′N 9°59′E
- Country: Germany
- State: Schleswig-Holstein
- District: Segeberg
- Municipal assoc.: Auenland Südholstein

Government
  - Mayor: Klaus-Wilhelm Schümann

Area
  - Total: 17.77 km^{2} (6.86 sq mi)
- Elevation: 27 m (89 ft)

Population (2025-12-31)
  - Total: 767
  - Density: 43.2/km^{2} (112/sq mi)
- Time zone: UTC+01:00 (CET)
  - Summer (DST): UTC+02:00 (CEST)
- Postal codes: 24640
- Dialling codes: 04195
- Vehicle registration: SE
- Website: www.kaltenkirchen- land.de

Hasenmoor is a municipality in the district of Segeberg, in Schleswig-Holstein, Germany.
