= Glasau =

- Municipality
- Coat of arms

- Location of Glasau within Segeberg district
- Interactive map of Glasau
- Location within Germany Location within Schleswig-Holstein
- Coordinates: 54°03′N 10°31′E
- Country: Germany
- State: Schleswig-Holstein
- District: Segeberg
- Municipal assoc.: Trave-Land

Government
  - Mayor: Henning Frahm

Area
  - Total: 18.82 km^{2} (7.27 sq mi)
- Elevation: 42 m (138 ft)

Population (2025-12-31)
  - Total: 795
  - Density: 42.2/km^{2} (109/sq mi)
- Time zone: UTC+01:00 (CET)
  - Summer (DST): UTC+02:00 (CEST)
- Postal codes: 23719
- Dialling codes: 04525
- Vehicle registration: SE
- Website: www.amt-trave- land.de

Glasau is a municipality in the district of Segeberg, in Schleswig-Holstein, Germany. It is named after the estate and the manor house of the same name. Sarau is the largest village in the municipality; about half of the population lives there.

== History ==
From March 29, 1945 until May 5, 1945 a concentration camp was established near Glasau. It was a subcamp to the Neuengamme concentration camp.

== See also ==
- List of subcamps of Neuengamme
