= Winsen, Schleswig-Holstein =

Winsen
- Municipality
- Coat of arms

- Location of Winsen within Segeberg district
- Interactive map of Winsen
- Location within Germany Location within Schleswig-Holstein
- Coordinates: 53°49′56″N 10°0′42″E
- Country: Germany
- State: Schleswig-Holstein
- District: Segeberg
- Municipal assoc.: Kisdorf

Government
  - Mayor: Kurt Bonekamp

Area
  - Total: 4.08 km^{2} (1.58 sq mi)
- Elevation: 37 m (121 ft)

Population (2025-12-31)
  - Total: 366
  - Density: 89.7/km^{2} (232/sq mi)
- Time zone: UTC+01:00 (CET)
  - Summer (DST): UTC+02:00 (CEST)
- Postal codes: 24568
- Dialling codes: 04191
- Vehicle registration: SE
- Website: www.winsen-holstein.de

Winsen (German pronunciation: [ˈvɪnzn̩]) is a municipality in the district of Segeberg, in Schleswig-Holstein, Germany.
