= Strukdorf =

- Municipality
- Location of Strukdorf within Segeberg district
- Interactive map of Strukdorf
- Location within Germany Location within Schleswig-Holstein
- Coordinates: 53°55′N 10°29′E
- Country: Germany
- State: Schleswig-Holstein
- District: Segeberg
- Municipal assoc.: Trave-Land

Government
  - Mayor: Götz Leonhardt

Area
  - Total: 7.30 km^{2} (2.82 sq mi)
- Elevation: 53 m (174 ft)

Population (2025-12-31)
  - Total: 242
  - Density: 33.2/km^{2} (85.9/sq mi)
- Time zone: UTC+01:00 (CET)
  - Summer (DST): UTC+02:00 (CEST)
- Postal codes: 23815
- Dialling codes: 04553
- Vehicle registration: SE
- Website: www.amt-trave- land.de

Strukdorf is a municipality in the district of Segeberg, in Schleswig-Holstein, Germany.
