= Traventhal =

- Municipality
- Coat of arms

- Location of Traventhal within Segeberg district
- Interactive map of Traventhal
- Location within Germany Location within Schleswig-Holstein
- Coordinates: 53°53′56″N 10°19′8″E
- Country: Germany
- State: Schleswig-Holstein
- District: Segeberg
- Municipal assoc.: Trave-Land

Government
  - Mayor: Udo Bardowicks

Area
  - Total: 5.37 km^{2} (2.07 sq mi)
- Elevation: 35 m (115 ft)

Population (2025-12-31)
  - Total: 515
  - Density: 95.9/km^{2} (248/sq mi)
- Time zone: UTC+01:00 (CET)
  - Summer (DST): UTC+02:00 (CEST)
- Postal codes: 23795
- Dialling codes: 04551
- Vehicle registration: SE
- Website: www.amt-trave- land.de

Traventhal is a municipality in the district of Segeberg, in Schleswig-Holstein, Germany. It gave name to the Peace of Travendal treaty signed there in 1700.
