= Travenhorst =

- Municipality
- Location of Travenhorst within Segeberg district
- Interactive map of Travenhorst
- Location within Germany Location within Schleswig-Holstein
- Coordinates: 54°1′N 10°26′E
- Country: Germany
- State: Schleswig-Holstein
- District: Segeberg
- Municipal assoc.: Trave-Land

Government
  - Mayor: Michael Göttsche

Area
  - Total: 8.52 km^{2} (3.29 sq mi)
- Elevation: 29 m (95 ft)

Population (2025-12-31)
  - Total: 191
  - Density: 22.4/km^{2} (58.1/sq mi)
- Time zone: UTC+01:00 (CET)
  - Summer (DST): UTC+02:00 (CEST)
- Postal codes: 23827
- Dialling codes: 04556
- Vehicle registration: SE
- Website: www.amt-trave- land.de

Travenhorst is a municipality in the district of Segeberg, in Schleswig-Holstein, Germany. It ranges from -2 °C to 22 °C over the course of the year.
