= Neversdorf =

- Municipality
- Coat of arms

- Location of Neversdorf within Segeberg district
- Interactive map of Neversdorf
- Location within Germany Location within Schleswig-Holstein
- Coordinates: 53°51′59″N 10°17′16″E
- Country: Germany
- State: Schleswig-Holstein
- District: Segeberg
- Municipal assoc.: Leezen

Government
  - Mayor: Heinz Stockrahm

Area
  - Total: 7.22 km^{2} (2.79 sq mi)
- Elevation: 31 m (102 ft)

Population (2025-12-31)
  - Total: 717
  - Density: 99.3/km^{2} (257/sq mi)
- Time zone: UTC+01:00 (CET)
  - Summer (DST): UTC+02:00 (CEST)
- Postal codes: 23816
- Dialling codes: 04552
- Vehicle registration: SE
- Website: www.amt-leezen.de

Neversdorf is a municipality in the district of Segeberg, in Schleswig-Holstein, Germany.
