= Leezen (Amt) =

Municipality in Schleswig-Holstein, Germany

- Amt
- Map of Segeberg highlighting Leezen
- Interactive map of Leezen
- Location within Germany Location within Schleswig-Holstein
- Coordinates: 53°52′N 10°15′E
- Country: Germany
- State: Schleswig-Holstein
- District: Segeberg
- Seat: Leezen
- Subdivisions: 12 municipalities

Area
  - Total: 132.4 km^{2} (51.1 sq mi)

Population (2025-12-31)
  - Total: 9,052
  - Density: 68.37/km^{2} (177.1/sq mi)
- Time zone: UTC+01:00 (CET)
  - Summer (DST): UTC+02:00 (CEST)
- Website: www.amt-leezen.de

Leezen is an Amt ("collective municipality") in the district of Segeberg, in Schleswig-Holstein, Germany. The seat of the Amt is in Leezen.

The Amt Leezen consists of the following municipalities:

1. Bark
2. Bebensee
3. Fredesdorf
4. Groß Niendorf
5. Högersdorf
6. Kükels
7. Leezen
8. Mözen
9. Neversdorf
10. Schwissel
11. Todesfelde
12. Wittenborn
