= Oersdorf =

- Municipality
- Coat of arms

- Location of Oersdorf within Segeberg district
- Interactive map of Oersdorf
- Location within Germany Location within Schleswig-Holstein
- Coordinates: 53°50′N 9°59′E
- Country: Germany
- State: Schleswig-Holstein
- District: Segeberg
- Municipal assoc.: Kisdorf

Government
  - Mayor: Joachim Kebschull

Area
  - Total: 6.65 km^{2} (2.57 sq mi)
- Elevation: 17 m (56 ft)

Population (2025-12-31)
  - Total: 879
  - Density: 132/km^{2} (342/sq mi)
- Time zone: UTC+01:00 (CET)
  - Summer (DST): UTC+02:00 (CEST)
- Postal codes: 24568
- Dialling codes: 04191
- Vehicle registration: SE
- Website: www.amt-kisdorf.de

Oersdorf is a municipality in the district of Segeberg, in Schleswig-Holstein, Germany. It was founded in 1496.
