= Schackendorf =

- Municipality
- Coat of arms

- Location of Schackendorf within Segeberg district
- Interactive map of Schackendorf
- Location within Germany Location within Schleswig-Holstein
- Coordinates: 53°57′33″N 10°16′15″E
- Country: Germany
- State: Schleswig-Holstein
- District: Segeberg
- Municipal assoc.: Trave-Land

Government
  - Mayor: Alexander Scheffler

Area
  - Total: 7.85 km^{2} (3.03 sq mi)
- Elevation: 37 m (121 ft)

Population (2025-12-31)
  - Total: 899
  - Density: 115/km^{2} (297/sq mi)
- Time zone: UTC+01:00 (CET)
  - Summer (DST): UTC+02:00 (CEST)
- Postal codes: 23795
- Dialling codes: 04551
- Vehicle registration: SE
- Website: www.amt-trave- land.de

Schackendorf is a municipality in the district of Segeberg, in Schleswig-Holstein, Germany.
