= Stuvenborn =

- Municipality
- Coat of arms

- Location of Stuvenborn within Segeberg district
- Interactive map of Stuvenborn
- Location within Germany Location within Schleswig-Holstein
- Coordinates: 53°51′N 10°8′E
- Country: Germany
- State: Schleswig-Holstein
- District: Segeberg
- Municipal assoc.: Kisdorf

Government
  - Mayor: Torsten Kowitz (CDU)

Area
  - Total: 7.97 km^{2} (3.08 sq mi)
- Elevation: 29 m (95 ft)

Population (2025-12-31)
  - Total: 866
  - Density: 109/km^{2} (281/sq mi)
- Time zone: UTC+01:00 (CET)
  - Summer (DST): UTC+02:00 (CEST)
- Postal codes: 24641
- Dialling codes: 04194
- Vehicle registration: SE
- Website: www.amt-kisdorf.de

Stuvenborn is a municipality in the district of Segeberg, in Schleswig-Holstein, Germany.
