= Heidmühlen =

- Municipality
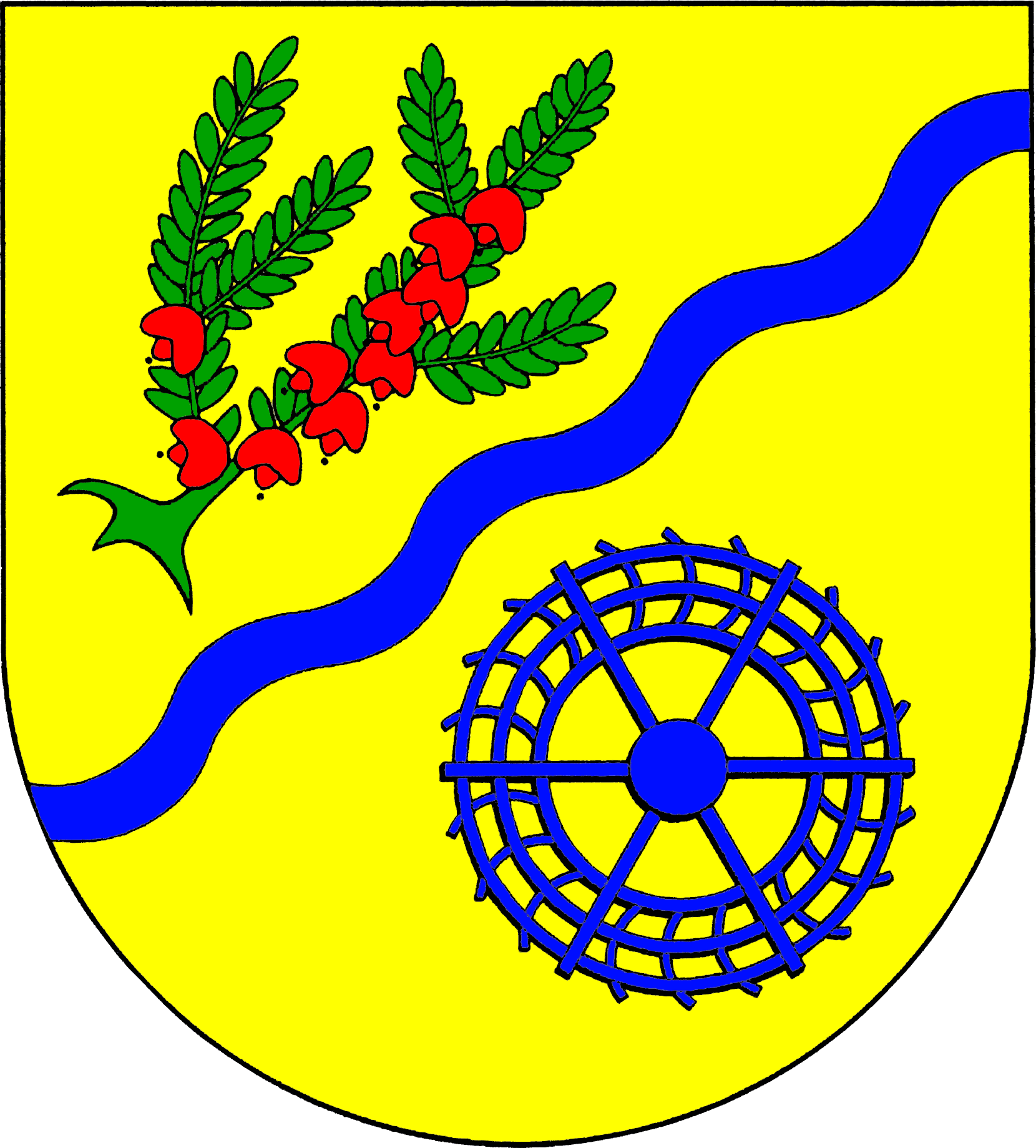
- Coat of arms

- Location of Heidmühlen within Segeberg district
- Interactive map of Heidmühlen
- Location within Germany Location within Schleswig-Holstein
- Coordinates: 53°58′N 10°5′E
- Country: Germany
- State: Schleswig-Holstein
- District: Segeberg
- Municipal assoc.: Boostedt-Rickling

Government
  - Mayor: Geert Uwe Carstensen

Area
  - Total: 17.83 km^{2} (6.88 sq mi)
- Elevation: 29 m (95 ft)

Population (2025-12-31)
  - Total: 664
  - Density: 37.2/km^{2} (96.5/sq mi)
- Time zone: UTC+01:00 (CET)
  - Summer (DST): UTC+02:00 (CEST)
- Postal codes: 24635
- Dialling codes: 04320
- Vehicle registration: SE
- Website: www.heidmuehlen.de

Heidmühlen is a municipality in the district of Segeberg in Schleswig-Holstein, Germany. It contains the areas of Mühlenholz and Klint.

== Geography ==
Heidmühlen is about 12 km southeast of Neumünster, 14 km northeast of Bad Bramstedt and 14 km west of Bad Segeberg. A portion of the Eekholt Wild Park is contained in Heidmühlen.

== Economy ==
The community consists of a mainly agricultural economy.

== Politics ==
Following the 2003 election, the nine seats of the Heidmühlen community council were allocated to four members of the CDU, three members of the local voting group WGH and two independent candidates.
