= Auenland Südholstein =

- Amt
- Map of Segeberg highlighting Auenland Südholstein
- Interactive map of Auenland Südholstein
- Location within Germany Location within Schleswig-Holstein
- Coordinates: 53°50′N 9°58′E
- Country: Germany
- State: Schleswig-Holstein
- District: Segeberg
- Seat: Nützen
- Subdivisions: 6 municipalities

Area
  - Total: 115.73 km^{2} (44.68 sq mi)

Population (2025-12-31)
  - Total: 11,362
  - Density: 98.177/km^{2} (254.28/sq mi)
- Time zone: UTC+01:00 (CET)
  - Summer (DST): UTC+02:00 (CEST)
- Website: www.auenland-suedholstein.de

Auenland Südholstein is an Amt ("collective municipality") in the district of Segeberg, in Schleswig-Holstein, Germany. Its seat is in Nützen. Before 1 April 2022, the name of the Amt was Kaltenkirchen-Land, and its seat was in the town Kaltenkirchen.

The Amt Auenland Südholstein consists of the following municipalities:

1. Alveslohe
2. Hartenholm
3. Hasenmoor
4. Lentföhrden
5. Nützen
6. Schmalfeld
