= Hüttblek =

- Municipality
- Coat of arms

- Location of Hüttblek within Segeberg district
- Interactive map of Hüttblek
- Location within Germany Location within Schleswig-Holstein
- Coordinates: 53°50′N 10°4′E
- Country: Germany
- State: Schleswig-Holstein
- District: Segeberg
- Municipal assoc.: Kisdorf

Government
  - Mayor: Frank Timmermann

Area
  - Total: 2.75 km^{2} (1.06 sq mi)
- Elevation: 36 m (118 ft)

Population (2025-12-31)
  - Total: 385
  - Density: 140/km^{2} (363/sq mi)
- Time zone: UTC+01:00 (CET)
  - Summer (DST): UTC+02:00 (CEST)
- Postal codes: 24641
- Dialling codes: 04194
- Vehicle registration: SE
- Website: www.amt-kisdorf.de

Hüttblek is a municipality in the district of Segeberg, in Schleswig-Holstein, Germany.
