= Blunk =

- Municipality
- Coat of arms

- Location of Blunk within Segeberg district
- Interactive map of Blunk
- Location within Germany Location within Schleswig-Holstein
- Coordinates: 54°1′N 10°19′E
- Country: Germany
- State: Schleswig-Holstein
- District: Segeberg
- Municipal assoc.: Trave-Land

Government
  - Mayor: Wiebke Bock

Area
  - Total: 10.69 km^{2} (4.13 sq mi)
- Elevation: 48 m (157 ft)

Population (2025-12-31)
  - Total: 555
  - Density: 51.9/km^{2} (134/sq mi)
- Time zone: UTC+01:00 (CET)
  - Summer (DST): UTC+02:00 (CEST)
- Postal codes: 23813
- Dialling codes: 04557
- Vehicle registration: SE
- Website: www.amt-trave-land.de

Blunk is a municipality in the district of Segeberg, in Schleswig-Holstein, Germany.
