= Weddelbrook =

- Municipality
- Coat of arms

- Location of Weddelbrook within Segeberg district
- Interactive map of Weddelbrook
- Location within Germany Location within Schleswig-Holstein
- Coordinates: 53°54′N 9°50′E
- Country: Germany
- State: Schleswig-Holstein
- District: Segeberg
- Municipal assoc.: Bad Bramstedt-Land

Government
  - Mayor: Stefan Gärtner

Area
  - Total: 14.05 km^{2} (5.42 sq mi)
- Elevation: 19 m (62 ft)

Population (2025-12-31)
  - Total: 1,093
  - Density: 77.79/km^{2} (201.5/sq mi)
- Time zone: UTC+01:00 (CET)
  - Summer (DST): UTC+02:00 (CEST)
- Postal codes: 24576
- Dialling codes: 04192
- Vehicle registration: SE
- Website: www.weddelbrook.de

Weddelbrook is a municipality in the district of Segeberg, in Schleswig-Holstein, Germany.
