= Bühnsdorf =

- Municipality
- Coat of arms

- Location of Bühnsdorf within Segeberg district
- Interactive map of Bühnsdorf
- Location within Germany Location within Schleswig-Holstein
- Coordinates: 53°53′20″N 10°22′25″E
- Country: Germany
- State: Schleswig-Holstein
- District: Segeberg
- Municipal assoc.: Trave-Land

Government
  - Mayor: Marlies Pielburg

Area
  - Total: 4.15 km^{2} (1.60 sq mi)
- Elevation: 53 m (174 ft)

Population (2025-12-31)
  - Total: 383
  - Density: 92.3/km^{2} (239/sq mi)
- Time zone: UTC+01:00 (CET)
  - Summer (DST): UTC+02:00 (CEST)
- Postal codes: 23845
- Dialling codes: 04550
- Vehicle registration: SE
- Website: www.amt-trave- land.de

Bühnsdorf is a municipality in the district of Segeberg, in Schleswig-Holstein, Germany.
