= Fuhlendorf, Schleswig-Holstein =

Fuhlendorf
- Municipality
- Flag Coat of arms

- Location of Fuhlendorf within Segeberg district
- Interactive map of Fuhlendorf
- Location within Germany Location within Schleswig-Holstein
- Coordinates: 53°57′N 9°53′E
- Country: Germany
- State: Schleswig-Holstein
- District: Segeberg
- Municipal assoc.: Bad Bramstedt-Land

Government
  - Mayor: Werner Lembcke

Area
  - Total: 6.49 km^{2} (2.51 sq mi)
- Elevation: 29 m (95 ft)

Population (2025-12-31)
  - Total: 422
  - Density: 65.0/km^{2} (168/sq mi)
- Time zone: UTC+01:00 (CET)
  - Summer (DST): UTC+02:00 (CEST)
- Postal codes: 24649
- Dialling codes: 04192
- Vehicle registration: SE
- Website: www.amt-bad- bramstedt-land.de

Fuhlendorf is a municipality in the district of Segeberg, in Schleswig-Holstein, Germany. Its airfield is home to one of the five German Federal Police helicopter squadrons.
