= Pronstorf =

- Municipality
- Coat of arms

- Location of Pronstorf within Segeberg district
- Interactive map of Pronstorf
- Location within Germany Location within Schleswig-Holstein
- Coordinates: 53°57′31″N 10°28′13″E
- Country: Germany
- State: Schleswig-Holstein
- District: Segeberg
- Municipal assoc.: Trave-Land

Government
  - Mayor: Bettina Albert (CDU)

Area
  - Total: 36.31 km^{2} (14.02 sq mi)
- Elevation: 37 m (121 ft)

Population (2025-12-31)
  - Total: 1,553
  - Density: 42.77/km^{2} (110.8/sq mi)
- Time zone: UTC+01:00 (CET)
  - Summer (DST): UTC+02:00 (CEST)
- Postal codes: 23820
- Dialling codes: 04553 / 04556 / 04506
- Vehicle registration: SE
- Website: www.amt-trave- land.de

Pronstorf is a municipality in the district of Segeberg, in Schleswig-Holstein, Germany.

== Famous residents ==
- Major General Paul Emil von Lettow-Vorbeck, the commander of the Imperial German Army during the East African Campaign, was buried in Pronstorf upon his death in 1964.
