= Boostedt =

- Municipality
- Coat of arms

- Location of Boostedt within Segeberg district
- Interactive map of Boostedt
- Location within Germany Location within Schleswig-Holstein
- Coordinates: 54°0′32″N 10°1′33″E
- Country: Germany
- State: Schleswig-Holstein
- District: Segeberg
- Municipal assoc.: Boostedt-Rickling

Government
  - Mayor: Hartmut König (CDU)

Area
  - Total: 27.11 km^{2} (10.47 sq mi)
- Elevation: 47 m (154 ft)

Population (2025-12-31)
  - Total: 5,576
  - Density: 205.7/km^{2} (532.7/sq mi)
- Time zone: UTC+01:00 (CET)
  - Summer (DST): UTC+02:00 (CEST)
- Postal codes: 24598
- Dialling codes: 04393
- Vehicle registration: SE
- Website: www.boostedt.de

Boostedt is a municipality in the district of Segeberg, in Schleswig-Holstein, Germany. It is situated approximately 50 km north of Hamburg, and 7 km south of Neumünster.

== Geography ==
Boostedt lies in the southern part of the state of Schleswig-Holstein. The coasts of the North Sea and the Baltic Sea are each located about a one-hour drive away. The distance from Boostedt to Hamburg in the south and to Kiel in the north is about 50 km. Boostedt is within the northernmost tip of the Hamburg Metropolitan Region.
