= Schieren, Germany =

Schieren
- Municipality
- Coat of arms

- Location of Schieren within Segeberg district
- Interactive map of Schieren
- Location within Germany Location within Schleswig-Holstein
- Coordinates: 53°57′N 10°23′E
- Country: Germany
- State: Schleswig-Holstein
- District: Segeberg
- Municipal assoc.: Trave-Land

Government
  - Mayor: Hans-Werner Schumacher

Area
  - Total: 6.36 km^{2} (2.46 sq mi)
- Elevation: 40 m (130 ft)

Population (2025-12-31)
  - Total: 253
  - Density: 39.8/km^{2} (103/sq mi)
- Time zone: UTC+01:00 (CET)
  - Summer (DST): UTC+02:00 (CEST)
- Postal codes: 23795
- Dialling codes: 04551
- Vehicle registration: SE
- Website: www.amt-trave- land.de

Schieren (German pronunciation: [ˈʃiːʁən]) is a municipality in the district of Segeberg, in Schleswig-Holstein, Germany.
