= Itzstedt (Amt) =

- Amt
- Location of the Itzstedt Amt within Segeberg district (Tangstedt, Kreis Stormarn shaded)
- Interactive map of Itzstedt
- Location within Germany Location within Schleswig-Holstein
- Coordinates: 53°49′N 10°10′E
- Country: Germany
- State: Schleswig-Holstein
- District: Segeberg and Stormarn
- Seat: Itzstedt
- Subdivisions: 7 municipalities

Government
  - Mayor: Gerhard Brors (CDU)

Area
  - Total: 108.3 km^{2} (41.8 sq mi)

Population (2025-12-31)
  - Total: 19,186
  - Density: 177.2/km^{2} (458.8/sq mi)
- Time zone: UTC+01:00 (CET)
  - Summer (DST): UTC+02:00 (CEST)
- Vehicle registration: SE, OD
- Website: www.amt-itzstedt.eu

Itzstedt is an Amt ("collective municipality") in the districts of Segeberg and Stormarn, in Schleswig-Holstein, Germany. The seat of the Amt is in Itzstedt.

== Overview ==
It is one of the two Ämter (with Großer Plöner See) in Germany that joins municipalities into two different districts, but only Tangstedt is located in Stormarn.

== Subdivision ==
The Amt Itzstedt consists of the following municipalities:

1. Itzstedt
2. Kayhude
3. Nahe
4. Oering
5. Seth
6. Sülfeld
7. Tangstedt (Stormarn district)
