= Dreggers =

German municipality in Segeberg, Schleswig-Holstein

- Municipality
- Location of Dreggers within Segeberg district
- Interactive map of Dreggers
- Location within Germany Location within Schleswig-Holstein
- Coordinates: 53°53′7″N 10°20′45″E
- Country: Germany
- State: Schleswig-Holstein
- District: Segeberg
- Municipal assoc.: Trave-Land

Government
  - Mayor: Nye James

Area
  - Total: 2.79 km^{2} (1.08 sq mi)
- Elevation: 40 m (130 ft)

Population (2025-12-31)
  - Total: 55
  - Density: 20/km^{2} (51/sq mi)
- Time zone: UTC+01:00 (CET)
  - Summer (DST): UTC+02:00 (CEST)
- Postal codes: 23845
- Dialling codes: 04550
- Vehicle registration: SE
- Website: AMT-Trave- Land.de

Dreggers is a municipality in the district of Segeberg, in Schleswig-Holstein, Germany.
