= Fahrenkrug =

- Municipality
- Coat of arms

- Location of Fahrenkrug within Segeberg district
- Interactive map of Fahrenkrug
- Location within Germany Location within Schleswig-Holstein
- Coordinates: 53°56′N 10°15′E
- Country: Germany
- State: Schleswig-Holstein
- District: Segeberg
- Municipal assoc.: Trave-Land

Government
  - Mayor: Reiner G. Martin (CDU)

Area
  - Total: 6.62 km^{2} (2.56 sq mi)
- Elevation: 27 m (89 ft)

Population (2025-12-31)
  - Total: 1,751
  - Density: 265/km^{2} (685/sq mi)
- Time zone: UTC+01:00 (CET)
  - Summer (DST): UTC+02:00 (CEST)
- Postal codes: 23795
- Dialling codes: 04551
- Vehicle registration: SE
- Website: www.amt-trave- land.de

Fahrenkrug is a municipality in the district of Segeberg, in Schleswig-Holstein, Germany which includes the villages of Rotenhahn and Ziegelei. Fahrenkrug was first mentioned in 1192 as Varencroch and belonged to the monastery of Bad Segeberg. The name Varencroch means a fern and corner, and the coat of arms of the municipality includes these symbols.

In prehistoric times, humans were known to settle in Fahrenkrug. Along with stone axes and tools from the Stone Age, there were also significant finds in Bronze Age barrows, such as a golden ring.
