= Klein Rönnau =

- Municipality
- Coat of arms

- Location of Klein Rönnau within Segeberg district
- Interactive map of Klein Rönnau
- Location within Germany Location within Schleswig-Holstein
- Coordinates: 53°57′42″N 10°19′15″E
- Country: Germany
- State: Schleswig-Holstein
- District: Segeberg
- Municipal assoc.: Trave-Land

Government
  - Mayor: Dietrich Herms (CDU)

Area
  - Total: 4.53 km^{2} (1.75 sq mi)
- Elevation: 28 m (92 ft)

Population (2025-12-31)
  - Total: 1,897
  - Density: 419/km^{2} (1,080/sq mi)
- Time zone: UTC+01:00 (CET)
  - Summer (DST): UTC+02:00 (CEST)
- Postal codes: 23795
- Dialling codes: 04551
- Vehicle registration: SE
- Website: http://www.klein-roennau.de/

Klein Rönnau is a municipality in the district of Segeberg, in Schleswig-Holstein, Germany. On an Area of 453 acres (1.83 km^{2}) live about 1600 people. There are three car workshops, several doctors, supermarkets, and numerous clubs for riding, dog training, and the sportsclub in Klein Rönnau. Most of the inhabitants are Protestants or non-religious.

Klein Rönnau is between the lakes Großer Segeberger See, Ihlsee, Klüthsee and the Trave river. It is surrounded by smooth hills, formed by the last ice age, which are partially covered with woods.

Until the 1950s agriculture was the biggest employer, and most of the inhabitants earned their wage within the village. The municipality-crest is related to that time. The blue background reflects the water of the lakes and the rivers, the corn is a reminder of the agricultural history and the naturally grown power, and the wheel halves represent movement, momentum and drive.

Today most of the people work in Bad Segeberg, Lübeck or Hamburg, and farming has been reduced to the hobby level or has died out.

The oldest building of Klein Rönnau is a watermill established in 1649. The municipality itself was mentioned for the first time in 1150, when Saint Vicelinus, the bishop of Oldenburg, received ten villages from Emperor Lothair III as a gift. These ten municipalities were given to the monastery of Segeberg. Klein Rönnau will celebrate its 860th anniversary on 25 September 2010.

When a gravel dig site (half a mile away) expanded in 2007, evidence of a very early settlement was found. Archaeologists dated the finds (stone knives and other burial gifts) to 2000-1600 BC.

== Twin towns – sister cities ==
Klein Rönnau is twinned with:

- Pszczyna, Poland
- Tököl, Hungary
