= Kisdorf (Amt) =

Municipality in Schleswig-Holstein, Germany

- Amt
- Map of Segeberg highlighting Kisdorf
- Interactive map of Kisdorf
- Location within Germany Location within Schleswig-Holstein
- Coordinates: 53°49′N 10°01′E
- Country: Germany
- State: Schleswig-Holstein
- District: Segeberg
- Seat: Kattendorf
- Subdivisions: 9 municipalities

Area
  - Total: 88.57 km^{2} (34.20 sq mi)

Population (2025-12-31)
  - Total: 10,629
  - Density: 120.0/km^{2} (310.8/sq mi)
- Time zone: UTC+01:00 (CET)
  - Summer (DST): UTC+02:00 (CEST)
- Website: www.amt-kisdorf.de

Kisdorf is an Amt ("collective municipality") in the district of Segeberg, in Schleswig-Holstein, Germany. The seat of the Amt is in Kattendorf.

The Amt Kisdorf consists of the following municipalities:

1. Hüttblek
2. Kattendorf
3. Kisdorf
4. Oersdorf
5. Sievershütten
6. Struvenhütten
7. Stuvenborn
8. Wakendorf II
9. Winsen
