= Trave-Land =

- Amt
- Coat of arms

- Location of Trave-Land within Segeberg district
- Interactive map of Trave-Land
- Location within Germany Location within Schleswig-Holstein
- Coordinates: 53°55′N 10°19′E
- Country: Germany
- State: Schleswig-Holstein
- District: Segeberg
- Seat: Bad Segeberg
- Subdivisions: 27 municipalities

Government
  - Mayor: Gretel Jürgens

Area
  - Total: 318.34 km^{2} (122.91 sq mi)

Population (2025-12-31)
  - Total: 20,184
  - Density: 63.404/km^{2} (164.22/sq mi)
- Time zone: UTC+01:00 (CET)
  - Summer (DST): UTC+02:00 (CEST)
- Vehicle registration: SE
- Website: www.amt-trave-land.info

Trave-Land is an Amt ("collective municipality") in the district of Segeberg, in Schleswig-Holstein, Germany. It is situated around Bad Segeberg, which is the seat of the Amt, but not part of it. It is named after the river Trave, which flows through the Amt.

== Subdivision ==
The Amt Trave-Land consists of the following municipalities:

1. Bahrenhof
2. Blunk
3. Bühnsdorf
4. Dreggers
5. Fahrenkrug
6. Geschendorf
7. Glasau
8. Groß Rönnau
9. Klein Gladebrügge
10. Klein Rönnau
11. Krems II
12. Negernbötel
13. Nehms
14. Neuengörs
15. Pronstorf
16. Rohlstorf
17. Schackendorf
18. Schieren
19. Seedorf
20. Stipsdorf
21. Strukdorf
22. Travenhorst
23. Traventhal
24. Wakendorf I
25. Weede
26. Wensin
27. Westerrade

== See also ==
- Trave
- Berlin (Seedorf)
- Holstein Switzerland
