= Neuengörs =

- Municipality
- Coat of arms

- Location of Neuengörs within Segeberg district
- Interactive map of Neuengörs
- Location within Germany Location within Schleswig-Holstein
- Coordinates: 53°54′N 10°23′E
- Country: Germany
- State: Schleswig-Holstein
- District: Segeberg
- Municipal assoc.: Trave-Land

Government
  - Mayor: Thies Ehlers

Area
  - Total: 13.4 km^{2} (5.2 sq mi)
- Elevation: 39 m (128 ft)

Population (2025-12-31)
  - Total: 761
  - Density: 56.8/km^{2} (147/sq mi)
- Time zone: UTC+01:00 (CET)
  - Summer (DST): UTC+02:00 (CEST)
- Postal codes: 23818
- Dialling codes: 04550
- Vehicle registration: SE
- Website: www.amt-trave- land.de

Neuengörs is a municipality in the district of Segeberg, in Schleswig-Holstein, Germany. It consists of three villages: Neuengörs, Altengörs and Stubben. The village of Neuengörs is the center of the surrounding villages, as it has a church, a primary school and several active clubs and sports societies. The local government consists of two parties, AKW and ABKWG.
