= Großer Segeberger See =

Lake in Segeberg, Schleswig-Holstein, Germany

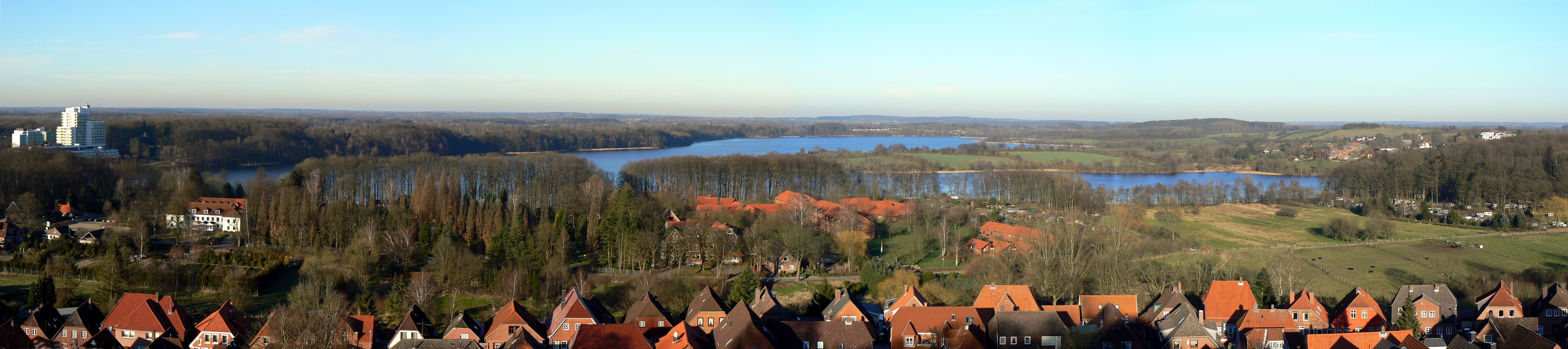

- Location within Schleswig-Holstein
- Location: Kreis Segeberg, Schleswig-Holstein
- Coordinates: 53°56′54″N 10°19′23″E
- Basin countries: Germany
- Settlements: Bad Segeberg

Großer Segeberger See is a lake in Kreis Segeberg, Schleswig-Holstein, Germany.
