= Hartenholm =

- Municipality
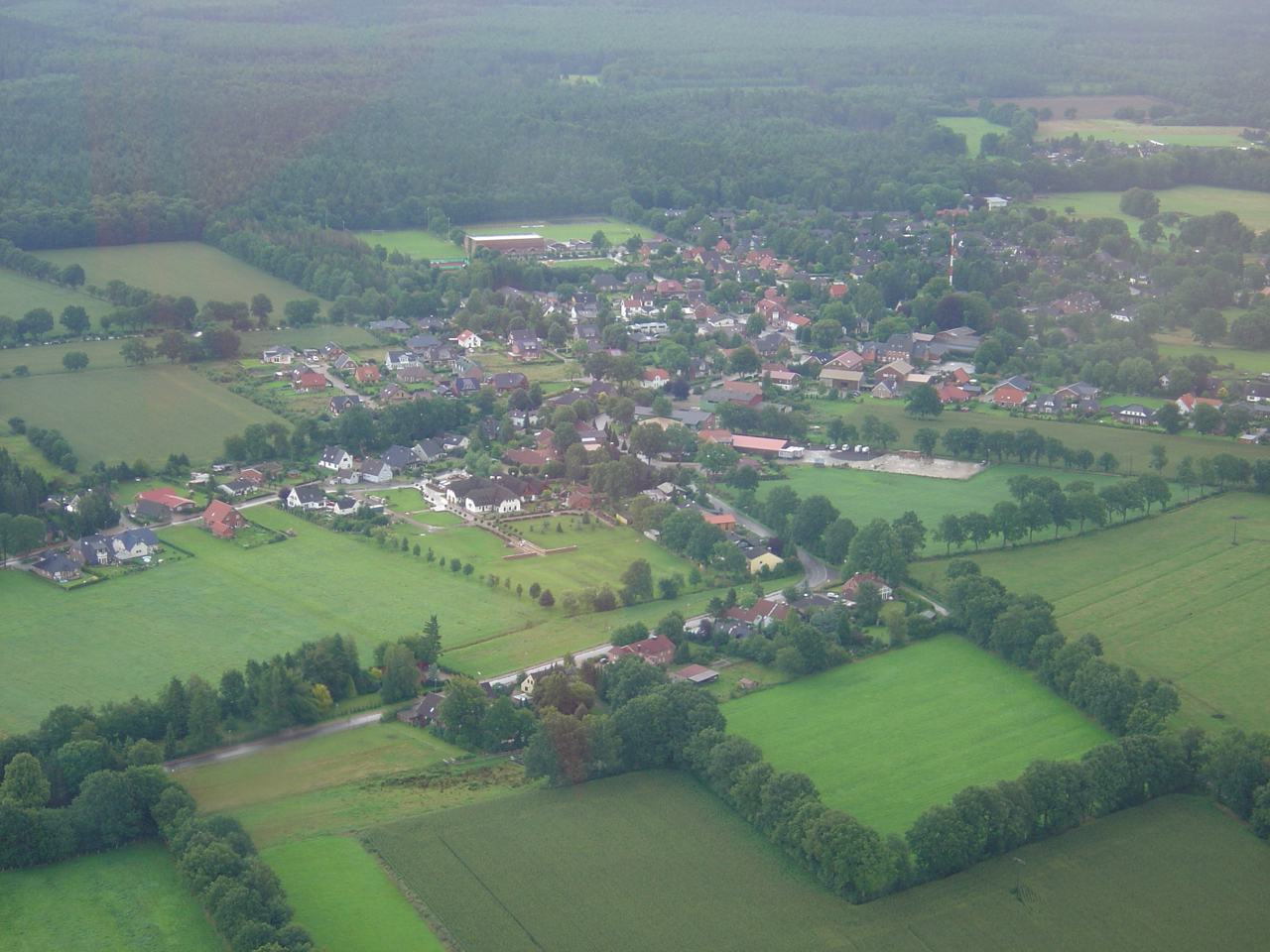

- Coat of arms

- Location of Hartenholm within Segeberg district
- Interactive map of Hartenholm
- Location within Germany Location within Schleswig-Holstein
- Coordinates: 53°54′4″N 10°3′38″E
- Country: Germany
- State: Schleswig-Holstein
- District: Segeberg
- Municipal assoc.: Auenland Südholstein

Government
  - Mayor: Karl-Heinz Panten (SPD)

Area
  - Total: 15.37 km^{2} (5.93 sq mi)
- Elevation: 33 m (108 ft)

Population (2025-12-31)
  - Total: 1,879
  - Density: 122.3/km^{2} (316.6/sq mi)
- Time zone: UTC+01:00 (CET)
  - Summer (DST): UTC+02:00 (CEST)
- Postal codes: 24628
- Dialling codes: 04195
- Vehicle registration: SE
- Website: www.hartenholm.de

Hartenholm is a municipality in the district of Segeberg, in Schleswig-Holstein, Germany.
