= Föhrden-Barl =

- Municipality
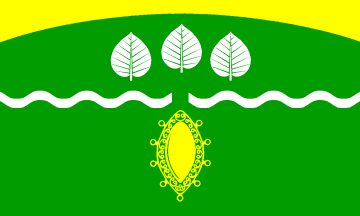
- Flag Coat of arms

- Location of Föhrden-Barl within Segeberg district
- Interactive map of Föhrden-Barl
- Location within Germany Location within Schleswig-Holstein
- Coordinates: 53°55′48″N 9°47′19″E
- Country: Germany
- State: Schleswig-Holstein
- District: Segeberg
- Municipal assoc.: Bad Bramstedt-Land

Government
  - Mayor: Hans Jochen Hasselmann

Area
  - Total: 9.23 km^{2} (3.56 sq mi)
- Elevation: 6 m (20 ft)

Population (2025-12-31)
  - Total: 291
  - Density: 31.5/km^{2} (81.7/sq mi)
- Time zone: UTC+01:00 (CET)
  - Summer (DST): UTC+02:00 (CEST)
- Postal codes: 25563
- Dialling codes: 04822
- Vehicle registration: SE
- Website: www.amt-bad- bramstedt-land.de

Föhrden-Barl is a municipality in the district of Segeberg, in Schleswig-Holstein, Germany.
