= Bebensee =

- Municipality
- Coat of arms

- Location of Bebensee within Segeberg district
- Interactive map of Bebensee
- Location within Germany Location within Schleswig-Holstein
- Coordinates: 53°53′N 10°18′E
- Country: Germany
- State: Schleswig-Holstein
- District: Segeberg
- Municipal assoc.: Leezen

Government
  - Mayor: Hans Rottgart (CDU)

Area
  - Total: 6.68 km^{2} (2.58 sq mi)
- Elevation: 33 m (108 ft)

Population (2025-12-31)
  - Total: 639
  - Density: 95.7/km^{2} (248/sq mi)
- Time zone: UTC+01:00 (CET)
  - Summer (DST): UTC+02:00 (CEST)
- Postal codes: 23816
- Dialling codes: 04552
- Vehicle registration: SE
- Website: www.amt-leezen.de

Bebensee is a municipality in the district of Segeberg, in Schleswig-Holstein, Germany.
