= Groß Rönnau =

- Municipality
- Coat of arms

- Location of Groß Rönnau within Segeberg district
- Interactive map of Groß Rönnau
- Location within Germany Location within Schleswig-Holstein
- Coordinates: 53°58′N 10°19′E
- Country: Germany
- State: Schleswig-Holstein
- District: Segeberg
- Municipal assoc.: Trave-Land

Government
  - Mayor: Joachim Rathje

Area
  - Total: 6.38 km^{2} (2.46 sq mi)
- Elevation: 32 m (105 ft)

Population (2025-12-31)
  - Total: 571
  - Density: 89.5/km^{2} (232/sq mi)
- Time zone: UTC+01:00 (CET)
  - Summer (DST): UTC+02:00 (CEST)
- Postal codes: 23795
- Dialling codes: 04551
- Vehicle registration: SE
- Website: www.amt-trave- land.de

Groß Rönnau is a municipality in the Kreis (district) of Segeberg in Schleswig-Holstein, north Germany.
