= Struvenhütten =

- Municipality
- Coat of arms

- Location of Struvenhütten within Segeberg district
- Interactive map of Struvenhütten
- Location within Germany Location within Schleswig-Holstein
- Coordinates: 53°52′4″N 10°3′18″E
- Country: Germany
- State: Schleswig-Holstein
- District: Segeberg
- Municipal assoc.: Kisdorf

Government
  - Mayor: Britta Jürgens

Area
  - Total: 12.88 km^{2} (4.97 sq mi)
- Elevation: 21 m (69 ft)

Population (2025-12-31)
  - Total: 952
  - Density: 73.9/km^{2} (191/sq mi)
- Time zone: UTC+01:00 (CET)
  - Summer (DST): UTC+02:00 (CEST)
- Postal codes: 24643
- Dialling codes: 04191, 04194, 04195
- Vehicle registration: SE
- Website: www.amt-kisdorf.de

Struvenhütten is a municipality in the district of Segeberg, in Schleswig-Holstein, Germany.

Struvenhütten is situated approximately 7 km northeast of Kaltenkirchen and 30 km southwest of Neumünster. The municipality covers an area of 12.88 km² and lies at an elevation of 21 meters above sea level. It is characterized by a rural landscape with agricultural fields and forested areas.
