= Kükels =

- Municipality
- Coat of arms

- Location of Kükels within Segeberg district
- Interactive map of Kükels
- Location within Germany Location within Schleswig-Holstein
- Coordinates: 53°54′N 10°14′E
- Country: Germany
- State: Schleswig-Holstein
- District: Segeberg
- Municipal assoc.: Leezen

Government
  - Mayor: Holger Möller (CDU)

Area
  - Total: 8.45 km^{2} (3.26 sq mi)
- Elevation: 19 m (62 ft)

Population (2025-12-31)
  - Total: 445
  - Density: 52.7/km^{2} (136/sq mi)
- Time zone: UTC+01:00 (CET)
  - Summer (DST): UTC+02:00 (CEST)
- Postal codes: 23829
- Dialling codes: 04552
- Vehicle registration: SE
- Website: www.gemeinde-kuekels.de

Kükels is a municipality in the district of Segeberg, in Schleswig-Holstein, Germany.
