= Hitzhusen =

- Municipality
- Coat of arms

- Location of Hitzhusen within Segeberg district
- Interactive map of Hitzhusen
- Location within Germany Location within Schleswig-Holstein
- Coordinates: 53°56′N 9°51′E
- Country: Germany
- State: Schleswig-Holstein
- District: Segeberg
- Municipal assoc.: Bad Bramstedt-Land

Government
  - Mayor: Claudia Peschel (CDU)

Area
  - Total: 7.93 km^{2} (3.06 sq mi)
- Elevation: 24 m (79 ft)

Population (2025-12-31)
  - Total: 1,288
  - Density: 162/km^{2} (421/sq mi)
- Time zone: UTC+01:00 (CET)
  - Summer (DST): UTC+02:00 (CEST)
- Postal codes: 24576
- Dialling codes: 04192
- Vehicle registration: SE
- Website: www.amt-bad- bramstedt-land.de

Hitzhusen is a municipality in the district of Segeberg, in Schleswig-Holstein, Germany.
