= Schmalfeld =

- Municipality
- Coat of arms

- Location of Schmalfeld within Segeberg district
- Interactive map of Schmalfeld
- Location within Germany Location within Schleswig-Holstein
- Coordinates: 53°52′39″N 9°59′7″E
- Country: Germany
- State: Schleswig-Holstein
- District: Segeberg
- Municipal assoc.: Auenland Südholstein

Government
  - Mayor: Klaus Gerdes

Area
  - Total: 19.33 km^{2} (7.46 sq mi)
- Elevation: 24 m (79 ft)

Population (2025-12-31)
  - Total: 1,969
  - Density: 101.9/km^{2} (263.8/sq mi)
- Time zone: UTC+01:00 (CET)
  - Summer (DST): UTC+02:00 (CEST)
- Postal codes: 24640
- Dialling codes: 04191, 04195
- Vehicle registration: SE
- Website: www.kaltenkirchen-land.de

Schmalfeld is a municipality in the district of Segeberg, in Schleswig-Holstein, Germany.
