= Oering =

- Municipality
- Coat of arms

- Location of Oering within Segeberg district
- Interactive map of Oering
- Location within Germany Location within Schleswig-Holstein
- Coordinates: 53°49′48″N 10°8′49″E
- Country: Germany
- State: Schleswig-Holstein
- District: Segeberg
- Municipal assoc.: Itzstedt

Government
  - Mayor: Thomas Steenbock

Area
  - Total: 9.09 km^{2} (3.51 sq mi)
- Elevation: 36 m (118 ft)

Population (2025-12-31)
  - Total: 1,395
  - Density: 153/km^{2} (397/sq mi)
- Time zone: UTC+01:00 (CET)
  - Summer (DST): UTC+02:00 (CEST)
- Postal codes: 23845
- Dialling codes: 04535
- Vehicle registration: SE
- Website: www.oering.de

Oering is a municipality in the district of Segeberg, in Schleswig-Holstein, Germany.
