= Mözen =

- Municipality
- Coat of arms

- Location of Mözen within Segeberg district
- Interactive map of Mözen
- Location within Germany Location within Schleswig-Holstein
- Coordinates: 53°55′N 10°15′E
- Country: Germany
- State: Schleswig-Holstein
- District: Segeberg
- Municipal assoc.: Leezen

Government
  - Mayor: Sabine Meyer

Area
  - Total: 7.72 km^{2} (2.98 sq mi)
- Elevation: 21 m (69 ft)

Population (2025-12-31)
  - Total: 449
  - Density: 58.2/km^{2} (151/sq mi)
- Time zone: UTC+01:00 (CET)
  - Summer (DST): UTC+02:00 (CEST)
- Postal codes: 23795
- Dialling codes: 04551
- Vehicle registration: SE
- Website: www.moezen.eu

Mözen is a municipality in the district of Segeberg, in Schleswig-Holstein, Germany.
