= Wakendorf I =

- Municipality
- Coat of arms

- Location of Wakendorf I within Segeberg district
- Interactive map of Wakendorf I
- Location within Germany Location within Schleswig-Holstein
- Coordinates: 53°52′N 10°22′E
- Country: Germany
- State: Schleswig-Holstein
- District: Segeberg
- Municipal assoc.: Trave-Land

Government
  - Mayor: Kurt Böttger

Area
  - Total: 5.34 km^{2} (2.06 sq mi)
- Elevation: 38 m (125 ft)

Population (2025-12-31)
  - Total: 488
  - Density: 91.4/km^{2} (237/sq mi)
- Time zone: UTC+01:00 (CET)
  - Summer (DST): UTC+02:00 (CEST)
- Postal codes: 23845
- Dialling codes: 04550
- Vehicle registration: SE
- Website: www.amt-trave- land.de

Wakendorf I is a municipality in the district of Segeberg, in Schleswig-Holstein, Germany. The name "Wakendorf I" was given in Prussian times, in order to distinguish it from another municipality 20 km to the southwest, also called Wakendorf.

== Geography and transport ==
Wakendorf I lies about 20 km south-southeast of the district capital Bad Segeberg and about six kilometers north of Bad Oldesloe near the Trave. It has a small train station on the Neumünster–Bad Oldesloe railway.
