= Klein Gladebrügge =

- Municipality
- Coat of arms

- Location of Klein Gladebrügge within Segeberg district
- Interactive map of Klein Gladebrügge
- Location within Germany Location within Schleswig-Holstein
- Coordinates: 53°55′N 10°19′E
- Country: Germany
- State: Schleswig-Holstein
- District: Segeberg
- Municipal assoc.: Trave-Land

Government
  - Mayor: Arne Hansen

Area
  - Total: 4.67 km^{2} (1.80 sq mi)
- Elevation: 39 m (128 ft)

Population (2025-12-31)
  - Total: 650
  - Density: 140/km^{2} (360/sq mi)
- Time zone: UTC+01:00 (CET)
  - Summer (DST): UTC+02:00 (CEST)
- Postal codes: 23795
- Dialling codes: 04551
- Vehicle registration: SE
- Website: www.klein-gladebruegge.de

Klein Gladebrügge is a municipality in the district of Segeberg, in Schleswig-Holstein, Germany.
