= Boostedt-Rickling =

- Amt
- Map of Segeberg highlighting Boostedt-Rickling
- Interactive map of Boostedt-Rickling
- Location within Germany Location within Schleswig-Holstein
- Coordinates: 54°01′N 10°10′E
- Country: Germany
- State: Schleswig-Holstein
- District: Segeberg
- Seat: Boostedt
- Subdivisions: 6 municipalities

Area
  - Total: 170.56 km^{2} (65.85 sq mi)

Population (2025-12-31)
  - Total: 12,454
  - Density: 73.018/km^{2} (189.12/sq mi)
- Time zone: UTC+01:00 (CET)
  - Summer (DST): UTC+02:00 (CEST)
- Website: www.amt-boostedt-rickling.de

Boostedt-Rickling is an Amt ("collective municipality") in the district of Segeberg, in Schleswig-Holstein, Germany. The seat of the Amt is in Boostedt. Before 1 January 2008, when Boostedt joined, the Amt was named Rickling, and the municipality Rickling was its seat.

The Amt Boostedt-Rickling consists of the following municipalities:

1. Boostedt
2. Daldorf
3. Groß Kummerfeld
4. Heidmühlen
5. Latendorf
6. Rickling
