= Rickling, Germany =

Rickling
- Municipality
- Coat of arms

- Location of Rickling within Segeberg district
- Interactive map of Rickling
- Location within Germany Location within Schleswig-Holstein
- Coordinates: 54°0′38″N 10°9′50″E
- Country: Germany
- State: Schleswig-Holstein
- District: Segeberg
- Municipal assoc.: Boostedt-Rickling

Government
  - Mayor: Keno Jantzen

Area
  - Total: 38.94 km^{2} (15.03 sq mi)
- Elevation: 36 m (118 ft)

Population (2025-12-31)
  - Total: 3,078
  - Density: 79.04/km^{2} (204.7/sq mi)
- Time zone: UTC+01:00 (CET)
  - Summer (DST): UTC+02:00 (CEST)
- Postal codes: 24635
- Dialling codes: 04328
- Vehicle registration: SE
- Website: www.amt-boostedt-rickling.de

Rickling is a municipality in the district of Segeberg, in Schleswig-Holstein, Germany. It is situated approximately 15 km southeast of Neumünster.

Rickling is part of the Amt ("collective municipality") Boostedt-Rickling.
