= Kisdorf =

- Municipality
- Coat of arms

- Location of Kisdorf within Segeberg district
- Interactive map of Kisdorf
- Location within Germany Location within Schleswig-Holstein
- Coordinates: 53°48′36″N 10°00′33″E
- Country: Germany
- State: Schleswig-Holstein
- District: Segeberg
- Municipal assoc.: Kisdorf

Government
  - Mayor: Birga Kreuzaler (CDU)

Area
  - Total: 24.52 km^{2} (9.47 sq mi)
- Elevation: 69 m (226 ft)

Population (2025-12-31)
  - Total: 3,960
  - Density: 162/km^{2} (418/sq mi)
- Time zone: UTC+01:00 (CET)
  - Summer (DST): UTC+02:00 (CEST)
- Postal codes: 24629
- Dialling codes: 04191, 04193, 04194, 04535
- Vehicle registration: SE
- Website: www.kisdorf.de

Kisdorf (Low German: Kisdörp) is a municipality in the district of Segeberg, in Schleswig-Holstein, Germany. It is situated approximately 30 km north of Hamburg, and 15 km north of Norderstedt. Kisdorf is part of the Amt ("collective municipality") Kisdorf. The seat of the Amt is in Kattendorf.

== People ==
- Ernst Barkmann, World War II panzer ace.
