= Wensin =

- Municipality
- Coat of arms

- Location of Wensin within Segeberg district
- Interactive map of Wensin
- Location within Germany Location within Schleswig-Holstein
- Coordinates: 53°58′N 10°25′E
- Country: Germany
- State: Schleswig-Holstein
- District: Segeberg
- Municipal assoc.: Trave-Land

Government
  - Mayor: Jörg Buthmann

Area
  - Total: 20.17 km^{2} (7.79 sq mi)
- Elevation: 26 m (85 ft)

Population (2025-12-31)
  - Total: 909
  - Density: 45.1/km^{2} (117/sq mi)
- Time zone: UTC+01:00 (CET)
  - Summer (DST): UTC+02:00 (CEST)
- Postal codes: 23827
- Dialling codes: 04559
- Vehicle registration: SE
- Website: www.amt-trave- land.de

Wensin is a municipality in the district of Segeberg, in Schleswig-Holstein, Germany.
