= Seth, Germany =

Seth
- Municipality
- Coat of arms

- Location of Seth within Segeberg district
- Interactive map of Seth
- Location within Germany Location within Schleswig-Holstein
- Coordinates: 53°51′N 10°10′E
- Country: Germany
- State: Schleswig-Holstein
- District: Segeberg
- Municipal assoc.: Itzstedt

Government
  - Mayor: Simon Herda (CDU)

Area
  - Total: 10.55 km^{2} (4.07 sq mi)
- Elevation: 34 m (112 ft)

Population (2025-12-31)
  - Total: 1,773
  - Density: 168.1/km^{2} (435.3/sq mi)
- Time zone: UTC+01:00 (CET)
  - Summer (DST): UTC+02:00 (CEST)
- Postal codes: 23845
- Dialling codes: 04194
- Vehicle registration: SE
- Website: www.amt-itzstedt.eu

Seth (German pronunciation: [zeːt]) is a municipality in the district of Segeberg, in Schleswig-Holstein, Germany.
