= Segeberg =

Coordinates: 53°55′N 10°10′E

- District
- Flag Coat of arms

- Country: Germany
- State: Schleswig-Holstein
- Capital: Bad Segeberg

Government
  - District admin.: Jan-Peter Schröder

Area
  - Total: 1,334 km^{2} (515 sq mi)

Population (31 December 2024)
  - Total: 283,562
  - Density: 212.6/km^{2} (550.5/sq mi)
- Time zone: UTC+01:00 (CET)
  - Summer (DST): UTC+02:00 (CEST)
- Vehicle registration: SE
- Website: kreis-segeberg.de

Segeberg (German pronunciation: [ˈzeːɡəˌbɛʁk]; North Frisian: Segebärj) is a district in Schleswig-Holstein, Germany. It is bounded by (from the southwest and clockwise) the districts of Pinneberg, Steinburg and Rendsburg-Eckernförde, the city of Neumünster, the districts of Plön, Ostholstein and Stormarn, and the city state of Hamburg.

== History ==
The history of the district is connected to the history of Holstein. In 1134, the castle of Segeberg was erected as a regional centre from where the reeve of Segeberg ruled. When Schleswig-Holstein became a Prussian province in 1865, the Prussian administration established the district of Segeberg.

Since then, the district has grown considerably twice: In 1932 parts of the dissolved district of Bordesholm joined the district; in 1970 the city of Norderstedt became part of the district.

== Geography ==
The district of Segeberg consists of the agricultural plains between the cities of Neumünster and Hamburg. A southwestern portion of the hilly lakeland called "Holsteinische Schweiz" (Holsatian Switzerland) belongs to the district, as well as some northern suburbs of Hamburg.

== Coat of arms ==
The coat of arms displays:

- four steeples forming a cross, commemorating the missionary activities of bishop Vizelin of Segeberg who Christianised Holstein in the early Middle Ages
- the heraldic nettle leaf of Holstein in the middle of the cross
- four green water lily leaves from the arms of Segeberg's reeves

== Towns and municipalities ==
Clickable map of towns and municipalities in the district

=== Independent towns and municipalities ===
1. Bad Bramstedt
2. Bad Segeberg
3. Kaltenkirchen
4. Norderstedt
5. Wahlstedt
6. Ellerau
7. Henstedt-Ulzburg

=== Ämter ===
1. Auenland Südholstein
  1. Alveslohe
  2. Hartenholm
  3. Hasenmoor
  4. Lentföhrden
  5. Nützen (Note: Seat of the Amt)
  6. Schmalfeld
2. Bad Bramstedt-Land (seat: Bad Bramstedt)
  1. Armstedt
  2. Bimöhlen
  3. Borstel
  4. Föhrden-Barl
  5. Fuhlendorf
  6. Großenaspe
  7. Hagen
  8. Hardebek
  9. Hasenkrug
  10. Heidmoor
  11. Hitzhusen
  12. Mönkloh
  13. Weddelbrook
  14. Wiemersdorf
3. Boostedt-Rickling
  1. Boostedt
  2. Daldorf
  3. Groß Kummerfeld
  4. Heidmühlen
  5. Latendorf
  6. Rickling
4. Bornhöved
  1. Bornhöved
  2. Damsdorf
  3. Gönnebek
  4. Schmalensee
  5. Stocksee
  6. Tarbek
  7. Tensfeld
  8. Trappenkamp
5. Itzstedt
  1. Itzstedt
  2. Kayhude
  3. Nahe
  4. Oering
  5. Seth
  6. Sülfeld
  7. Tangstedt (Stormarn district)
6. Kisdorf
  1. Hüttblek
  2. Kattendorf
  3. Kisdorf
  4. Oersdorf
  5. Sievershütten
  6. Struvenhütten
  7. Stuvenborn
  8. Wakendorf II
  9. Winsen
7. Leezen
  1. Bark
  2. Bebensee
  3. Fredesdorf
  4. Groß Niendorf
  5. Högersdorf
  6. Kükels
  7. Leezen
  8. Mözen
  9. Neversdorf
  10. Schwissel
  11. Todesfelde
  12. Wittenborn
8. Trave-Land (seat: Bad Segeberg)
  1. Bahrenhof
  2. Blunk
  3. Bühnsdorf
  4. Dreggers
  5. Fahrenkrug
  6. Geschendorf
  7. Glasau
  8. Groß Rönnau
  9. Klein Gladebrügge
  10. Klein Rönnau
  11. Krems II
  12. Negernbötel
  13. Nehms
  14. Neuengörs
  15. Pronstorf
  16. Rohlstorf
  17. Schackendorf
  18. Schieren
  19. Seedorf
  20. Stipsdorf
  21. Strukdorf
  22. Travenhorst
  23. Traventhal
  24. Wakendorf I
  25. Weede
  26. Wensin
  27. Westerrade

== Transport ==
Hamburger Verkehrsverbund

Segeberg district is located in the area of the transport association Hamburger Verkehrsverbund (HVV).
