= Kayhude =

- Municipality
- Coat of arms

- Location of Kayhude within Segeberg district
- Interactive map of Kayhude
- Location within Germany Location within Schleswig-Holstein
- Coordinates: 53°46′N 10°8′E
- Country: Germany
- State: Schleswig-Holstein
- District: Segeberg
- Municipal assoc.: Itzstedt

Government
  - Mayor: Bernhard Dwenger (CDU)

Area
  - Total: 5.25 km^{2} (2.03 sq mi)
- Elevation: 24 m (79 ft)

Population (2025-12-31)
  - Total: 1,171
  - Density: 223/km^{2} (578/sq mi)
- Time zone: UTC+01:00 (CET)
  - Summer (DST): UTC+02:00 (CEST)
- Postal codes: 23863
- Dialling codes: 04535, 040
- Vehicle registration: SE
- Website: www.amt-itzstedt.eu

Kayhude is a municipality in the district of Segeberg, in Schleswig-Holstein, Germany.
