= Leezen =

- Municipality
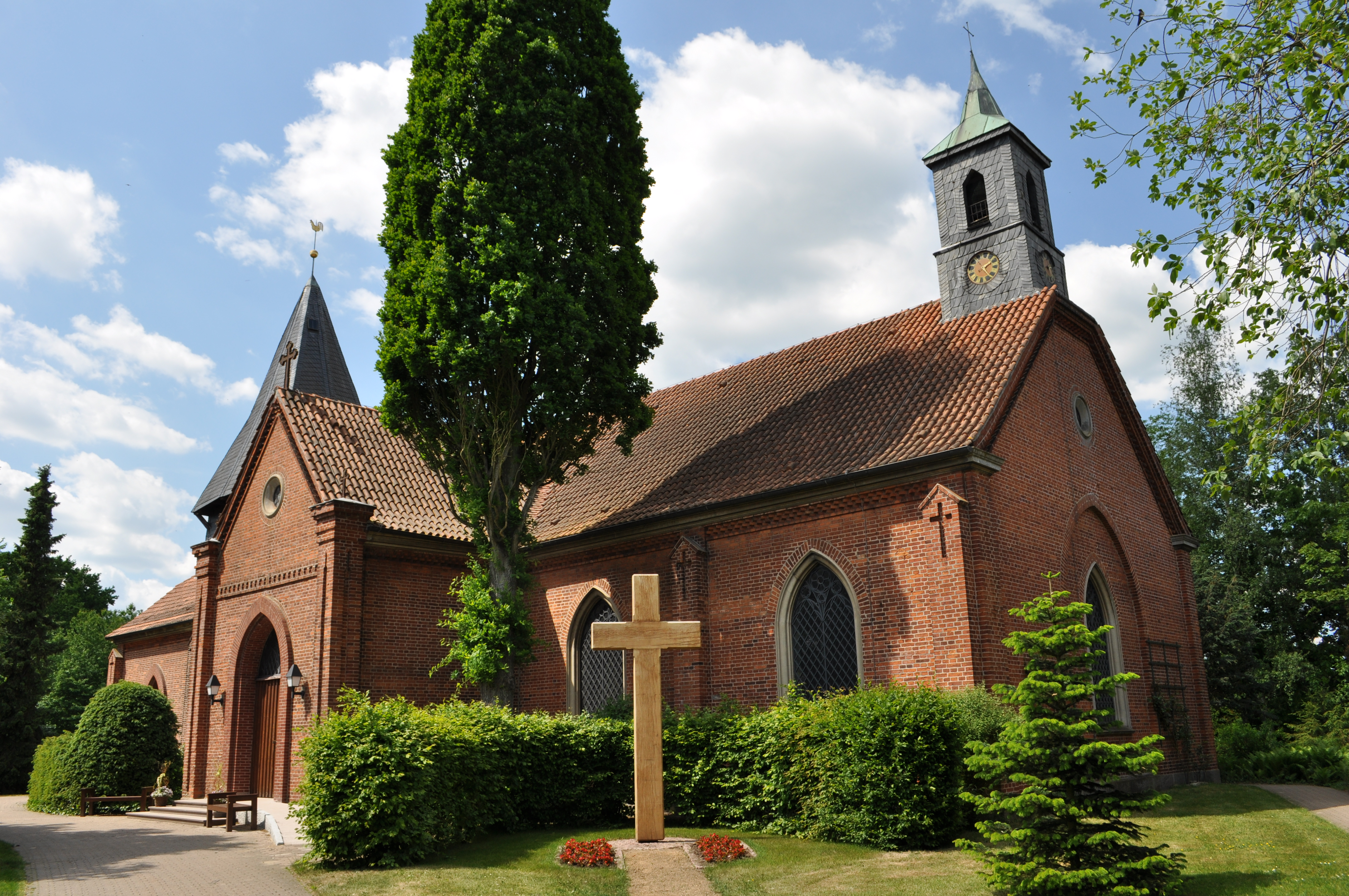
- Church in Leezen

- Coat of arms

- Location of Leezen within Segeberg district
- Interactive map of Leezen
- Location within Germany Location within Schleswig-Holstein
- Coordinates: 53°52′0″N 10°15′10″E
- Country: Germany
- State: Schleswig-Holstein
- District: Segeberg
- Municipal assoc.: Leezen
- Subdivisions: 3

Government
  - Mayor: Ulrich Schulz

Area
  - Total: 14.98 km^{2} (5.78 sq mi)
- Elevation: 29 m (95 ft)

Population (2025-12-31)
  - Total: 1,904
  - Density: 127.1/km^{2} (329.2/sq mi)
- Time zone: UTC+01:00 (CET)
  - Summer (DST): UTC+02:00 (CEST)
- Postal codes: 23816
- Dialling codes: 04552
- Vehicle registration: SE
- Website: https://leezen-sh.de/

Leezen (German pronunciation: [ˈleːtsn̩]) is a municipality in the district of Segeberg, in Schleswig-Holstein, Germany. It is situated approximately 40 km northeast of Hamburg, and 9 km southwest of Bad Segeberg.

Leezen is the seat of the Amt ("collective municipality") Leezen.
