= Nahe, Schleswig-Holstein =

Nahe
- Municipality
- Coat of arms

- Location of Nahe within Segeberg district
- Interactive map of Nahe
- Location within Germany Location within Schleswig-Holstein
- Coordinates: 53°47′58″N 10°8′35″E
- Country: Germany
- State: Schleswig-Holstein
- District: Segeberg
- Municipal assoc.: Itzstedt

Government
  - Mayor: Holger Fischer

Area
  - Total: 10.37 km^{2} (4.00 sq mi)
- Elevation: 38 m (125 ft)

Population (2025-12-31)
  - Total: 2,515
  - Density: 242.5/km^{2} (628.1/sq mi)
- Time zone: UTC+01:00 (CET)
  - Summer (DST): UTC+02:00 (CEST)
- Postal codes: 23866
- Dialling codes: 04535
- Vehicle registration: SE
- Website: www.gemeinde-nahe.de

Nahe (German pronunciation: [ˈnaːə]) is a municipality in the district of Segeberg, in Schleswig-Holstein, Germany.
