= Hagener Au =

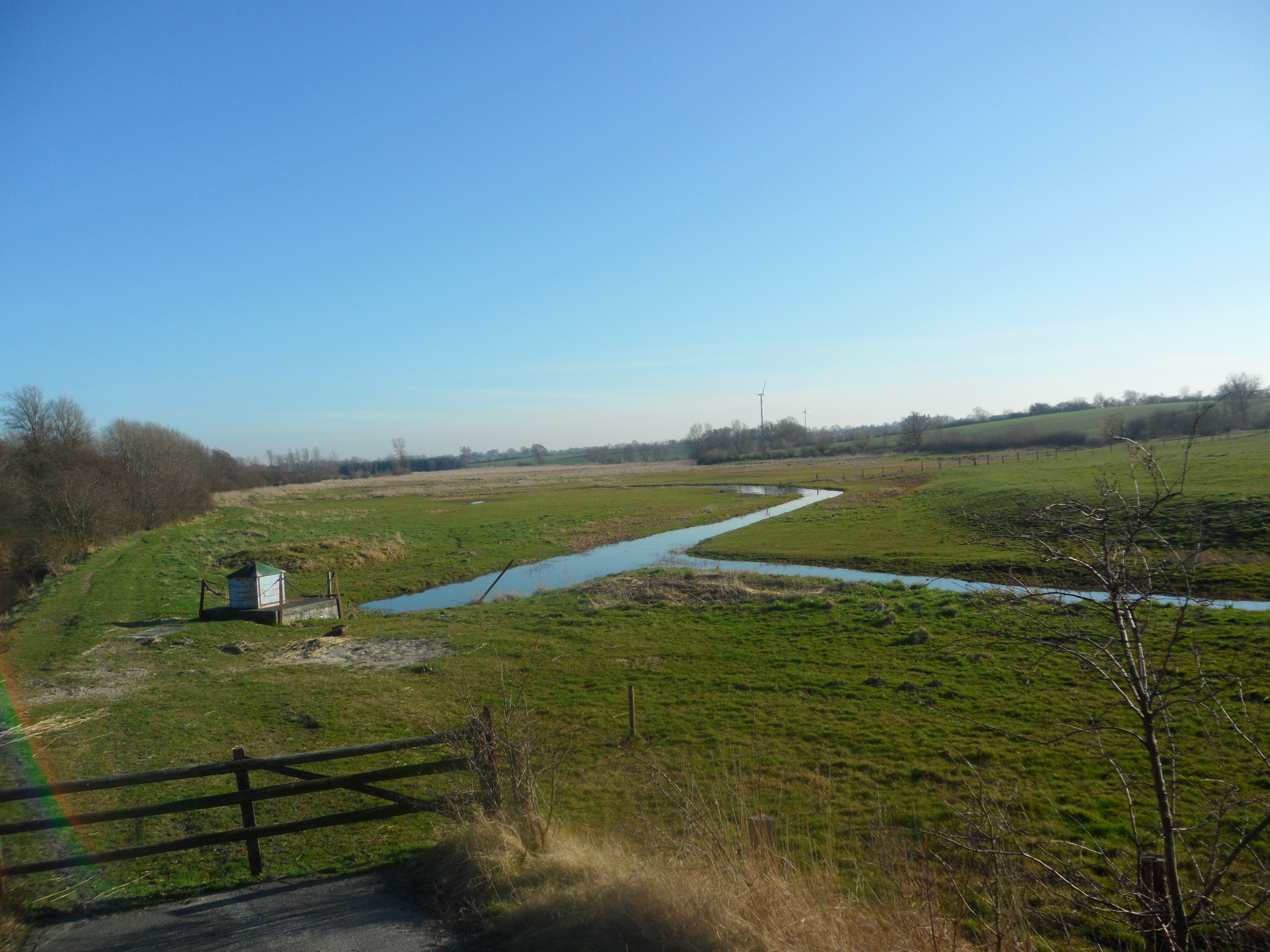
- Hagener Au and Auwiesen close to the mouth near the Baltic Sea

Location
- Country: Germany
- State: Schleswig-Holstein
- District: Plön
- Reference no.: DE: 965529

Physical characteristics
- Source
  - location: Source: Passader See
  - coordinates: 54°20′26″N 10°18′19″E
- Mouth
  - location: Kiel Fjord between Laboe and Stein
  - coordinates: 54°24′59″N 10°14′32″E
- Length: 10 km

Basin features
- Landmarks: Villages: Probsteierhagen, Lutterbek, Stein

The Hagener Au (German pronunciation: [ˈhaːɡənɐ ˈaʊ̯]) is a stream, roughly 10 kilometres (6.2 mi) long, in the district of Plön in the north German state of Schleswig-Holstein. It is an outlet of the Passader See. From the lake's southwestern bay the stream flows in a northerly direction and discharges between Laboe and Stein in the Baltic Sea.

Sections of the Hagener Au are very natural and surrounded by wetlands. In addition the stream is a habitat for the rare spined loach. The stream has been straightened near its mouth and the last 50 metres (160 ft) runs through a pipe. Together with the Passader See the Hagener Au is a protected Special Area of Conservation.

== See also ==
- List of rivers of Schleswig-Holstein
