= Schönkirchen =

- Municipality
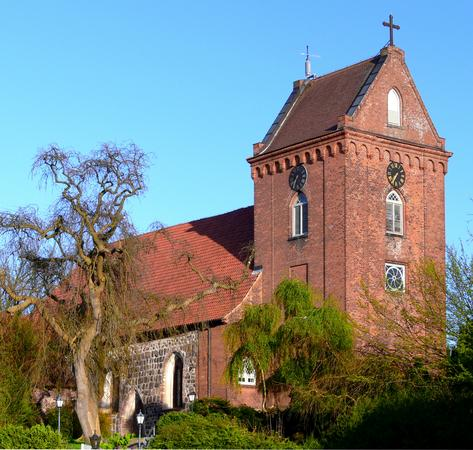
- St Mary's Church in Schönkirchen

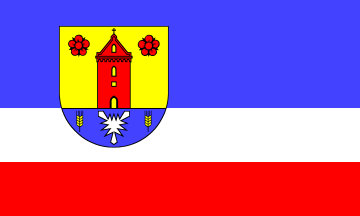
- Flag Coat of arms

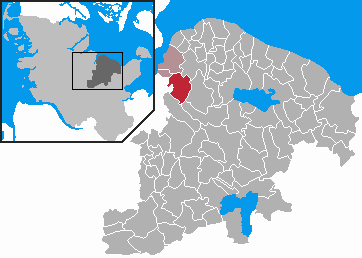
- Location of Schönkirchen within Plön district
- Interactive map of Schönkirchen
- Location within Germany Location within Schleswig-Holstein
- Coordinates: 54°20′30″N 10°13′27″E
- Country: Germany
- State: Schleswig-Holstein
- District: Plön
- Municipal assoc.: Schrevenborn

Government
  - Mayor: Gerd F. Radisch (Ind.)

Area
  - Total: 16.02 km^{2} (6.19 sq mi)
- Elevation: 27 m (89 ft)

Population (2025-12-31)
  - Total: 6,774
  - Density: 422.8/km^{2} (1,095/sq mi)
- Time zone: UTC+01:00 (CET)
  - Summer (DST): UTC+02:00 (CEST)
- Postal codes: 24232
- Dialling codes: 0431, 04348
- Vehicle registration: PLÖ
- Website: www.amt- schrevenborn.de

Schönkirchen is a municipality in the district of Plön, in Schleswig-Holstein, Germany.

== Location and transport ==
Schönkirchen is located close to Kiel at the Bundesstraße 502 connecting Kiel and Schönberg (Holstein) and at the Kiel-Schönberg-Railroad. The closest main line train station is Kiel Central. Although Schönkirchen has access to the Schwentine river, passenger traffic (to Gothenburg and Oslo) and freight transport have to use the port of Kiel.

== History ==
After the Wendish Crusade the German colonisation arrived in the Schönkirchen area in the early 13th century. The village was first mentioned in a 1294 deed, the Codex Cismariensis.

Count John II had been the patron of the local church and the surrounding village, but was forced to assign the village in a deed of separation of 7 February 1316 to his Grand-nephew John III. After this Schönkirchen was allodial title property of the counts of Kiel and the villagers had to pay their duties to the Kiel castle. Later on the village became a leasehold estate leased out to a succession of noble lessees. In 1356 Schönkirchen was sold to the Kiel Heiligengeist monastery (monastery of the Holy Spirit) and remained in its possession for the next 200 years.

The administration including the patrimonial jurisdiction of the monastery's villages was held by the city council of Kiel, which was obliged to use the income for the almshouses and infirmaries associated with the monastery and for other godly purposes. Since the city council failed to fulfil these obligations properly complaints to the city and the duke got frequent over the years.

Following the death of king Frederick I of Denmark several partitions of Schleswig-Holstein occurred - in the one of 9 August 1544 Kiel and its surrounding villages were ceded to the dukes of Schleswig-Holstein-Gottorf, but duke Adolf I could make the Kiel city council comply with the distribution rules for the income derived from Schönkirchen only after an intervention of emperor Maximilian II. After this the village had to pay its duties to the city of Kiel until the 18th century - at last the annual contribution amounted to 10 Reichsthaler and 45 Schillings payable to the Kiel St. Niclas' Church as well as wood for the schools and the organists in Kiel.

Schönkirchen was a poor village with poor soil conditions, so that the local trade remained as small as the local peasants. Better to cope with the damages of frequent fires the Fire- and Church Guild of 1560 for mutual assistance and support amongst the villagers was founded.

Together with the rest of Schleswig-Holstein-Gottorf the village fell under frequent change of rule. After being resigned by empress Catherine II of Russia to Denmark at the end of the 18th century Holstein came under joint austro-prussian administration after the Second Schleswig War in 1864 until both powers abandoned this condominium in the Gastein Convention and the Austrian Empire got sole control of Holstein in 1865. But in 1866 Austria lost the Austro-Prussian War and had to surrender its Holstein possessions to the Kingdom of Prussia that merged its duchies of Schleswig and Holstein to the prussian Province of Schleswig-Holstein.

The neighboring Kiel in 1867 was declared Baltic Naval Station of the North German Confederation and later of the German Empire in 1871. This resulted in the set up of businesses like the Imperial Shipyard Kiel and its ancillary and supply industries, e.g. foundries, dockyards and other defence industries. The factories' demand for workers led to a rapid increase in population in the city of Kiel but also in the villages in its vicinity such as Schönkirchen.

During World War I the workers had to perform extra shifts at the shipyards without receiving extra food rations. The women, children and the aged at the homesteads had a lot of trouble to till the fields and reap the harvests. 64 men from Schönkirchen died in the hostilities at the front.

In the years of the Weimar Republic the villagers had to endure the 1920s German inflation and the Great Depression at the end of the decade. Just as in other parts of Schleswig-Holstein the promises of the NSDAP could attract voters at an early stage of its rise to power. Shortly after Adolf Hitler seized power on 31 January 1933 the factories in Kiel started to produce arms again quickly and were in need of workers. The defence companies also put up industrial residential centres for its workforce in Schönkirchen such as the Anschützwerke (Anschützsiedlung) or Deutsche Werke shipyards (Kalkstein, Kemmecken).

As the military industry changed into higher gear before World War II several workers camps were set up in Schönkirchen for the various defence companies such as Howaldtswerke-Deutsche Werft, Feinmechanische Werke and other military suppliers. At the beginning these camps were inhabited by Reichsarbeitsdienst members but after the start of World War II increasingly foreign workers (Fremdarbeiter) were placed in there. To defend nearby Kiel and its military industry some anti-aircraft units were installed on the municipal territory. Nonetheless several airstrikes caused heavy civilian collateral damage in Schönkirchen, too.

After the war many refugees, bombed out and displaced persons sought accommodation. At first the former workers camps were used until residential buildings were completed in the village (Brammerkamp, Augustental/Schönberger Landstraße, Haferberg). To prevent Schönkirchen to become a sheer dormitory village - in 1951 70% of all the resident working inhabitants did so at the Howaldtswerke-Deutsche Werft shipyard - in 1967 the development of Söhren business park started.

== See also ==
- Schönhorst
