= Jarbek =

Location
- Country: Germany
- States: Schleswig-Holstein

Physical characteristics
- Mouth
  - location: Passader See
  - coordinates: 54.3376°N 10.3074°E

Basin features
- Progression: Hagener Au→ Baltic Sea

Jarbek is a river of Schleswig-Holstein, Germany. It is the outflow of the Dobersdorfer See. It flows into the Passader See, which is drained by the Hagener Au.

== See also ==
- List of rivers of Schleswig-Holstein
