= Wisch =

Wisch may refer to:

== Places ==
- Wisch, Gelderland, a former municipality in Gelderland, the Netherlands
- Wisch, Nordfriesland, a municipality in the district of Nordfriesland, Schleswig-Holstein, Germany
- Wisch, Plön, a municipality in the district of Plön, Schleswig-Holstein, Germany

== People ==
- Theodor Wisch, World War II German Waffen-SS general
