= Klausdorf =

- Village of Schwentinental
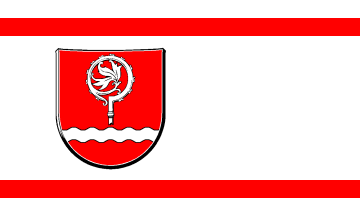
- Flag Coat of arms

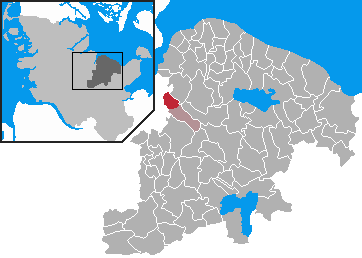
- Location of Klausdorf within the district of Plön
- Interactive map of Klausdorf
- Location within Germany Location within Schleswig-Holstein
- Coordinates: 54°19′N 10°13′E
- Country: Germany
- State: Schleswig-Holstein
- District: Plön
- Town: Schwentinental

Area
  - Total: 6.52 km^{2} (2.52 sq mi)
- Elevation: 14 m (46 ft)

Population (2006-12-31)
  - Total: 6,006
  - Density: 921/km^{2} (2,390/sq mi)
- Time zone: UTC+01:00 (CET)
  - Summer (DST): UTC+02:00 (CEST)
- Postal codes: 24147
- Dialling codes: 0431
- Vehicle registration: PLÖ
- Website: www.klausdorf.de

Klausdorf (German pronunciation: [ˈklaʊsˌdɔʁf]) is a former municipality in the district of Plön, in Schleswig-Holstein, Germany. It is situated approximately 20 km northwest of Plön, and 5 km east of Kiel. On 1 March 2008, it was merged with Raisdorf to form the town Schwentinental.
