= Anke Eymer =

German politician

Member of the Bundestag
- In office 1990–2009

Personal details
- Born: 12 April 1949 (age 76) Fiefbergen, West Germany (now Germany)
- Party: CDU
- Children: 1

Anke Eymer (born 12 April 1949) is a German politician of the Christian Democratic Union (CDU) and former member of the German Bundestag.

== Life ==
She was a member of the German Bundestag from 1990 to 2009. As a member of the German Bundestag, she was a member of the Committee on Women and Youth, the Committee on Family and Senior Citizens and later a member of the Committee on Foreign Affairs, rapporteur for international women's policy, international cultural policy and for sub-Saharan Africa.
