= Schönberg, Plön =

Schönberg
- Municipality
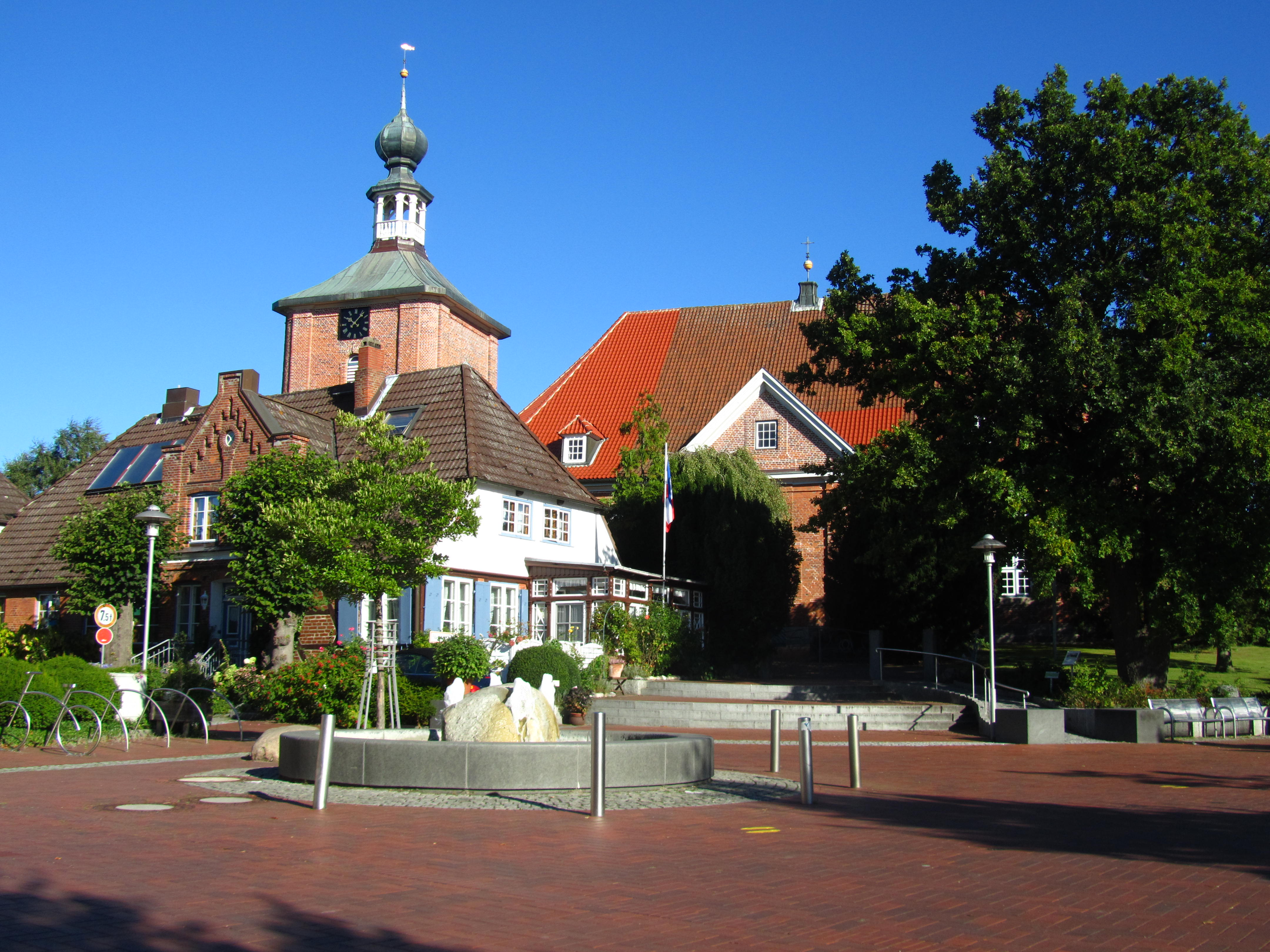
- Markt (central square) and church

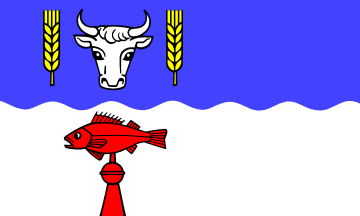
- Flag Coat of arms

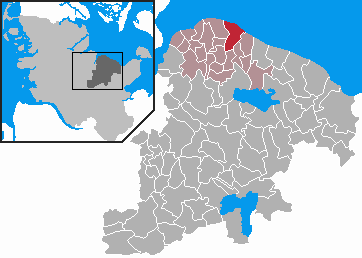
- Location of Schönberg within Plön district
- Interactive map of Schönberg
- Location within Germany Location within Schleswig-Holstein
- Coordinates: 54°23′44″N 10°22′19″E
- Country: Germany
- State: Schleswig-Holstein
- District: Plön
- Municipal assoc.: Probstei

Government
  - Mayor: Peter Kokocinski (SPD)

Area
  - Total: 11.63 km^{2} (4.49 sq mi)
- Elevation: 11 m (36 ft)

Population (2025-12-31)
  - Total: 6,159
  - Density: 529.6/km^{2} (1,372/sq mi)
- Time zone: UTC+01:00 (CET)
  - Summer (DST): UTC+02:00 (CEST)
- Postal codes: 24217
- Dialling codes: 04344
- Vehicle registration: PLÖ
- Website: www.schoenberg.de

Schönberg (German pronunciation: [ˈʃøːnbɛʁk]) is a municipality in the district of Plön, in Schleswig-Holstein, Germany. It is situated on the Ostsee coast, approx. 17 km northeast of the state capital Kiel, and 26 km north of Plön. The formerly unincorporated town became a part of the Probstei district on January 1, 2008, which already had its seat in Schönberg.

Schönberg, Neuschönberg, Schönberger Strand, Brasilien (meaning 'Brazil'), Kalifornien (meaning 'California') and Holm lie in the municipality. The names Brasilien and Kalifornien go back to the traditional names of the beaches. The name Kalifornien arose because of a piece of a ship which washed up on the shore, bearing the name.

== History ==
Earlier Schönberg was called Sconeberg, which means beautiful hill. In 1226 the Count of Schauenberg Adolf IV gave the northern part of the modern-day district of Plön to the cloister of the Benedictian Order in Preetz. This area was named Probstei, because it was under the administration of the provost of the cloister (in German: Propst). Between 1245 and 1250, the Provost of the cloister, Friedrich, grounded the town Sconeberg. Before that, there was most likely Slavic settlers. A large part of the inhabitants of the village were farm hands. It was characteristic of the Probstei Farmers that they were free men, and not feudal serfs; they only needed to pay tributes to the cloister.

The town was protected by a palisade wall. There were two gates, to the south, in the direction of Preetz, was the "Höhndorfer Gate" and to the east, in the direction of Feldmark the "Stakendorfer Gate".

The first sacred building in the town was Saint George's Chapel (built in 1220), west of Wisch, Plön. The chapel was destroyed during a storm which caused coastal flooding. The baptismal fond of the chapel is now located in the tower of the Lutheran church.

In 1600, the number of inhabitants was between 350 and 400.

On February 10, 1625 a coastal flooding raged over Probstei. This was devastating for the inhabitants, because, at the time, there were no levees on the beach.

In the night from August 2 to 3 in 1779, A large part of the village was consumed by fire, including the Lutheran church, which was probably made of wood. The reconstruction was able to begin fairly rapidly thanks to donations from the Barsbek farmers. The barocke church which stands there today was dedicated on September 22, 1782. The leading architect was the Official construction master in the Lands of Kiel, Johann Adam Richter, a student of Ernst Georg Sonnin (an important architect and engineer from Hamburg). The Schönberg Church was his Journeyman's piece, and the church in Kappeln was his masterpiece. The similarities of the two churches are very obvious, among other things the similarities between the two facades. As a thank you for the support of the Barsbek Farmers, a perch (the symbol of Barsbek) was used as a weather vane rather than the usual rooster.

A storm in 1872 caused so much damage that a solid dike was installed from 1880 to 1882.

== Twinnings ==
- Älvdalen, Sweden
- Haljala Parish, Estonia (since 1992)
- (United States) Eldridge, Iowa, USA (since 2000)

Before and after the First World War, numerous residents of Schönberg and the Probstei emigrated to Eldridge and Davenport, the neighboring large city in the US state of Iowa. Even today, there are many family connections in this region.
