= Raisdorf =

- Village of Schwentinental
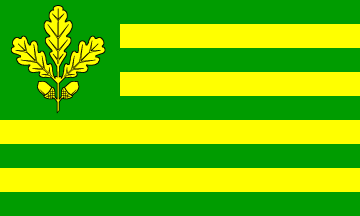
- Flag Coat of arms

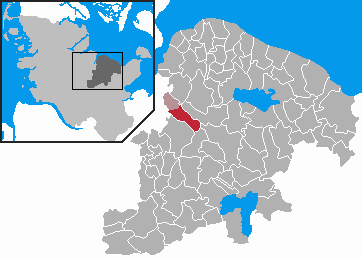
- Location of Raisdorf within the district of Plön
- Interactive map of Raisdorf
- Location within Germany Location within Schleswig-Holstein
- Coordinates: 54°16′N 10°13′E
- Country: Germany
- State: Schleswig-Holstein
- District: Plön
- Town: Schwentinental

Area
  - Total: 11.29 km^{2} (4.36 sq mi)
- Elevation: 36 m (118 ft)

Population (2006-12-31)
  - Total: 7,641
  - Density: 676.8/km^{2} (1,753/sq mi)
- Time zone: UTC+01:00 (CET)
  - Summer (DST): UTC+02:00 (CEST)
- Postal codes: 24223
- Dialling codes: 04307, 04342
- Vehicle registration: PLÖ
- Website: www.raisdorf.de

Raisdorf (German pronunciation: [ˈʁaɪsˌdɔʁf]) is a former municipality in the district of Plön, in Schleswig-Holstein, Germany. It is situated approximately 9 km southeast of Kiel. Until 2003 it was twinned with Uttoxeter, United Kingdom. On 1 March 2008, it was merged with Klausdorf to form the town Schwentinental.
