= Helmstorf =

Helmstorf is the name of several northern German towns and villages and may refer to:

- Helmstorf, Schleswig-Holstein
- Helmstorf, Mecklenburg-Vorpommern
- Helmstorf, Niedersachsen, now a part of the Seevetal municipality.
