= Passader See =

Lake in Schleswig-Holstein, Germany

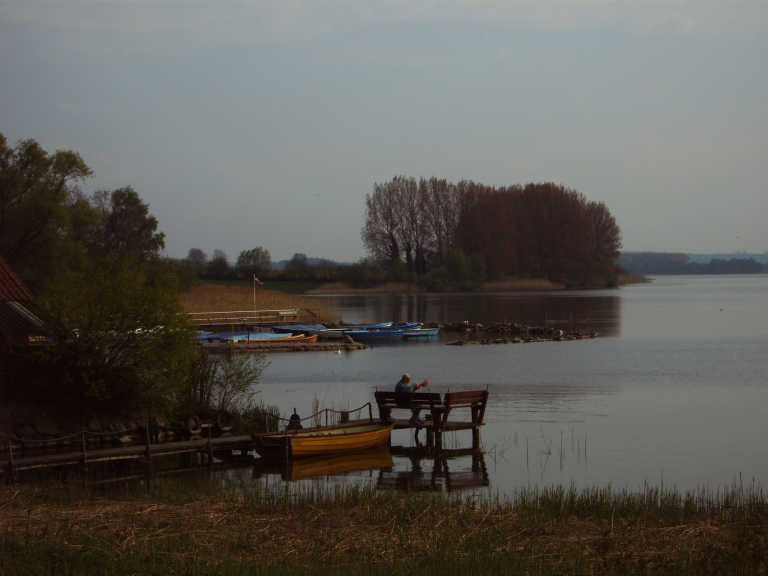

- Location within Schleswig-Holstein
- Location: Eastern Schleswig-Holstein
- Coordinates: 54°20′56″N 10°19′8″E
- Primary inflows: Salzau, Jarbek
- Primary outflows: Hagener Au
- Basin countries: Germany
- Surface area: 2.7 km^{2} (1.0 sq mi)
- Max. depth: 10.7 m (35 ft)
- Shore length^{1}: 12 km (7.5 mi)
- Surface elevation: 18.8 m (62 ft)
- ^{1} Shore length is not a well-defined measure.

Passader See is a lake in Eastern Schleswig-Holstein, Germany. At an elevation of 18,8 m, its surface area is 2.7 km².
