= Rathjensdorf =

- Municipality
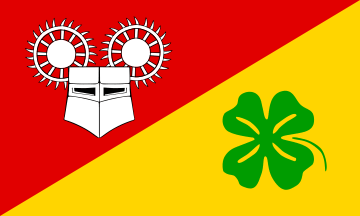
- Flag Coat of arms

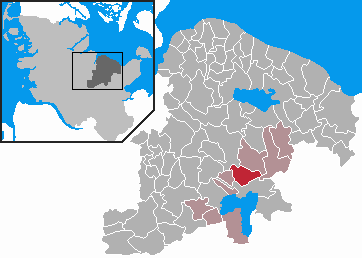
- Location of Rathjensdorf within Plön district
- Interactive map of Rathjensdorf
- Location within Germany Location within Schleswig-Holstein
- Coordinates: 54°10′N 10°25′E
- Country: Germany
- State: Schleswig-Holstein
- District: Plön
- Municipal assoc.: Großer Plöner See

Government
  - Mayor: Oskar Paustian

Area
  - Total: 11.79 km^{2} (4.55 sq mi)
- Elevation: 32 m (105 ft)

Population (2025-12-31)
  - Total: 449
  - Density: 38.1/km^{2} (98.6/sq mi)
- Time zone: UTC+01:00 (CET)
  - Summer (DST): UTC+02:00 (CEST)
- Postal codes: 24306
- Dialling codes: 04522
- Vehicle registration: PLÖ
- Website: www.amt-grosser- ploener-see.de

Rathjensdorf is a municipality in the district of Plön, in Schleswig-Holstein, Germany.
