= Kalübbe =

- Municipality
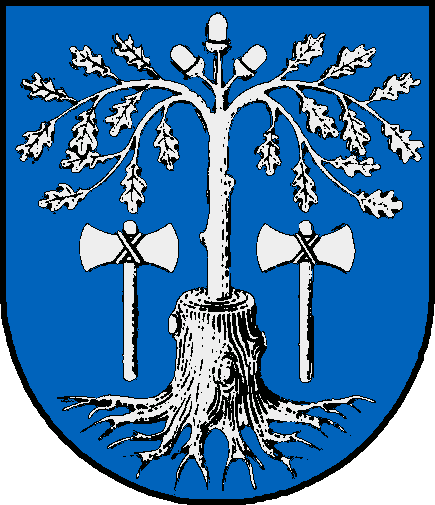
- Coat of arms

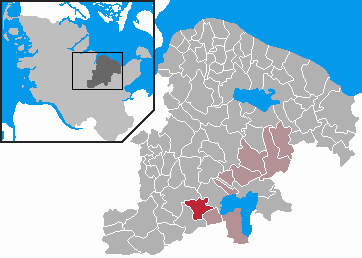
- Location of Kalübbe within Plön district
- Interactive map of Kalübbe
- Location within Germany Location within Schleswig-Holstein
- Coordinates: 54°7′N 10°17′E
- Country: Germany
- State: Schleswig-Holstein
- District: Plön
- Municipal assoc.: Großer Plöner See

Government
  - Mayor: Barbara Semleith

Area
  - Total: 11.8 km^{2} (4.6 sq mi)
- Elevation: 44 m (144 ft)

Population (2025-12-31)
  - Total: 568
  - Density: 48.1/km^{2} (125/sq mi)
- Time zone: UTC+01:00 (CET)
  - Summer (DST): UTC+02:00 (CEST)
- Postal codes: 24326
- Dialling codes: 04526
- Vehicle registration: PLÖ
- Website: www.amt-grosser- ploener-see.de

Kalübbe is a municipality in the district of Plön, in Schleswig-Holstein, Germany.
