= Krummbek =

- Municipality
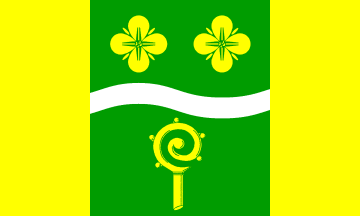
- Flag Coat of arms

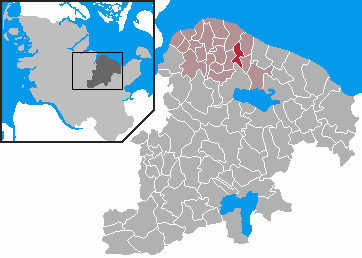
- Location of Krummbek within Plön district
- Interactive map of Krummbek
- Location within Germany Location within Schleswig-Holstein
- Coordinates: 54°23′N 10°24′E
- Country: Germany
- State: Schleswig-Holstein
- District: Plön
- Municipal assoc.: Probstei

Government
  - Mayor: Brigitte Vöge-Lesky

Area
  - Total: 5.48 km^{2} (2.12 sq mi)
- Elevation: 15 m (49 ft)

Population (2025-12-31)
  - Total: 383
  - Density: 69.9/km^{2} (181/sq mi)
- Time zone: UTC+01:00 (CET)
  - Summer (DST): UTC+02:00 (CEST)
- Postal codes: 24217
- Dialling codes: 04344
- Vehicle registration: PLÖ
- Website: www.amt-probstei.de

Krummbek is a municipality in the district of Plön, in Schleswig-Holstein, Germany.
