= Dannau =

- Municipality
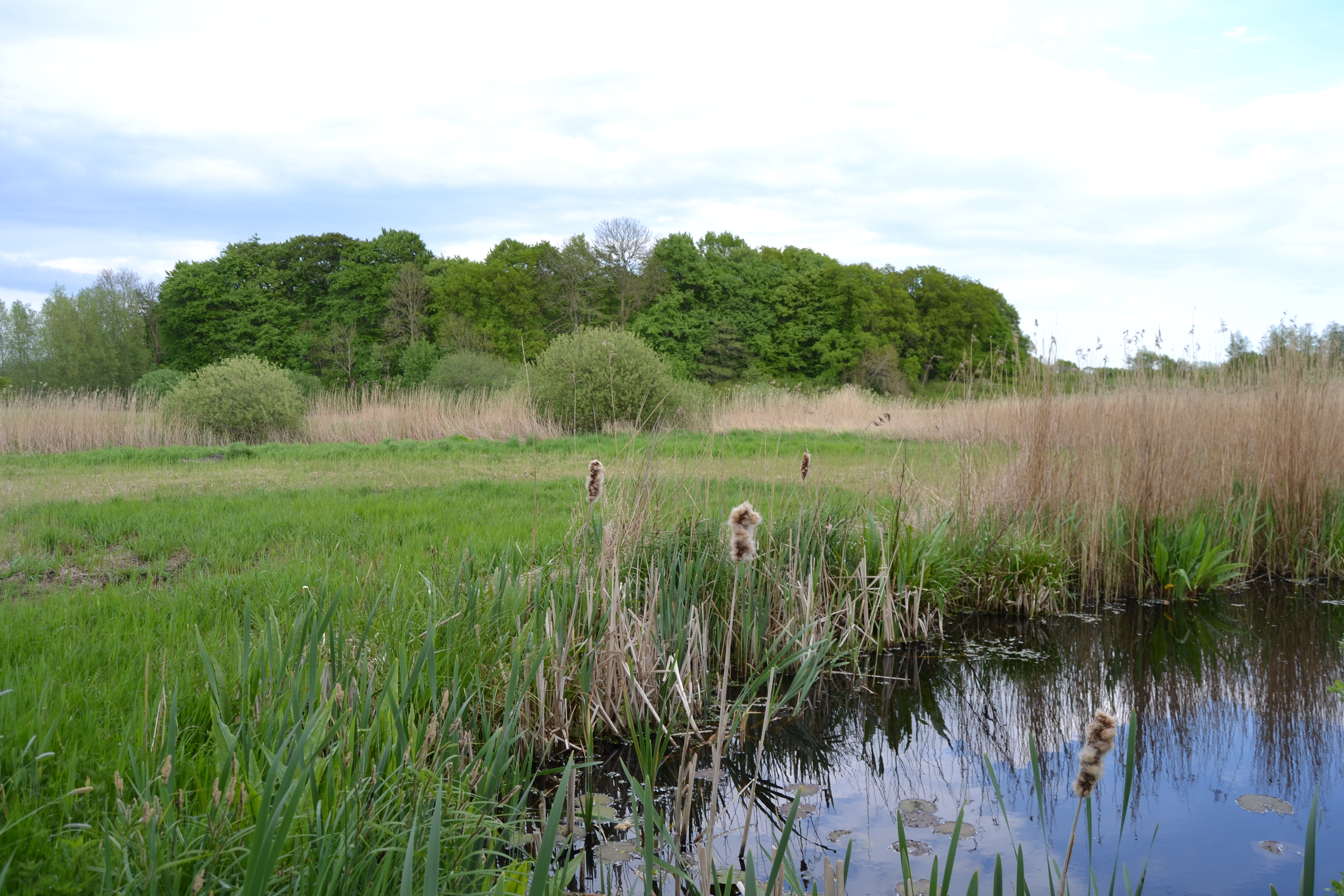
- Nature reserve Dannauer See und Umgebung in Dannau

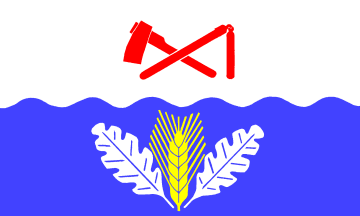
- Flag Coat of arms

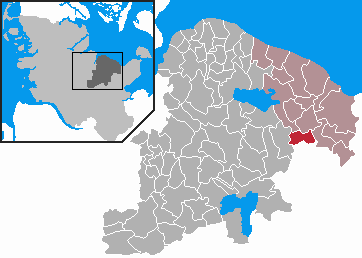
- Location of Dannau within Plön district
- Interactive map of Dannau
- Location within Germany Location within Schleswig-Holstein
- Coordinates: 54°15′N 10°31′E
- Country: Germany
- State: Schleswig-Holstein
- District: Plön
- Municipal assoc.: Lütjenburg

Government
  - Mayor: Roland Feichtner

Area
  - Total: 9.12 km^{2} (3.52 sq mi)
- Elevation: 38 m (125 ft)

Population (2025-12-31)
  - Total: 578
  - Density: 63.4/km^{2} (164/sq mi)
- Time zone: UTC+01:00 (CET)
  - Summer (DST): UTC+02:00 (CEST)
- Postal codes: 24329
- Dialling codes: 04383
- Vehicle registration: PLÖ

Dannau is a municipality in the district of Plön, in Schleswig-Holstein, Germany.
