= Stakendorf =

- Municipality
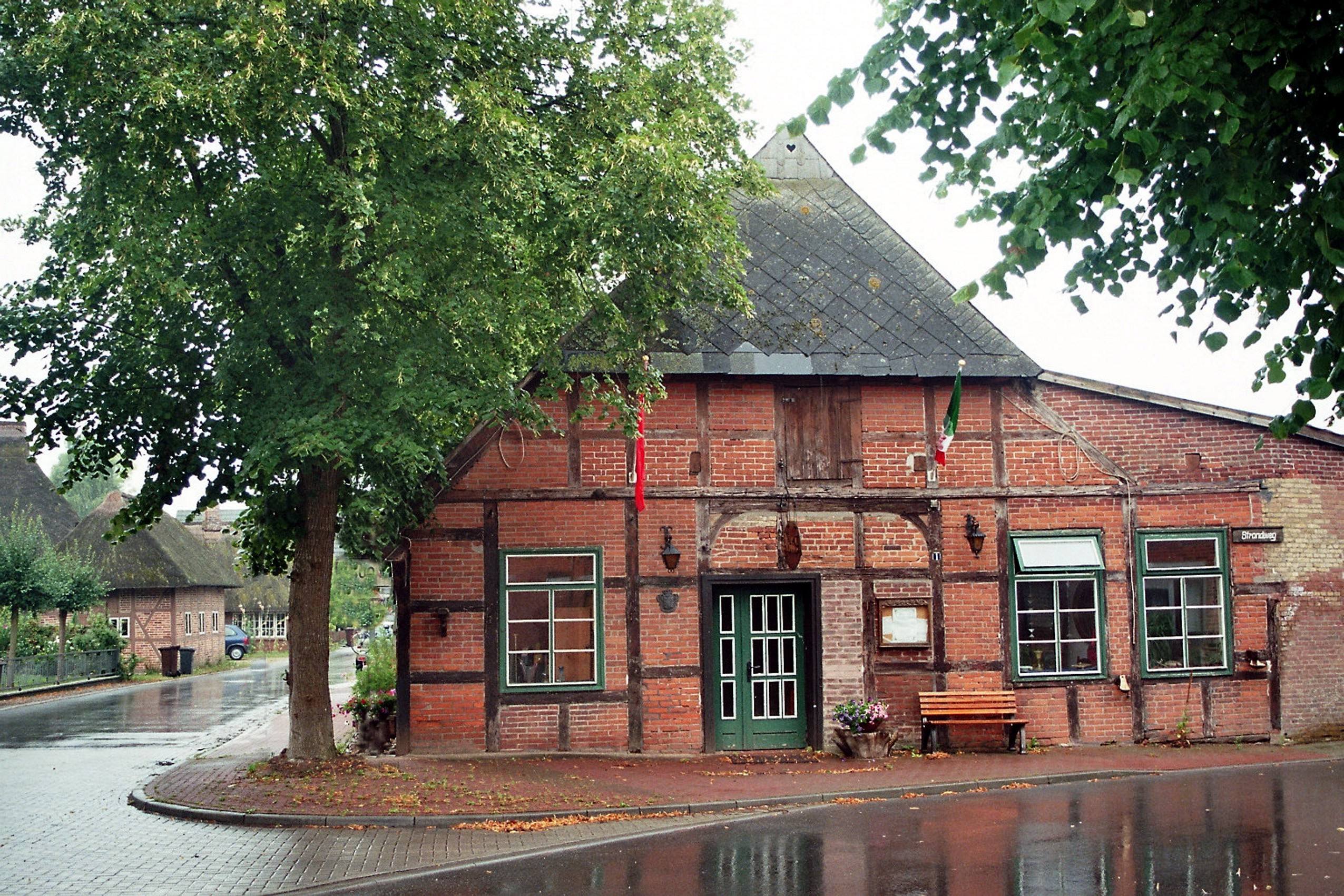

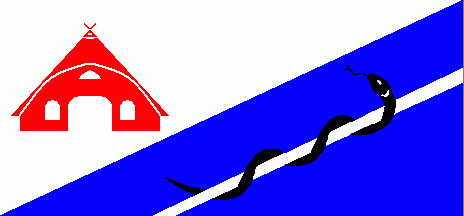
- Flag Coat of arms

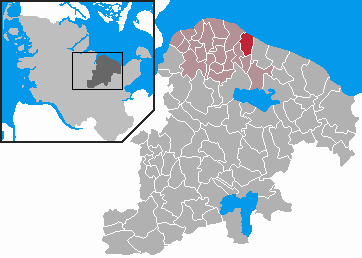
- Location of Stakendorf within Plön district
- Interactive map of Stakendorf
- Location within Germany Location within Schleswig-Holstein
- Coordinates: 54°23′26″N 10°25′21″E
- Country: Germany
- State: Schleswig-Holstein
- District: Plön
- Municipal assoc.: Probstei

Government
  - Mayor: Ernst Hansen

Area
  - Total: 7.97 km^{2} (3.08 sq mi)
- Elevation: 25 m (82 ft)

Population (2025-12-31)
  - Total: 488
  - Density: 61.2/km^{2} (159/sq mi)
- Time zone: UTC+01:00 (CET)
  - Summer (DST): UTC+02:00 (CEST)
- Postal codes: 24217
- Dialling codes: 04344
- Vehicle registration: PLÖ
- Website: www.stakendorf.de

Stakendorf is a municipality in the district of Plön, in Schleswig-Holstein, Germany.
