= Schrevenborn =

- Amt
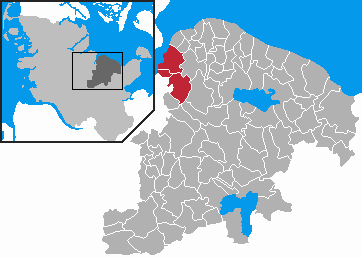
- Map of Plön highlighting Schrevenborn
- Interactive map of Schrevenborn
- Location within Germany Location within Schleswig-Holstein
- Coordinates: 54°22′N 10°12′E
- Country: Germany
- State: Schleswig-Holstein
- District: Plön
- Seat: Heikendorf
- Subdivisions: 3 municipalities

Government
  - Mayor: Ina Schultheiß (CDU)

Area
  - Total: 33.46 km^{2} (12.92 sq mi)

Population (2025-12-31)
  - Total: 19,094
  - Density: 570.7/km^{2} (1,478/sq mi)
- Time zone: UTC+01:00 (CET)
  - Summer (DST): UTC+02:00 (CEST)
- Website: www.amt-schrevenborn.de

Schrevenborn is an Amt ("collective municipality") in the district of Plön, in Schleswig-Holstein, Germany. It is situated directly northeast of Kiel. The seat of the Amt is in Heikendorf.

The Amt Schrevenborn consists of the following municipalities:

1. Heikendorf
2. Mönkeberg
3. Schönkirchen
