= Höhndorf =

- Municipality
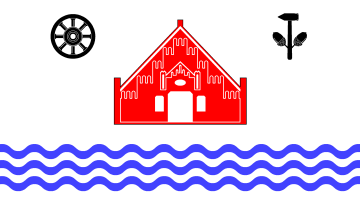
- Flag Coat of arms

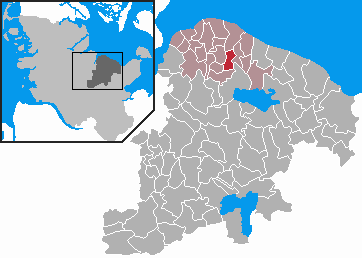
- Location of Höhndorf within Plön district
- Interactive map of Höhndorf
- Location within Germany Location within Schleswig-Holstein
- Coordinates: 54°22′N 10°22′E
- Country: Germany
- State: Schleswig-Holstein
- District: Plön
- Municipal assoc.: Probstei

Government
  - Mayor: Marco Eck

Area
  - Total: 5.63 km^{2} (2.17 sq mi)
- Elevation: 42 m (138 ft)

Population (2025-12-31)
  - Total: 467
  - Density: 82.9/km^{2} (215/sq mi)
- Time zone: UTC+01:00 (CET)
  - Summer (DST): UTC+02:00 (CEST)
- Postal codes: 24217
- Dialling codes: 04344
- Vehicle registration: PLÖ
- Website: www.amt-probstei.de

Höhndorf is a municipality in the district of Plön, in Schleswig-Holstein, Germany.

== See also ==
- Walter Höhndorf
