= Passade =

- Municipality
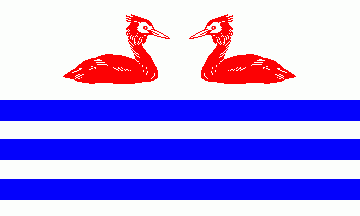
- Flag Coat of arms

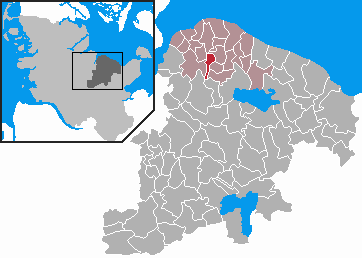
- Location of Passade within Plön district
- Interactive map of Passade
- Location within Germany Location within Schleswig-Holstein
- Coordinates: 54°22′N 10°19′E
- Country: Germany
- State: Schleswig-Holstein
- District: Plön
- Municipal assoc.: Probstei

Government
  - Mayor: Gerd Rönnau

Area
  - Total: 4.32 km^{2} (1.67 sq mi)
- Elevation: 29 m (95 ft)

Population (2025-12-31)
  - Total: 357
  - Density: 82.6/km^{2} (214/sq mi)
- Time zone: UTC+01:00 (CET)
  - Summer (DST): UTC+02:00 (CEST)
- Postal codes: 24253
- Dialling codes: 04344
- Vehicle registration: PLÖ
- Website: passade.de

Passade is a municipality in the district of Plön, in Schleswig-Holstein, Germany. Passade was first mentioned in 1373. The picturesque location and the intact village structure was appreciated in 2003 with the first prize in the competition "Unser Dorf soll schöner werden". In 2004, the award was appropriated at federal level.

Passade, located in the fertile Probstei, is still dominated by agriculture. There are five full-time farms, including an organic farm with a bakery (Passader Backhaus) and a dairy farm. The company ecoTec Tobias Ain, a provider of specialty chemical and biological products, has its headquarters in Passade.
