= Stoltenberg =

- Municipality
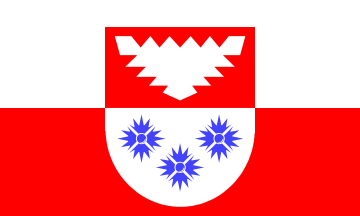
- Flag Coat of arms

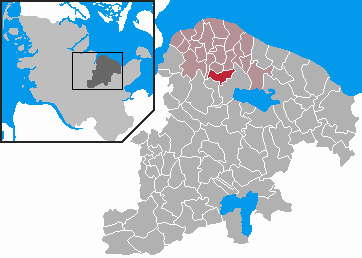
- Location of Stoltenberg within Plön district
- Interactive map of Stoltenberg
- Location within Germany Location within Schleswig-Holstein
- Coordinates: 54°20′40″N 10°20′50″E
- Country: Germany
- State: Schleswig-Holstein
- District: Plön
- Municipal assoc.: Probstei

Government
  - Mayor: Lutz Schlünsen (SPD)

Area
  - Total: 7.78 km^{2} (3.00 sq mi)
- Elevation: 29 m (95 ft)

Population (2025-12-31)
  - Total: 340
  - Density: 44/km^{2} (110/sq mi)
- Time zone: UTC+01:00 (CET)
  - Summer (DST): UTC+02:00 (CEST)
- Postal codes: 24256
- Dialling codes: 04303
- Vehicle registration: PLÖ
- Website: www.amt-probstei.de

Stoltenberg is a municipality in the district of Plön, in Schleswig-Holstein, Germany.
