= Nehmten =

- Municipality
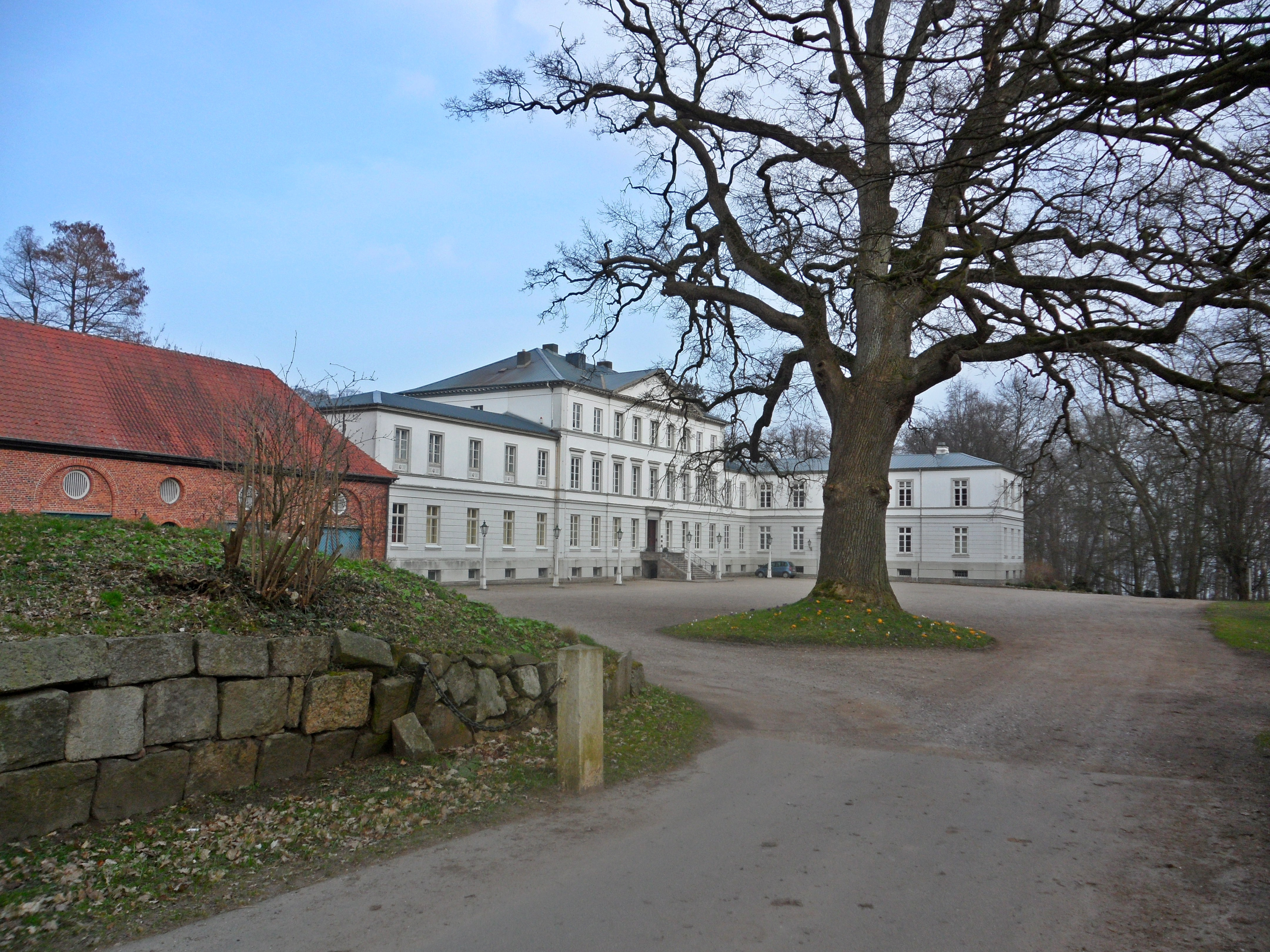
- Schloss Nehmten

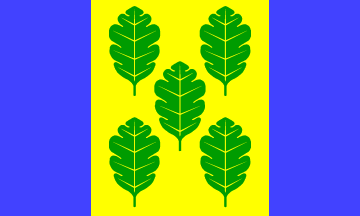
- Flag Coat of arms

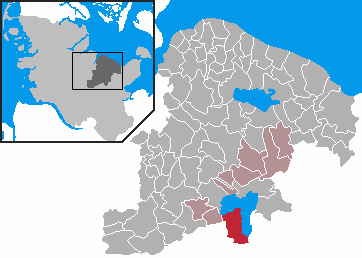
- Location of Nehmten within Plön district
- Interactive map of Nehmten
- Location within Germany Location within Schleswig-Holstein
- Coordinates: 54°6′N 10°24′E
- Country: Germany
- State: Schleswig-Holstein
- District: Plön
- Municipal assoc.: Großer Plöner See

Government
  - Mayor: Johannes Hintz

Area
  - Total: 22.04 km^{2} (8.51 sq mi)
- Elevation: 41 m (135 ft)

Population (2025-12-31)
  - Total: 301
  - Density: 13.7/km^{2} (35.4/sq mi)
- Time zone: UTC+01:00 (CET)
  - Summer (DST): UTC+02:00 (CEST)
- Postal codes: 24326
- Dialling codes: 04526 / 04555
- Vehicle registration: PLÖ
- Website: www.amt-grosser- ploener-see.de

Nehmten is a municipality in the district of Plön, in Schleswig-Holstein, Germany.
