= Lütjenburg (Amt) =

- Amt
- Coat of arms

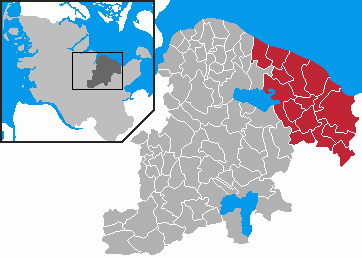
- Map of Plön highlighting Lütjenburg
- Interactive map of Lütjenburg
- Location within Germany Location within Schleswig-Holstein
- Coordinates: 54°18′N 10°35′E
- Country: Germany
- State: Schleswig-Holstein
- District: Plön
- Seat: Lütjenburg
- Subdivisions: 15 municipalities

Government
  - Mayor: Dirk Sohn

Area
  - Total: 225.15 km^{2} (86.93 sq mi)

Population (2025-12-31)
  - Total: 15,306
  - Density: 67.981/km^{2} (176.07/sq mi)
- Time zone: UTC+01:00 (CET)
  - Summer (DST): UTC+02:00 (CEST)
- Website: www.amt-luetjenburg.de

Lütjenburg is an Amt ("collective municipality") in the district of Plön, in Schleswig-Holstein, Germany. It is situated around the town Lütjenburg, which is the seat of the Amt.

== Subdivision ==
The Amt Lütjenburg-Land consists of the following municipalities:

1. Behrensdorf
2. Blekendorf
3. Dannau
4. Giekau
5. Helmstorf
6. Högsdorf
7. Hohenfelde
8. Hohwacht
9. Kirchnüchel
10. Klamp
11. Kletkamp
12. Lütjenburg
13. Panker
14. Schwartbuck
15. Tröndel
