= Großer Plöner See (Amt) =

- Amt
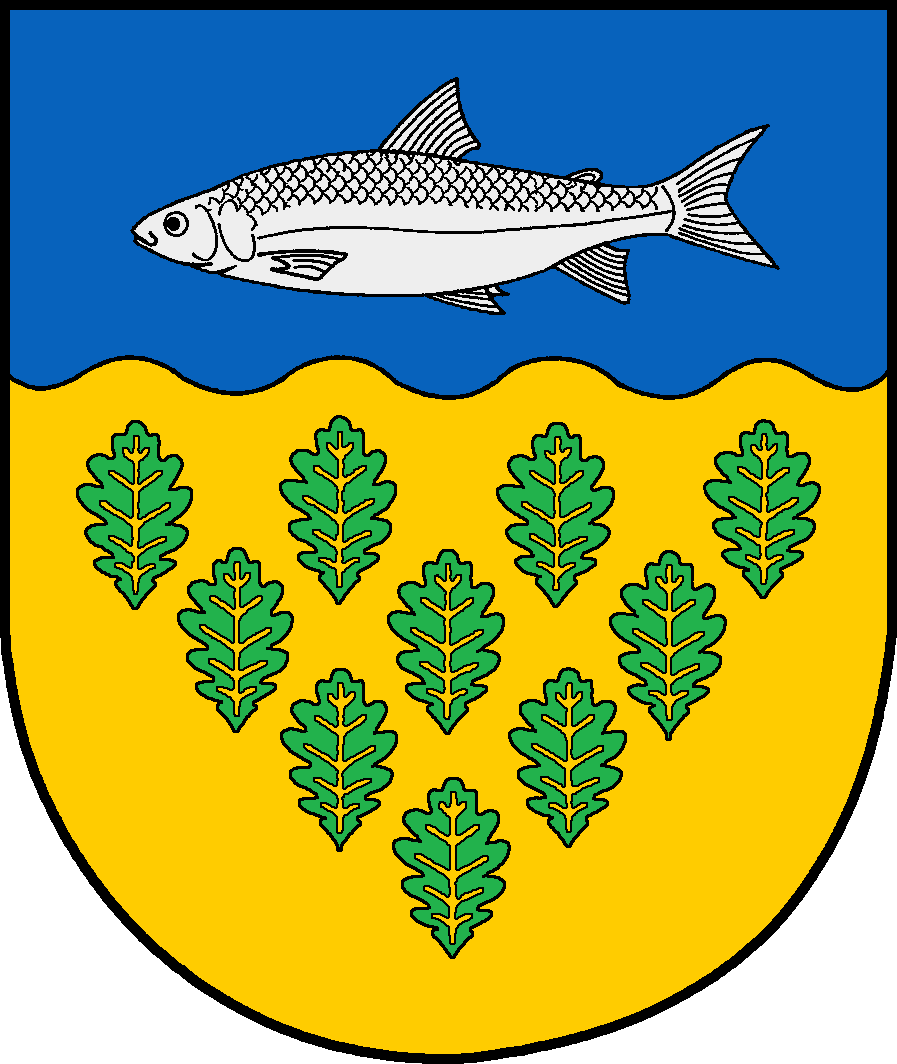
- Coat of arms

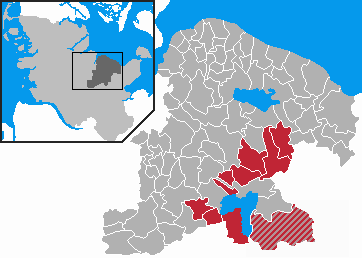
- Map of Plön highlighting Großer Plöner See
- Interactive map of Großer Plöner See
- Location within Germany Location within Schleswig-Holstein
- Coordinates: 54°10′N 10°25′E
- Country: Germany
- State: Schleswig-Holstein
- District: Plön and Ostholstein
- Seat: Plön
- Subdivisions: 10 municipalities

Government
  - Mayor: Holger Beiroth

Area
  - Total: 187.83 km^{2} (72.52 sq mi)

Population (2025-12-31)
  - Total: 7,984
  - Density: 42.51/km^{2} (110.1/sq mi)
- Time zone: UTC+01:00 (CET)
  - Summer (DST): UTC+02:00 (CEST)
- Website: www.amt-grosser-ploener-see.de

Großer Plöner See is an Amt ("collective municipality") in the districts of Plön and Ostholstein in Schleswig-Holstein, Germany. It is situated around Plön, which is the seat of the Amt, but not part of it. The Amt is named after the lake Großer Plöner See.

== Overview ==
It is one of the two Ämter (with Itzstedt) in Germany that joins municipalities into two different districts, but only Bosau is located in Ostholstein.

== Subdivision ==
The Amt Großer Plöner See consists of the following municipalities:

1. Bosau (Ostholstein district)
2. Dersau
3. Dörnick
4. Grebin
5. Kalübbe
6. Lebrade
7. Nehmten
8. Rantzau
9. Rathjensdorf
10. Wittmoldt
