= Brodersdorf =

- Municipality
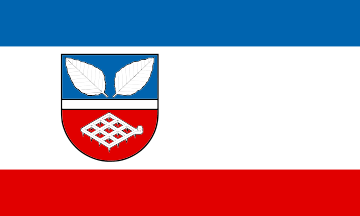
- Flag Coat of arms

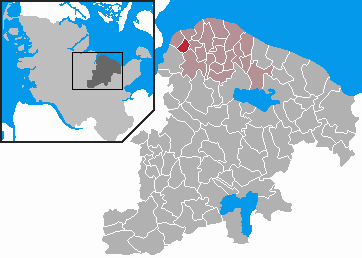
- Location of Brodersdorf within Plön district
- Interactive map of Brodersdorf
- Location within Germany Location within Schleswig-Holstein
- Coordinates: 54°22′N 10°15′E
- Country: Germany
- State: Schleswig-Holstein
- District: Plön
- Municipal assoc.: Probstei

Government
  - Mayor: Ferdinand Mülder-von Guerard

Area
  - Total: 3.63 km^{2} (1.40 sq mi)
- Elevation: 23 m (75 ft)

Population (2025-12-31)
  - Total: 425
  - Density: 117/km^{2} (303/sq mi)
- Time zone: UTC+01:00 (CET)
  - Summer (DST): UTC+02:00 (CEST)
- Postal codes: 24235
- Dialling codes: 04343
- Vehicle registration: PLÖ
- Website: www.brodersdorf.de

Brodersdorf is a municipality in the district of Plön, in Schleswig-Holstein, Germany.
