= Mönkeberg =

- Municipality
- Coat of arms

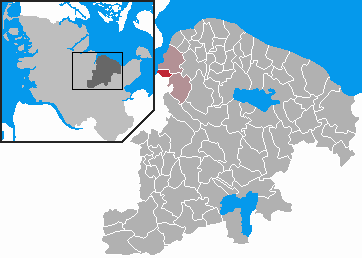
- Location of Mönkeberg within Plön district
- Interactive map of Mönkeberg
- Location within Germany Location within Schleswig-Holstein
- Coordinates: 54°21′0″N 10°11′20″E
- Country: Germany
- State: Schleswig-Holstein
- District: Plön
- Municipal assoc.: Schrevenborn

Government
  - Mayor: Hildegard Mersmann (CDU)

Area
  - Total: 2.71 km^{2} (1.05 sq mi)
- Elevation: 12 m (39 ft)

Population (2025-12-31)
  - Total: 4,025
  - Density: 1,490/km^{2} (3,850/sq mi)
- Time zone: UTC+01:00 (CET)
  - Summer (DST): UTC+02:00 (CEST)
- Postal codes: 24248
- Dialling codes: 0431
- Vehicle registration: PLÖ
- Website: www.amt- schrevenborn.de

Mönkeberg is a municipality in the district of Plön, in Schleswig-Holstein, Germany. It is situated approximately 5 km northeast of Kiel.
