= Lebrade =

- Municipality
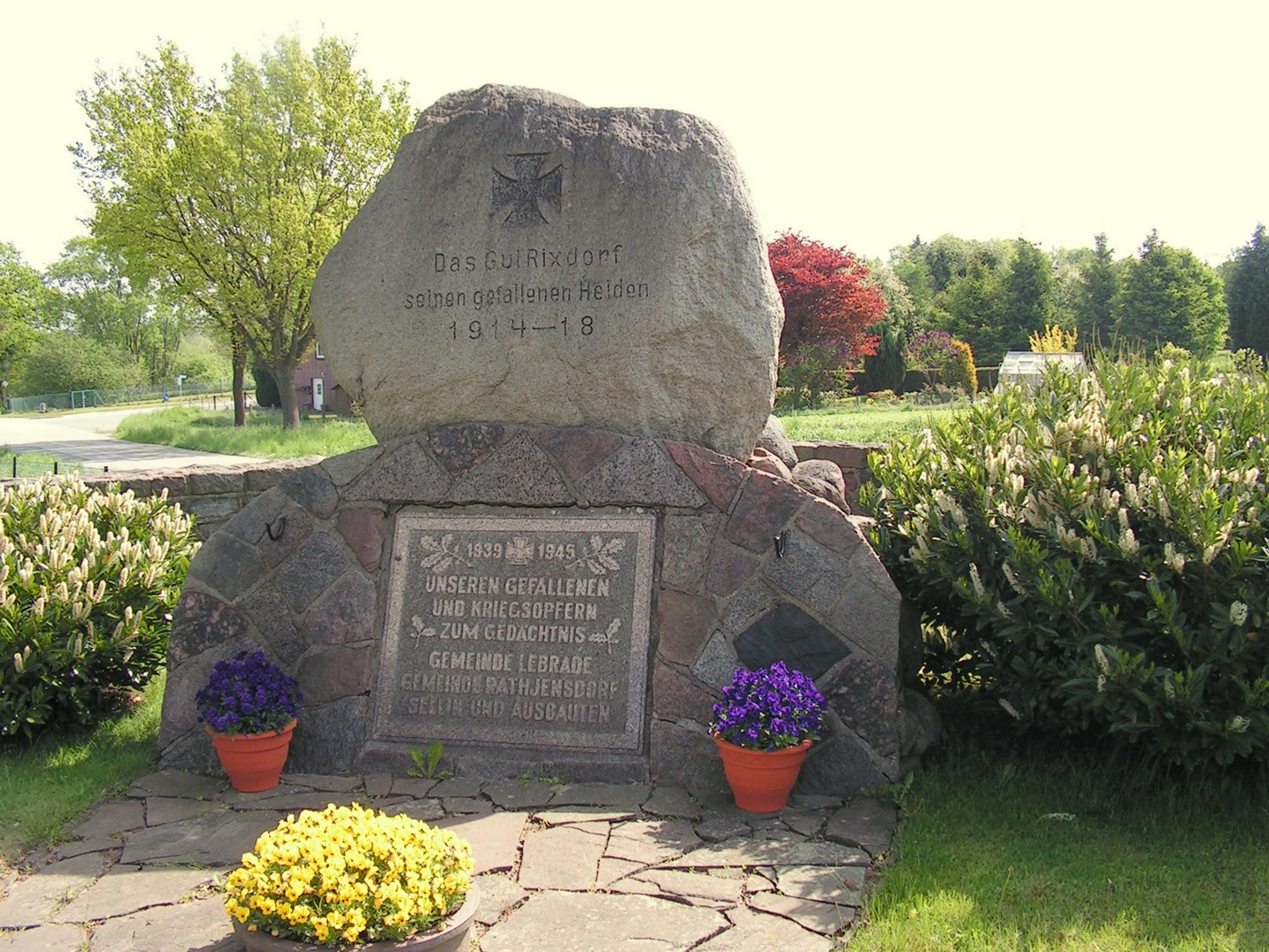
- War memorial in Lebrade

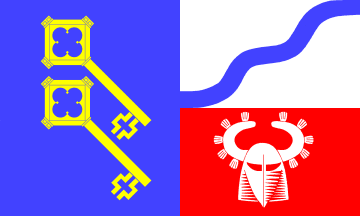
- Flag Coat of arms

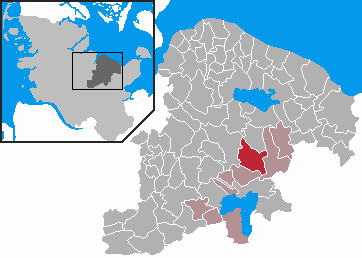
- Location of Lebrade within Plön district
- Interactive map of Lebrade
- Location within Germany Location within Schleswig-Holstein
- Coordinates: 54°13′N 10°25′E
- Country: Germany
- State: Schleswig-Holstein
- District: Plön
- Municipal assoc.: Großer Plöner See

Government
  - Mayor: Jörg Prüß (SPD)

Area
  - Total: 18.59 km^{2} (7.18 sq mi)
- Elevation: 41 m (135 ft)

Population (2025-12-31)
  - Total: 545
  - Density: 29.3/km^{2} (75.9/sq mi)
- Time zone: UTC+01:00 (CET)
  - Summer (DST): UTC+02:00 (CEST)
- Postal codes: 24306
- Dialling codes: 04383
- Vehicle registration: PLÖ
- Website: www.amt-grosser- ploener-see.de

Lebrade is a municipality in the district of Plön, in Schleswig-Holstein, Germany.
