= Schwartbuck =

- Municipality
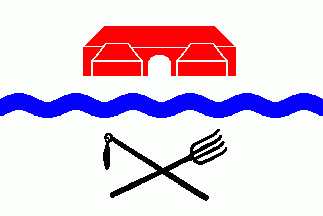
- Flag Coat of arms

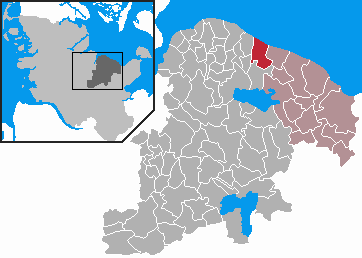
- Location of Schwartbuck within Plön district
- Interactive map of Schwartbuck
- Location within Germany Location within Schleswig-Holstein
- Coordinates: 54°21′N 10°28′E
- Country: Germany
- State: Schleswig-Holstein
- District: Plön
- Municipal assoc.: Lütjenburg

Government
  - Mayor: Rudolf Goodknecht

Area
  - Total: 13.09 km^{2} (5.05 sq mi)
- Elevation: 47 m (154 ft)

Population (2025-12-31)
  - Total: 805
  - Density: 61.5/km^{2} (159/sq mi)
- Time zone: UTC+01:00 (CET)
  - Summer (DST): UTC+02:00 (CEST)
- Postal codes: 24257
- Dialling codes: 04385
- Vehicle registration: PLÖ
- Website: www.schwartbuck.de

Schwartbuck is a municipality that is located in the district of Plön, in Schleswig-Holstein, Germany.
