= Blekendorf =

- Municipality
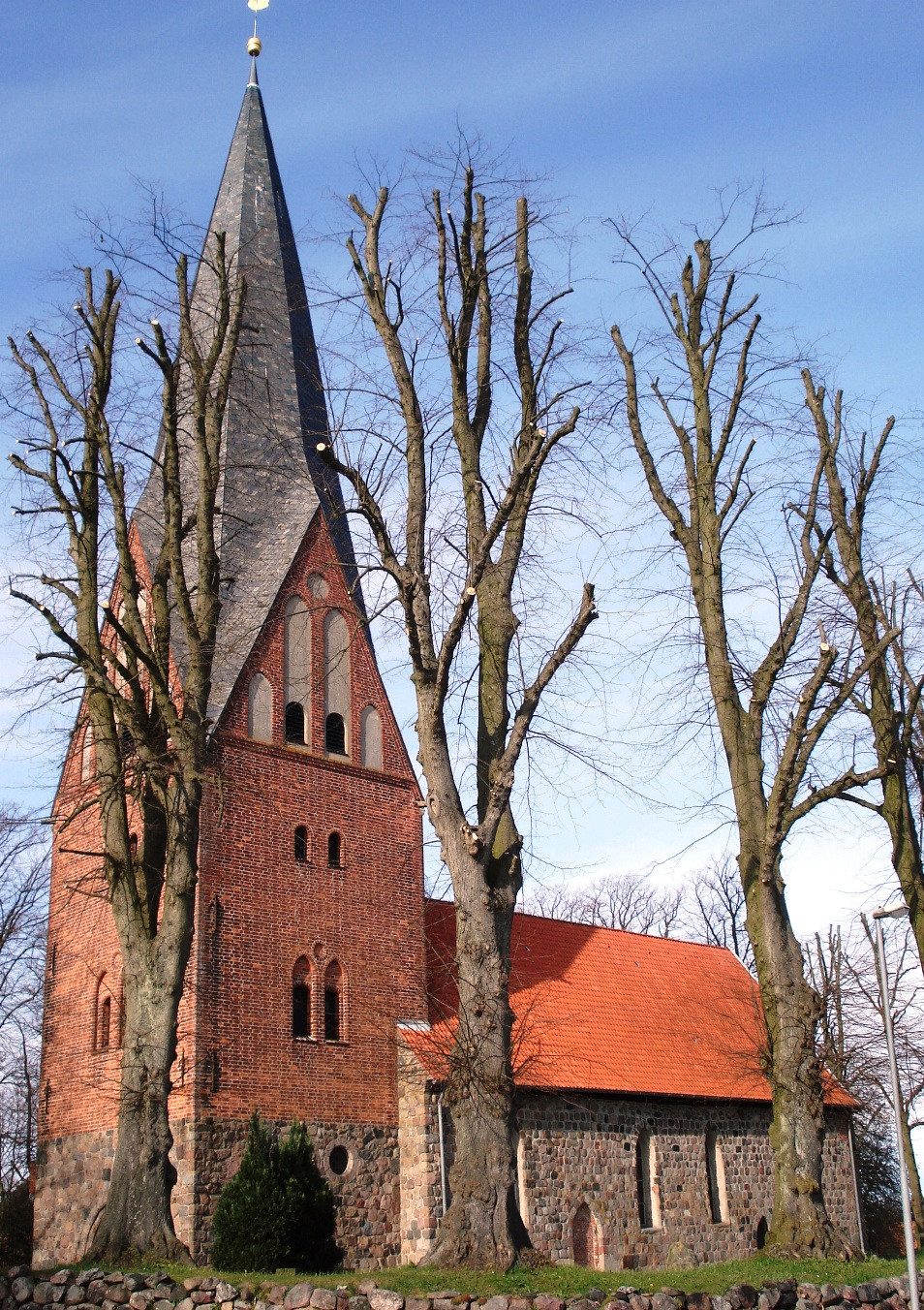
- Village church in Blekendorf

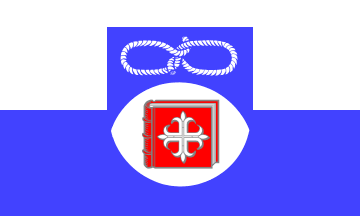
- Flag Coat of arms

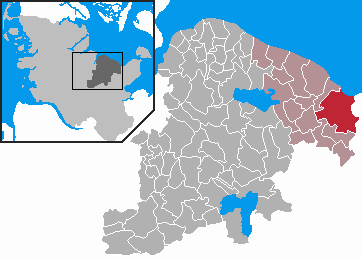
- Location of Blekendorf within Plön district
- Interactive map of Blekendorf
- Location within Germany Location within Schleswig-Holstein
- Coordinates: 54°16′N 10°39′E
- Country: Germany
- State: Schleswig-Holstein
- District: Plön
- Municipal assoc.: Lütjenburg

Government
  - Mayor: Andreas Köpke (CDU)

Area
  - Total: 38.34 km^{2} (14.80 sq mi)
- Elevation: 29 m (95 ft)

Population (2025-12-31)
  - Total: 1,641
  - Density: 42.80/km^{2} (110.9/sq mi)
- Time zone: UTC+01:00 (CET)
  - Summer (DST): UTC+02:00 (CEST)
- Postal codes: 24327
- Dialling codes: 04381
- Vehicle registration: PLÖ

Blekendorf is a municipality in the district of Plön, in Schleswig-Holstein, Germany. It has a population of 1,694 people (2020).

== History ==
Blekendorf was first mentioned in 1259 as Blegkendorpe (later spelled Bleckendorp ). The name probably comes from Middle Low German and means "looking" or "shining village." Since the 13th century, Blekendorf has been the ecclesiastical center for the surrounding villages of Futterkamp, Friederikenthal, Sechendorf, Sehlendorf, Rathlau, and Kaköhl. In 1855, 258 people lived in the village of Blekendorf itself.
