= Krokau =

- Municipality
- Flag Coat of arms

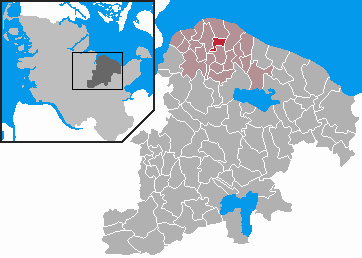
- Location of Krokau within Plön district
- Interactive map of Krokau
- Location within Germany Location within Schleswig-Holstein
- Coordinates: 54°24′N 10°21′E
- Country: Germany
- State: Schleswig-Holstein
- District: Plön
- Municipal assoc.: Probstei

Government
  - Mayor: Markus Sinjen

Area
  - Total: 4.45 km^{2} (1.72 sq mi)
- Elevation: 6 m (20 ft)

Population (2025-12-31)
  - Total: 398
  - Density: 89.4/km^{2} (232/sq mi)
- Time zone: UTC+01:00 (CET)
  - Summer (DST): UTC+02:00 (CEST)
- Postal codes: 24217
- Dialling codes: 04344
- Vehicle registration: PLÖ
- Website: www.amt-probstei.de

Krokau is a municipality in the district of Plön, in Schleswig-Holstein, Germany.
