= Fahren =

- Municipality
- Coat of arms

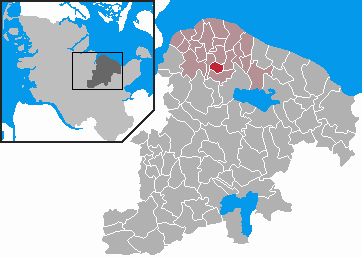
- Location of Fahren within Plön district
- Interactive map of Fahren
- Location within Germany Location within Schleswig-Holstein
- Coordinates: 54°21′N 10°19′E
- Country: Germany
- State: Schleswig-Holstein
- District: Plön
- Municipal assoc.: Probstei

Government
  - Mayor: Heino Schnoor

Area
  - Total: 3.6 km^{2} (1.4 sq mi)
- Elevation: 25 m (82 ft)

Population (2025-12-31)
  - Total: 123
  - Density: 34/km^{2} (88/sq mi)
- Time zone: UTC+01:00 (CET)
  - Summer (DST): UTC+02:00 (CEST)
- Postal codes: 24253
- Dialling codes: 04344
- Vehicle registration: PLÖ
- Website: www.amt-probstei.de

Fahren (German pronunciation: [ˈfaːʁən]) is a municipality in the district of Plön, in Schleswig-Holstein, Germany.
