= Giekau =

- Municipality
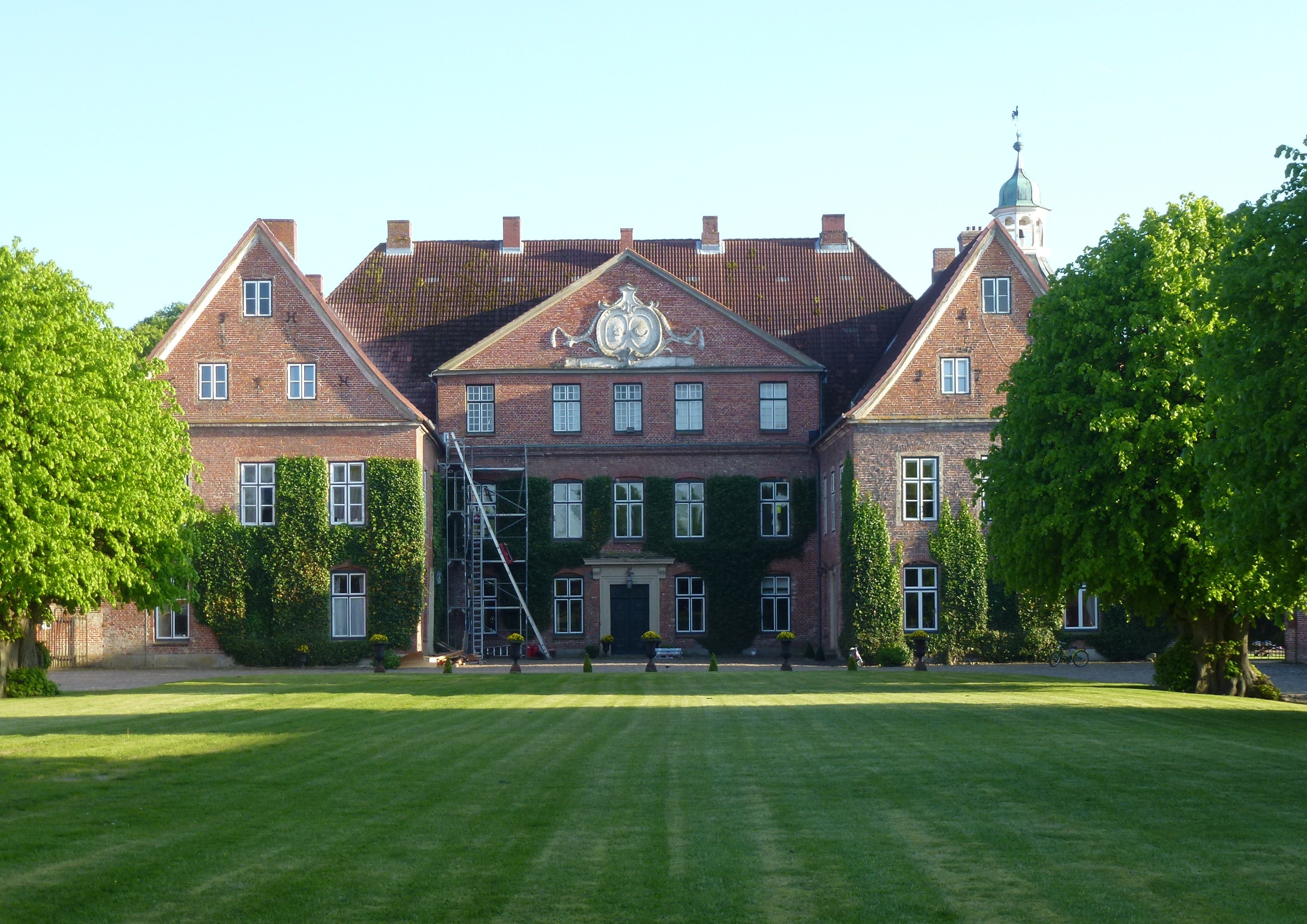
- Neuhaus Manor in Giekau

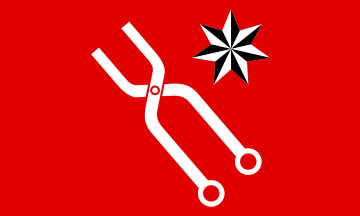
- Flag Coat of arms

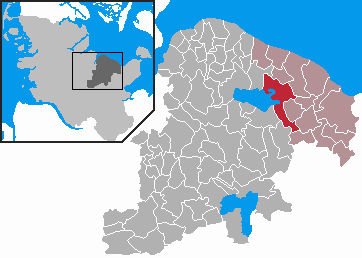
- Location of Giekau within Plön district
- Interactive map of Giekau
- Location within Germany Location within Schleswig-Holstein
- Coordinates: 54°19′N 10°31′E
- Country: Germany
- State: Schleswig-Holstein
- District: Plön
- Municipal assoc.: Lütjenburg

Government
  - Mayor: Manfred Koch

Area
  - Total: 32.8 km^{2} (12.7 sq mi)
- Elevation: 41 m (135 ft)

Population (2025-12-31)
  - Total: 958
  - Density: 29.2/km^{2} (75.6/sq mi)
- Time zone: UTC+01:00 (CET)
  - Summer (DST): UTC+02:00 (CEST)
- Postal codes: 24321
- Dialling codes: 04381, 04385
- Vehicle registration: PLÖ

Giekau is a municipality in the district of Plön, in Schleswig-Holstein, Germany.
