= Schönhorst (Schönkirchen) =

Coordinates: 54.3353°N 10.2456°E

Schönhorst is a local center within the municipality Schönkirchen in the district of Plön, in Schleswig-Holstein, Germany.

== History ==
The exact year of the foundation of the village is unknown. It was first mentioned as part of a conveyance of property of the village and the manor of Schönhorst in 1515 to Frederick I of Denmark Yet he sold the village shortly after. The family Gadendorp owned the village in 1543. Christopher Gadendorp co-founded the Große Brand- und Kirchengilde (the Great Fire and Church Guild) in 1560, a guild to help share the burden of Gadendorp’s subjects among the guild’s members in case of a fire.

Both village and manor of Schönhorst were sold to the lord of the manor of Oppendorf in 1616. Schönhorst remained a part of the municipality of Oppendorf until April 1, 1970 when Schönhorst officially became a part of the municipality of Schönkirchen.

The Knochenbruchsgilde für Schönhorst und Umgebung (the Fracture Guild of Schönhorst and Surrounding Areas), a guild that supports its members in case of occupational bone fractures and which still exists today, was founded in 1853.

The structure of the village had not changed over the centuries until 1929 when the lease contract for the manor was discontinued. Most of the land was sold to a land settlement society which subdivided the area of the manor in settlers’ holdings of 37-49 acres each.

== Flak-tower ==
To protect the naval port of Kiel during World War II, an AA gun emplacement with bunkers and barracks was built in Schönhorst; however, the residents had no access to these constructions. Because of this AA gun emplacement, Schönhorst was heavily bombarded with 87 direct hits within 39 acres. The AA gun emplacement was blown up on June 22 of 1945.

After the war, the barracks were used to accommodate expellees and were demolished in the 1950s. In contrast to the majority of villages and towns within Germany, no housing estates were established in Schönhorst, so that all expellees settled in different places.
