= Tröndel =

- Municipality
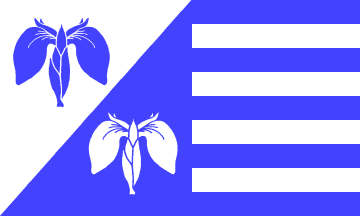
- Flag Coat of arms

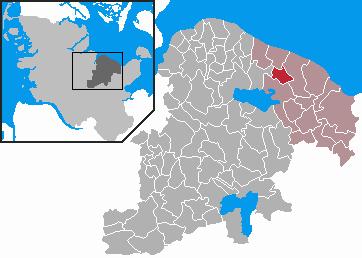
- Location of Tröndel within Plön district
- Interactive map of Tröndel
- Location within Germany Location within Schleswig-Holstein
- Coordinates: 54°20′12″N 10°30′25″E
- Country: Germany
- State: Schleswig-Holstein
- District: Plön
- Municipal assoc.: Lütjenburg

Government
  - Mayor: Hans-Herbert Wiese (CDU)

Area
  - Total: 7.58 km^{2} (2.93 sq mi)
- Elevation: 49 m (161 ft)

Population (2025-12-31)
  - Total: 368
  - Density: 48.5/km^{2} (126/sq mi)
- Time zone: UTC+01:00 (CET)
  - Summer (DST): UTC+02:00 (CEST)
- Postal codes: 24321
- Dialling codes: 04381
- Vehicle registration: PLÖ

Tröndel is a municipality in the district of Plön, in Schleswig-Holstein, Germany.
