= Prasdorf =

- Municipality
- Coat of arms

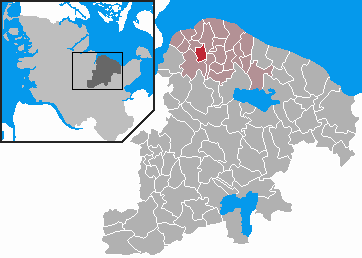
- Location of Prasdorf within Plön district
- Interactive map of Prasdorf
- Location within Germany Location within Schleswig-Holstein
- Coordinates: 54°22′N 10°18′E
- Country: Germany
- State: Schleswig-Holstein
- District: Plön
- Municipal assoc.: Probstei

Government
  - Mayor: Matthias Gnauck

Area
  - Total: 4.77 km^{2} (1.84 sq mi)
- Elevation: 20 m (66 ft)

Population (2025-12-31)
  - Total: 458
  - Density: 96.0/km^{2} (249/sq mi)
- Time zone: UTC+01:00 (CET)
  - Summer (DST): UTC+02:00 (CEST)
- Postal codes: 24253
- Dialling codes: 04344
- Vehicle registration: PLÖ
- Website: www.amt-probstei.de

Prasdorf is a municipality in the district of Plön, in Schleswig-Holstein, Germany.
