= Klamp =

- Municipality
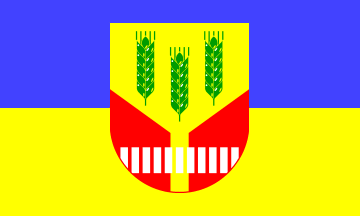
- Flag Coat of arms

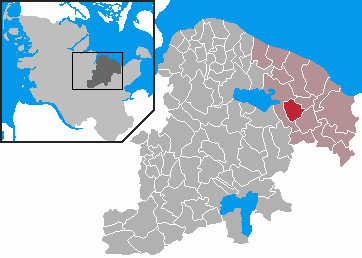
- Location of Klamp within Plön district
- Interactive map of Klamp
- Location within Germany Location within Schleswig-Holstein
- Coordinates: 54°18′1″N 10°31′58″E
- Country: Germany
- State: Schleswig-Holstein
- District: Plön
- Municipal assoc.: Lütjenburg

Government
  - Mayor: Stefan Ehrk

Area
  - Total: 9.72 km^{2} (3.75 sq mi)
- Elevation: 79 m (259 ft)

Population (2025-12-31)
  - Total: 616
  - Density: 63.4/km^{2} (164/sq mi)
- Time zone: UTC+01:00 (CET)
  - Summer (DST): UTC+02:00 (CEST)
- Postal codes: 24321
- Dialling codes: 04381
- Vehicle registration: PLÖ

Klamp is a municipality in the district of Plön, in Schleswig-Holstein, Germany. It has a population of around 800.
