= Wendtorf =

- Municipality
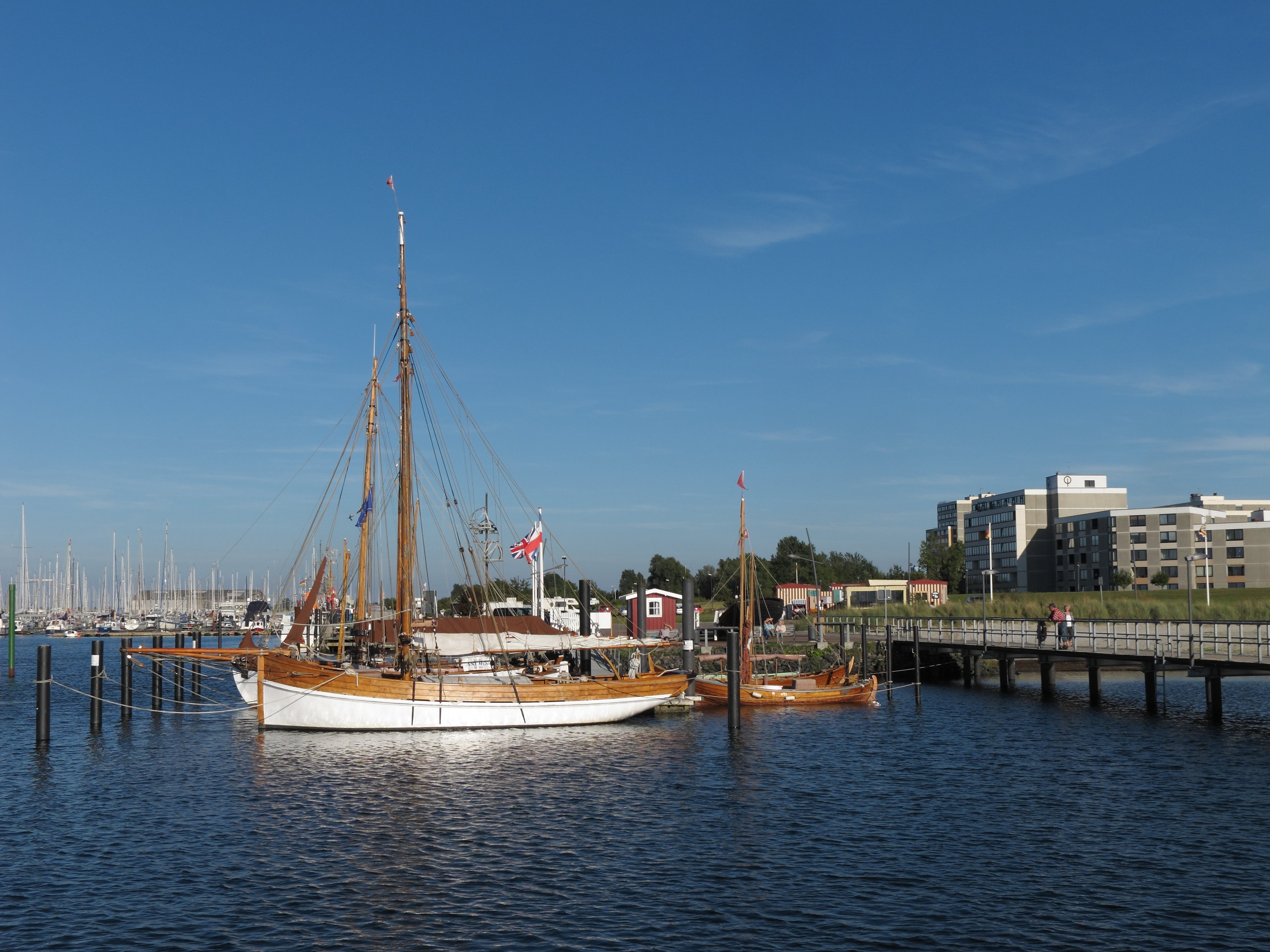

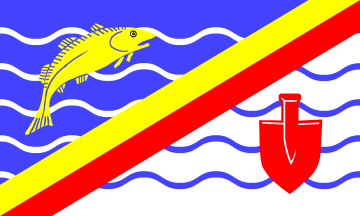
- Flag Coat of arms

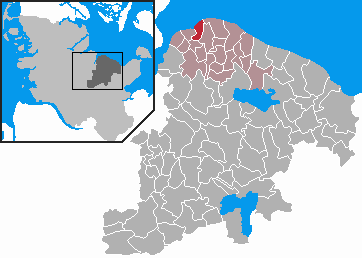
- Location of Wendtorf within Plön district
- Interactive map of Wendtorf
- Location within Germany Location within Schleswig-Holstein
- Coordinates: 54°25′N 10°18′E
- Country: Germany
- State: Schleswig-Holstein
- District: Plön
- Municipal assoc.: Probstei

Government
  - Mayor: Claus Heller (CDU)

Area
  - Total: 5.1 km^{2} (2.0 sq mi)
- Elevation: 1 m (3.3 ft)

Population (2025-12-31)
  - Total: 957
  - Density: 190/km^{2} (490/sq mi)
- Time zone: UTC+01:00 (CET)
  - Summer (DST): UTC+02:00 (CEST)
- Postal codes: 24235
- Dialling codes: 04343
- Vehicle registration: PLÖ
- Website: www.amt-probstei.de

Wendtorf is a municipality in the district of Plön, in Schleswig-Holstein, Germany.
