= Probstei =

- Amt
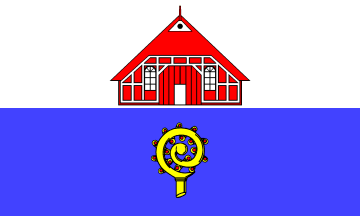
- Flag Coat of arms

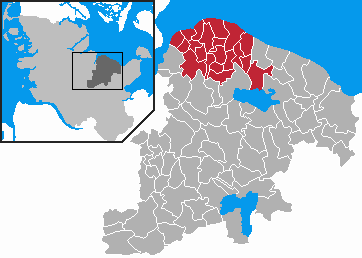
- Map of Plön highlighting Probstei
- Interactive map of Probstei
- Location within Germany Location within Schleswig-Holstein
- Coordinates: 54°24′N 10°22′E
- Country: Germany
- State: Schleswig-Holstein
- District: Plön
- Seat: Schönberg
- Subdivisions: 20 municipalities

Government
  - Mayor: Wolf Mönkemeier

Area
  - Total: 132.86 km^{2} (51.30 sq mi)

Population (2025-12-31)
  - Total: 22,493
  - Density: 169.30/km^{2} (438.48/sq mi)
- Time zone: UTC+01:00 (CET)
  - Summer (DST): UTC+02:00 (CEST)
- Website: www.amt-probstei.de

Probstei (German pronunciation: [pʁoːpsˈtaɪ]) is an Amt ("collective municipality") in the district of Plön, in Schleswig-Holstein, Germany. It is situated around Schönberg, which is the seat of the Amt.

== Subdivision ==
The Amt Probstei consists of the following municipalities:

1. Barsbek
2. Bendfeld
3. Brodersdorf
4. Fahren
5. Fiefbergen
6. Höhndorf
7. Köhn
8. Krokau
9. Krummbek
10. Laboe
11. Lutterbek
12. Passade
13. Prasdorf
14. Probsteierhagen
15. Schönberg
16. Stakendorf
17. Stein
18. Stoltenberg
19. Wendtorf
20. Wisch
