= Högsdorf =

- Municipality
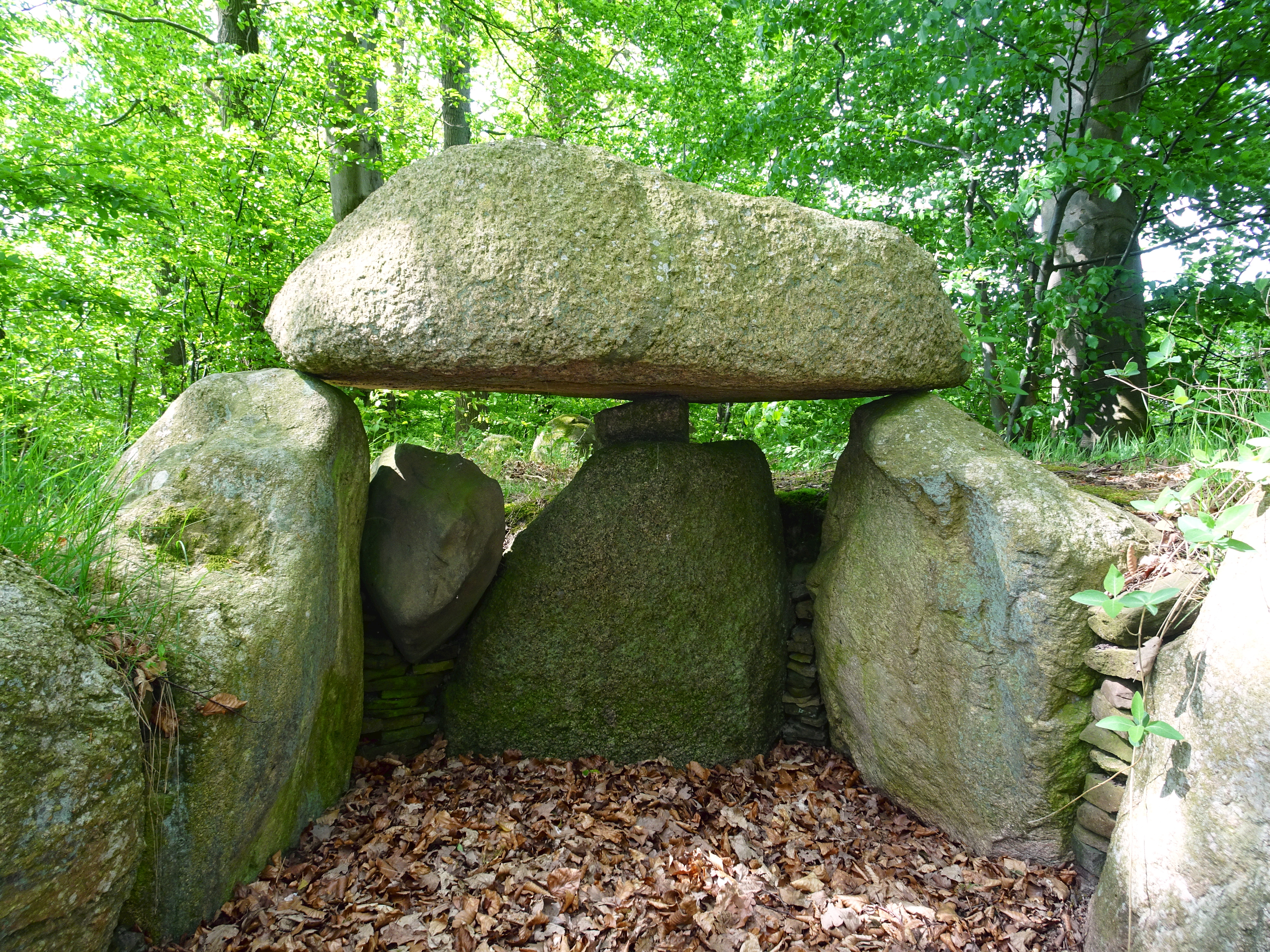
- Megalithic tomb (Großsteingräber bei Flehm) in Högsdorf

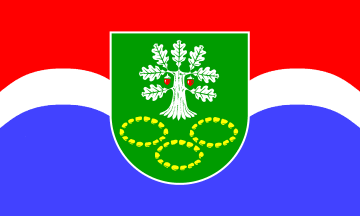
- Flag Coat of arms

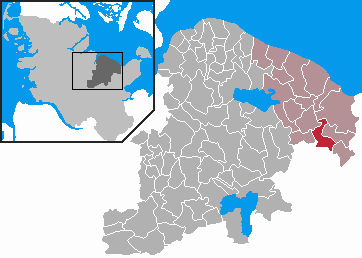
- Location of Högsdorf within Plön district
- Interactive map of Högsdorf
- Location within Germany Location within Schleswig-Holstein
- Coordinates: 54°15′13″N 10°37′3″E
- Country: Germany
- State: Schleswig-Holstein
- District: Plön
- Municipal assoc.: Lütjenburg

Government
  - Mayor: Klaus-Peter Klasen

Area
  - Total: 10.92 km^{2} (4.22 sq mi)
- Elevation: 51 m (167 ft)

Population (2025-12-31)
  - Total: 403
  - Density: 36.9/km^{2} (95.6/sq mi)
- Time zone: UTC+01:00 (CET)
  - Summer (DST): UTC+02:00 (CEST)
- Postal codes: 24327
- Dialling codes: 04381
- Vehicle registration: PLÖ

Högsdorf is a municipality in the district of Plön, in Schleswig-Holstein, Germany.
