= Dörnick =

- Municipality
- Flag Coat of arms

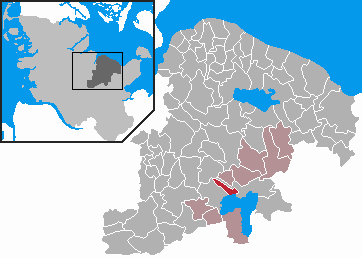
- Location of Dörnick within Plön district
- Interactive map of Dörnick
- Location within Germany Location within Schleswig-Holstein
- Coordinates: 54°10′N 10°22′E
- Country: Germany
- State: Schleswig-Holstein
- District: Plön
- Municipal assoc.: Großer Plöner See

Government
  - Mayor: Dieter Wittke

Area
  - Total: 4.3 km^{2} (1.7 sq mi)
- Elevation: 23 m (75 ft)

Population (2025-12-31)
  - Total: 247
  - Density: 57/km^{2} (150/sq mi)
- Time zone: UTC+01:00 (CET)
  - Summer (DST): UTC+02:00 (CEST)
- Postal codes: 24326
- Dialling codes: 04522, 04526
- Vehicle registration: PLÖ
- Website: www.doernick.de

Dörnick is a municipality in the district of Plön, in Schleswig-Holstein, Germany.

== Climate ==
Climate data for Dörnick (1991–2020 normals)
Month	Jan	Feb	Mar	Apr	May	Jun	Jul	Aug	Sep	Oct	Nov	Dec	Year
Mean daily maximum °C (°F)	4.0 (39.2)	4.5 (40.1)	8.1 (46.6)	13.2 (55.8)	17.2 (63.0)	20.5 (68.9)	22.8 (73.0)	22.4 (72.3)	18.8 (65.8)	13.2 (55.8)	8.3 (46.9)	5.0 (41.0)	13.2 (55.8)
Daily mean °C (°F)	1.8 (35.2)	2.1 (35.8)	4.5 (40.1)	8.3 (46.9)	12.2 (54.0)	15.6 (60.1)	17.6 (63.7)	17.4 (63.3)	14.2 (57.6)	10.1 (50.2)	5.8 (42.4)	3.0 (37.4)	9.5 (49.1)
Mean daily minimum °C (°F)	−0.6 (30.9)	−0.6 (30.9)	0.8 (33.4)	3.2 (37.8)	6.6 (43.9)	10.0 (50.0)	12.1 (53.8)	12.3 (54.1)	9.7 (49.5)	6.6 (43.9)	3.5 (38.3)	0.7 (33.3)	5.5 (41.9)
Average precipitation mm (inches)	42.1 (1.66)	32.7 (1.29)	42.1 (1.66)	36.3 (1.43)	62.9 (2.48)	62.6 (2.46)	84.5 (3.33)	80.1 (3.15)	51.7 (2.04)	49.9 (1.96)	47.5 (1.87)	44.0 (1.73)	636.5 (25.06)
Average relative humidity (%)	89.2	86.2	82.0	76.1	77.0	77.2	78.2	79.7	82.9	86.1	90.0	90.4	82.1
Mean monthly sunshine hours	31.0	61.7	119.1	195.8	232.8	222.9	220.5	192.4	159.4	104.6	50.6	31.5	1,608.7
Source: NOAA
