= Schwentinental =

- Town
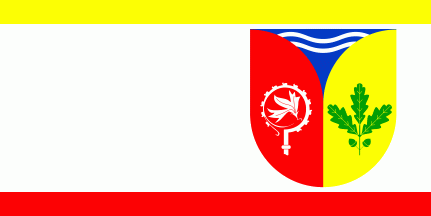
- Flag Coat of arms

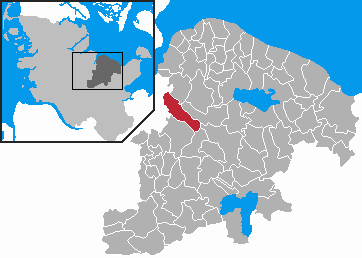
- Location of Schwentinental within Plön district
- Interactive map of Schwentinental
- Location within Germany Location within Schleswig-Holstein
- Coordinates: 54°16′N 10°13′E
- Country: Germany
- State: Schleswig-Holstein
- District: Plön

Government
  - Mayor: Michael Stremlau

Area
  - Total: 17.81 km^{2} (6.88 sq mi)

Population (2025-12-31)
  - Total: 14,037
  - Density: 788.2/km^{2} (2,041/sq mi)
- Time zone: UTC+01:00 (CET)
  - Summer (DST): UTC+02:00 (CEST)
- Postal codes: 24222, 24223
- Dialling codes: 04307, 0431, 04342
- Vehicle registration: PLÖ
- Website: www.schwentinental.de

Schwentinental (German pronunciation: [ʃvɛnˈtiːnənˌtaːl], lit. 'Schwentine Valley') is a town in the district of Plön, in Schleswig-Holstein, Germany. It was formed on 1 March 2008 from the former municipalities Raisdorf and Klausdorf.
