= Stein, Schleswig-Holstein =

Stein
- Municipality
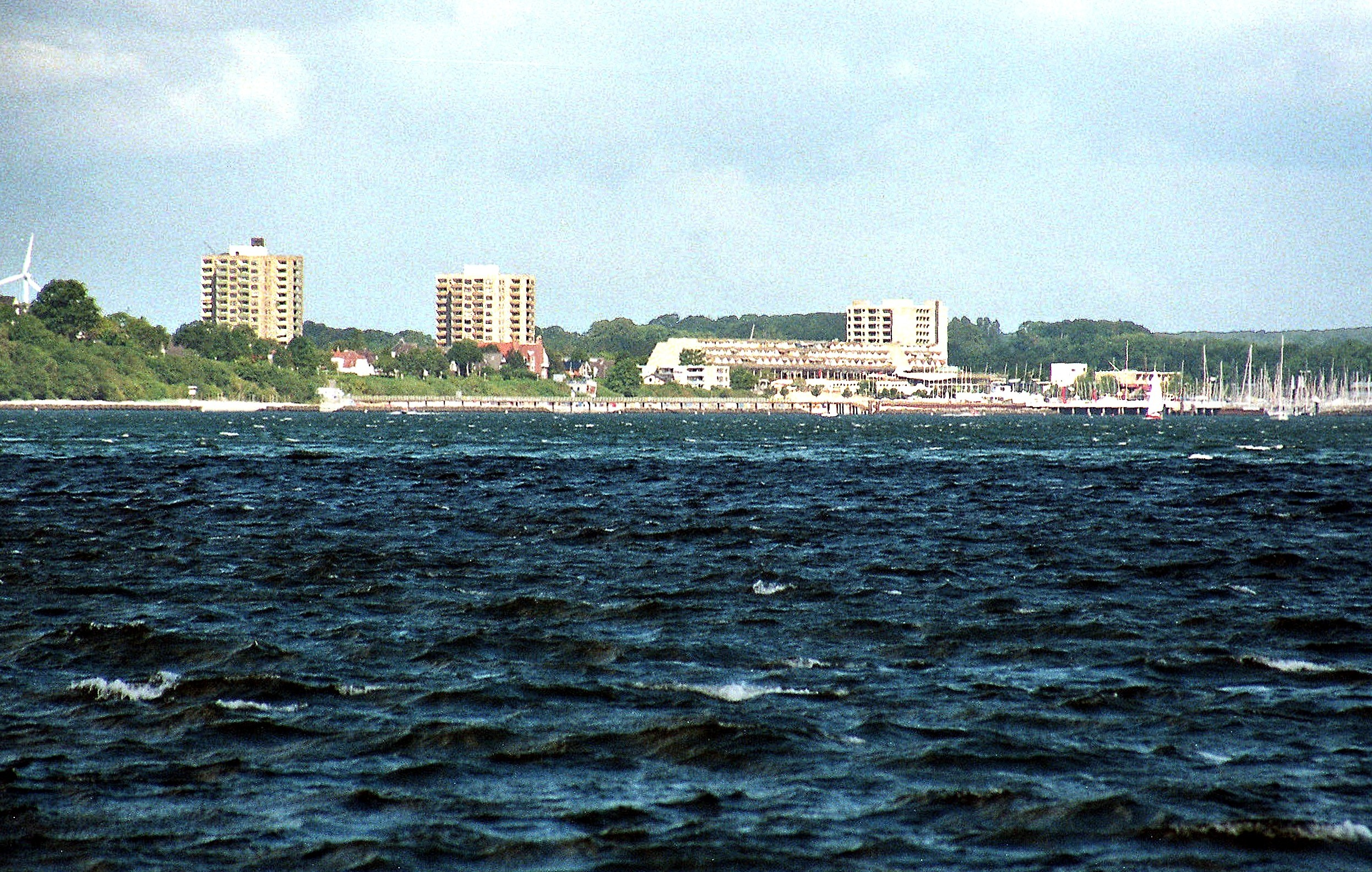

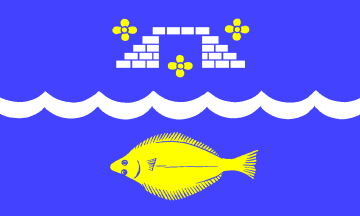
- Flag Coat of arms

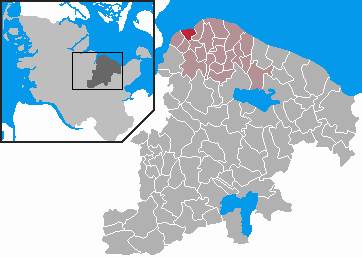
- Location of Stein within Plön district
- Interactive map of Stein
- Location within Germany Location within Schleswig-Holstein
- Coordinates: 54°25′N 10°16′E
- Country: Germany
- State: Schleswig-Holstein
- District: Plön
- Municipal assoc.: Probstei

Government
  - Mayor: Peter Dieterich (CDU)

Area
  - Total: 3.81 km^{2} (1.47 sq mi)
- Elevation: 4 m (13 ft)

Population (2025-12-31)
  - Total: 871
  - Density: 229/km^{2} (592/sq mi)
- Time zone: UTC+01:00 (CET)
  - Summer (DST): UTC+02:00 (CEST)
- Postal codes: 24235
- Dialling codes: 04343
- Vehicle registration: PLÖ
- Website: www.amt-probstei.de

Stein (German pronunciation: [ʃtaɪn]) is a municipality in the district of Plön, in Schleswig-Holstein, Germany.
