= Probsteierhagen =

- Municipality
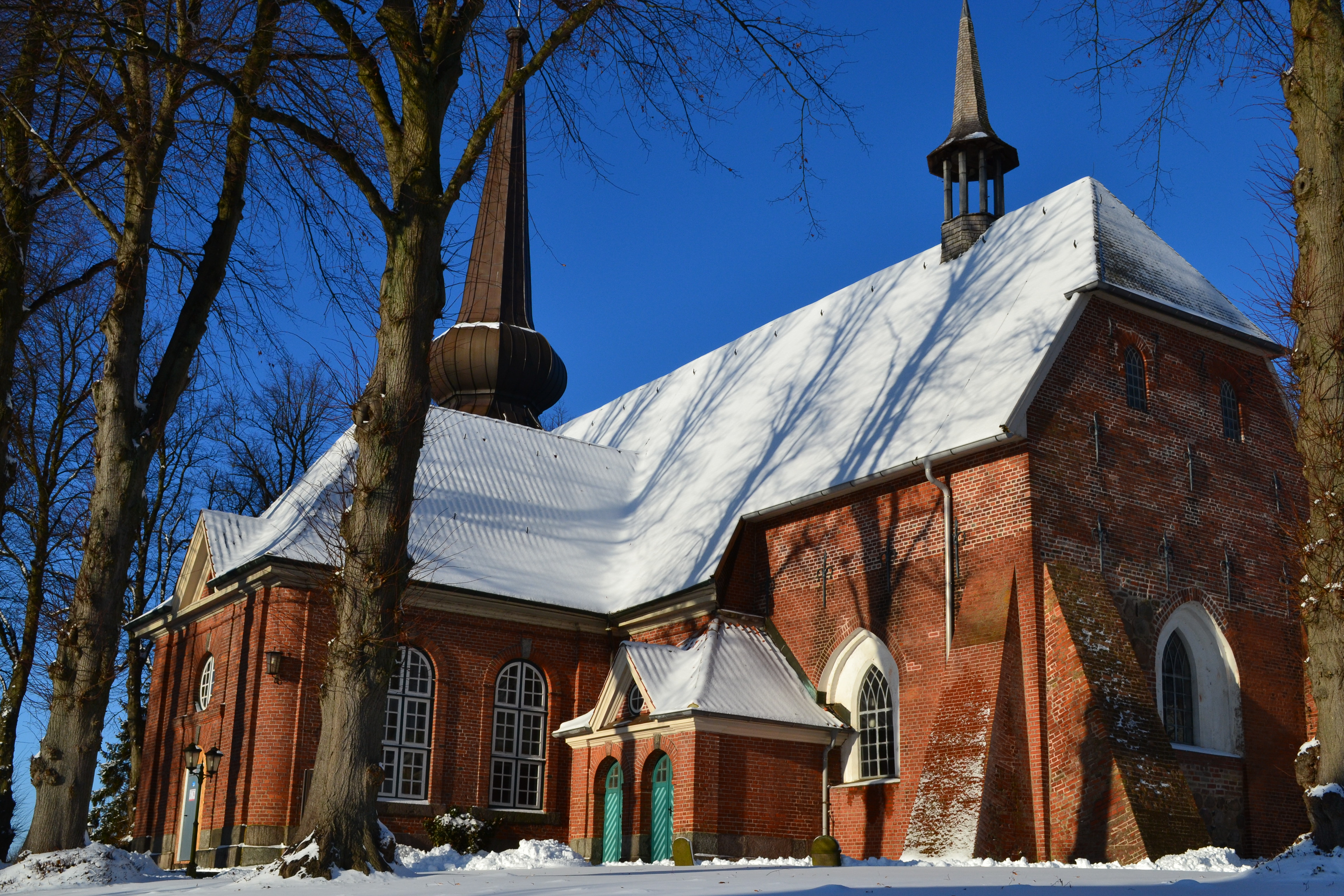
- Church in Probsteierhagen

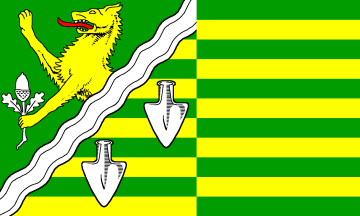
- Flag Coat of arms

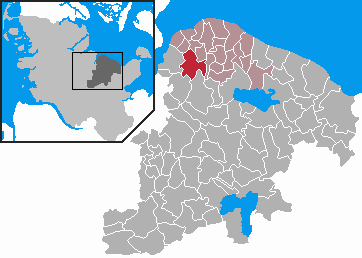
- Location of Probsteierhagen within Plön district
- Interactive map of Probsteierhagen
- Location within Germany Location within Schleswig-Holstein
- Coordinates: 54°22′N 10°16′E
- Country: Germany
- State: Schleswig-Holstein
- District: Plön
- Municipal assoc.: Probstei

Government
  - Mayor: Angela Maaß

Area
  - Total: 14.95 km^{2} (5.77 sq mi)
- Elevation: 29 m (95 ft)

Population (2025-12-31)
  - Total: 2,489
  - Density: 166.5/km^{2} (431.2/sq mi)
- Time zone: UTC+01:00 (CET)
  - Summer (DST): UTC+02:00 (CEST)
- Postal codes: 24253
- Dialling codes: 04348
- Vehicle registration: PLÖ
- Website: www.probsteierhagen.de

Probsteierhagen is a municipality in the district of Plön, in Schleswig-Holstein, Germany.
