= Fiefbergen =

- Municipality
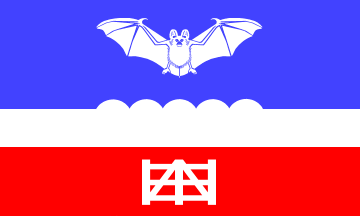
- Flag Coat of arms

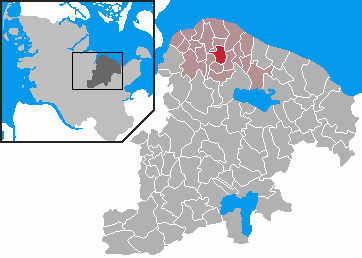
- Location of Fiefbergen within Plön district
- Interactive map of Fiefbergen
- Location within Germany Location within Schleswig-Holstein
- Coordinates: 54°22′51″N 10°20′38″E
- Country: Germany
- State: Schleswig-Holstein
- District: Plön
- Municipal assoc.: Probstei

Government
  - Mayor: Silke Lorenzen

Area
  - Total: 5.8 km^{2} (2.2 sq mi)
- Elevation: 26 m (85 ft)

Population (2025-12-31)
  - Total: 511
  - Density: 88/km^{2} (230/sq mi)
- Time zone: UTC+01:00 (CET)
  - Summer (DST): UTC+02:00 (CEST)
- Postal codes: 24217
- Dialling codes: 04344
- Vehicle registration: PLÖ
- Website: www.amt-probstei.de

Fiefbergen is a municipality in the district of Plön, in Schleswig-Holstein, Germany.
