= Lutterbek =

- Municipality
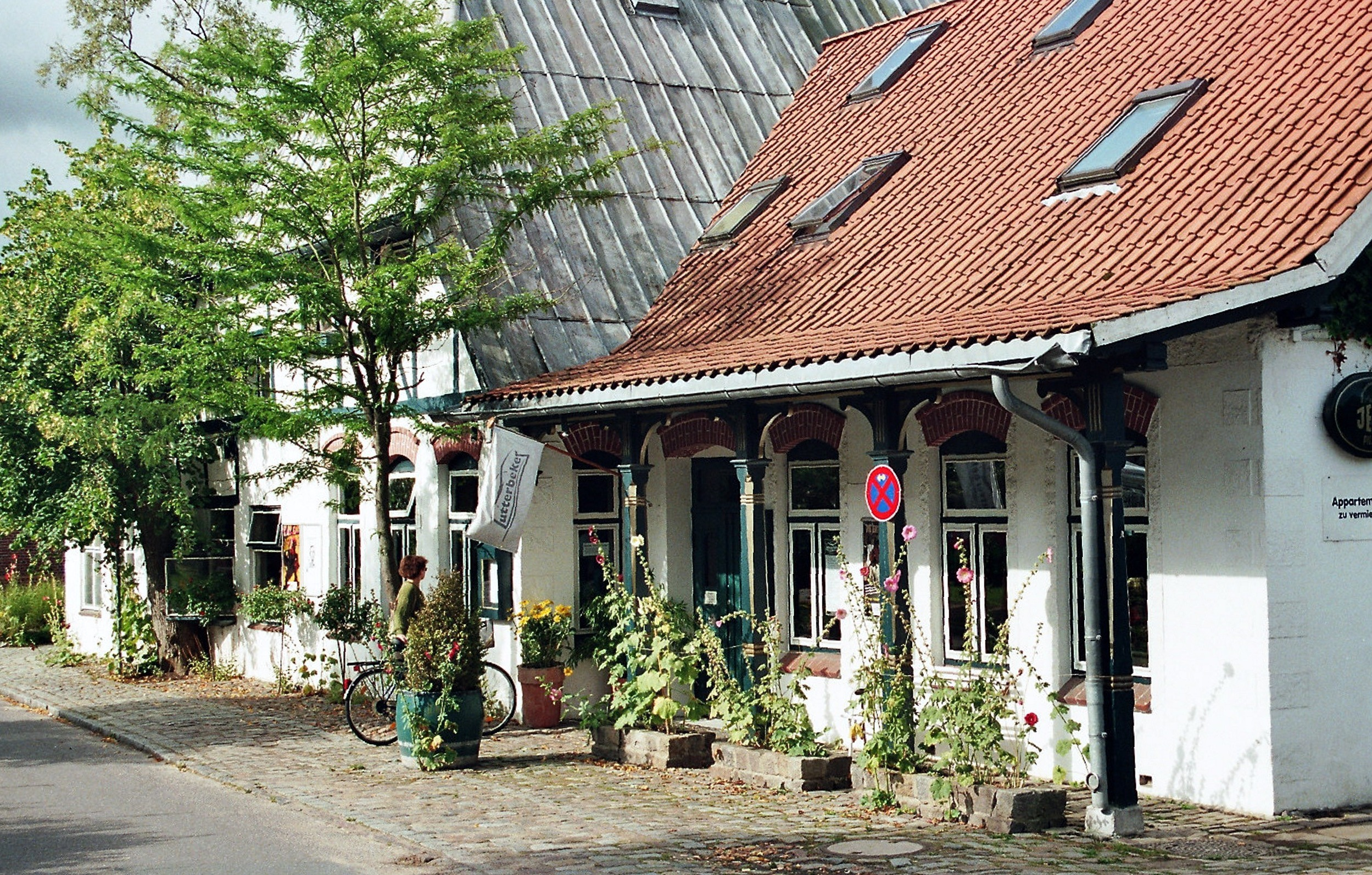

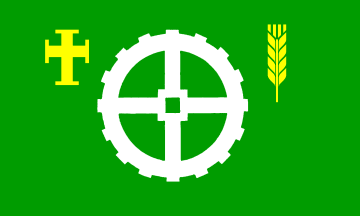
- Flag Coat of arms

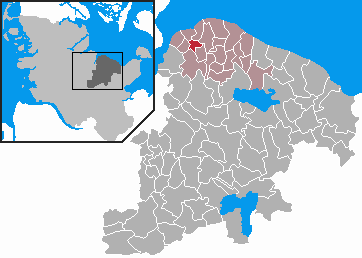
- Location of Lutterbek within Plön district
- Interactive map of Lutterbek
- Location within Germany Location within Schleswig-Holstein
- Coordinates: 54°23′N 10°16′E
- Country: Germany
- State: Schleswig-Holstein
- District: Plön
- Municipal assoc.: Probstei

Government
  - Mayor: Wolf Mönkemeier (FW)

Area
  - Total: 3.23 km^{2} (1.25 sq mi)
- Elevation: 9 m (30 ft)

Population (2025-12-31)
  - Total: 302
  - Density: 93.5/km^{2} (242/sq mi)
- Time zone: UTC+01:00 (CET)
  - Summer (DST): UTC+02:00 (CEST)
- Postal codes: 24235
- Dialling codes: 04343
- Vehicle registration: PLÖ
- Website: www.amt-probstei.de

Lutterbek is a municipality in the district of Plön, in Schleswig-Holstein, Germany.
