= Helmstorf, Schleswig-Holstein =

- Municipality
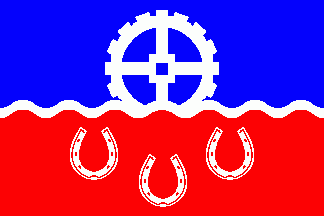
- Flag Coat of arms

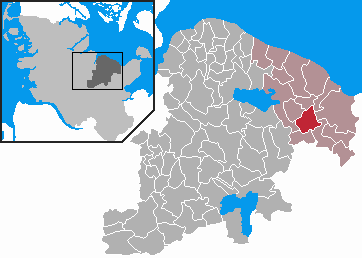
- Location of Helmstorf, Schleswig-Holstein within Plön district
- Interactive map of Helmstorf, Schleswig-Holstein
- Location within Germany Location within Schleswig-Holstein
- Coordinates: 54°17′N 10°36′E
- Country: Germany
- State: Schleswig-Holstein
- District: Plön
- Municipal assoc.: Lütjenburg

Government
  - Mayor: Birgitta Ford

Area
  - Total: 12.73 km^{2} (4.92 sq mi)
- Elevation: 25 m (82 ft)

Population (2025-12-31)
  - Total: 310
  - Density: 24/km^{2} (63/sq mi)
- Time zone: UTC+01:00 (CET)
  - Summer (DST): UTC+02:00 (CEST)
- Postal codes: 24321
- Dialling codes: 04381
- Vehicle registration: PLÖ

Helmstorf is a municipality in the district of Plön, in Schleswig-Holstein, Germany.
