= Barsbek =

- Municipality
- Flag Coat of arms

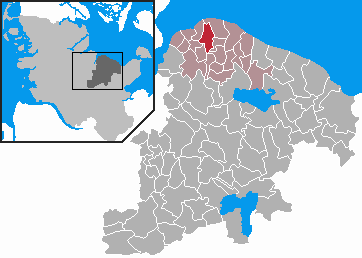
- Location of Barsbek within Plön district
- Interactive map of Barsbek
- Location within Germany Location within Schleswig-Holstein
- Coordinates: 54°23′N 10°19′E
- Country: Germany
- State: Schleswig-Holstein
- District: Plön
- Municipal assoc.: Probstei

Government
  - Mayor: Timo Schlabritz

Area
  - Total: 8.73 km^{2} (3.37 sq mi)
- Elevation: 9 m (30 ft)

Population (2025-12-31)
  - Total: 577
  - Density: 66.1/km^{2} (171/sq mi)
- Time zone: UTC+01:00 (CET)
  - Summer (DST): UTC+02:00 (CEST)
- Postal codes: 24217
- Dialling codes: 04344
- Vehicle registration: PLÖ
- Website: www.barsbek.de

Barsbek is a municipality in the district of Plön, in Schleswig-Holstein, Germany.
