= Laboe =

- Municipality
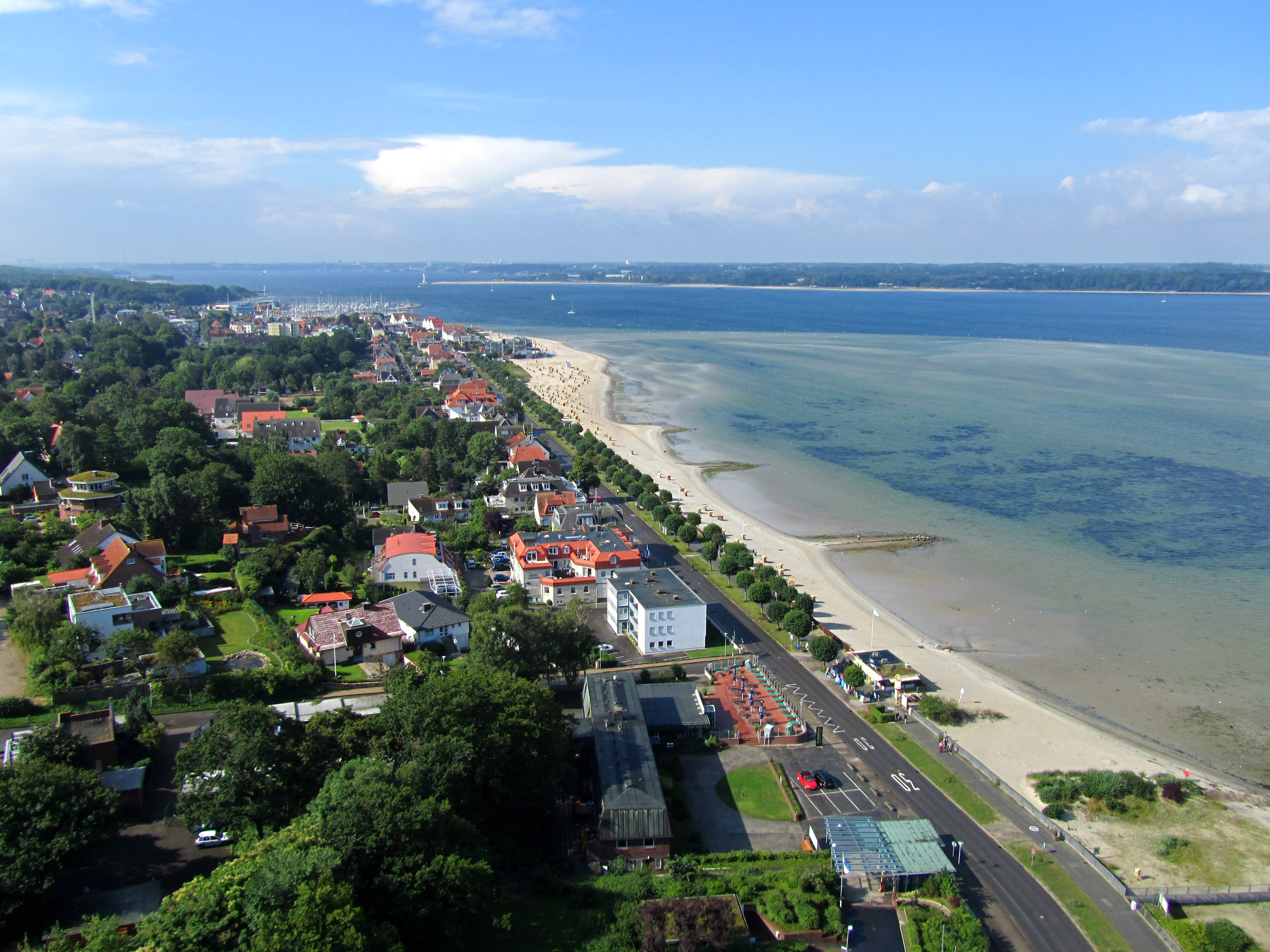
- View from Laboe Naval Memorial southbound

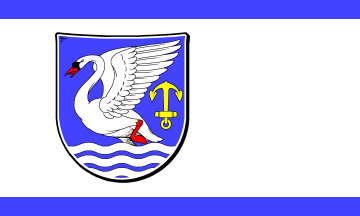
- Flag Coat of arms

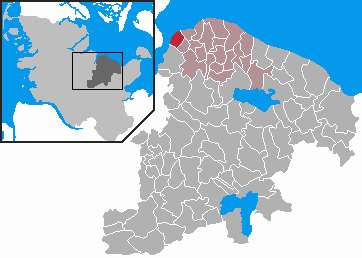
- Location of Laboe within Plön district
- Interactive map of Laboe
- Location within Germany Location within Schleswig-Holstein
- Coordinates: 54°24′32″N 10°13′51″E
- Country: Germany
- State: Schleswig-Holstein
- District: Plön
- Municipal assoc.: Probstei

Government
  - Mayor: Marc Wenzel (Greens)

Area
  - Total: 5.23 km^{2} (2.02 sq mi)
- Elevation: 21 m (69 ft)

Population (2025-12-31)
  - Total: 5,605
  - Density: 1,070/km^{2} (2,780/sq mi)
- Time zone: UTC+01:00 (CET)
  - Summer (DST): UTC+02:00 (CEST)
- Postal codes: 24235
- Dialling codes: 04343, 04382
- Vehicle registration: PLÖ
- Website: www.laboe.de

Laboe (German pronunciation: [laˈbøː]) is a municipality in the district of Plön, in Schleswig-Holstein, Germany. It is situated on the Baltic Sea coast, approximately 10 km northeast of Kiel. The Laboe Naval Memorial is located within the municipality, as is the U-boat U-995.

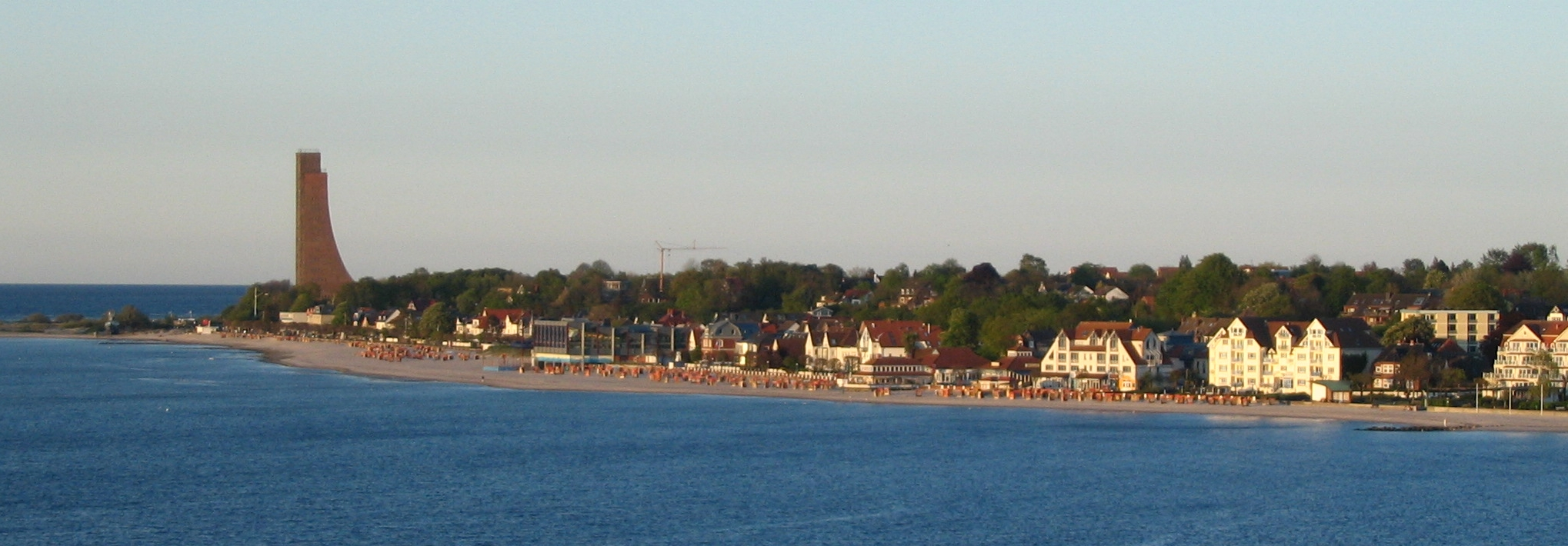
Beach of Laboe, with the recognizable outline of the Laboe Naval Memorial at the left

The city coat of arms depicts a swan and is based on its name, as Laboe means "swan" in the extinct Slavic Polabian language.
