= Wisch, Plön =

Wisch
- Municipality
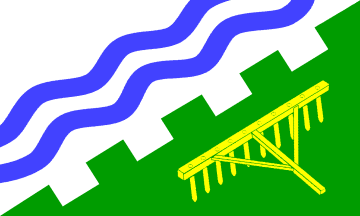
- Flag Coat of arms

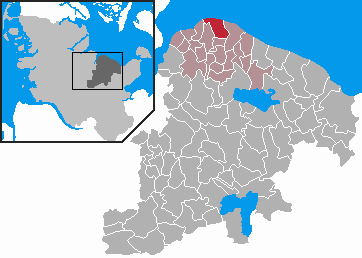
- Location of Wisch within Plön district
- Interactive map of Wisch
- Location within Germany Location within Schleswig-Holstein
- Coordinates: 54°25′N 10°20′E
- Country: Germany
- State: Schleswig-Holstein
- District: Plön
- Municipal assoc.: Probstei

Government
  - Mayor: Verena Sapia

Area
  - Total: 9.18 km^{2} (3.54 sq mi)
- Elevation: 1 m (3.3 ft)

Population (2025-12-31)
  - Total: 640
  - Density: 70/km^{2} (180/sq mi)
- Time zone: UTC+01:00 (CET)
  - Summer (DST): UTC+02:00 (CEST)
- Postal codes: 24217
- Dialling codes: 04344
- Vehicle registration: PLÖ
- Website: www.amt-probstei.de

Wisch (German pronunciation: [vɪʃ]) is a municipality in the district of Plön, in Schleswig-Holstein, Germany.
