= Plön (district) =

Coordinates: 54°15′N 10°25′E

- District
- Flag Coat of arms

- Country: Germany
- State: Schleswig-Holstein
- Capital: Plön

Government
  - District admin.: Stephanie Ladwig (Ind.)

Area
  - Total: 1,082.71 km^{2} (418.04 sq mi)

Population (31 December 2025)
  - Total: 130,318
  - Density: 120.363/km^{2} (311.738/sq mi)
- Time zone: UTC+01:00 (CET)
  - Summer (DST): UTC+02:00 (CEST)
- Vehicle registration: PLÖ
- Website: kreis-ploen.de

Plön (German pronunciation: [ˈpløːn]) is a district in Schleswig-Holstein, Germany. It is bounded by (from the east and clockwise) the districts of Ostholstein and Segeberg, the city of Neumünster, the district of Rendsburg-Eckernförde, the city of Kiel and the Baltic Sea.

== History ==
The district was established in 1867. In 1932 it was enlarged with parts of the dissolved district of Bordesholm. During the 20th century some municipalities left the district due to incorporation into the city of Kiel.

== Geography ==
The inland part of this small district is covered with lakes. The Großer Plöner See ("Great Plön Lake", 29 km^{2}) and the Selenter See ("Lake Selent", 22 km^{2}) are the largest lakes in Schleswig-Holstein. The lakeland and the adjoining parts of the neighbouring district Ostholstein constitute the region called Holstein Switzerland since the countryside is very hilly. However, the highest hill (Bungsberg) is only 168 m high. North of the lakeland there is the Probstei, a region on the coast of the Baltic Sea.

== Coat of arms ==
Coat of arms

The coat of arms displays:
- the nettle leaf from the arms of Holstein
- an oak leaf, symbolising the forests
- a grain ear, symbolising agriculture
- a wavy line and a fish, symbolising the lakelands and the Baltic Sea

== Towns and municipalities ==
Independent towns
1. Plön
2. Preetz
3. Schwentinental
and municipalities
1. Ascheberg
2. Bösdorf

Ämter
1. Bokhorst-Wankendorf; 1. Belau; 2. Bönebüttel; 3. Großharrie; 4. Rendswühren; 5. Ruhwinkel; 6. Schillsdorf; 7. Stolpe; 8. Tasdorf; 9. Wankendorf^{1}; 2. Großer Plöner See [seat: Plön]; 1. Bosau (Ostholstein district); 2. Dersau; 3. Dörnick; 4. Grebin; 5. Kalübbe; 6. Lebrade; 7. Nehmten; 8. Rantzau; 9. Rathjensdorf; 10. Wittmoldt; 3. Lütjenburg; 1. Behrensdorf; 2. Blekendorf; 3. Dannau; 4. Giekau; 5. Helmstorf; 6. Högsdorf; 7. Hohenfelde; 8. Hohwacht; 9. Kirchnüchel; 10. Klamp; 11. Kletkamp; 12. Lütjenburg^{1, 2}; 13. Panker; 14. Schwartbuck; 15. Tröndel	4. Preetz-Land; 1. Barmissen; 2. Boksee; 3. Bothkamp; 4. Großbarkau; 5. Honigsee; 6. Kirchbarkau; 7. Klein Barkau; 8. Kühren; 9. Lehmkuhlen; 10. Löptin; 11. Nettelsee; 12. Pohnsdorf; 13. Postfeld; 14. Rastorf; 15. Schellhorn^{1}; 16. Wahlstorf; 17. Warnau; 5. Probstei; 1. Barsbek; 2. Bendfeld; 3. Brodersdorf; 4. Fahren; 5. Fiefbergen; 6. Höhndorf; 7. Köhn; 8. Krokau; 9. Krummbek; 10. Laboe; 11. Lutterbek; 12. Passade; 13. Prasdorf; 14. Probsteierhagen; 15. Schönberg^{1}; 16. Stakendorf; 17. Stein; 18. Stoltenberg; 19. Wendtorf; 20. Wisch	6. Schrevenborn; 1. Heikendorf^{1}; 2. Mönkeberg; 3. Schönkirchen; 7. Selent/Schlesen; 1. Dobersdorf; 2. Fargau-Pratjau; 3. Lammershagen; 4. Martensrade; 5. Mucheln; 6. Schlesen; 7. Selent^{1}
^{1}seat of the Amt; ^{2}town

== Map of municipalities and Ämter ==
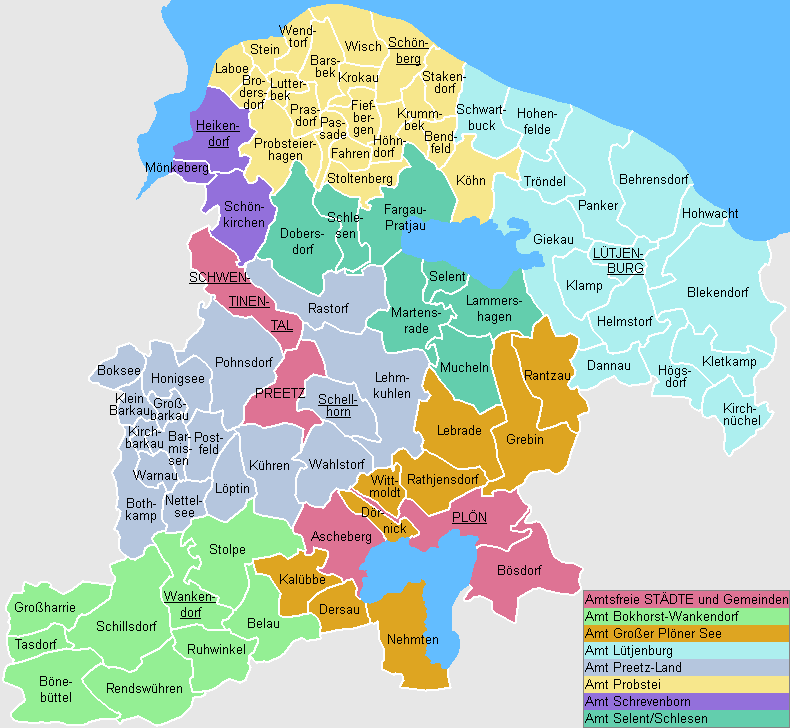
