= Buchwald =

Buchwald is a German and Jewish surname. Notable people with the surname include:

- Art Buchwald (1925–2007), American humorist
- Charles Buchwald (1880–1951), Danish amateur footballer
- Dave Buchwald (born 1970), Computer hacker, filmmaker, artist
- David Buchwald (born 1970), American politician
- Dedra Buchwald, American epidemiologist, doctor, and professor
- Ephraim Buchwald, American Orthodox rabbi
- Gerhard Buchwald (1920–2009), German medical doctor and vaccination critic
- Guido Buchwald (born 1961), German footballer and manager
- Harold Buchwald (1928–2008), Canadian lawyer
- Jed Buchwald, American historian
- Manuel Buchwald (born 1940), Peruvian-Canadian geneticist and academic
- Naomi Reice Buchwald (born 1944), American jurist, federal judge
- Nathaniel Buchwald (1890–1956), American cultural critic and translator
- Nathaniel A. Buchwald (1924–2006), American neuroscientist, educator and administrator
- Péter Bakonyi (Buchwald) (born 1938), Hungarian Olympic fencer
- Stephen Buchwald (born 1955), American chemist

== See also ==
- Groß Buchwald, a municipality in the district of Rendsburg-Eckernförde, in Schleswig-Holstein
- 3209 Buchwald, main-belt asteroid
- Buchenwald (disambiguation)
