= Mühbrook =

- Municipality
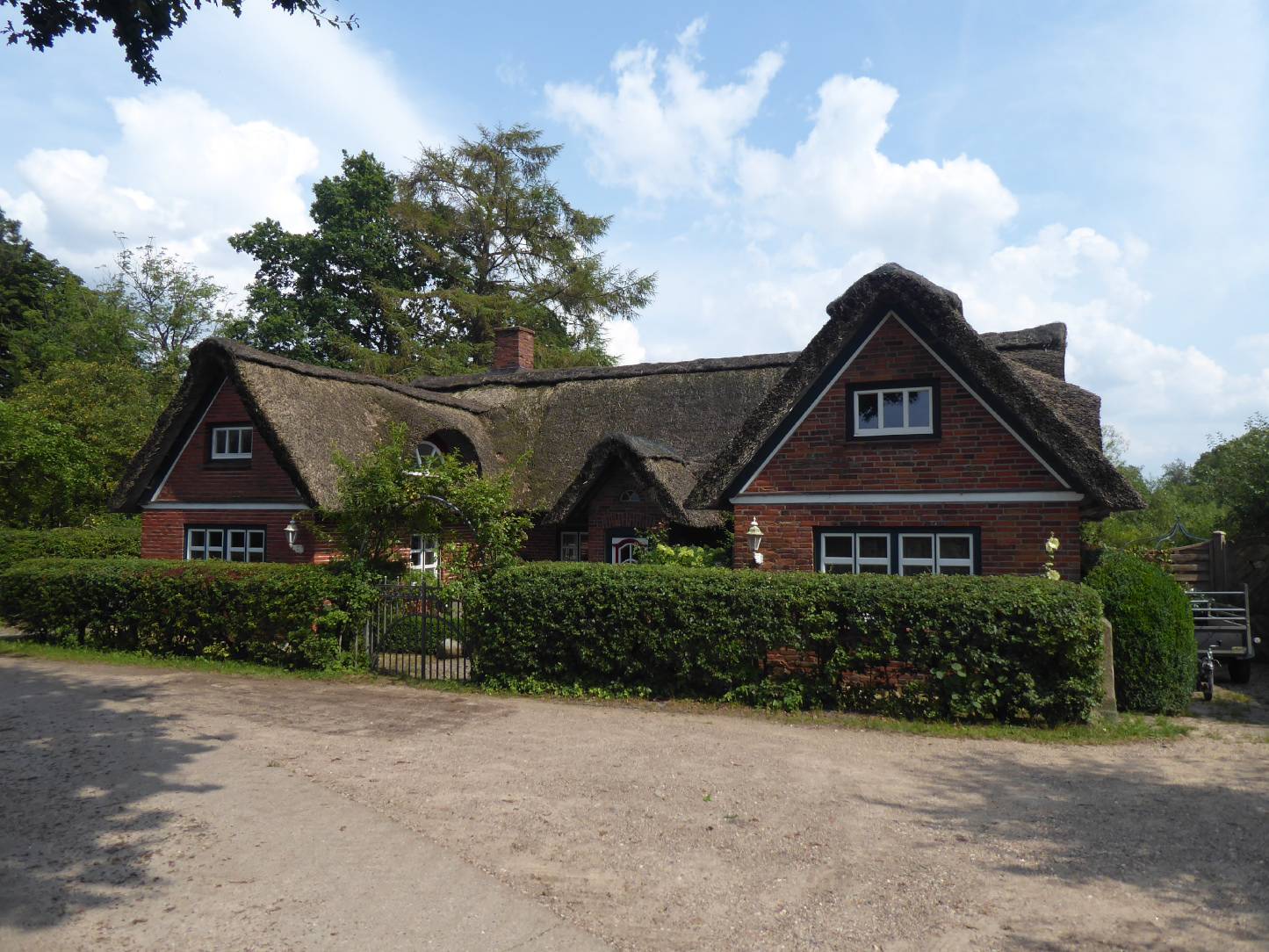

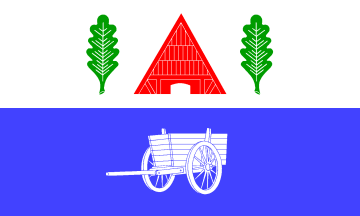
- Flag Coat of arms

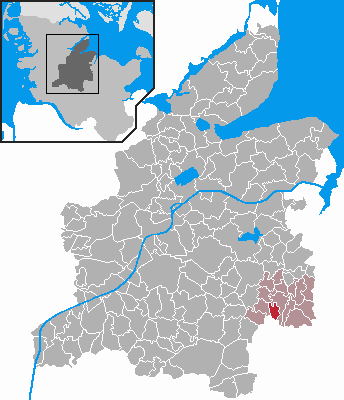
- Location of Mühbrook within Rendsburg-Eckernförde district
- Interactive map of Mühbrook
- Location within Germany Location within Schleswig-Holstein
- Coordinates: 54°10′N 10°0′E
- Country: Germany
- State: Schleswig-Holstein
- District: Rendsburg-Eckernförde
- Municipal assoc.: Bordesholm

Government
  - Mayor: Wulf Klüver

Area
  - Total: 5.30 km^{2} (2.05 sq mi)
- Elevation: 28 m (92 ft)

Population (2025-12-31)
  - Total: 528
  - Density: 99.6/km^{2} (258/sq mi)
- Time zone: UTC+01:00 (CET)
  - Summer (DST): UTC+02:00 (CEST)
- Postal codes: 24582
- Dialling codes: 04322
- Vehicle registration: RD
- Website: www.muehbrook.de

Mühbrook is a municipality in the district of Rendsburg-Eckernförde, in Schleswig-Holstein, Germany. The village is located at the Einfelder See between Neumünster and Bordesholm.

The 5.3 square kilometer large municipal area reaches to the Bordesholmer See in the north and includes the village Hohenhorst.
