= Christiane of Saxe-Merseburg =

German noblewoman (1659–1679)

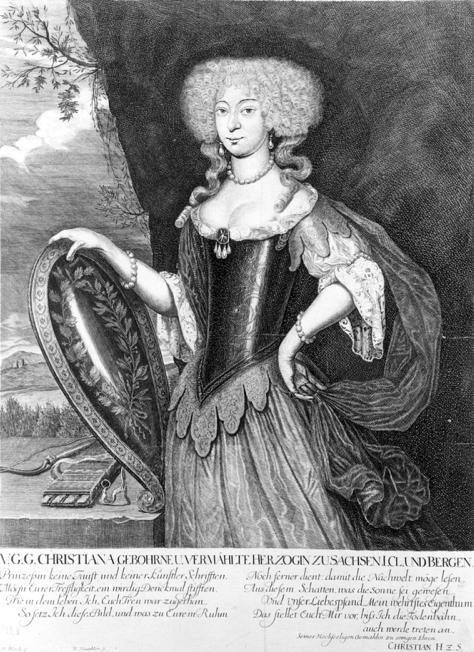
- Christiane of Saxe-Merseburg, Duchess of Saxe-Eisenberg (probably in the allegorical representation of hunting goddess Diana), painted ca. 1678, now in the Kupferstichkabinett (Collection of Prints, Drawings and Photographs) of the Staatliche Kunstsammlungen Dresden (Dresden State Art Collections).
- Born: 1 June 1659; Merseburg
- Died: 13 March 1679 (aged 19); Eisenberg
- Noble family: House of Wettin
- Spouse: Christian, Duke of Saxe-Eisenberg
- Issue: Christiane, Duchess of Schleswig-Holstein-Glücksburg
- Father: Christian I, Duke of Saxe-Merseburg
- Mother: Christiana of Schleswig-Holstein-Sonderburg-Glücksburg

Christiane of Saxe-Merseburg (1 June 1659 – 13 March 1679), was a German noblewoman member of the House of Wettin and by marriage Duchess of Saxe-Gotha-Altenburg.

Born in Merseburg, she was a child of Christian I, Duke of Saxe-Merseburg and his wife Christiana of Schleswig-Holstein-Sonderburg-Glücksburg.

== Life ==
In Merseburg on 13 February 1677 Christiane married Duke Christian of Saxe-Gotha-Altenburg. Both belonged to the House of Wettin: she was a member of the Albertine line while her husband belonged to the Ernestine branch. The couple settled in Eisenberg at the Christianburg Castle.

Two years later, on 4 March 1679, she gave birth to a daughter, named Christiane after her and later wife of Philip Ernst, Duke of Schleswig-Holstein-Glücksburg; however, nine days later (13 March) she died of childbirth complications aged 19, probably from puerperal fever. She was buried in Merseburg Cathedral. In her honour, her husband build the Castle church of St. Trinity (German: Schlosskirche St. Trinitatis) in the Christianburg Castle.

== Notes ==
Christiane of Saxe-Merseburg House of Wettin Born: 1 June 1659 Died: 13 March 1679
German royalty
New creation	Duchess consort of Saxe-Eisenberg (titular); 1677–1679	Vacant Title next held by Sophie Marie of Hesse-Darmstadt
