= Christian, Duke of Saxe-Eisenberg =

Christian
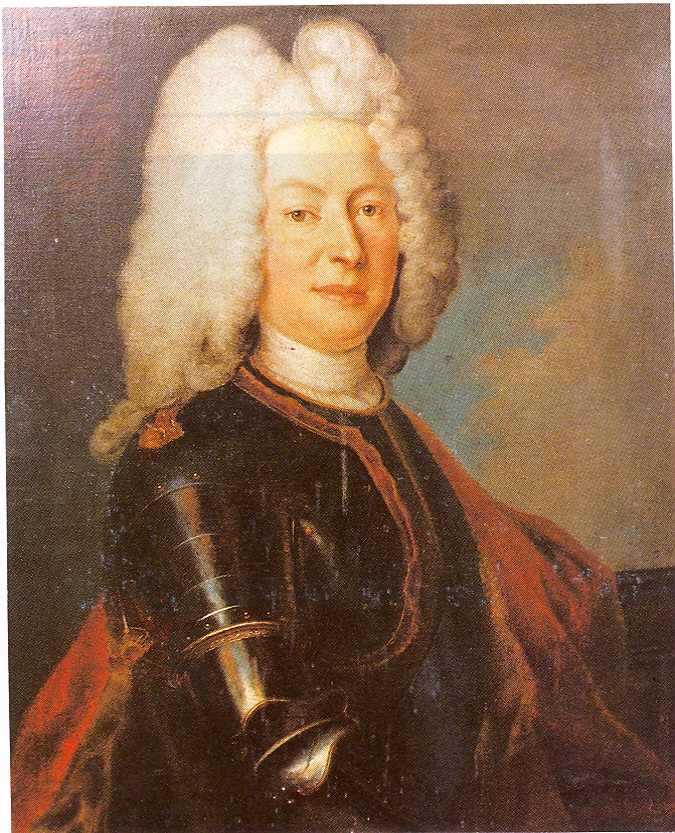
- Portrait, late 17th/early 18th century

Duke of Saxe-Eisenberg
- Reign: 1675–1707
- Predecessor: New Creation
- Successor: Disputed
- Born: 6 January 1653; Gotha
- Died: 28 April 1707 (aged 54); Eisenberg
- Spouse: Christiane of Saxe-Merseburg; Sophie Marie of Hesse-Darmstadt
- Issue: Christiane, Duchess of Schleswig-Holstein-Glücksburg
- House: House of Wettin
- Father: Ernst I, Duke of Saxe-Coburg-Altenburg
- Mother: Elisabeth Sophie of Saxe-Altenburg

Christian of Saxe-Eisenberg (6 January 1653 – 28 April 1707) was a duke of Saxe-Eisenberg.

He was born in Gotha, the eighth, but fifth surviving, son of Ernst I, Duke of Saxe-Coburg-Altenburg and Elisabeth Sophie of Saxe-Altenburg.

Christian had traveled far in his youth and was interested early in History and Art. After the death of his father in 1675, he governed together with his brothers over Saxe-Gotha. He made Eisenberg his residence, where in 1677 he built the Schloss Christiansburg. After the divisionary treaty of the duchy in 1680, Christian retained Eisenberg and the towns of Ronneburg, Roda and Camburg. During his last years he was very interested in alchemy.

He died in Eisenberg, with considerable debts, and, like his brothers Albrecht of Saxe-Coburg and Heinrich of Saxe-Römhild, without sons. His lands were disputed between his remaining brothers and their descendants in the "Coburg-Eisenberg-Römhild inheritance dispute", which took until 1735 to be resolved.

== Issue ==
In Merseburg on 13 February 1677, Christian married firstly with Christiane of Saxe-Merseburg. They had only one daughter:

1. Christiane (b. Eisenach, 4 March 1679 – d. Glücksburg, 24 May 1722), who was married on 15 February 1699 to Philip Ernst, Duke of Schleswig-Holstein-Glücksburg (1673–1729), grandson of Philip, Duke of Schleswig-Holstein-Sonderburg-Glücksburg. Their son Duke Frederick of Schleswig-Holstein-Glücksburg (1 April 1701 - 27 November 1766) married Henriette Auguste, daughter of Simon Henry Adolph, Count of Lippe-Detmold. They had a son, Frederick William Henry (the last of the line, who married Anna Caroline, daughter of William Henry, Prince of Nassau-Saarbrücken) and a daughter, Louise Charlotte (who married Karl George Lebrecht, Prince of Anhalt-Köthen).

In Darmstadt, on 9 February 1681, Christian married secondly with Sophie Marie of Hesse-Darmstadt. They had no children.

== Ancestry ==
Ancestors of Christian, Duke of Saxe-Eisenberg

8. Johann Wilhelm, Duke of Saxe-Weimar
4. John II, Duke of Saxe-Weimar
9. Dorothea Susanne of Simmern
2. Ernest I, Duke of Saxe-Gotha
10. Joachim Ernest, Prince of Anhalt
5. Dorothea Maria of Anhalt
11. Eleonore of Württemberg
1. Christian, Duke of Saxe-Eisenberg
12. Frederick Wilhelm I, Duke of Saxe-Weimar
6. Johann Philipp, Duke of Saxe-Altenburg
13. Anna Maria of the Palatinate-Neuburg
3. Elisabeth Sophie of Saxe-Altenburg
14. Henry Julius, Duke of Brunswick-Lüneburg
7. Elisabeth of Brünswick-Wolfenbüttel
15. Elizabeth of Denmark
