= Schmalstede =

- Municipality
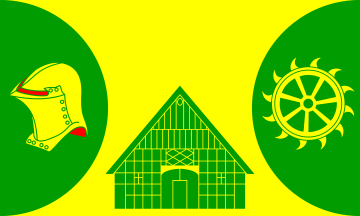
- Flag Coat of arms

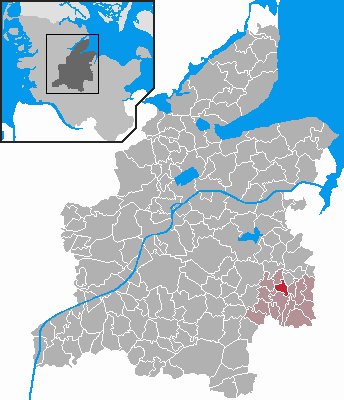
- Location of Schmalstede within Rendsburg-Eckernförde district
- Interactive map of Schmalstede
- Location within Germany Location within Schleswig-Holstein
- Coordinates: 54°12′N 10°2′E
- Country: Germany
- State: Schleswig-Holstein
- District: Rendsburg-Eckernförde
- Municipal assoc.: Bordesholm

Government
  - Mayor: Inge Mordhorst

Area
  - Total: 4.81 km^{2} (1.86 sq mi)
- Elevation: 20 m (66 ft)

Population (2025-12-31)
  - Total: 288
  - Density: 59.9/km^{2} (155/sq mi)
- Time zone: UTC+01:00 (CET)
  - Summer (DST): UTC+02:00 (CEST)
- Postal codes: 24241
- Dialling codes: 04322
- Vehicle registration: RD
- Website: www.bordesholm.de

Schmalstede (German pronunciation: [ʃmaːlˈʃteːdə]) is a municipality in the district of Rendsburg-Eckernförde, in Schleswig-Holstein, Germany.
