= Johann Michael Heineccius =

German preacher and theologian

Johann Michael Heineccius

Johann Michael Heineccius (14 December 1674 – 11 September 1722) was a well-known German preacher and theologian, the brother of Johann Gottlieb Heineccius. He was born in Eisenberg, Thuringia.

He was made pastor at the Liebfrauenkirche (also known as the Marktkirche) in Halle, where his role was to supervise the music at the local church and write cantata texts.

But he is remembered more from the fact that he was the first to make a systematic study of seals, concerning which he left a book, De veteribus Germanorum aliarumque nationum sigillis (Leipzig, 1710; and ed., 1719).
