= Reesdorf, Schleswig-Holstein =

Reesdorf
- Municipality
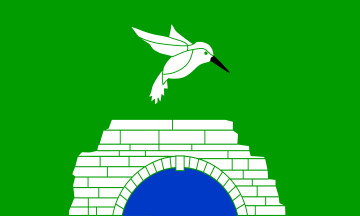
- Flag Coat of arms

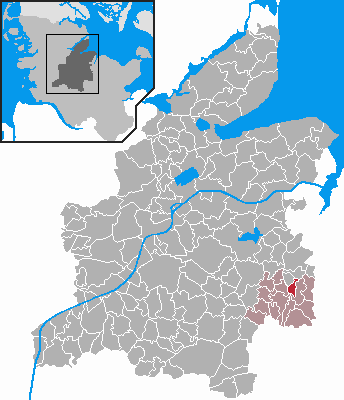
- Location of Reesdorf within Rendsburg-Eckernförde district
- Interactive map of Reesdorf
- Location within Germany Location within Schleswig-Holstein
- Coordinates: 54°11′N 10°3′E
- Country: Germany
- State: Schleswig-Holstein
- District: Rendsburg-Eckernförde
- Municipal assoc.: Bordesholm

Government
  - Mayor: Bernd Jamrath

Area
  - Total: 3.07 km^{2} (1.19 sq mi)
- Elevation: 24 m (79 ft)

Population (2025-12-31)
  - Total: 138
  - Density: 45.0/km^{2} (116/sq mi)
- Time zone: UTC+01:00 (CET)
  - Summer (DST): UTC+02:00 (CEST)
- Postal codes: 24241
- Dialling codes: 04322
- Vehicle registration: RD

Reesdorf is a municipality in the district of Rendsburg-Eckernförde, in Schleswig-Holstein, Germany.
