= Bordesholm (Amt) =

- Amt
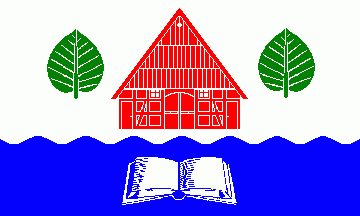
- Flag Coat of arms

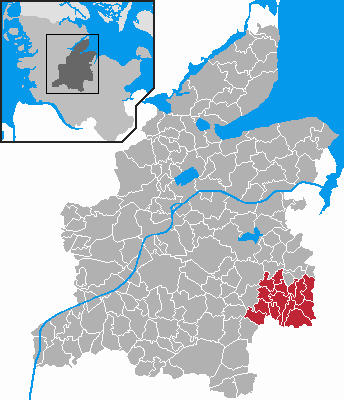
- Map of Rendsburg-Eckernförde highlighting Bordesholm
- Interactive map of Bordesholm
- Location within Germany Location within Schleswig-Holstein
- Coordinates: 54°11′N 10°01′E
- Country: Germany
- State: Schleswig-Holstein
- District: Rendsburg-Eckernförde
- Seat: Bordesholm
- Subdivisions: 14 municipalities

Government
  - Mayor: Torsten Teegen

Area
  - Total: 99.63 km^{2} (38.47 sq mi)

Population (2025-12-31)
  - Total: 14,835
  - Density: 148.9/km^{2} (385.7/sq mi)
- Time zone: UTC+01:00 (CET)
  - Summer (DST): UTC+02:00 (CEST)
- Website: www.bordesholm.de

Bordesholm is an Amt ("collective municipality") in the district of Rendsburg-Eckernförde, in Schleswig-Holstein, Germany. It is situated around the village Bordesholm, which is the seat of the Amt. It was created on 1 July when the municipality Bordesholm joined the former Amt Bordesholm-Land.

== Subdivision ==
The Amt Bordesholm consists of the following municipalities:

1. Bissee
2. Bordesholm
3. Brügge
4. Grevenkrug
5. Groß Buchwald
6. Hoffeld
7. Loop
8. Mühbrook
9. Negenharrie
10. Reesdorf
11. Schmalstede
12. Schönbek
13. Sören
14. Wattenbek
