= Buchenwald (disambiguation) =

Buchenwald is the German for "beechwood forest". It may also refer to:

- Buchenwald concentration camp, a German concentration camp in World War II
- Buchenhochwald, a forest in the Elm hills in Lower Saxony, Germany
- A German name for the Hungarian region Bakony Forest
- Buchenwald (album), 1981 album by the band Whitehouse
- Kibbutz Buchenwald, the original name of Netzer Sereni.

== See also ==
- Buchwald
