= Wattenbek =

- Municipality
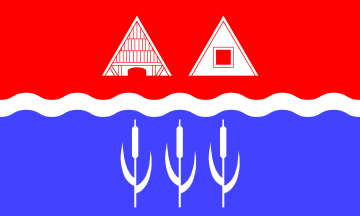
- Flag Coat of arms

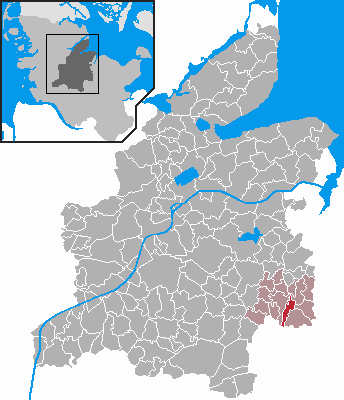
- Location of Wattenbek within Rendsburg-Eckernförde district
- Interactive map of Wattenbek
- Location within Germany Location within Schleswig-Holstein
- Coordinates: 54°10′N 10°3′E
- Country: Germany
- State: Schleswig-Holstein
- District: Rendsburg-Eckernförde
- Municipal assoc.: Bordesholm

Government
  - Mayor: Uwe Bräse

Area
  - Total: 6.05 km^{2} (2.34 sq mi)
- Elevation: 30 m (98 ft)

Population (2025-12-31)
  - Total: 2,933
  - Density: 485/km^{2} (1,260/sq mi)
- Time zone: UTC+01:00 (CET)
  - Summer (DST): UTC+02:00 (CEST)
- Postal codes: 24582
- Dialling codes: 04322
- Vehicle registration: RD
- Website: www.bordesholm.de

Wattenbek (German pronunciation: [ˈvatn̩beːk]) is a municipality in the district of Rendsburg-Eckernförde, in Schleswig-Holstein, Germany.
