= Grevenkrug =

- Municipality
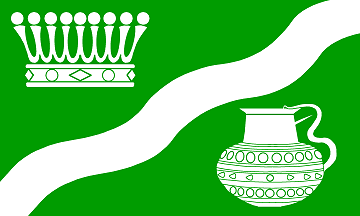
- Flag Coat of arms

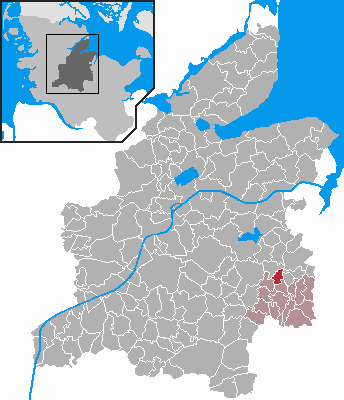
- Location of Grevenkrug within Rendsburg-Eckernförde district
- Interactive map of Grevenkrug
- Location within Germany Location within Schleswig-Holstein
- Coordinates: 54°13′N 10°1′E
- Country: Germany
- State: Schleswig-Holstein
- District: Rendsburg-Eckernförde
- Municipal assoc.: Bordesholm

Government
  - Mayor: Klaus Gronau

Area
  - Total: 4.16 km^{2} (1.61 sq mi)
- Elevation: 36 m (118 ft)

Population (2025-12-31)
  - Total: 211
  - Density: 50.7/km^{2} (131/sq mi)
- Time zone: UTC+01:00 (CET)
  - Summer (DST): UTC+02:00 (CEST)
- Postal codes: 24241
- Dialling codes: 04322
- Vehicle registration: RD
- Website: www.bordesholm.de

Grevenkrug is a municipality in the district of Rendsburg-Eckernförde, in Schleswig-Holstein, Germany.
