= Loop, Germany =

Loop
- Municipality
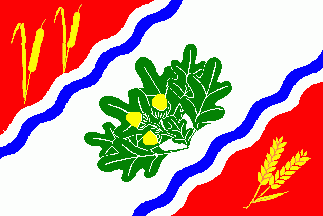
- Flag Coat of arms

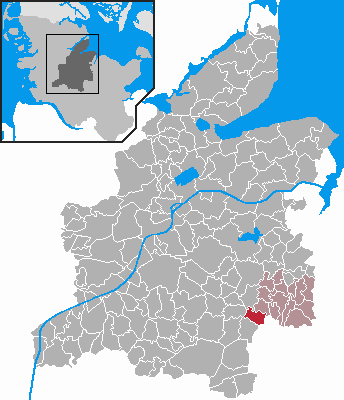
- Location of Loop within Rendsburg-Eckernförde district
- Interactive map of Loop
- Location within Germany Location within Schleswig-Holstein
- Coordinates: 54°8′56″N 9°57′2″E
- Country: Germany
- State: Schleswig-Holstein
- District: Rendsburg-Eckernförde
- Municipal assoc.: Bordesholm

Government
  - Mayor: Torsten Teegen

Area
  - Total: 8.35 km^{2} (3.22 sq mi)
- Elevation: 33 m (108 ft)

Population (2025-12-31)
  - Total: 192
  - Density: 23.0/km^{2} (59.6/sq mi)
- Time zone: UTC+01:00 (CET)
  - Summer (DST): UTC+02:00 (CEST)
- Postal codes: 24644
- Dialling codes: 04322
- Vehicle registration: RD
- Website: www.bordesholm.de

Loop (German pronunciation: [loːp]) is a municipality in the district of Rendsburg-Eckernförde, in Schleswig-Holstein, Germany.
