= Schönbek =

- Municipality
- Coat of arms

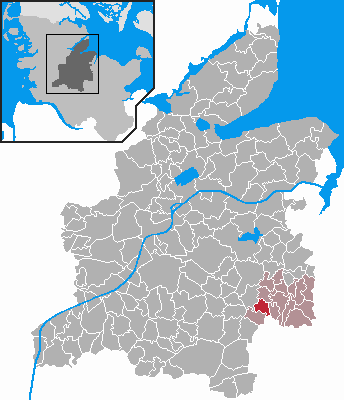
- Location of Schönbek within Rendsburg-Eckernförde district
- Interactive map of Schönbek
- Location within Germany Location within Schleswig-Holstein
- Coordinates: 54°10′N 9°58′E
- Country: Germany
- State: Schleswig-Holstein
- District: Rendsburg-Eckernförde
- Municipal assoc.: Bordesholm

Government
  - Mayor: Otto Braker

Area
  - Total: 6.13 km^{2} (2.37 sq mi)
- Elevation: 34 m (112 ft)

Population (2025-12-31)
  - Total: 214
  - Density: 34.9/km^{2} (90.4/sq mi)
- Time zone: UTC+01:00 (CET)
  - Summer (DST): UTC+02:00 (CEST)
- Postal codes: 24582
- Dialling codes: 04322
- Vehicle registration: RD
- Website: www.bordesholm.de

Schönbek (German pronunciation: [ˈʃøːnbeːk]) is a municipality in the Bordesholm Amt in the district of Rendsburg-Eckernförde, in Schleswig-Holstein, Germany.
