= Bissee =

- Municipality
- Flag Coat of arms

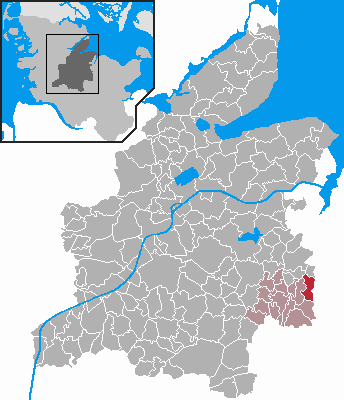
- Location of Bissee within Rendsburg-Eckernförde district
- Interactive map of Bissee
- Location within Germany Location within Schleswig-Holstein
- Coordinates: 54°10′N 10°7′E
- Country: Germany
- State: Schleswig-Holstein
- District: Rendsburg-Eckernförde
- Municipal assoc.: Bordesholm

Government
  - Mayor: Sönke Harmann

Area
  - Total: 9.27 km^{2} (3.58 sq mi)
- Elevation: 44 m (144 ft)

Population (2025-12-31)
  - Total: 160
  - Density: 17/km^{2} (45/sq mi)
- Time zone: UTC+01:00 (CET)
  - Summer (DST): UTC+02:00 (CEST)
- Postal codes: 24582
- Dialling codes: 04322
- Vehicle registration: RD
- Website: www.bordesholm.de

Bissee is a municipality in the district of Rendsburg-Eckernförde, in Schleswig-Holstein, Germany.
