= Gunter Stein =

German-American electrical engineer (1941–2026)

- Born: July 16, 1941; Bordesholm, Gau Schleswig-Holstein, Germany
- Died: July 11, 2026 (aged 84); Saint Paul, Minnesota, U.S.
- Education: General Motors Institute; Purdue University
- Occupation: Electrical engineer
- Spouse: Nancy Diane (died 2006)

Gunter Stein (July 16, 1941 – July 11, 2026) was a German-American electrical engineer.

== Early life and career ==
Stein was born in Bordesholm on July 16, 1941, the son of Georg and Kate Stein. He and his family emigrated to the United States in 1954. He attended General Motors Institute, earning his BS degree. He also attended Purdue University, earning his PhD degree in electrical engineering.

He worked at Honeywell for fifty years, and was an adjunct professor at the Massachusetts Institute of Technology for twenty years. In 1985, he was named a fellow of the Institute of Electrical and Electronics Engineers, "for leadership in making modern control theory and its application practical", and in 1994, he was elected as a member of the National Academy of Engineering.

== Personal life and death ==
Stein was married to Nancy Diane. Their marriage lasted until her death in 2006. After the death of his first wife, he was the partner of Ann Wynia, whose relationship lasted until Stein's death in 2026.

Stein died in Saint Paul, Minnesota, on July 11, 2026, at the age of 84.
