= Hoffeld, Schleswig-Holstein =

Hoffeld
- Municipality
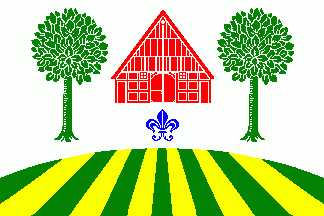
- Flag Coat of arms

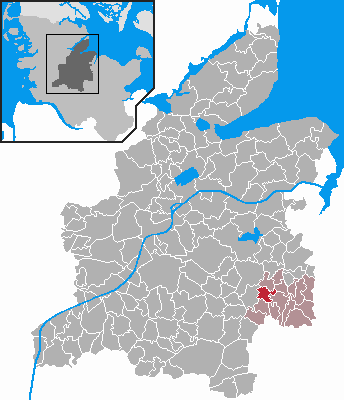
- Location of Hoffeld within Rendsburg-Eckernförde district
- Interactive map of Hoffeld
- Location within Germany Location within Schleswig-Holstein
- Coordinates: 54°12′N 10°0′E
- Country: Germany
- State: Schleswig-Holstein
- District: Rendsburg-Eckernförde
- Municipal assoc.: Bordesholm

Government
  - Mayor: Sönke Harder

Area
  - Total: 6.62 km^{2} (2.56 sq mi)
- Elevation: 38 m (125 ft)

Population (2025-12-31)
  - Total: 178
  - Density: 26.9/km^{2} (69.6/sq mi)
- Time zone: UTC+01:00 (CET)
  - Summer (DST): UTC+02:00 (CEST)
- Postal codes: 24582
- Dialling codes: 04322
- Vehicle registration: RD
- Website: www.bordesholm.de

Hoffeld is a municipality in the district of Rendsburg-Eckernförde, in Schleswig-Holstein, Germany.
