= Sophie Marie of Hesse-Darmstadt =

Duchess of Saxe-Eisenberg (1661–1712)

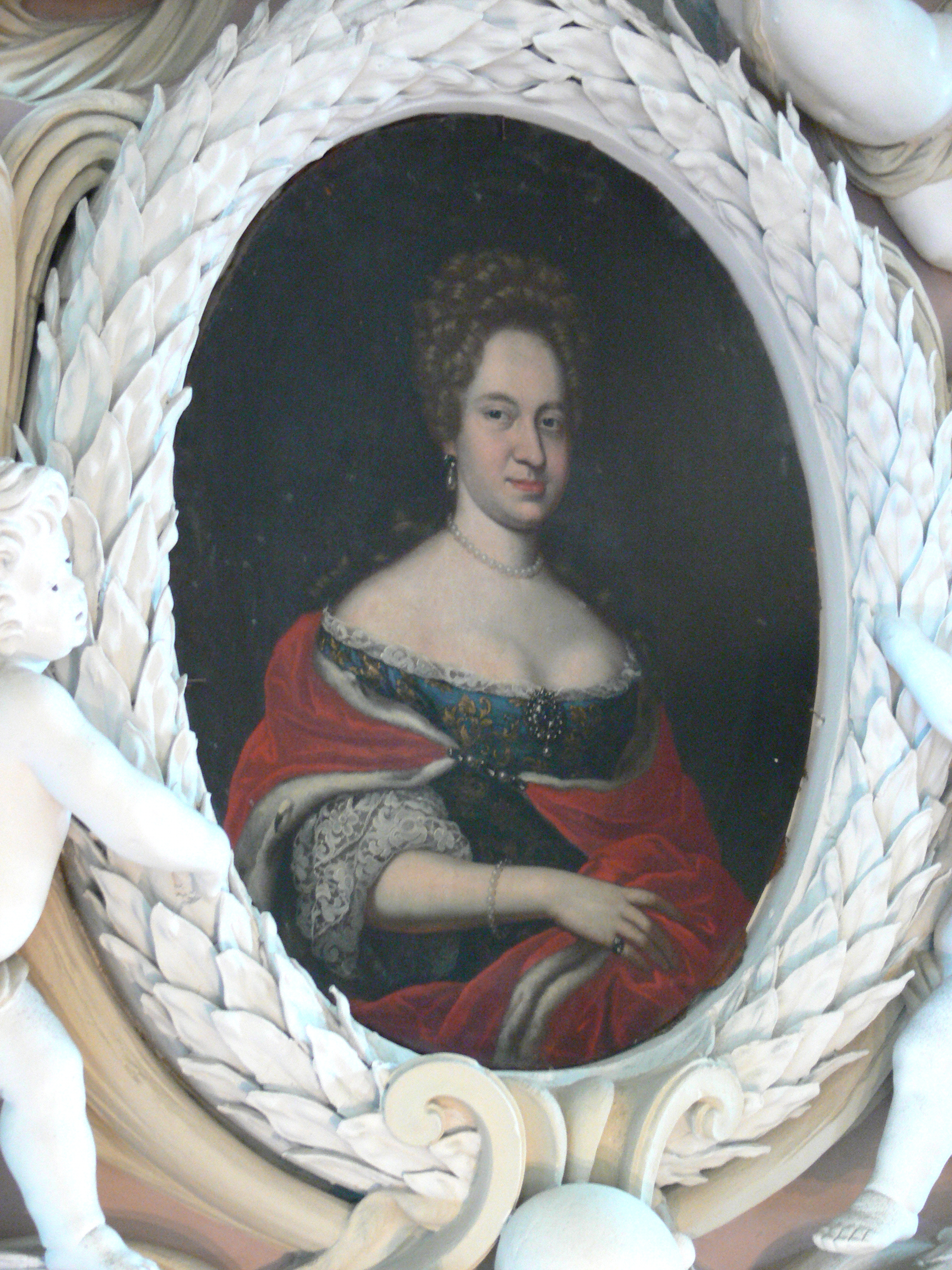
- Born: 7 May 1661; Darmstadt
- Died: 22 August 1712 (aged 51); Gotha
- Spouse: Christian, Duke of Saxe-Eisenberg
- Father: Louis VI of Hesse-Darmstadt
- Mother: Maria Elisabeth of Holstein-Gottorp

Sophie Marie of Hesse-Darmstadt (7 May 1661 – 22 August 1712) was a member of the House of Hesse and by marriage Duchess of Saxe-Eisenberg.

== Life ==
Sophie Marie was born in Darmstadt, a daughter of Count Louis VI of Hesse-Darmstadt (1630–1678) from his marriage to Maria Elisabeth of Holstein-Gottorp (1634–1665), a daughter of Duke Frederick III of Holstein-Gottorp.

On 9 February 1681 in Darmstadt, she married Duke Christian of Saxe-Eisenberg. At the time, he was a widower and father of a daughter. He had become the first Duke of Saxe-Eisenberg when Saxe-Gotha had been divided by Christian and his six brothers the year before. They had no children and Christian died without leaving an heir. A dispute erupted among the remaining brothers and their descendants about he inheritance of Saxe-Eisenberg.

The Duchess was described as a very hard-working housewife, with a particular fondness for spinning. Disguised as an ordinary woman, she supplied local merchants with wool and yarn. She died in Gotha.

== Notes ==
Princess Louise of Denmark House of Hesse Born: 7 May 1661 Died: 22 August 1712
German royalty
Vacant Title last held by Christiane of Saxe-Merseburg	Duchess consort of Saxe-Eisenberg; 1681-1707	Merged to the Duchy of Saxe-Gotha-Altenburg
