= Johann Gottlieb Heineccius =

German jurist (1681–1741)

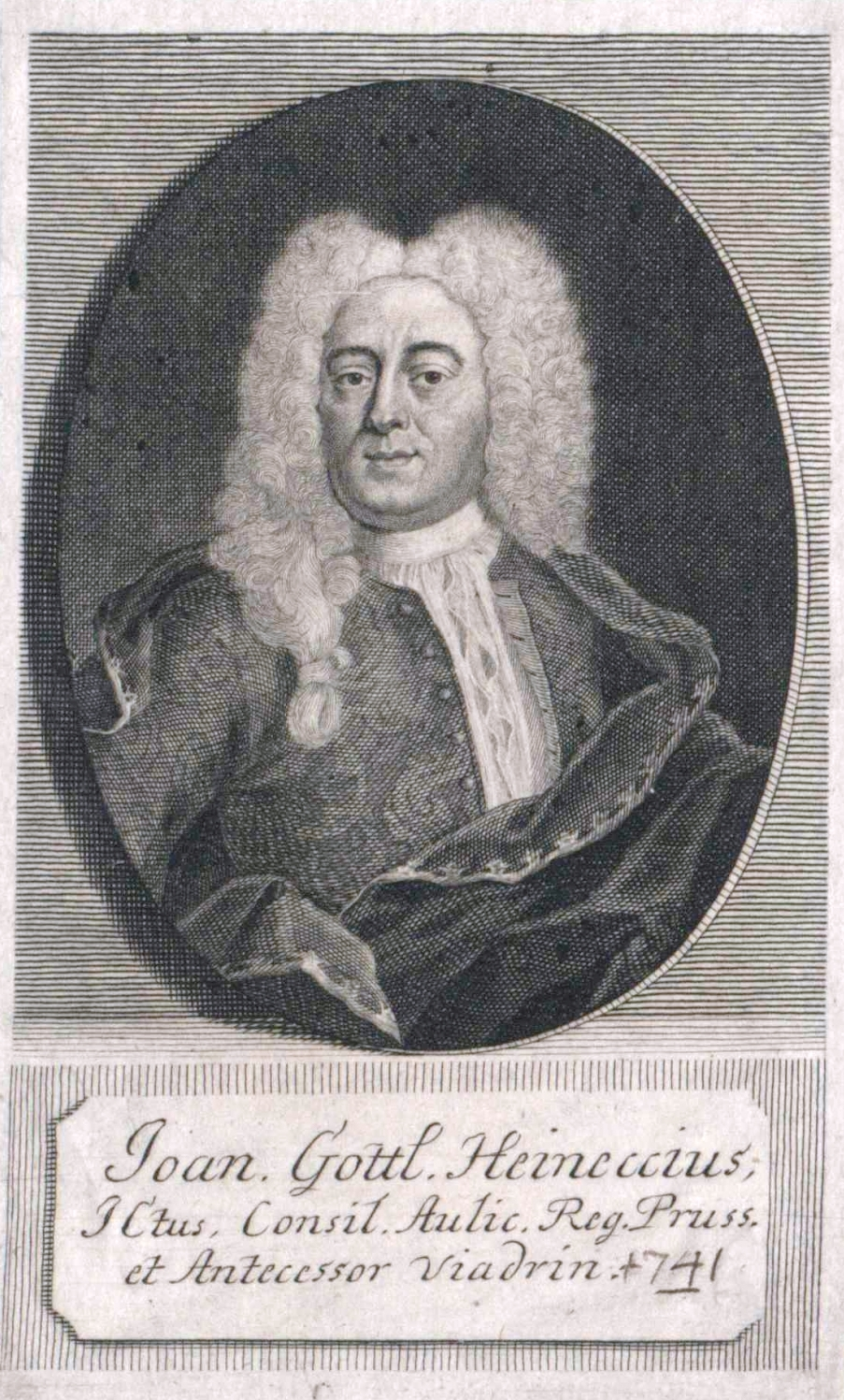
- Johann Gottlieb Heineccius.
- Born: September 11, 1681; Eisenberg
- Died: August 31, 1741 (aged 59); Halle
- Education: Leipzig; University of Halle
- Scientific career
- Fields: Jurisprudence
- Institutions: University of Halle

Johann Gottlieb Heineccius (September 11, 1681 – August 31, 1741) was a German jurist from Eisenberg, Thuringia.

== Life ==
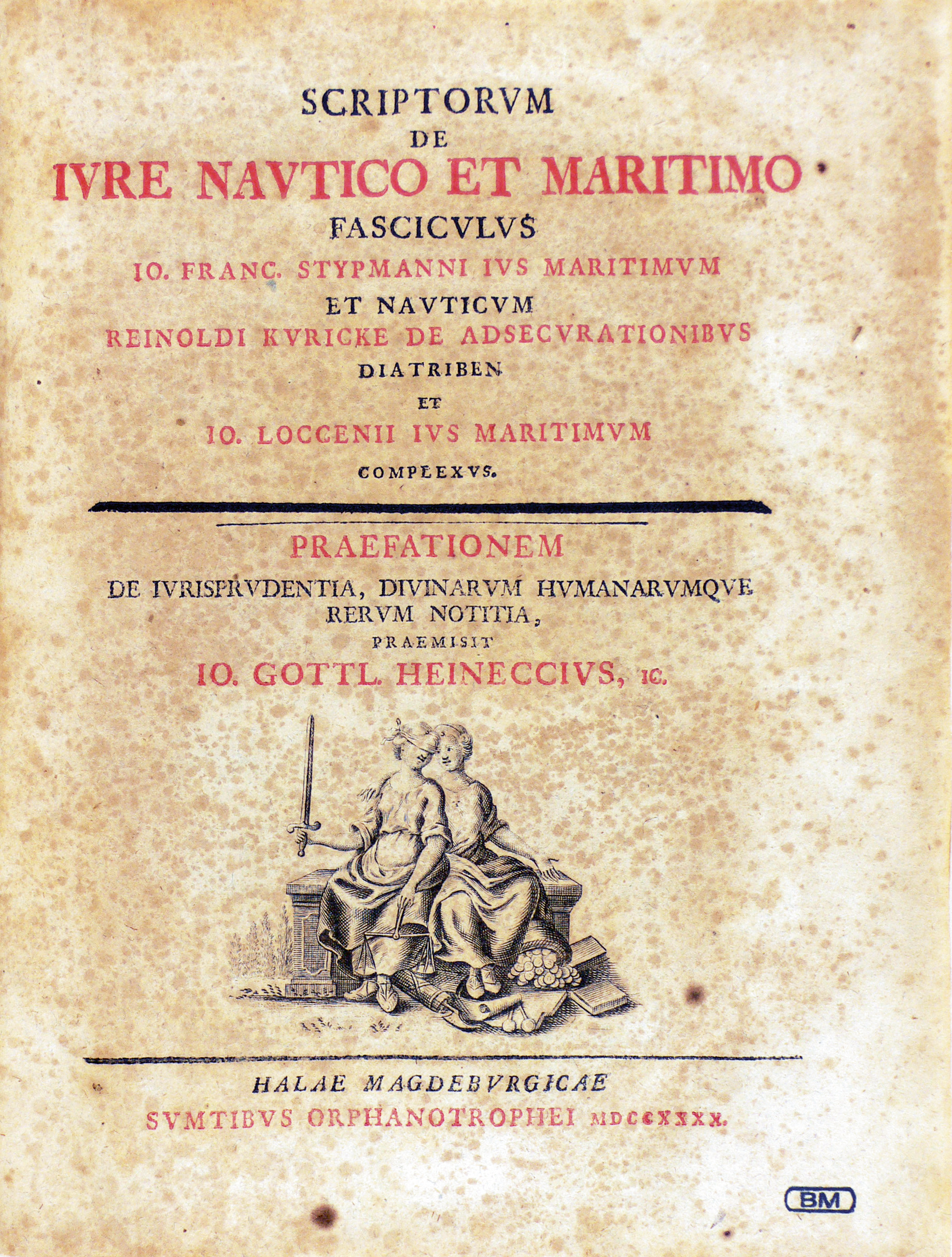
Scriptorum de iure nautico, 1740 (Milano, Fondazione Mansutti)

He studied theology at Leipzig, and law at Halle; and at the latter university he was appointed in 1713 professor of philosophy, and in 1718 professor of jurisprudence. He subsequently filled legal chairs at Franeker in the Netherlands and at Frankfurt, but finally returned to Halle in 1733 as professor of philosophy and jurisprudence.

Heineccius belonged to the school of philosophical jurists. He endeavoured to treat law as a rational science, and not merely as an empirical art whose rules had no deeper source than expediency. Thus he continually refers to first principles, and he develops his legal doctrines as a system of philosophy.

Heineccius's brother, Johann Michael Heineccius (1674–1722), was a well-known preacher and theologian.

== Works ==
His chief works were:

- Antiquitatum Romanarum jurisprudentiam illustrantium syntagma (1718)
- Historia juris civilis Romani ac Germanici (1733)
- Elementa juris Germanici (1735)
- Scriptorum de iure nautico et maritimo, 1740.
- Operum ad universam iuris prudentiam, Ginevra, 1744 (8 voll.).
- Elementa juris naturae et gentium (1737; Eng. trans. by Turnbull, 2 vols, London, 1763)

Besides these works he wrote on purely philosophical subjects, and edited the works of several of the classical jurists. His Opera omnia (9 vols, Geneva, 1771, etc.) were edited by his son Johann Christian Gottlieb Heineccius (1718–1791).

Other works:

- Elementa iuris cambialis (in Italian). Roma: Tipografia di Giovanni Ferretti. 1842.
