= Bordesholm =

- Municipality
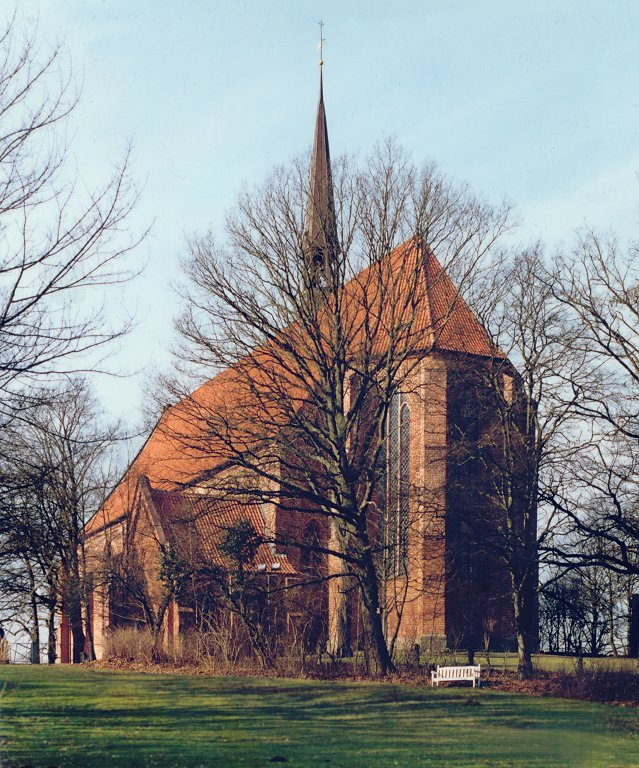
- Church

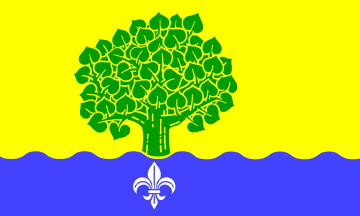
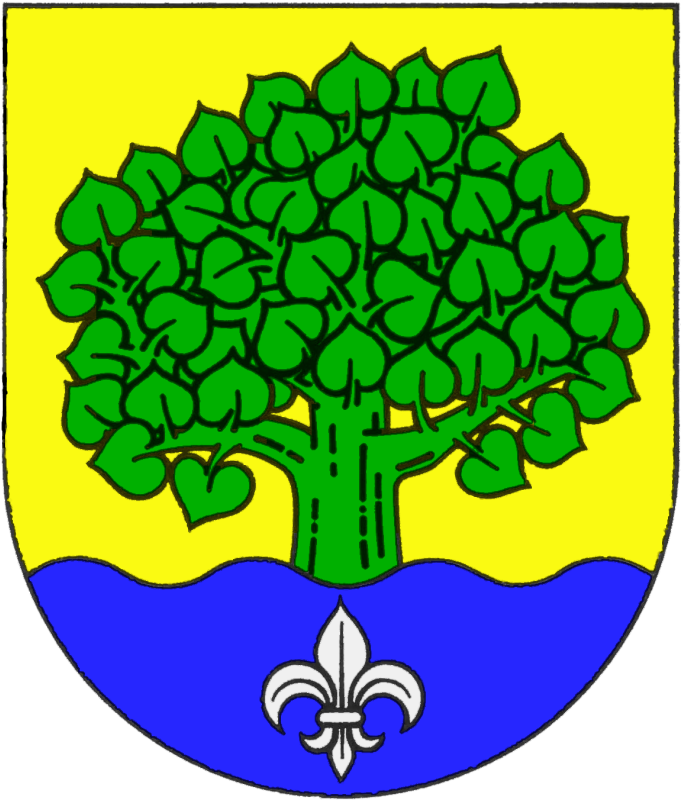
- Flag Coat of arms

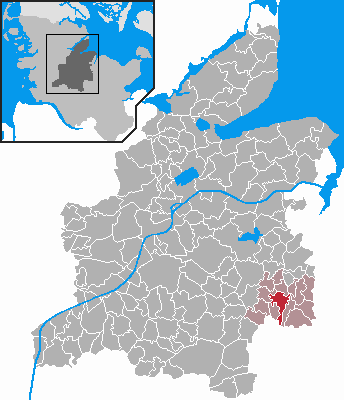
- Location of Bordesholm within Rendsburg-Eckernförde district
- Interactive map of Bordesholm
- Location within Germany Location within Schleswig-Holstein
- Coordinates: 54°11′N 10°1′E
- Country: Germany
- State: Schleswig-Holstein
- District: Rendsburg-Eckernförde
- Municipal assoc.: Bordesholm

Government
  - Mayor: Ines Stelk

Area
  - Total: 10.17 km^{2} (3.93 sq mi)
- Elevation: 32 m (105 ft)

Population (2025-12-31)
  - Total: 7,885
  - Density: 775.3/km^{2} (2,008/sq mi)
- Time zone: UTC+01:00 (CET)
  - Summer (DST): UTC+02:00 (CEST)
- Postal codes: 24582
- Dialling codes: 04322
- Vehicle registration: RD
- Website: www.bordesholm.de

Bordesholm (German pronunciation: [ˈbɔʁdəsˌhɔlm]) is a municipality in Schleswig-Holstein, Germany in the district Rendsburg-Eckernförde. Bordesholm is also the name of a former historical district of the Kingdom of Prussia and Weimar Republic for which it was the district capital. The district of Bordesholm was subsequently dissolved in 1932 and parceled out to neighboring districts (parts of the district of Bordesholm were joined with the district of Segeberg and the rest to Rendsburg-Eckernförde).

== History ==
The town of Bordesholm developed around 1330, when the abbey of Neumünster (founded in 1127 by Bishop Vizelin) was moved to an island in the Bordesholm lake. Saint Vizelin was buried there. Thereafter, a village grew up at the shore of the lake, likely providing services to the abbey. Because of the abbey, Bordesholm became the cultural and economic center of the duchy of Holstein (nowadays Schleswig-Holstein) region between Kiel and Neumünster.

The abbey's name is known in late Gothic period music due to the Bordesholm Lament of Virgin Mary (Bordesholmer Marienklage), a 1475/76 passion drama with songs in middle German.

During the Reformation, the abbey was closed in 1566 by Duke Hans the Elder of Slesvig-Holsten-Haderslev. It then became a Latin school, which was dissolved in 1665. The remains of the abbey and school library became the foundation of the library of the newly founded Kiel University. From 1773 to 1865, the area of Bordesholm was administered by the King of Denmark by the virtue of his being Duke of Holstein.

== Notable people ==
- Gunter Stein (1941–2026) – electrical engineer
