= Groß Buchwald =

- Municipality
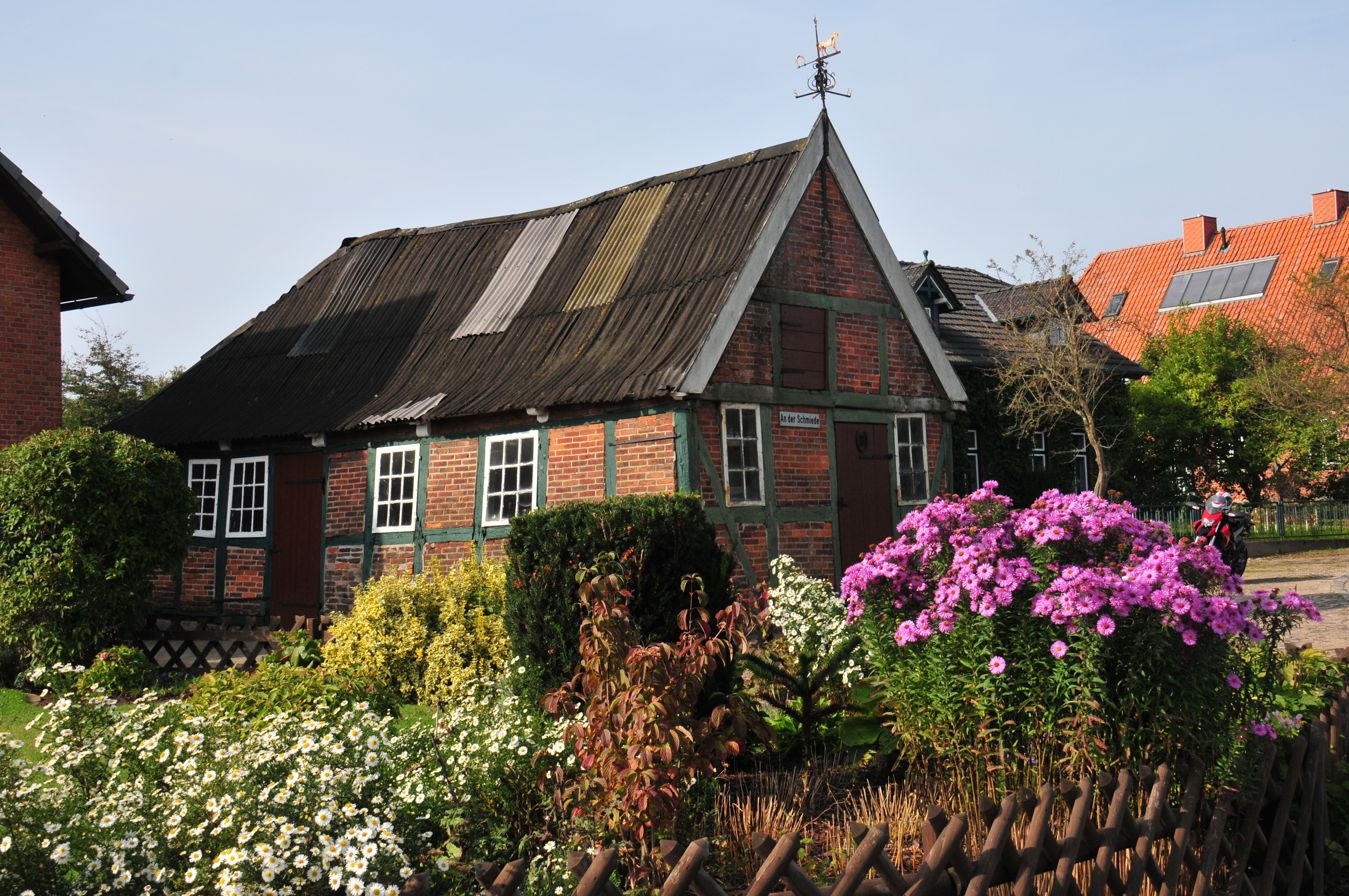
- Old smithy, a cultural heritage monument

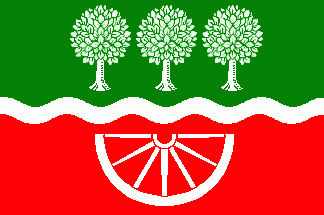
- Flag Coat of arms

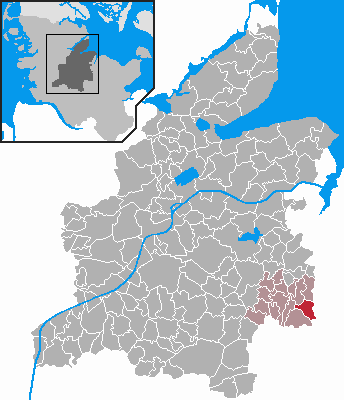
- Location of Groß Buchwald within Rendsburg-Eckernförde district
- Interactive map of Groß Buchwald
- Location within Germany Location within Schleswig-Holstein
- Coordinates: 54°10′N 10°4′E
- Country: Germany
- State: Schleswig-Holstein
- District: Rendsburg-Eckernförde
- Municipal assoc.: Bordesholm

Government
  - Mayor: Holger Gränert (CDU)

Area
  - Total: 8.95 km^{2} (3.46 sq mi)
- Elevation: 35 m (115 ft)

Population (2025-12-31)
  - Total: 411
  - Density: 45.9/km^{2} (119/sq mi)
- Time zone: UTC+01:00 (CET)
  - Summer (DST): UTC+02:00 (CEST)
- Postal codes: 24582
- Dialling codes: 04322
- Vehicle registration: RD
- Website: http://www.gross-buchwald.de/

Groß Buchwald is a municipality in the district of Rendsburg-Eckernförde, in Schleswig-Holstein, Germany.
