= Gerhard Buchwald =

Gerhard Buchwald (15 February 1920 – 19 July 2009) was a German medical doctor and vaccination critic from Eisenberg, Thuringia.

Buchwald studied medicine in Königsberg (now Kaliningrad), Danzig (Gdańsk), and Jena and obtained his doctorate at the University of Hamburg. From 1970 to 1982 he was senior physician at the Klinik Franken of the Bundesversicherungsanstalt für Angestellte in Bad Steben, and from 1982 to 1989 he was chief physician at the Klinik am Park in Bad Steben. He retired in 1990.

== Anti-vaccination advocacy ==
Buchwald actively opposed vaccinations, claiming that he followed in the footsteps of Hugo Wegener, an early opponent of smallpox vaccinations who wrote a 1912 book titled Impf-Friedhof ("Vaccine Cemetery"). He was invited to speak to homeopathic and naturopathic providers, animal rights activists, and other groups interested in health. He supported racist conspiracy theories, such as claiming that vaccines caused violence and that the brains of European children were more advanced than the brains of children living in developing countries.

== Publications ==
- Impfen - Das Geschäft mit der Angst ISBN 3-426-87031-2 (English version: Vaccination - A Business Based on Fear ISBN 3-8334-0162-1) by Dr. med. G. Buchwald
- The Vaccination Nonsense (2004 Lectures) - Dr. med. G. Buchwald ISBN 3-8334-2508-3
- The Decline of Tuberculosis despite "protective" Vaccination by Dr. Gerhard Buchwald M.D. ISBN 3-88721-175-8
- Buchwald, G (June 1967). "[Convulsive disease recognized by a court decision as a vaccination injury following smallpox vaccination]". Med Welt. 24: 1488–91. PMID 4389310.; UI: 69226516.
- Buchwald, G (March 1975). "[Letter: Smallpox vaccination: more harm than benefit]". MMW Munch Med Wochenschr. 117: 411–2. PMID 804606.; UI: 75138089.
- Buchwald, G; Steben, B (May 1972). "[Against compulsory smallpox vaccination]". Med Welt. 23: 758–60. PMID 5037193.; UI: 72214698.
