= Eisenberg, Thuringia =

Eisenberg
- Town
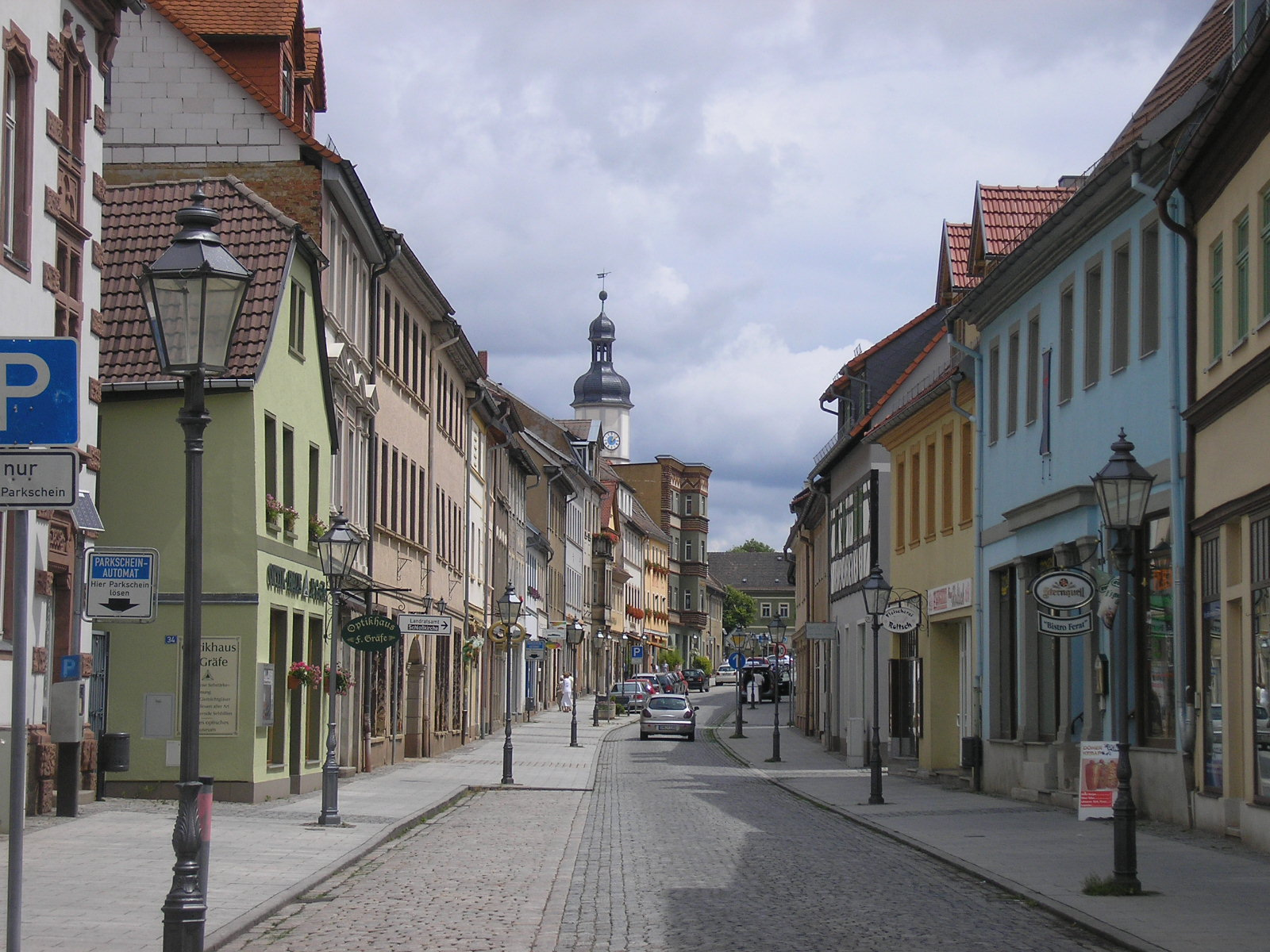

- Coat of arms

- Location of Eisenberg within Saale-Holzland-Kreis district
- Interactive map of Eisenberg
- Location within Germany Location within Thuringia
- Coordinates: 50°58′05″N 11°54′05″E
- Country: Germany
- State: Thuringia
- District: Saale-Holzland-Kreis
- Subdivisions: 4

Government
  - Mayor (2024–30): Michael Kieslich (CDU)

Area
  - Total: 24.67 km^{2} (9.53 sq mi)
- Elevation: 290 m (950 ft)

Population (2025-12-31)
  - Total: 10,955
  - Density: 444.1/km^{2} (1,150/sq mi)
- Time zone: UTC+01:00 (CET)
  - Summer (DST): UTC+02:00 (CEST)
- Postal codes: 07607
- Dialling codes: 036691
- Vehicle registration: SHK, EIS, SRO
- Website: www.stadt-eisenberg.de

Eisenberg (German pronunciation: [ˈaɪzn̩bɛʁk]) is a town in Thuringia, Germany. It is the capital of the district Saale-Holzland.

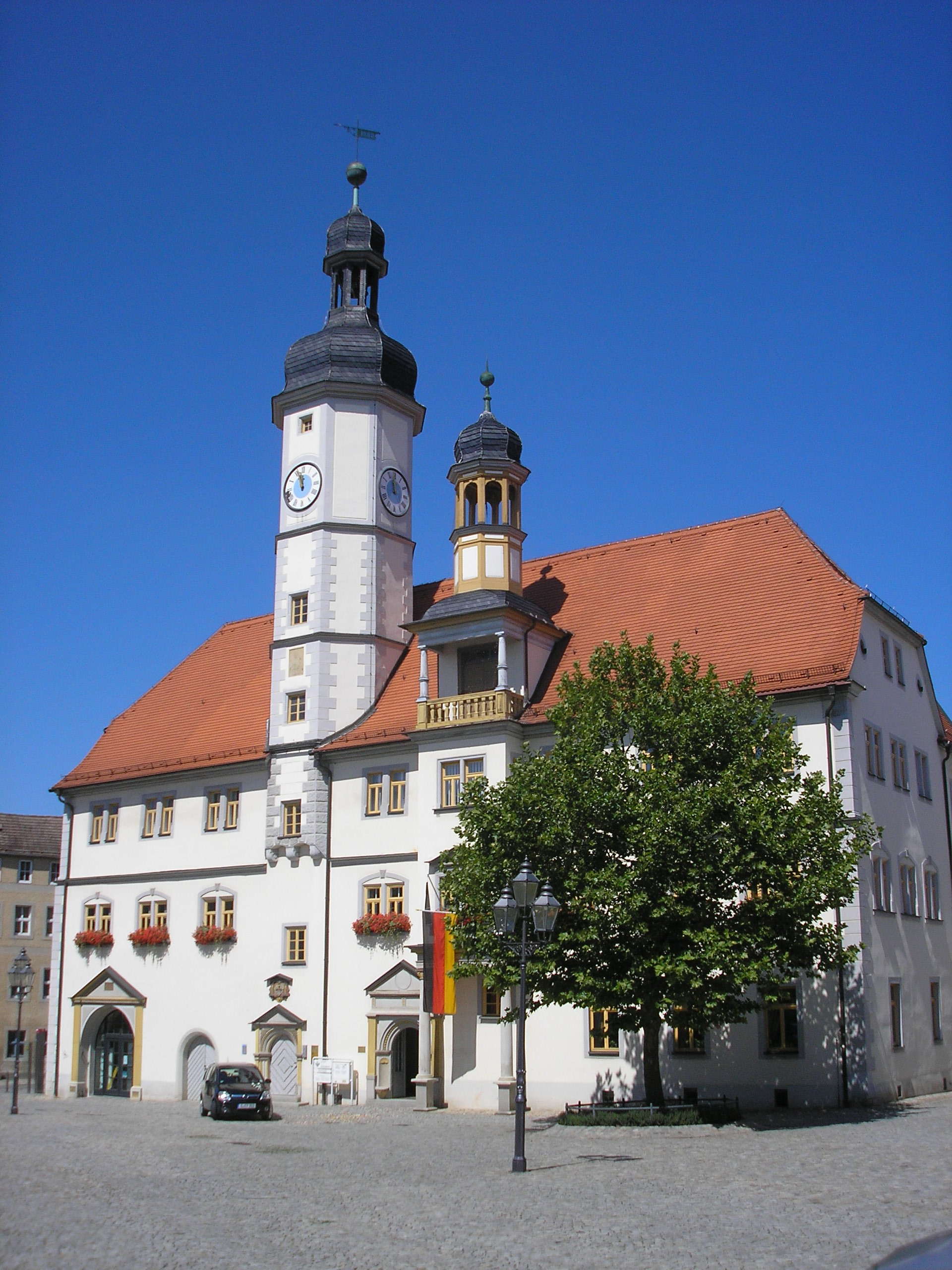
Town hall (Rathaus) Eisenberg

Neighboring municipalities are Jena (25 kilometres (16 miles) in west) and Gera (15 kilometres (9 miles) in south east). West of Eisenberg runs the motorway A 9 from Berlin to Munich. A tradition in Eisenberg on Christmas Eve is that the people of the city meet at the market place by 6 to listen to live Christmas music from the tower of the city hall - played by the brass choir of the Lutheran parish.

The main attraction of the town is the baroque Castle Church, built in 1692 by Christian, Duke of Saxe-Eisenberg.

== Personalities ==
=== Sons and daughters of the city ===
- Johann Michael Heineccius (1674–1722), Lutheran clergyman and historian
- Johann Gottlieb Heineccius (1681–1741), professor of law and philosophy
- Karl Christian Friedrich Krause (1781–1832), philosopher
- Bruno Bauer (1809–1882), philosopher
- Prince Moritz of Saxe-Altenburg (1829–1907), Prussian General of the Cavalry
- Gerhard Buchwald (1920–2009), physician
- Gunther Emmerlich (1944–2023), singer and entertainer

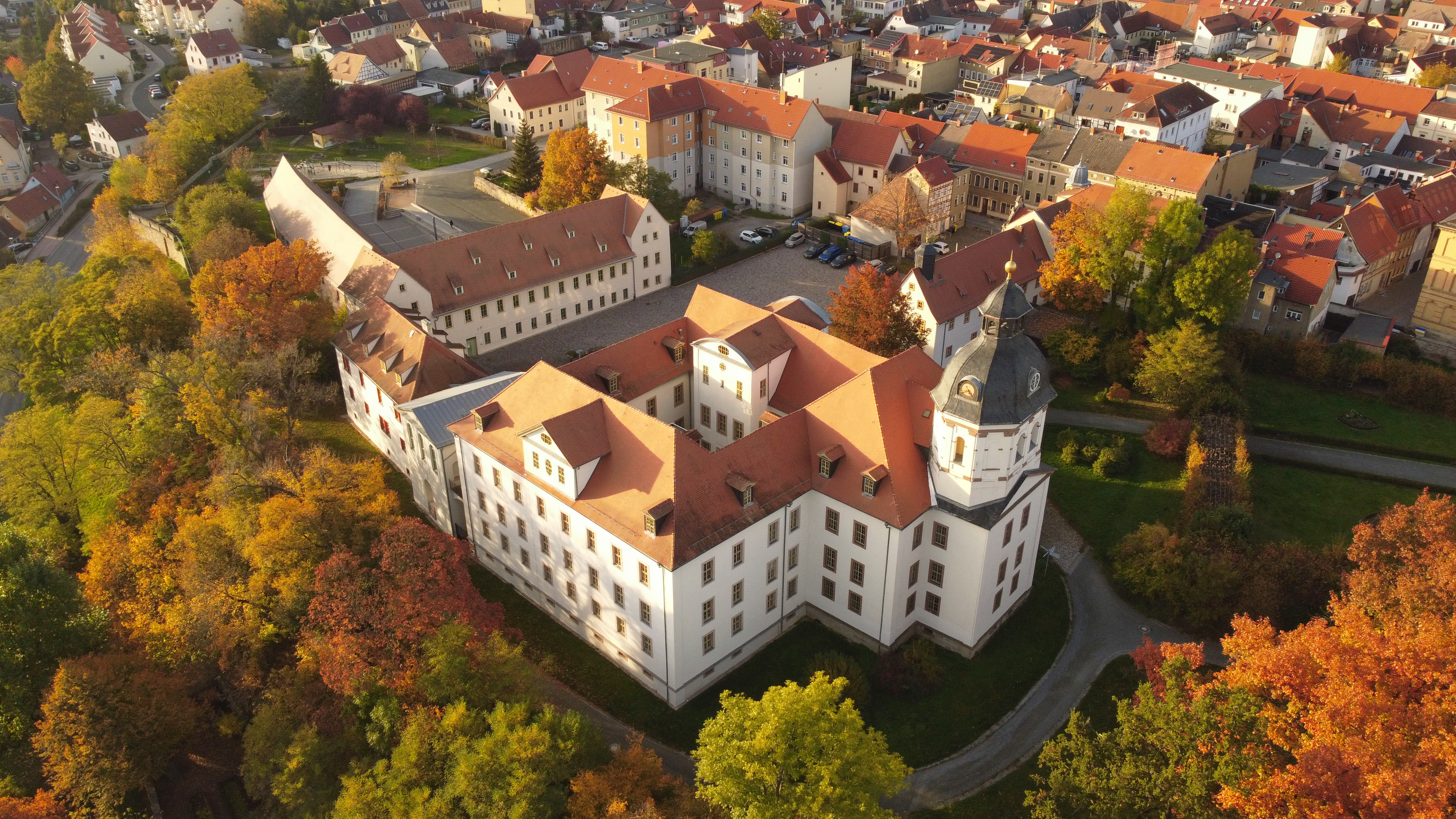
Aerial view of Christiansburg Castle where the district's administration is headquartered

=== Other personalities ===
- Christian of Saxony-Eisenberg (1653–1707), the only Duke of Saxony-Eisenberg
- Immanuel Johann Gerhard Scheller (1735–1803), an old philologist and lexicographer, studied at the Gymnasium in Eisenberg between 1747 and 1752
- Charlotte Amalie von Sachsen-Meiningen (Duchess of Saxony-Gotha-Altenburg) lived for several years in Eisenberg
- Georg von Sachsen-Altenburg (1796–1853), Duke of Saxony-Altenburg, resided alternately in Altenburg and Eisenberg
- Otto Hammann (1852–1928), jurist, studied at the Gymnasium in Eisenberg
- Ernst II, Duke of Saxe-Altenburg (1871–1955), Duke of Saxony-Altenburg, attended the Christian-School in Eisenberg between 1886 and 1889
- Peter Landau (1935-2019), legal scientist, went to school in Eisenberg
