= Bordesholmer See =

Lake in Schleswig-Holstein, Germany

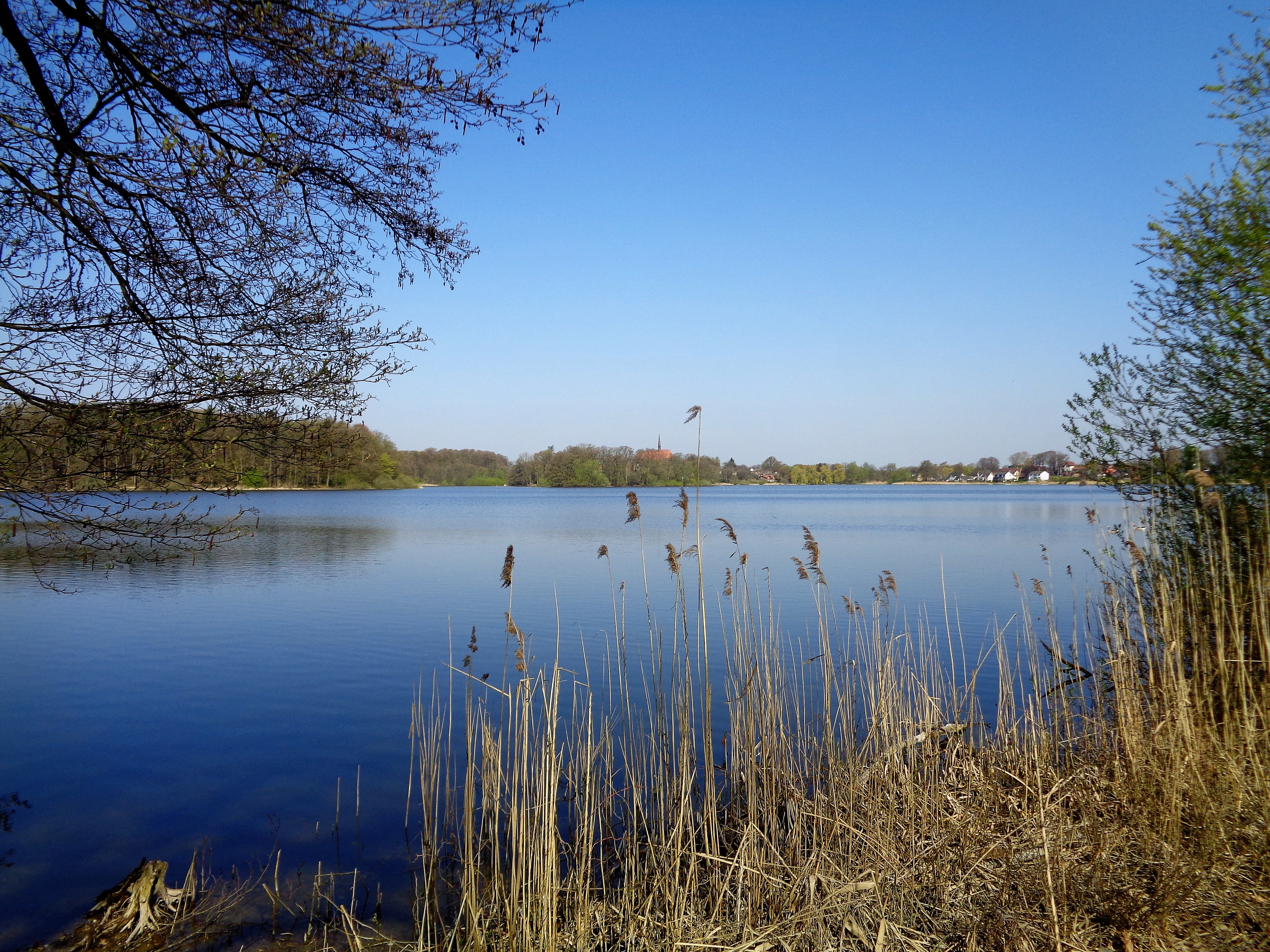

- Location within Schleswig-Holstein
- Location: Schleswig-Holstein, Germany
- Coordinates: 54°10′19″N 10°01′04″E
- Type: natural freshwater lake
- Primary outflows: Stintgraben
- Basin countries: Germany
- Max. length: 1.4 km (0.87 mi)
- Max. width: 0.9 km (0.56 mi)
- Surface area: 0.708 km^{2} (0.273 sq mi)
- Average depth: 3.3 m (11 ft)
- Max. depth: 8 m (26 ft)
- Water volume: 2,230,000 m^{3} (79,000,000 cu ft)
- Shore length^{1}: 4.9 km (3.0 mi)
- Surface elevation: 25 m (82 ft)
- Islands: 1
- ^{1} Shore length is not a well-defined measure.

Bordesholmer See is a lake in Schleswig-Holstein, Germany. Its elevation is 25 m (82 ft) and its surface area is 0.708 km^{2} (0.273 sq mi).
