= Osterau =

Osterau may refer to

- Osterau (Bramau), a tributary of the Bramau in Schleswig-Holstein, Germany
- Osterau (Broklandsau), a tributary of the Broklandsau in Schleswig-Holstein, Germany

== See also ==
- Østerå (disambiguation)
