= Aalbek =

Aalbek may refer to:

- Aalbek (Hemmelsdorfer See), a river in Schleswig-Holstein, Germany, flowing through the lake Hemmelsdorfer See, flowing into the Baltic Sea
- Aalbek (Stör), a river in Schleswig-Holstein, Germany, tributary of the Stör
