= Wierbek =

Location
- Country: Germany
- State: Schleswig-Holstein

Physical characteristics
- Mouth
  - location: Broklandsau
  - coordinates: 54.2182°N 9.1684°E

Basin features
- Progression: Broklandsau→ Eider→ North Sea

Wierbek is a small river of Schleswig-Holstein, Germany. It flows into the Broklandsau near Süderheistedt.

== See also ==
- List of rivers of Schleswig-Holstein
