= Godel (disambiguation) =

Kurt Gödel (28 April 1906 – 14 January 1978) was an Austrian (later American) logician, mathematician and philosopher.

Godel or similar may also refer to:

- Gödel (programming language)
- 3366 Gödel, a main belt asteroid discovered in 1985
- Gödel, Kastamonu, a village in the Kastamonu Province, Turkey
- Godel (river), at Föhr, Schleswig-Holstein, Germany
- Godel Iceport, at the coast of Queen Maud Land, Antarctica

Other people with the surname Godel include:

- Gaston Godel (1914−2004), Swiss race walker
- Vahé Godel (born 1931), Swiss writer
- Arkadiusz Godel (born 1952), Polish fencer
- Jon Godel, 21st-century British journalist

== See also ==
- Godel mouthpiece, a scuba mouthpiece with a snorkel attached
