= Haaler Au =

River in Schleswig-Holstein, Germany

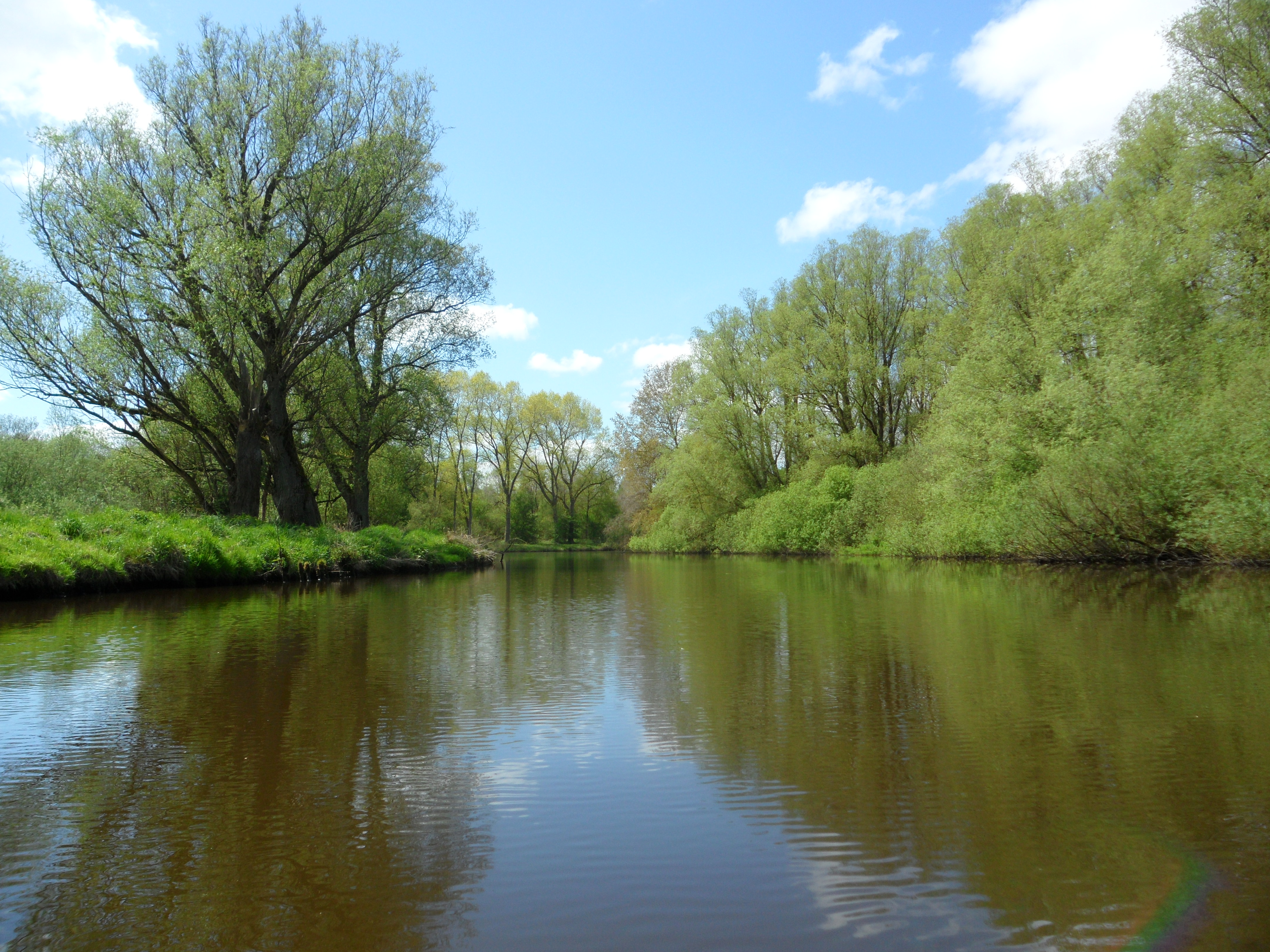
- Lower section of Haaler Au

Location
- Country: Germany
- States: Schleswig-Holstein

Physical characteristics
- Source
  - location: Confluence of Reher Au and Mühlenbek between Beringstedt and Osterstedt
- Mouth
  - location: Kiel Canal
  - coordinates: 54.1857°N 9.5032°E

Basin features
- Progression: Kiel Canal→ Elbe→ North Sea

Haaler Au (German pronunciation: [ˈhaːlɐ ˈaʊ̯]) is a river in Schleswig-Holstein, Germany. Before the building of the Kiel Canal the Haaler Au was a tributary of the Eider. The Kiel Canal cut the old river bed, now the Haaler Au ends at the Kiel Canal. Shortly before the Canal the river forms a lake.

The usage of canoes and rowboats is possible on the lower part of the river.

== See also ==
- List of rivers of Schleswig-Holstein
