= Wilsterau =

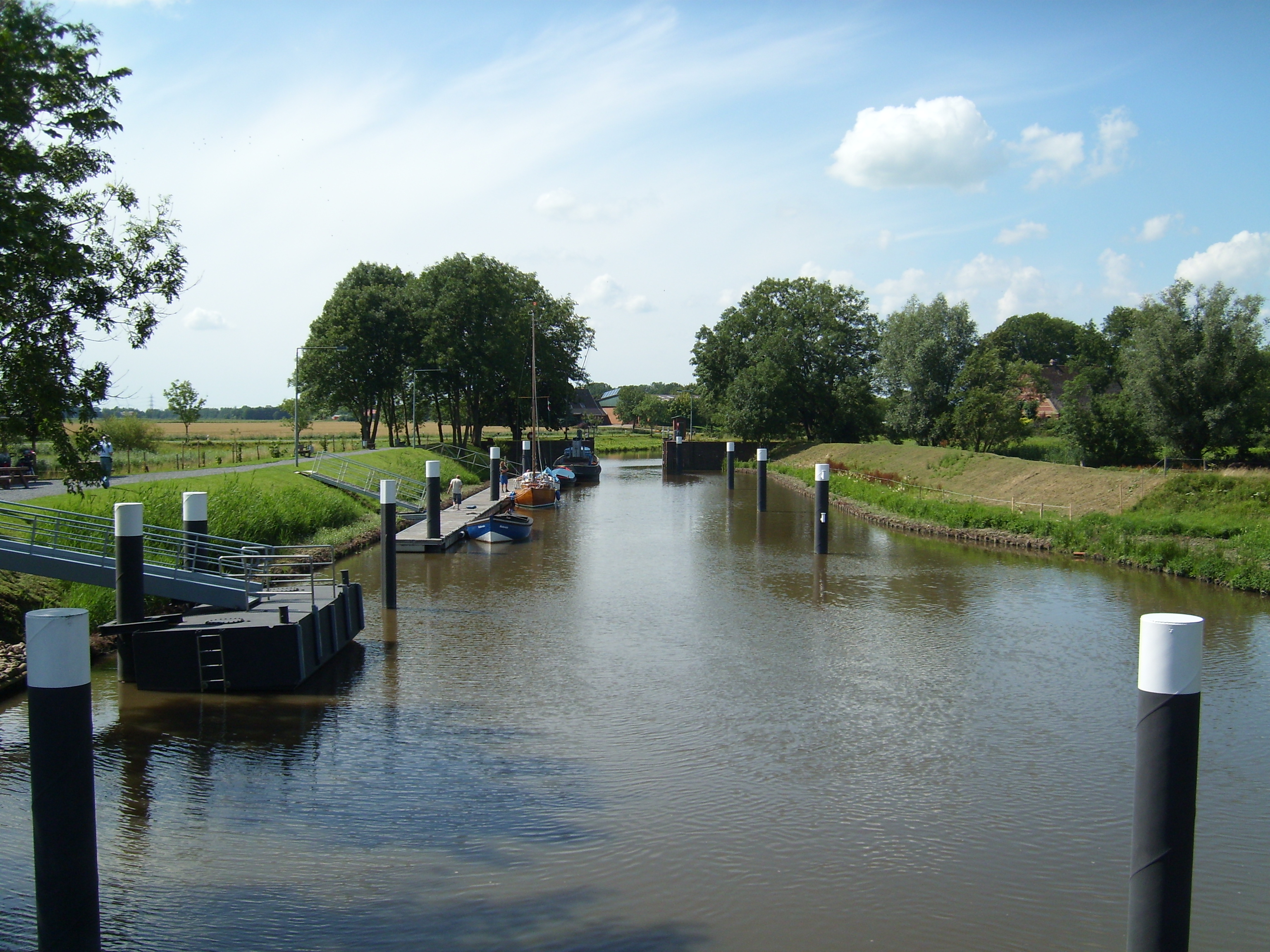

Location
- Country: Germany
- State: Schleswig-Holstein

Physical characteristics
- Mouth
  - location: Stör
  - coordinates: 53.9115°N 9.4096°E
- Length: 19 km (12 mi)

Basin features
- Progression: Stör→ Elbe→ North Sea

The Wilsterau is a river of Schleswig-Holstein, Germany. It is a right tributary of the Stör near Wilster.

== See also ==
- List of rivers of Schleswig-Holstein
