= Rantzau (river) =

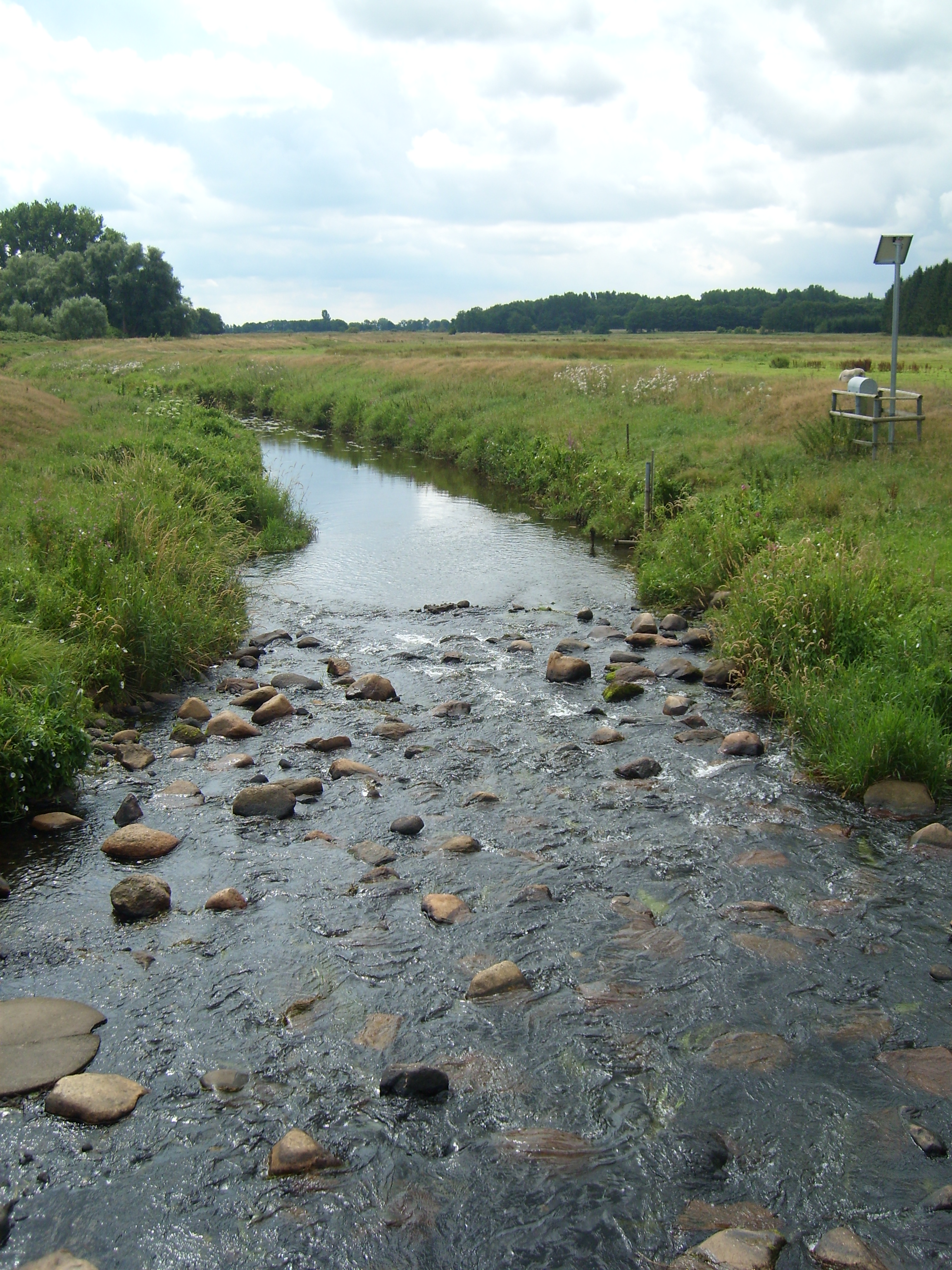

Location
- Country: Germany
- States: Schleswig-Holstein

Physical characteristics
- Mouth
  - location: Stör
  - coordinates: 53°55′34″N 9°37′17″E

Basin features
- Progression: Stör→ Elbe→ North Sea

Rantzau is a river in Schleswig-Holstein, Germany. It flows into the Stör near Breitenberg.

== See also ==
- List of rivers of Schleswig-Holstein
