= Krumbek =

Location
- Country: Germany
- States: Schleswig-Holstein

Physical characteristics
- Mouth
  - location: Gronau
  - coordinates: 53.7490°N 9.9091°E

Basin features
- Progression: Gronau→ Pinnau→ Elbe→ North Sea

Krumbek is a small river of Schleswig-Holstein, Germany. It flows into the Gronau near Ellerau.

== See also ==
- List of rivers of Schleswig-Holstein
