= Wehrau =

Wehrau may refer to:

- Osiecznica, Lower Silesian Voivodeship, a village in south-western Poland
- Wehrau (river), of Schleswig-Holstein, Germany
