= Mühlenbarbeker Au =

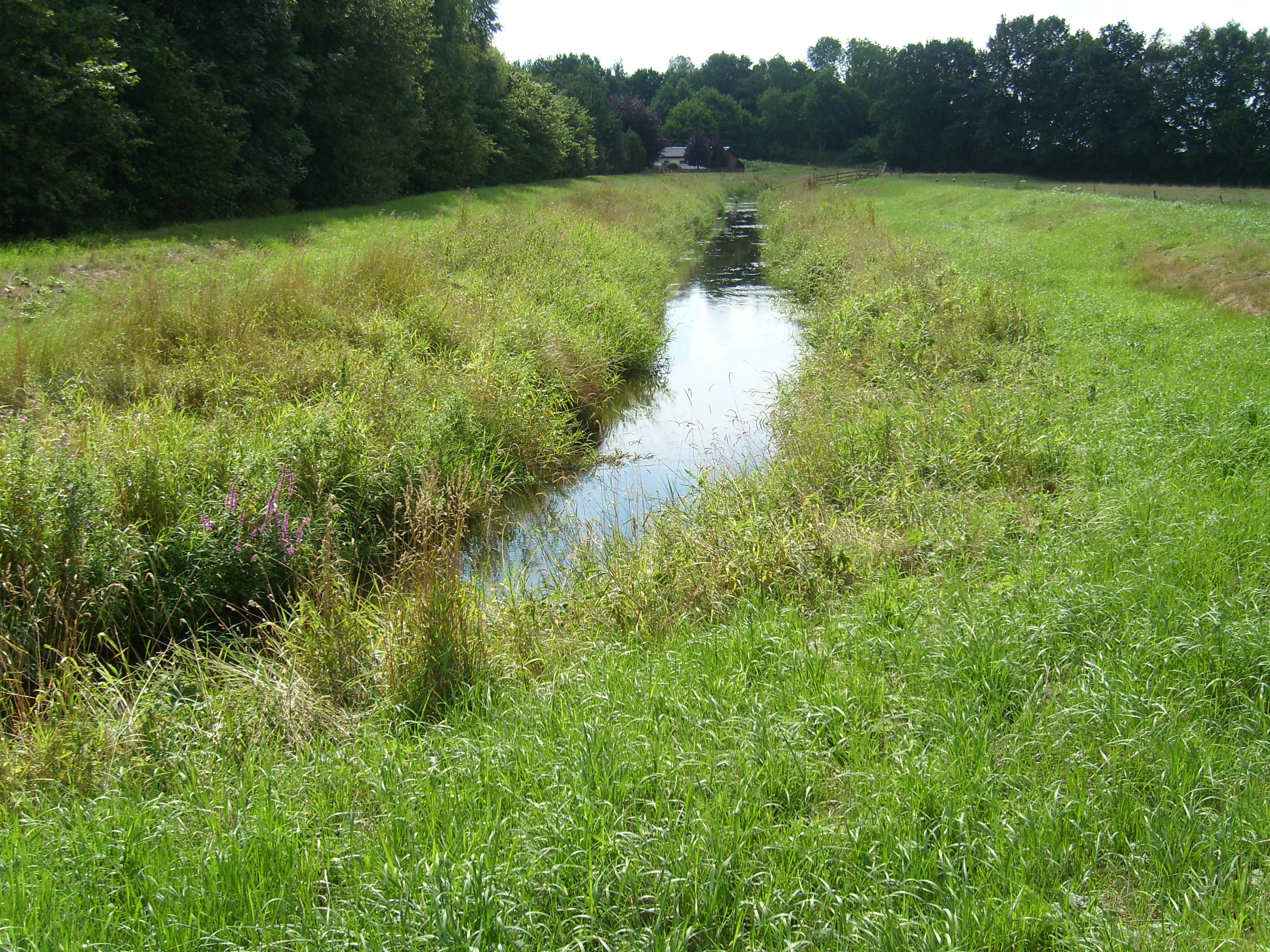

Location
- Country: Germany
- State: Schleswig-Holstein

Physical characteristics
- Mouth
  - location: Stör
  - coordinates: 53.9428°N 9.6686°E

Basin features
- Progression: Stör→ Elbe→ North Sea

Mühlenbarbeker Au (German pronunciation: [ˈmyːlənbaʁˌbeːkɐ ˈʔaʊ]) is a river of Schleswig-Holstein, Germany. It flows into the Stör near Mühlenbarbek.

== See also ==
- List of rivers of Schleswig-Holstein
