= Curauer Au =

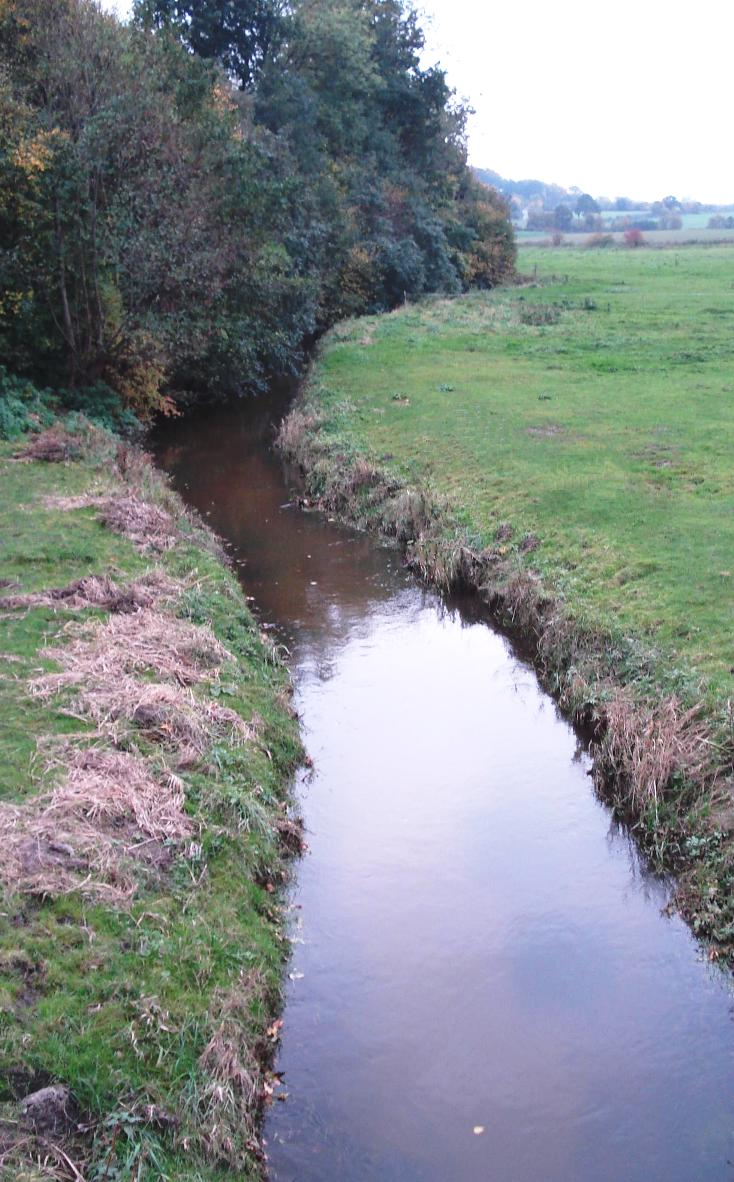

Location
- Country: Germany
- State: Schleswig-Holstein

Physical characteristics
- Mouth
  - location: Schwartau
  - coordinates: 53°58′09″N 10°41′40″E

Basin features
- Progression: Schwartau→ Trave→ Baltic Sea

Curauer Au (German pronunciation: [ˈkuʁaʊ̯ɐ ˈaʊ̯], also called Curau) is a river of Schleswig-Holstein, Germany. It flows into the Schwartau in Rohlsdorf (a district of Ratekau).

== See also ==
- List of rivers of Schleswig-Holstein
