= Osteras =

Osteras may refer to:

- Østerås, a village in Akershus, Norway
- Østerås (station), the terminal station on the Røa Line of the Oslo Metro, Norway
- Audun Østerås (born 1947), Norwegian politician
- Österås, Swedish name of Itäharju, a district in the Itäharju-Varissuo ward of Turku, Finland

== See also ==
- Østerå (disambiguation)
