= Jevenau =

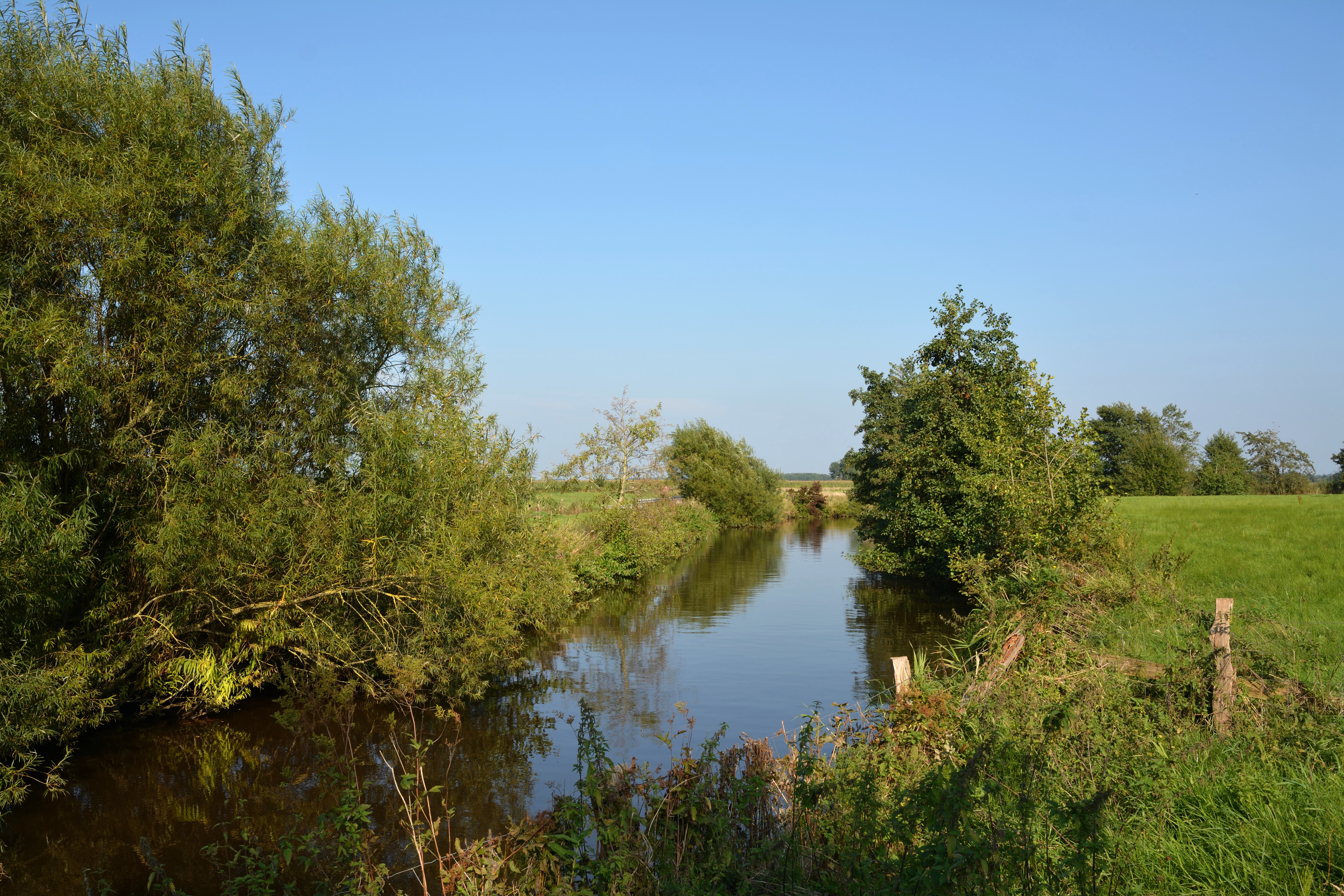

Location
- Country: Germany
- States: Schleswig-Holstein

Physical characteristics
- Mouth
  - location: Kiel Canal
  - coordinates: 54.2286°N 9.6050°E

Basin features
- Progression: Kiel Canal→ Elbe→ North Sea

Jevenau is a river in Schleswig-Holstein, Germany. It flows into the Kiel Canal near Hörsten.

== See also ==
- List of rivers of Schleswig-Holstein
