= Fackenburger Landgraben =

River in Schleswig-Holstein, Germany

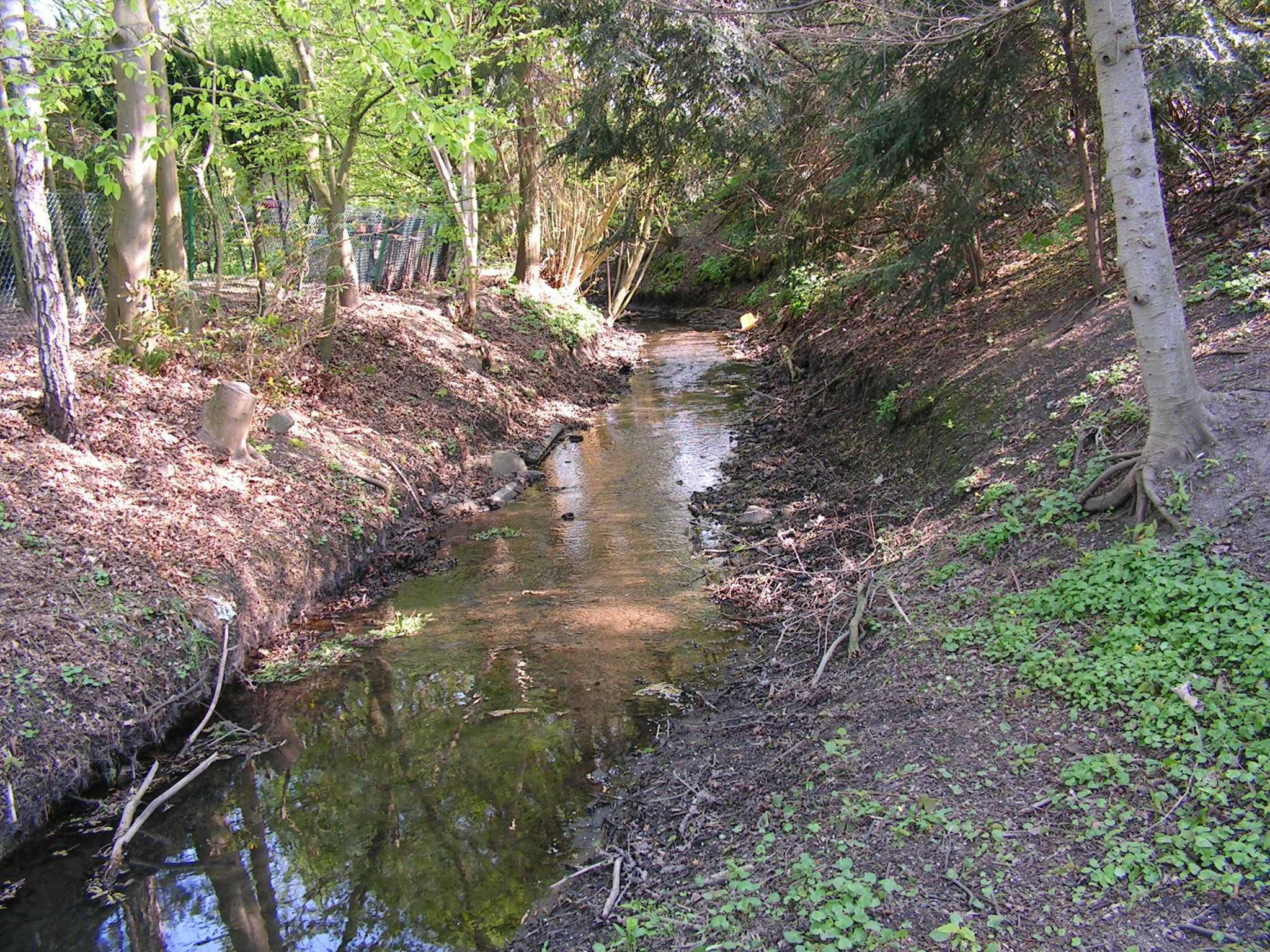
- The Fackenburger Landgraben at the height of the street Jebsenring of Stockelsdorf
- Interactive map of Fackenburger Landgraben

Geography
- Start point: Steinrader Damm (53.8741°N 10.6152°E)
- End point: Clever Au (53.9041°N 10.6828°E)

Fackenburger Landgraben is a small canal in Schleswig-Holstein, Germany. It was part of the Landwehr (border fortification) of the city of Lübeck.

== See also ==
- List of rivers of Schleswig-Holstein
