= Flörkendorfer Mühlenau =

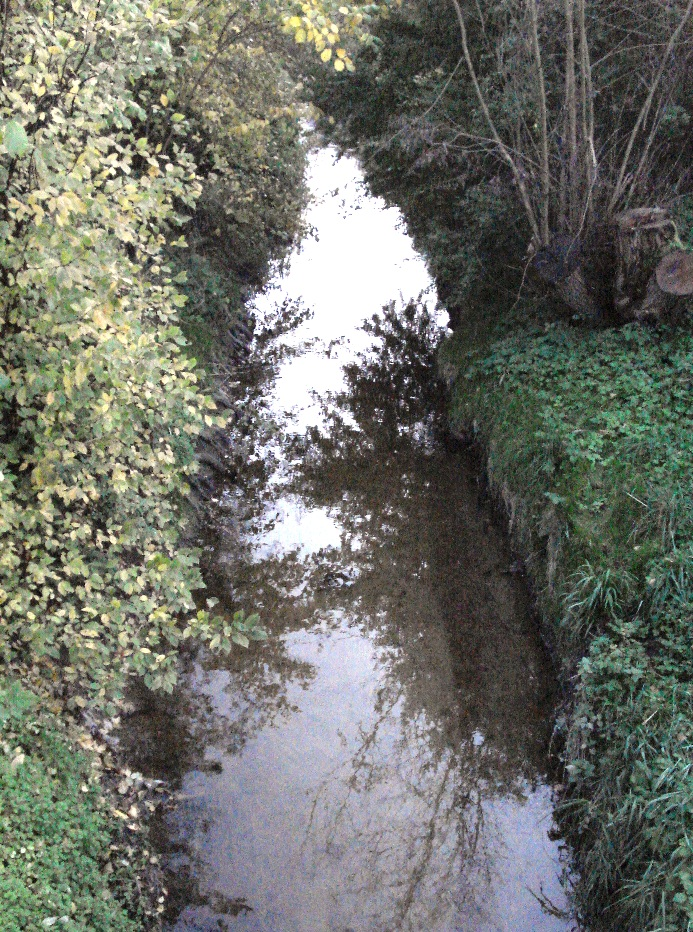

Location
- Country: Germany
- State: Schleswig-Holstein

Physical characteristics
- Mouth
  - location: Schwartau
  - coordinates: 54°01′24″N 10°39′51″E

Basin features
- Progression: Schwartau→ Trave→ Baltic Sea

Flörkendorfer Mühlenau is a river of Schleswig-Holstein, Germany. It flows into the Schwartau near Gleschendorf.

== See also ==
- List of rivers of Schleswig-Holstein
