= Lindenerau =

Location
- Country: Germany
- States: Schleswig-Holstein

Physical characteristics
- Mouth
  - location: Broklandsau
  - coordinates: 54.2350°N 9.1927°E

Basin features
- Progression: Broklandsau→ Eider→ North Sea

Lindenerau is a small river of Schleswig-Holstein, Germany. It flows into the Broklandsau near Barkenholm.

== See also ==
- List of rivers of Schleswig-Holstein
