= Heilsau =

Location
- Country: Germany
- States: Schleswig-Holstein

Physical characteristics
- Mouth
  - location: Trave
  - coordinates: 53.8197°N 10.4725°E

Basin features
- Progression: Trave→ Baltic Sea

Heilsau is a river of Schleswig-Holstein, Germany. It flows into the Trave near Reinfeld.

== See also ==
- List of rivers of Schleswig-Holstein
