= Medebek =

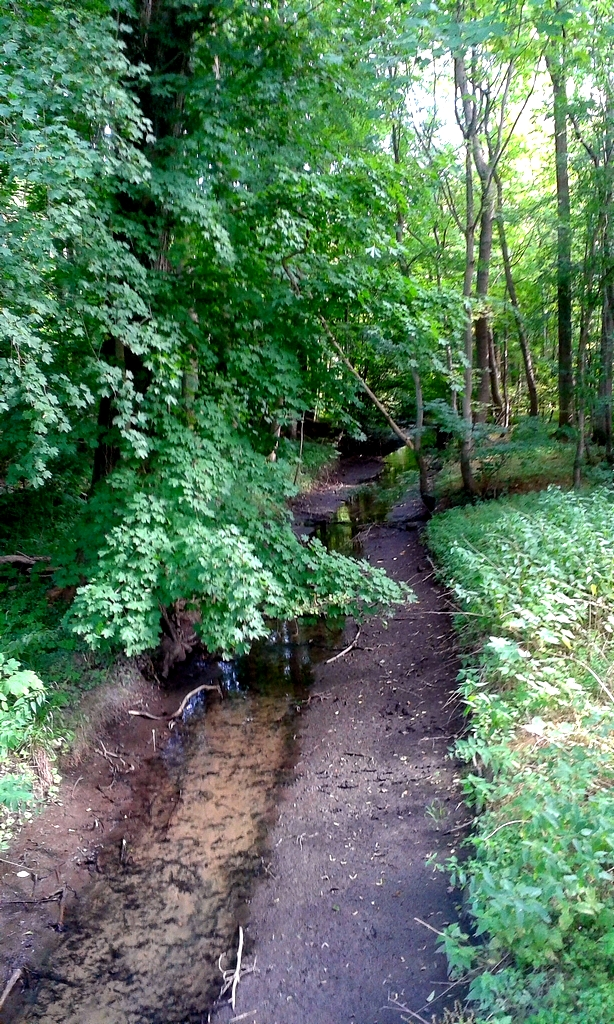

Location
- Country: Germany
- States: Schleswig-Holstein

Physical characteristics
- Mouth
  - location: Trave
  - coordinates: 53.9053°N 10.7157°E

Basin features
- Progression: Trave→ Baltic Sea

Medebek is a river of Schleswig-Holstein, Germany. It flows into the Trave northeast of Lübeck.

== See also ==
- List of rivers of Schleswig-Holstein
