= Bölkau =

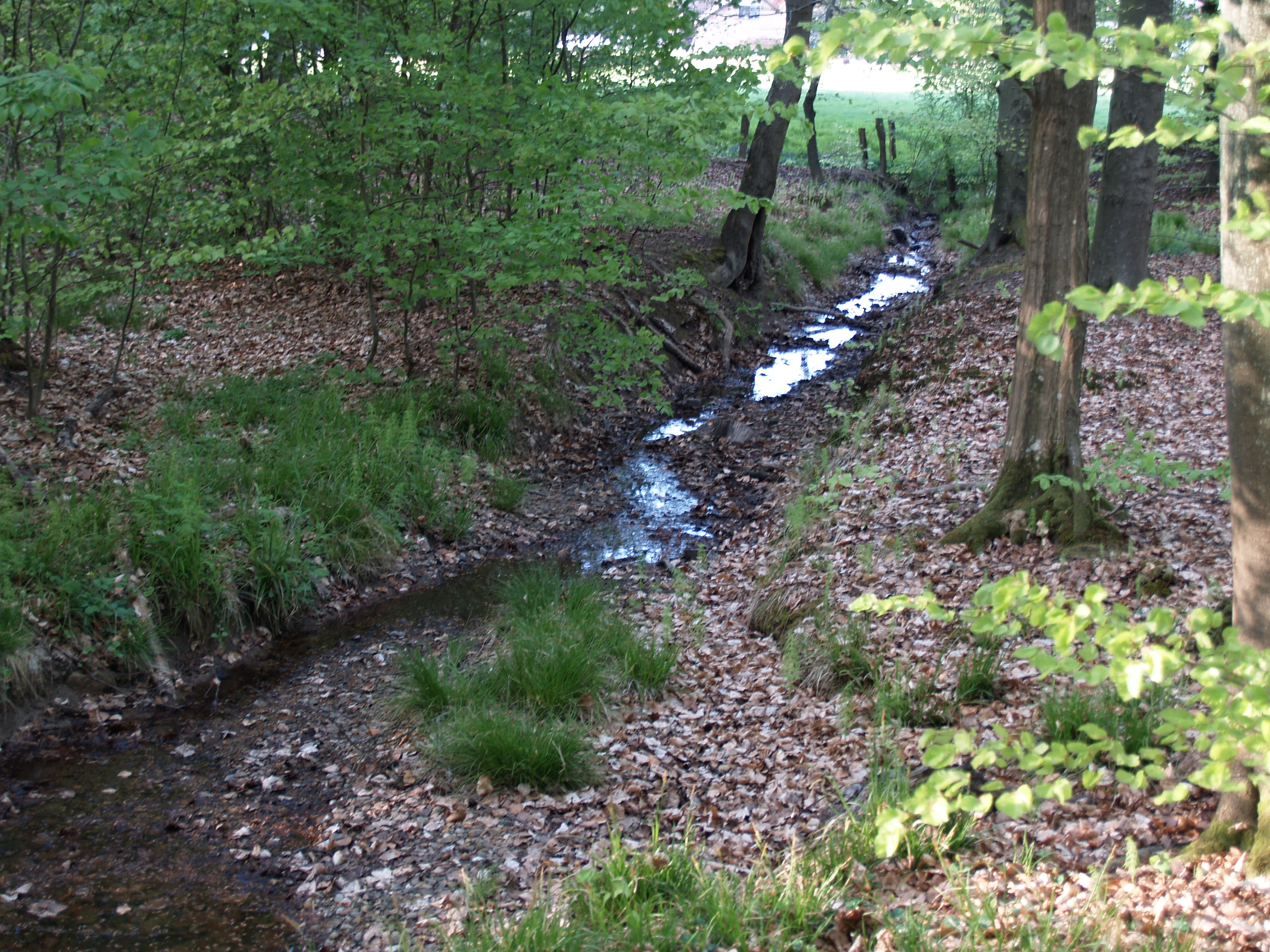

Location
- Country: Germany
- State: Schleswig-Holstein

Physical characteristics
- Mouth
  - location: Schwarze Bek
  - coordinates: 53°30′24″N 10°27′34″E

Basin features
- Progression: Schwarze Bek→ Schwarze Au→ Bille→ Elbe→ North Sea

Bölkau is a small river of Schleswig-Holstein, Germany. It flows into the Schwarze Bek near Schwarzenbek.

== See also ==
- List of rivers of Schleswig-Holstein
