= Hemmelsdorfer See =

Lake in Germany

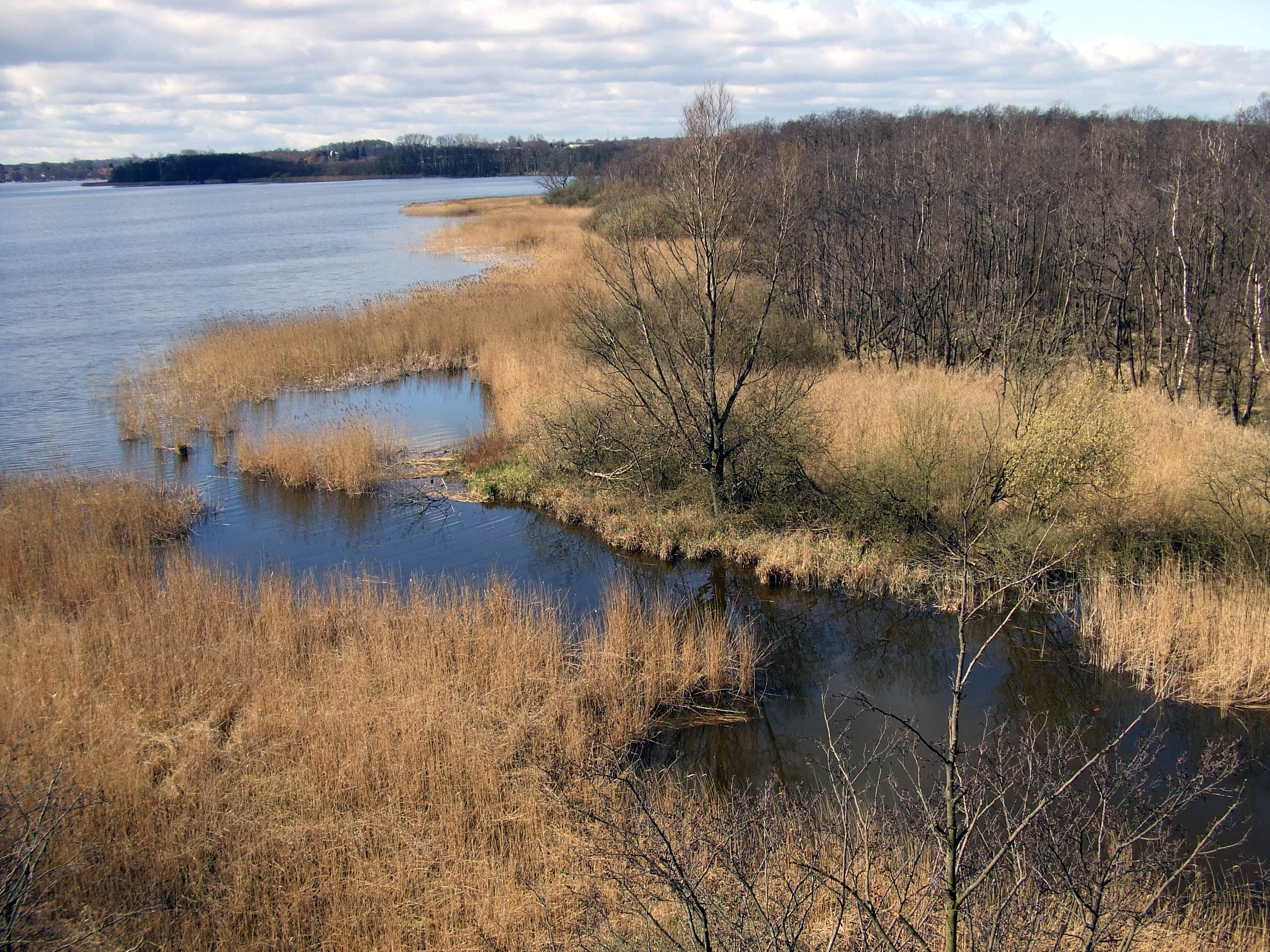

- Location within Schleswig-Holstein
- Location: Eastern Schleswig-Holstein
- Coordinates: 53°57′59.16″N 10°46′57.75″E
- Primary inflows: Mühlenau, Aalbek, Thuraubek
- Primary outflows: Aalbek
- Basin countries: Germany
- Surface area: 4.48 km^{2} (1.73 sq mi)
- Max. depth: 39.5 m (130 ft)
- Surface elevation: −0.10 m (−0.33 ft)

Hemmelsdorfer See is a lake in Eastern Schleswig-Holstein, Germany. At an elevation of -0.10 m, its surface area is 4.48 km².
