= Aalbek (Stör) =

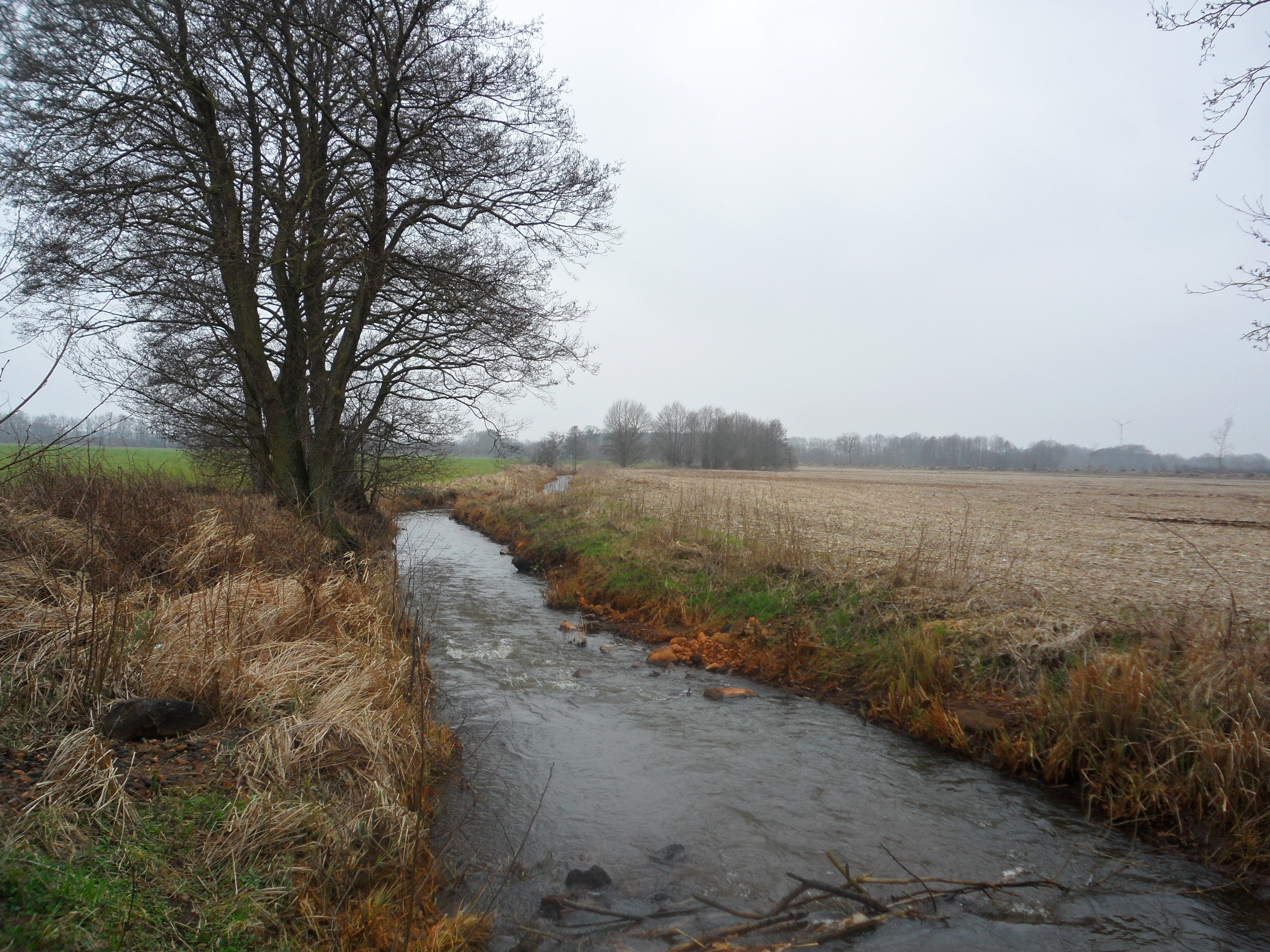

Location
- Country: Germany
- State: Schleswig-Holstein

Physical characteristics
- Mouth
  - location: Stör
  - coordinates: 54°02′57″N 9°53′51″E

Basin features
- Progression: Stör→ Elbe→ North Sea

Aalbek is a river of Schleswig-Holstein, Germany. It flows into the Stör in Ehndorf.

== See also ==
- List of rivers of Schleswig-Holstein
