= Füsinger Au =

Füsinger Au Fysing Å
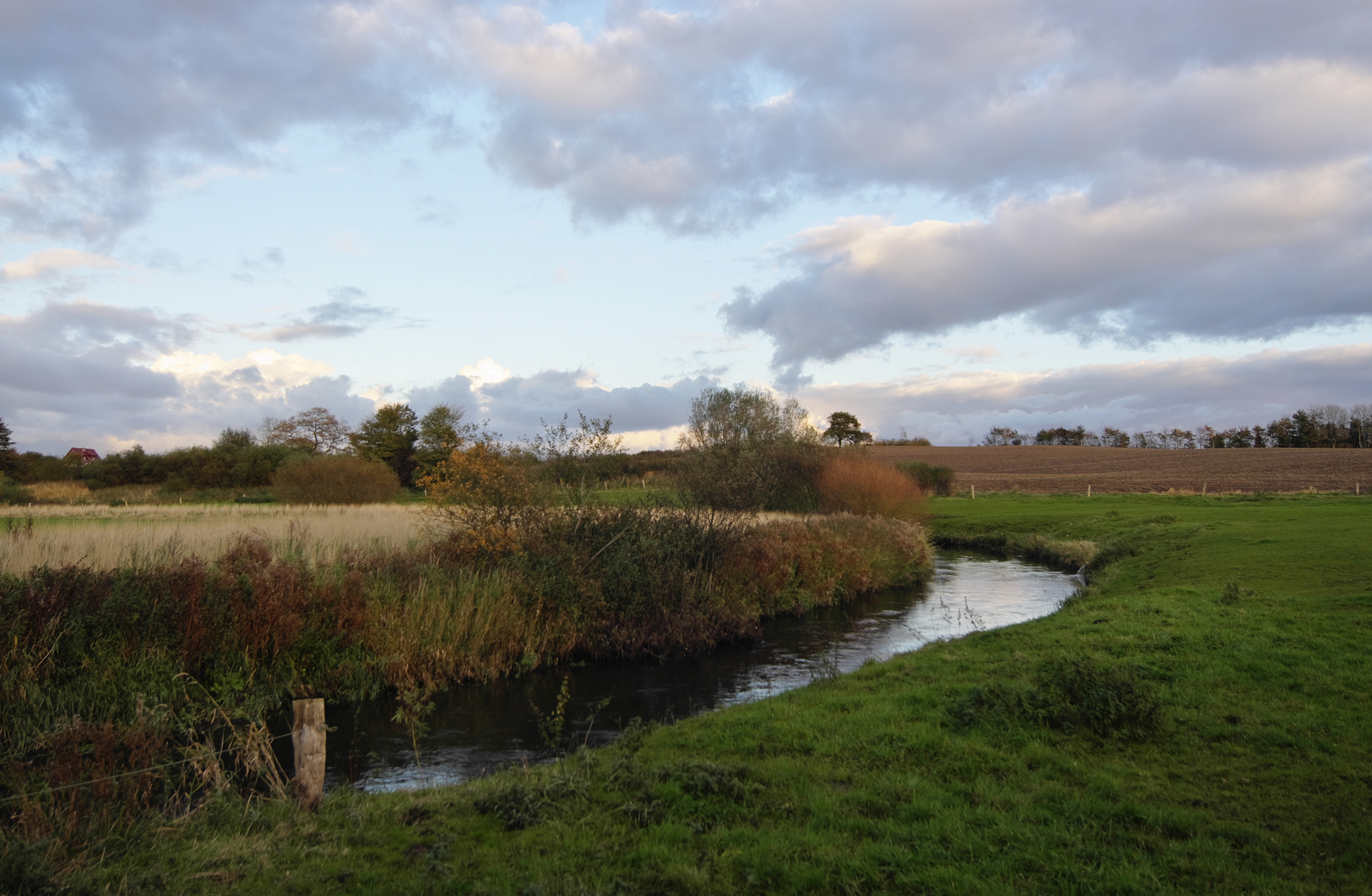
- The Füsinger Au near Westerakeby

Location
- Country: Germany
- State: Schleswig-Holstein

Physical characteristics
- Source
  - location: Angeln
  - coordinates: 54°35′33″N 9°31′52″E
- Mouth
  - location: Schlei
  - coordinates: 54°31′50″N 9°37′34″E
- Length: 35 km (22 mi)

The Füsinger Au (German pronunciation: [ˈfyzɪŋɐ ˈaʊ̯]; also Loiter Au, German pronunciation: [ˈlɔɪ̯tɐ ˈaʊ̯]; Danish: Fysing Å / Løjt Å) is a river in the north of Schleswig-Holstein (Danish: Slesvig and Holsten respectively), Germany.

The Füsinger Au starts north of Idstedt (Danish: Isted), flows through the lakes Idstedter See and Langsee (Danish: Isted Sø and Langesø respectively), passes the village Loit (Danish: Løjt) and discharges into the Schlei (Danish: Slien) near Füsing (a district of Schaalby) (Danish: Fysing and Skålby).

== See also ==
- List of rivers of Schleswig-Holstein

== Sources ==
- flussinfo.net (in German)
