= Spöck (Eider) =

Location
- Country: Germany
- State: Schleswig-Holstein

Physical characteristics
- Mouth
  - location: Upper Eider
  - coordinates: 54.1802°N 10.0653°E

Basin features
- Progression: Upper Eider→ Kiel Canal→ Elbe→ North Sea

Spöck is a small river of Schleswig-Holstein, Germany. It flows into the Upper Eider near Brügge.

== See also ==
- List of rivers of Schleswig-Holstein
