= Lankau (Alster) =

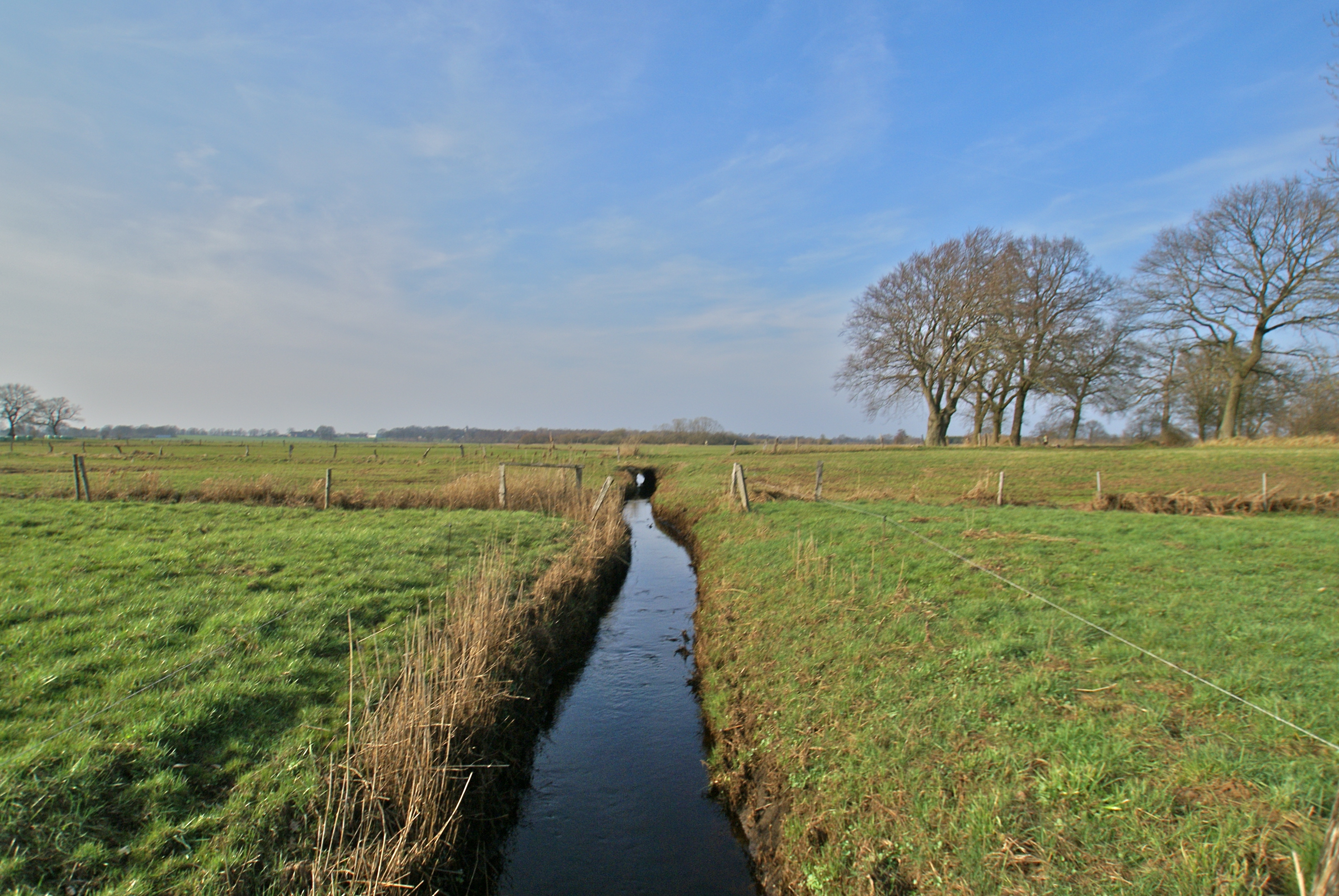

Location
- Country: Germany
- States: Schleswig-Holstein

Physical characteristics
- Mouth
  - location: Alster
  - coordinates: 53.7762°N 10.1490°E

Basin features
- Progression: Alster→ Elbe→ North Sea

Lankau (German pronunciation: [ˈlaŋkaʊ]) is a small river of Schleswig-Holstein, Germany. It flows into the Alster near Nahe.

== See also ==
- List of rivers of Schleswig-Holstein
