= Mühlenbek =

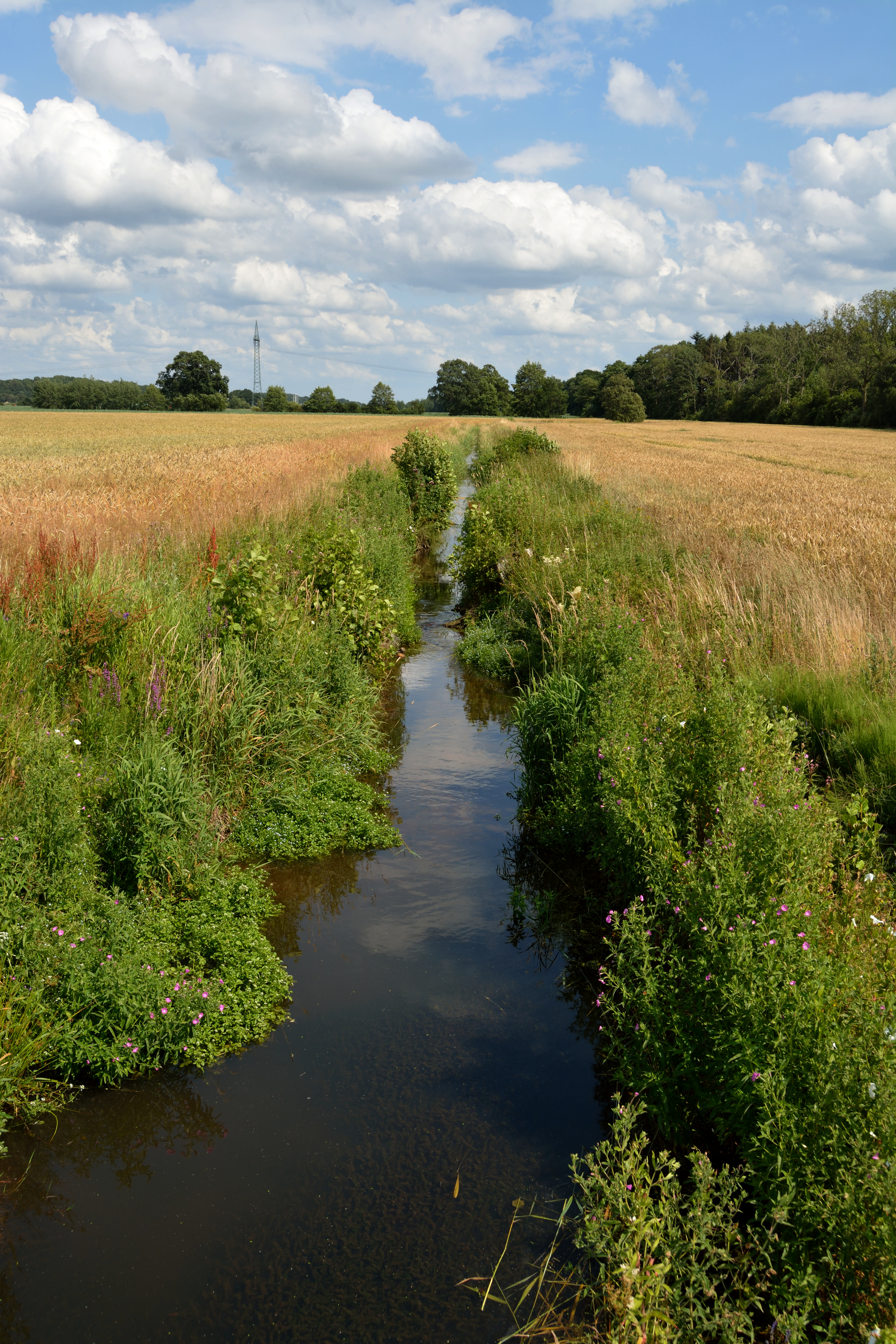

Location
- Country: Germany
- States: Schleswig-Holstein

Physical characteristics
- Mouth
  - location: Stör
  - coordinates: 53°56′48″N 9°43′21″E

Basin features
- Progression: Stör→ Elbe→ North Sea

Mühlenbek is a river of Schleswig-Holstein, Germany. It flows into the Stör near Kellinghusen.

== See also ==
- List of rivers of Schleswig-Holstein
