= Heidgraben (Uetersen) =

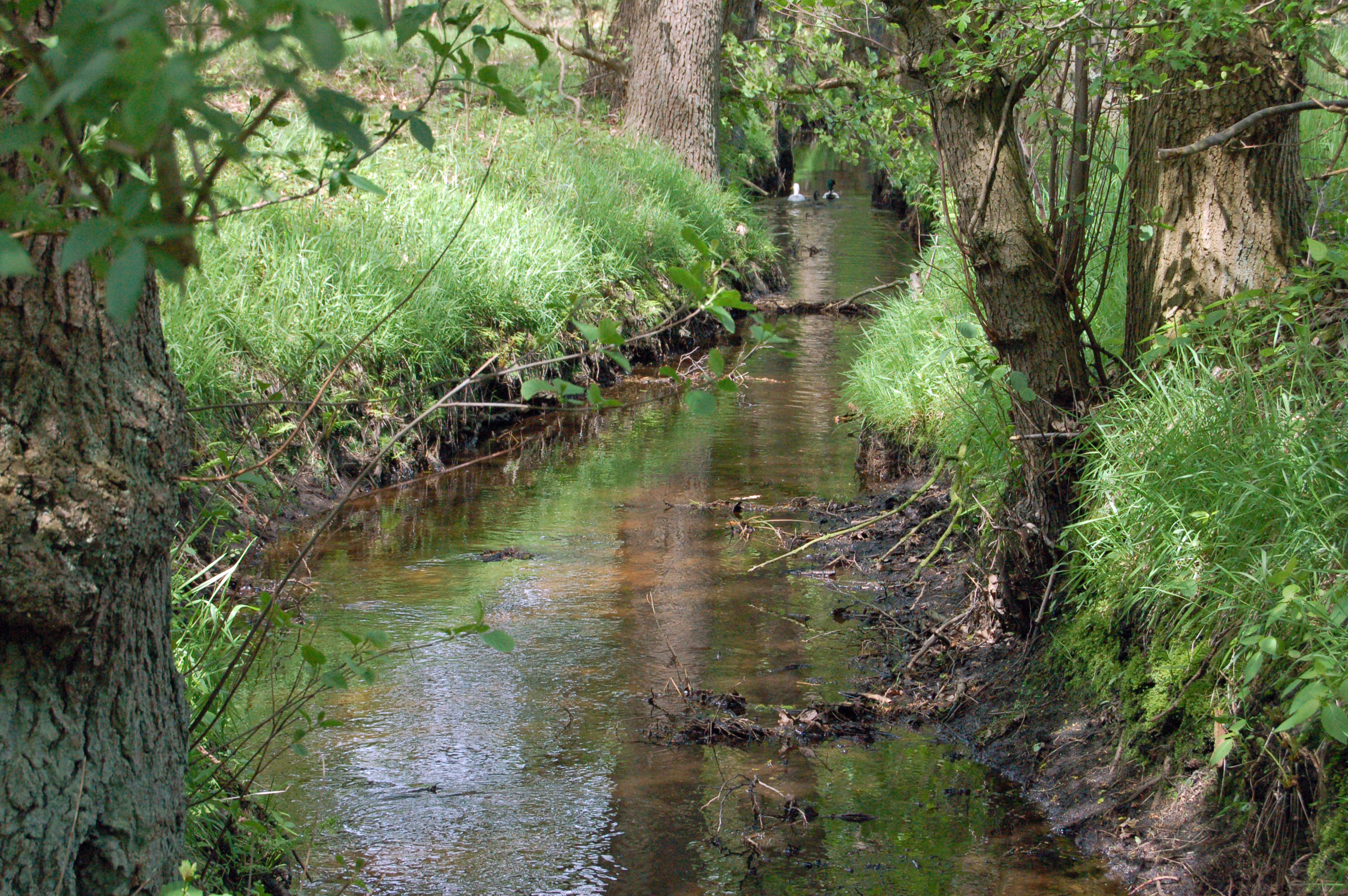

Location
- Country: Germany
- States: Schleswig-Holstein

Physical characteristics
- Mouth
  - location: Pinnau
  - coordinates: 53.6805°N 9.6683°E

Basin features
- Progression: Pinnau→ Elbe→ North Sea

Heidgraben is a small river in Schleswig-Holstein, Germany. It is a right tributary of the Pinnau in Uetersen.

== See also ==
- List of rivers of Schleswig-Holstein
