= Holstenau =

Coordinates: 54°01′N 9°19′E

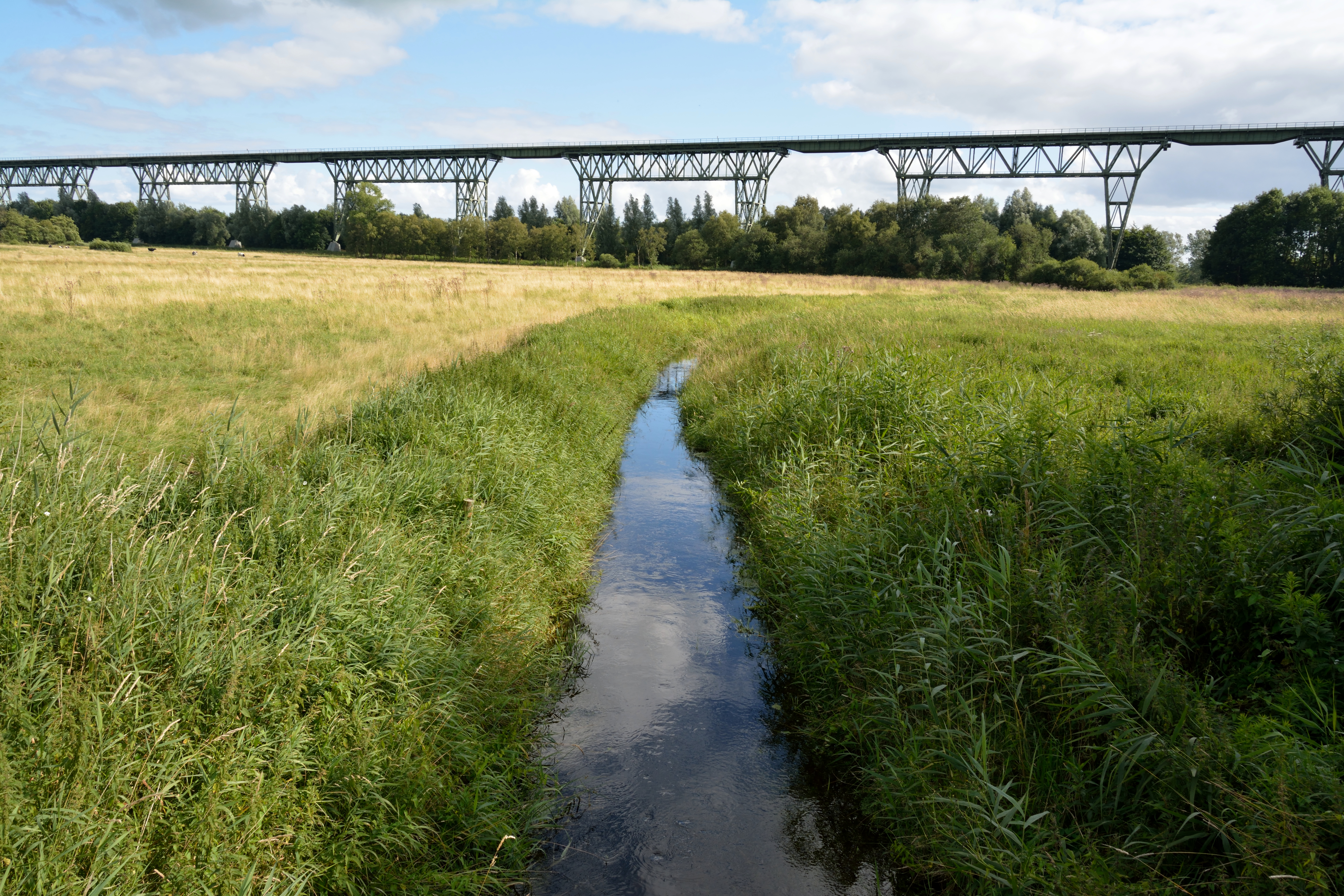

Location
- Country: Germany
- State: Schleswig-Holstein

Holstenau is a small river of Schleswig-Holstein, Germany. Its course has been intersected by the Kiel Canal in several places.

== See also ==
- List of rivers of Schleswig-Holstein
