= Schirnau =

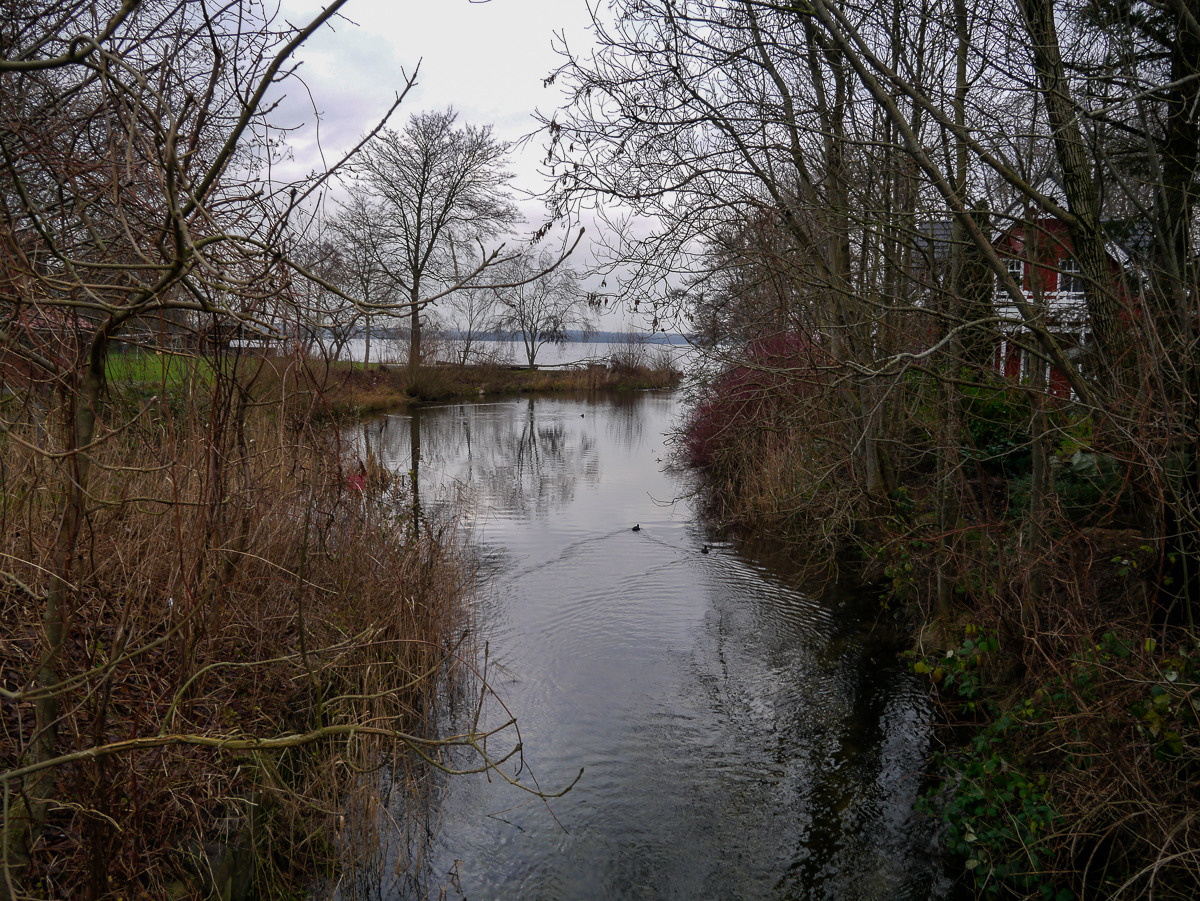
- Mouth of the river Schirnau

Location
- Country: Germany
- State: Schleswig-Holstein

Physical characteristics
- Mouth
  - location: Kiel Canal
  - coordinates: 54.3446°N 9.7501°E

Basin features
- Progression: Kiel Canal→ Elbe→ North Sea

Schirnau is a river of Schleswig-Holstein, Germany. It flows from the lake Wittensee to the Kiel Canal and has a length of 3 km (1.9 mi).

The first part of the rivers is within the village of Bünsdorf and contains several bridges. The next part passes through agricultural areas, while the second half is mostly flowing through unpopulated and hardly accessible wet areas, mostly on the western bank of the river. The final part near the farm Gut Schrinau is held back by a dam to form a small lake. Prior to the construction of the Kiel Canal it discharged into the river Eider below Gut Schrinau; nowadays it there discharges into the Kiel Canal.

== See also ==
- List of rivers of Schleswig-Holstein
