= Husumer Mühlenau =

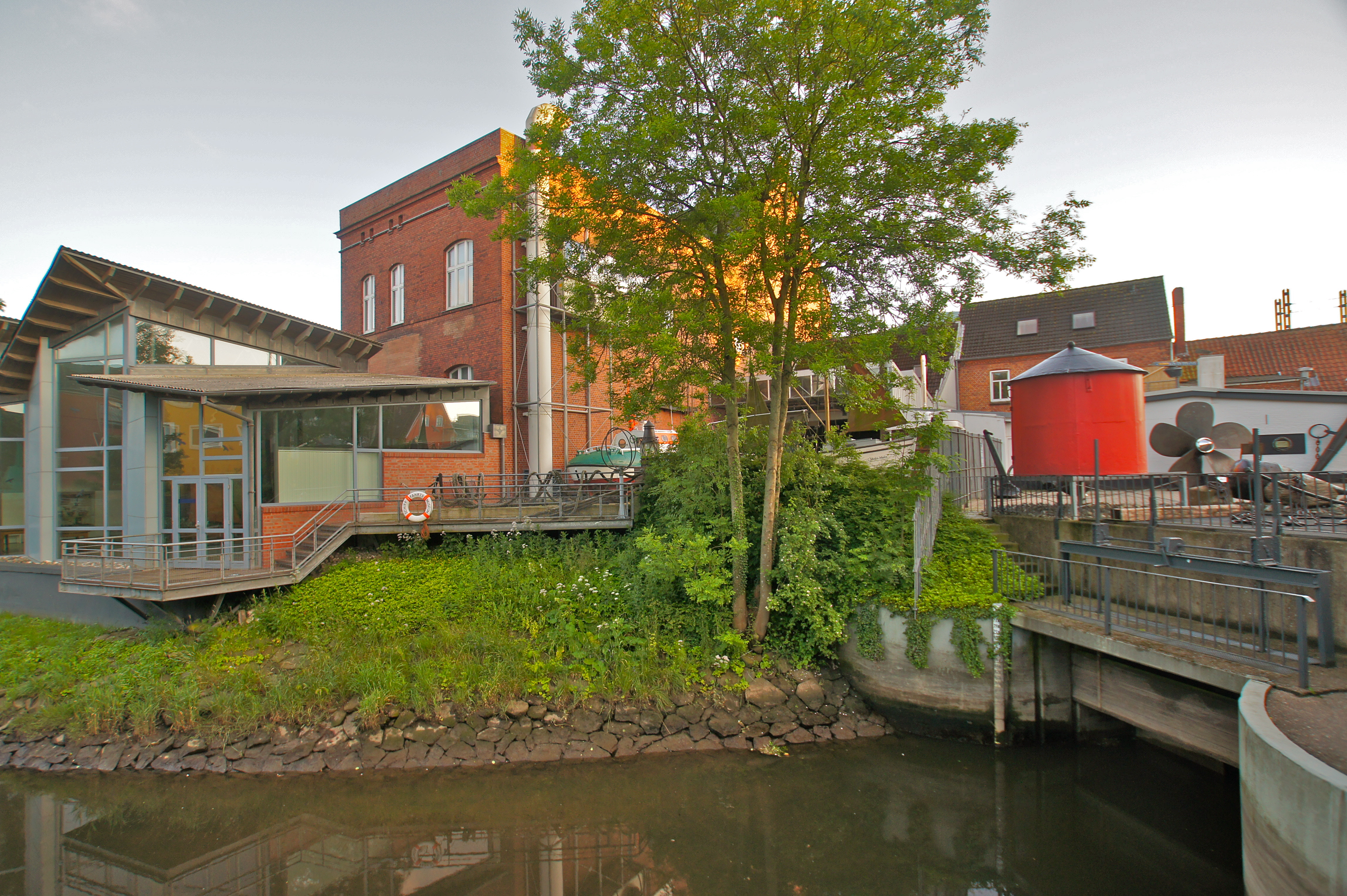

Location
- Country: Germany
- States: Schleswig-Holstein

Physical characteristics
- Mouth
  - location: North Sea
  - coordinates: 54°28′32″N 9°00′48″E

Husumer Mühlenau (German: [ˈhuːzʊmɐ ˈmyːlənaʊ]; Danish: Husum Mølleå) is a river of Schleswig-Holstein, Germany. It flows into the North Sea near Husum.

== See also ==
- List of rivers of Schleswig-Holstein
