= Hanerau =

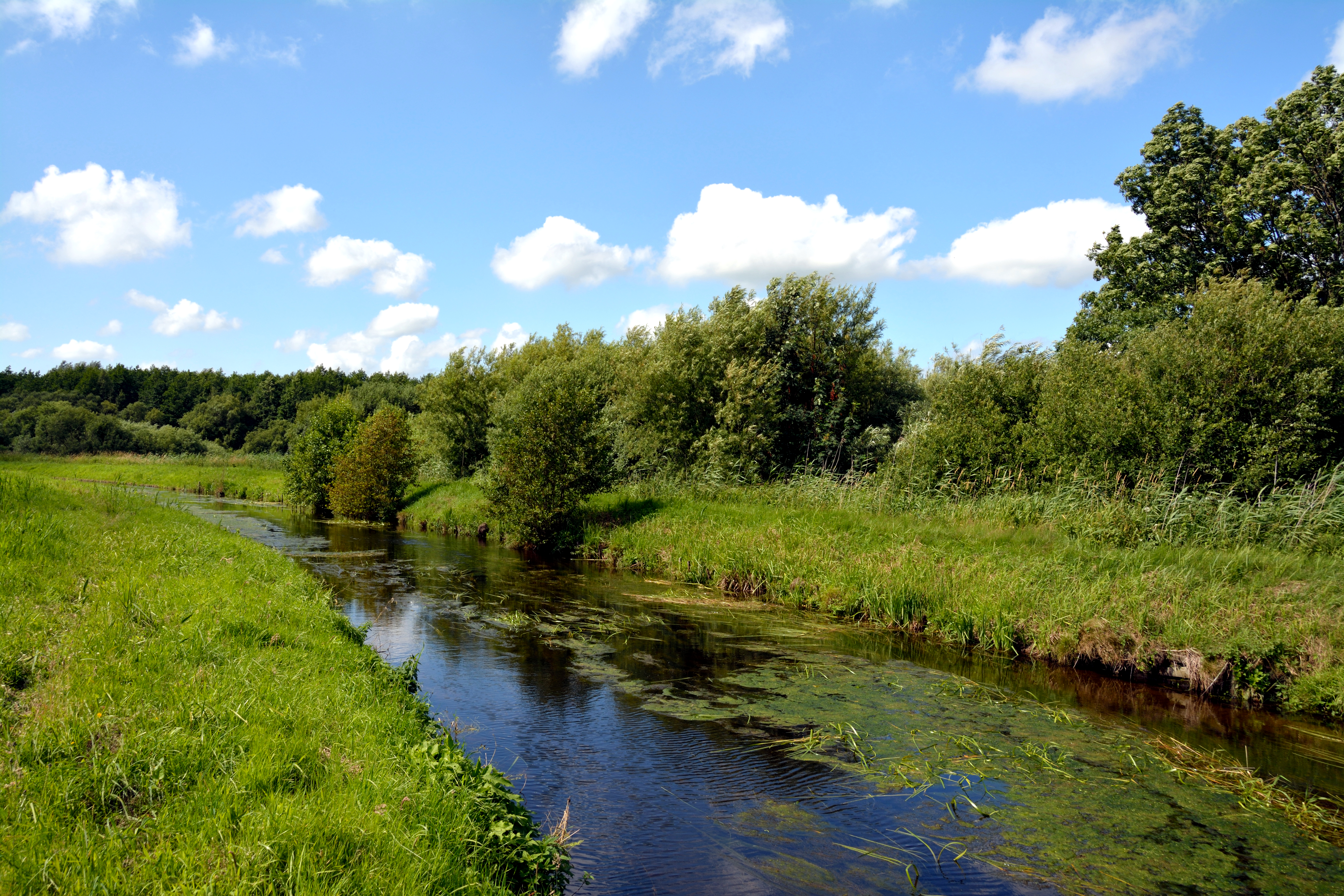

Location
- Country: Germany
- States: Schleswig-Holstein

Physical characteristics
- Mouth
  - location: Kiel Canal
  - coordinates: 54.1675°N 9.4298°E

Basin features
- Progression: Kiel Canal→ Elbe→ North Sea

Hanerau is a river of Schleswig-Holstein, Germany. It flows into the Kiel Canal near Oldenbüttel.

== See also ==
- List of rivers of Schleswig-Holstein
