= Klosterdeichwetter =

Location
- Country: Germany
- States: Schleswig-Holstein

Physical characteristics
- Mouth
  - location: Pinnau
  - coordinates: 53.6766°N 9.6578°E

Basin features
- Progression: Pinnau→ Elbe→ North Sea

Klosterdeichwetter is a small river of Schleswig-Holstein, Germany. It flows into the Pinnau near Uetersen.

== See also ==
- List of rivers of Schleswig-Holstein
