= Tensfelder Au =

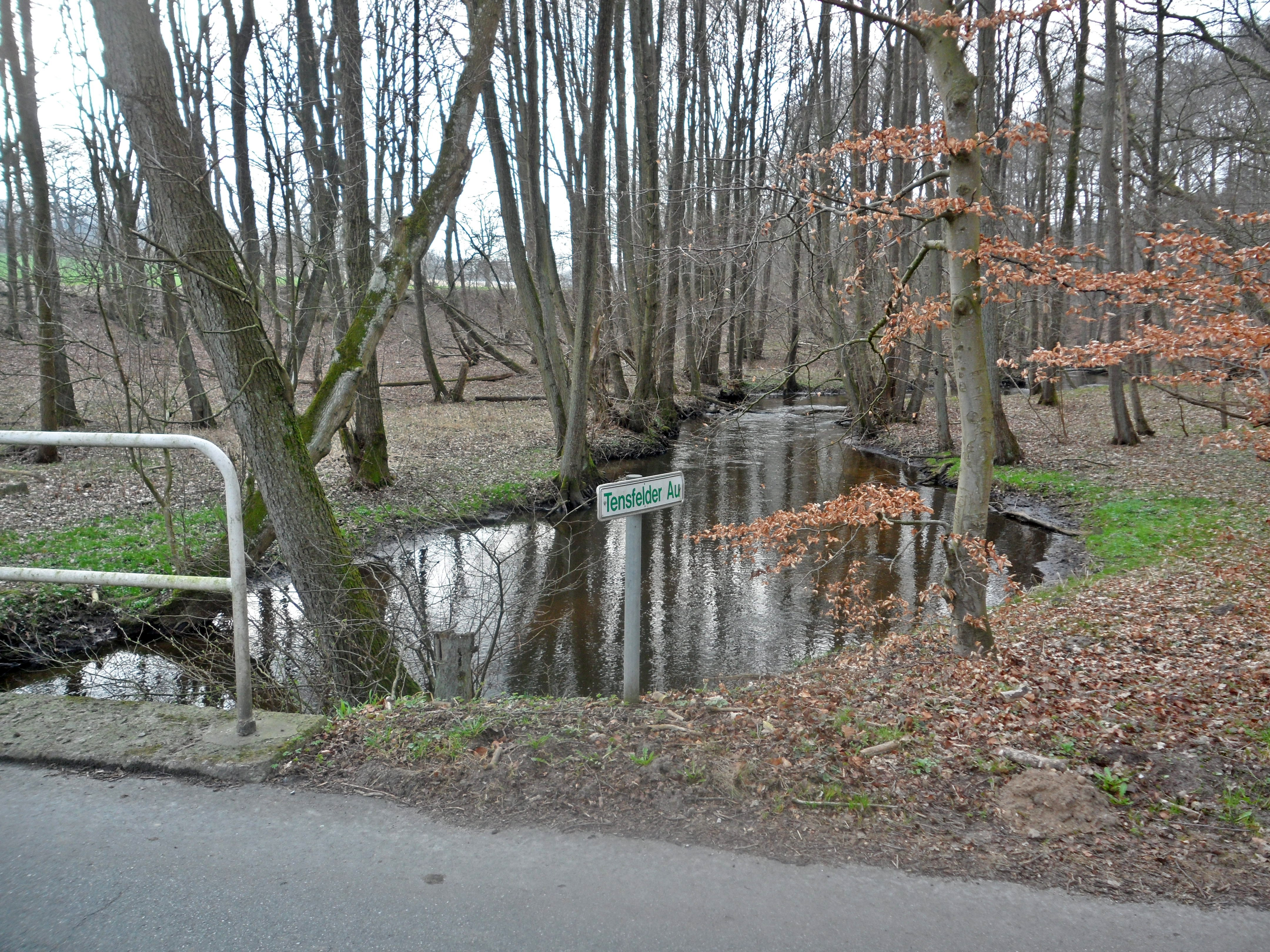
- Tensfelder Au near Nehmten

Location
- Country: Germany
- State: Schleswig-Holstein

Physical characteristics
- Mouth
  - location: Großer Plöner See
  - coordinates: 54.0892°N 10.3948°E

Basin features
- Progression: Schwentine→ Baltic Sea

Tensfelder Au (German pronunciation: [ˈtɛnt͡sˌfɛldɐ ˈaʊ̯]) is a river of Schleswig-Holstein, Germany. It springs north of the village of Blunk and then flows in a northeasterly direction through the town of Tensfeld and Hornsmühlen into the lake Großer Plöner See. After the Schwentine, the Tensfelder Au is the second largest river flowing into the Großer Plöner See.

== See also ==
- List of rivers of Schleswig-Holstein
