= Tielenau =

River in Germany

Location
- Country: Germany
- State: Schleswig-Holstein

Physical characteristics
- Source
  - location: North of Westerborstel
  - coordinates: 54.2313°N 9.2607°E
- Mouth
  - location: South of Erfde into the Eider
  - coordinates: 54.2801°N 9.3404°E

Basin features
- Progression: Eider→ North Sea

Tielenau is a river of Schleswig-Holstein, Germany.

The Tielenau springs north of Westerborstel. It is a left tributary of the Eider south of Erfde.

== See also ==
- List of rivers of Schleswig-Holstein
