= List of rivers of Schleswig-Holstein =

A list of rivers of Schleswig-Holstein, Germany:

== A ==
- Aalbek, flowing through the Hemmelsdorfer See and into the Baltic Sea
- Aalbek, tributary of the Stör
- Alster
- Alte Schwentine
- Arlau

== B ==
- Barnitz
- Basshornlaufgraben
- Bekau
- Beste
- Bille
- Bilsbek
- Bilsener Bek
- Bißnitz
- Boize
- Bölkau
- Bondenau
- Bramau
- Bredenbek, tributary of the Alster
- Bredenbek, tributary of the Bünzau
- Broklandsau
- Brokstedter Au
- Buckener Au
- Bünzau

== C ==
- Clever Au
- Corbek
- Curauer Au

== D ==
- Delvenau
- Dosenbek
- Düpenau

== E ==
- Ebach
- Eider
- Elbe

== F ==
- Fackenburger Landgraben
- Flörkendorfer Mühlenau
- Fuhlenau
- Füsinger Au

== G ==
- Gieselau
- Glinder Au
- Godel
- Gösebek
- Gronau

== H ==
- Haaler Au
- Hagener Au
- Hanerau
- Heidgraben, tributary of the Pinnau near Moorrege
- Heidgraben, tributary of the Pinnau in Uetersen
- Heilsau
- Hohenfelder Mühlenau
- Höllenau
- Holstenau
- Hornbeker Mühlenbach
- Hudau
- Husumer Mühlenau

== J ==
- Jarbek
- Jevenau

== K ==
- Klosterdeichwetter
- Kossau
- Krambek
- Krempau
- Krückau
- Krumbek

== L ==
- Lankau
- Levensau
- Lindenerau
- Lottbek
- Luhnau

== M ==
- Medebek
- Meiereibach
- Miele
- Mitbek
- Mühlenau, tributary of the Bekau
- Mühlenau, tributary of the Pinnau
- Mühlenbarbeker Au
- Mühlenbek

== N ==
- Niederelbe
- Norderbeste

== O ==
- Ohlau
- Ohrtbrookgraben
- Ostenau
- Osterau, tributary of the Bramau
- Osterau, tributary of the Broklandsau

== P ==
- Pinnau

== R ==
- Rantzau
- Rellau
- Rheider Au
- Rhin

== S ==
- Salzau
- Schirnau
- Schmalfelder Au
- Schwale
- Schwartau
- Schwarze Au
- Schwentine
- Sorge
- Spöck
- Stecknitz
- Stegau
- Stepenitz
- Stör

== T ==
- Tarpenbek
- Tensfelder Au
- Tielenau
- Trave
- Treene

== U ==
- Unterelbe

== W ==
- Wakenitz
- Wandse
- Wedeler Au
- Wehrau
- Wierbek
- Wilsterau
