= Clever Au =

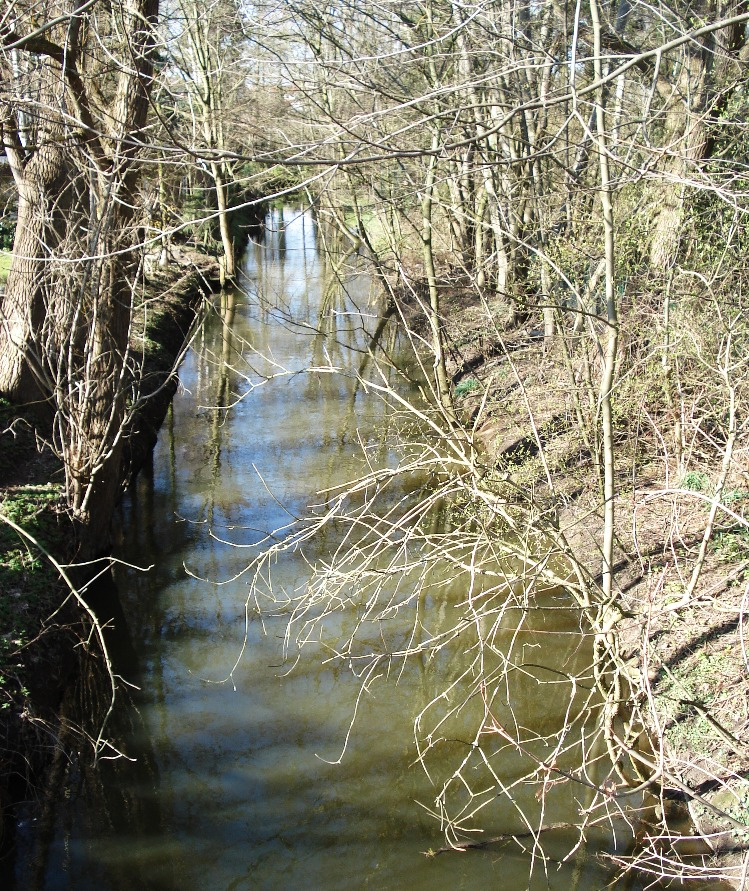

Location
- Country: Germany
- State: Schleswig-Holstein

Physical characteristics
- Mouth
  - location: Tremser Teich
  - coordinates: 53°54′10″N 10°41′04″E

Basin features
- Progression: Mühlenbach→ Trave→ Baltic Sea

Clever Au (German pronunciation: [ˈkleːvɐ ˈaʊ̯]) is a river of Schleswig-Holstein, Germany. It flows into the pond Tremser Teich, which is drained by the Trave via the Mühlenbach, near Lübeck.

== See also ==
- List of rivers of Schleswig-Holstein
