= Gronau (Pinnau) =

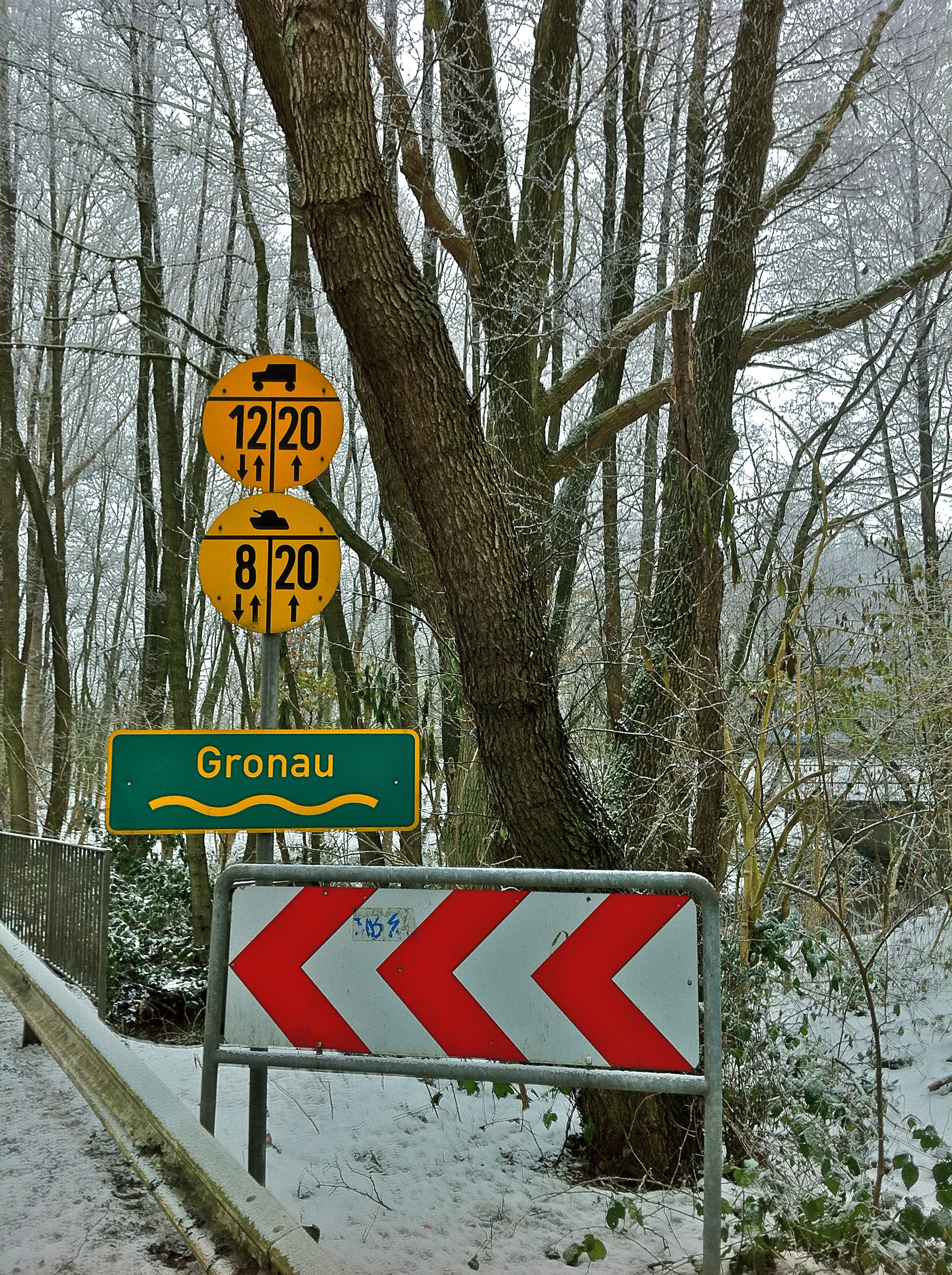

Location
- Country: Germany
- States: Schleswig-Holstein

Physical characteristics
- Mouth
  - location: Pinnau
  - coordinates: 53°45′08″N 9°53′32″E

Basin features
- Progression: Pinnau→ Elbe→ North Sea

Gronau (German pronunciation: [ˈɡʁoːnaʊ]) is a river of Schleswig-Holstein, Germany. It flows into the Pinnau near Ellerau.

== See also ==
- List of rivers of Schleswig-Holstein
