= Godel (river) =

River in Germany

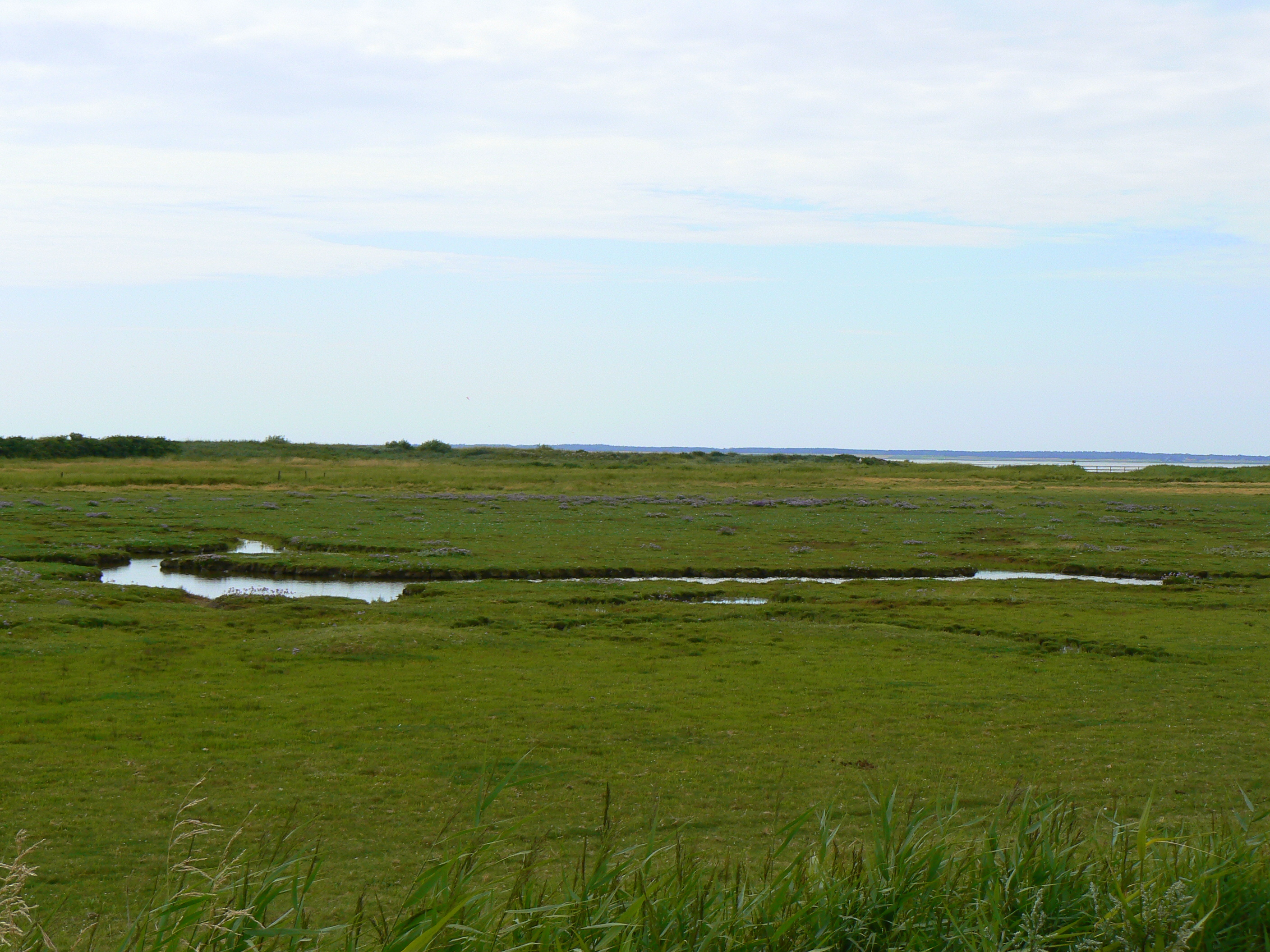

Location
- Country: Germany
- State: Schleswig-Holstein

Physical characteristics
- Source
  - location: at Witsum and Utersum
  - coordinates: 54.6957°N 8.4249°E
- Mouth
  - location: Southwest of Witsum into the North Sea
  - coordinates: 54.6926°N 8.4455°E

Basin features
- Progression: North Sea

Godel is a river of the North Frisian island Föhr, Schleswig-Holstein, Germany.

The Godel springs at Witsum and Utersum from several tidal creeks. It discharges southeast of Witsum into the North Sea.

== Gallery ==
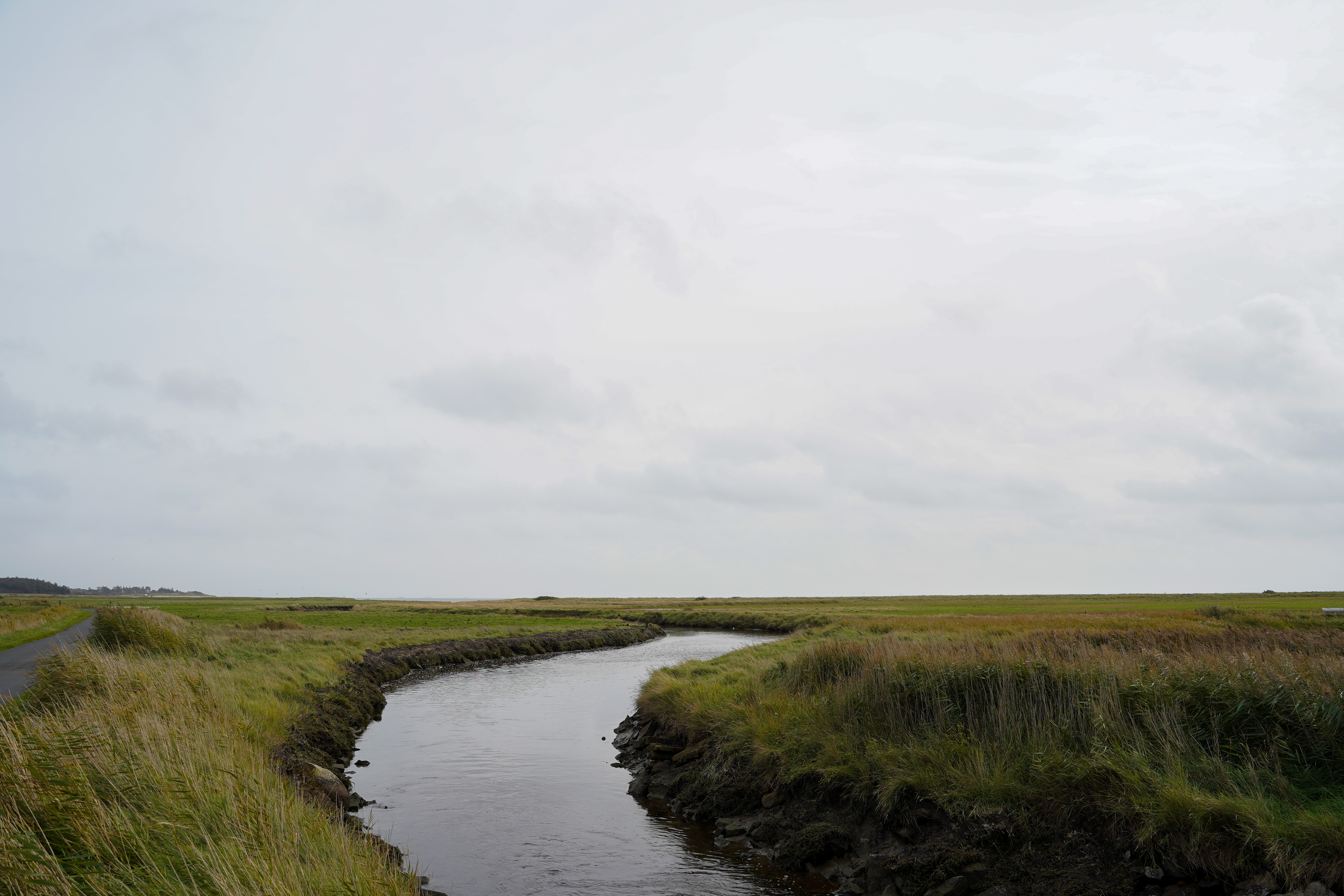
River Godel near Witsum (viewing direction south-east)

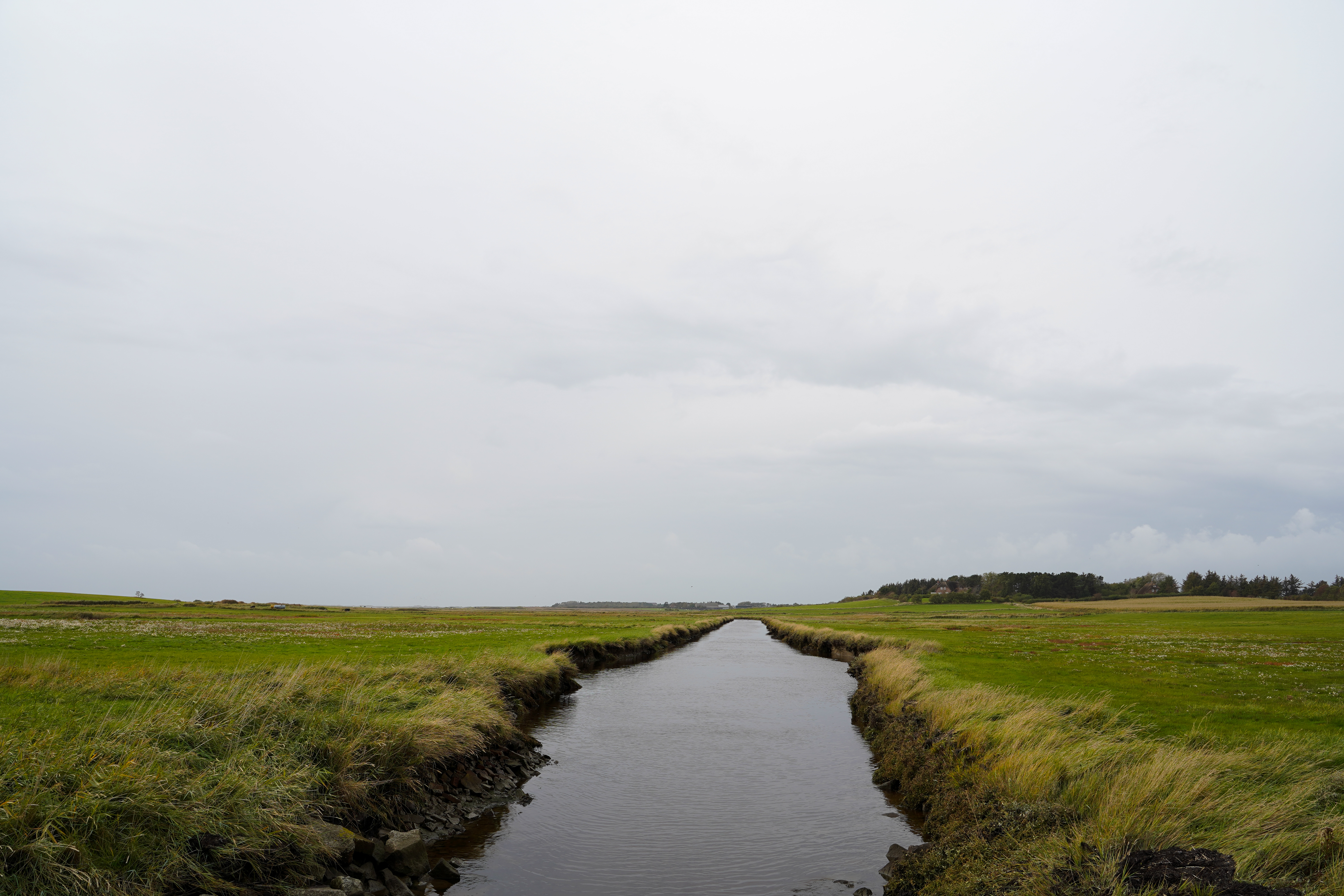
River Godel near Witsum (viewing direction north-west)

== See also ==
- List of rivers of Schleswig-Holstein
