= Østerå (disambiguation) =

Østerå or Österå may refer to:

== Places ==
- Østerå, village in the municipality of Tvedestrand in Aust-Agder county, Norway
- Österå, village in Västerbotten, Sweden
- Østerå River, river near Aalborg, Denmark
- Østerå River (Nome), river in Nome municipality in Telemark county, Norway

== See also ==
- Østerås
- Osterau (Broklandsau)
- Osterau (Bramau)
