= Wehrau (river) =

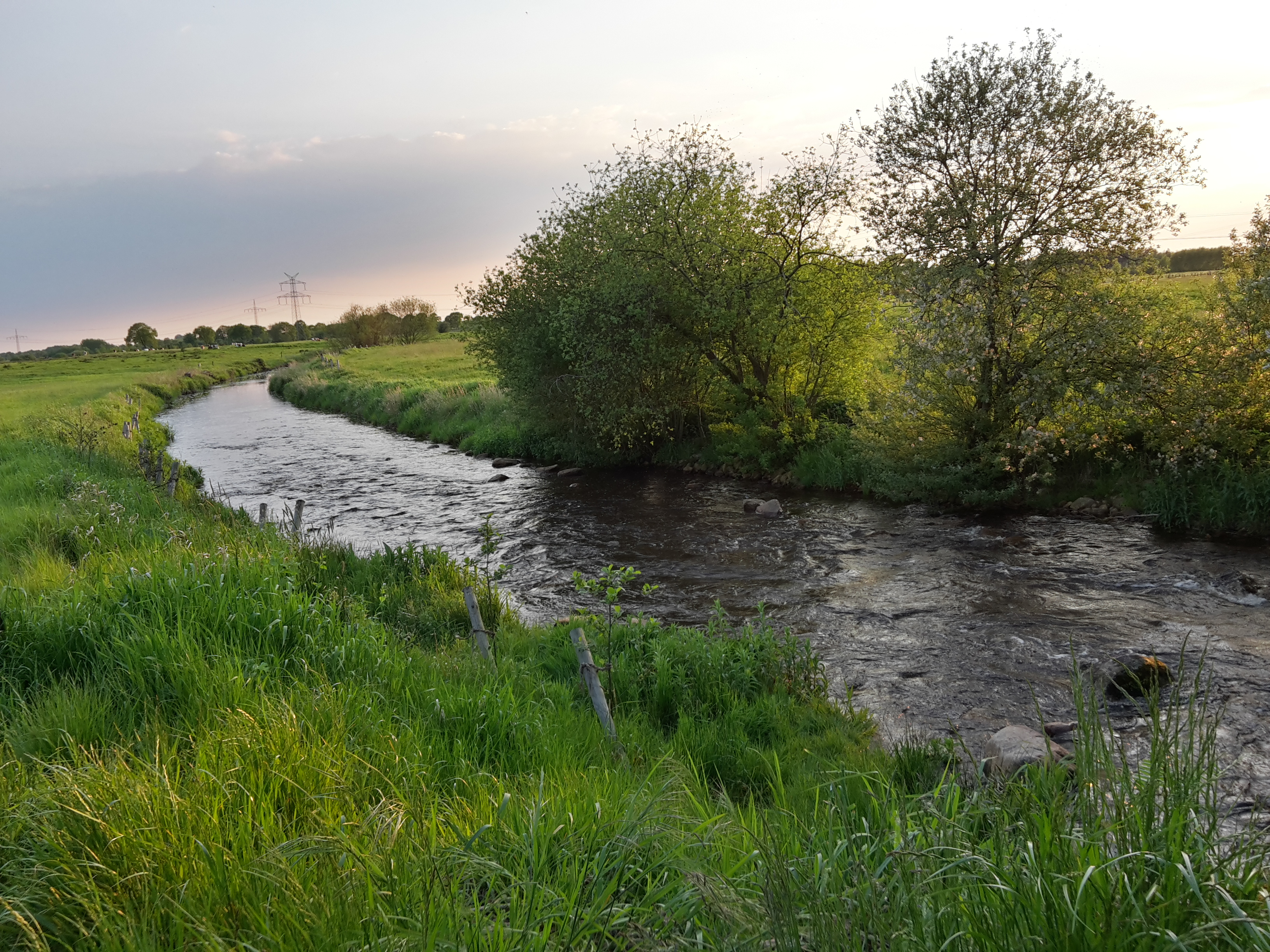

Location
- Country: Germany
- State: Schleswig-Holstein

Physical characteristics
- Mouth
  - location: Kiel Canal
  - coordinates: 54.2922°N 9.6801°E

Basin features
- Progression: Kiel Canal→ Elbe→ North Sea

Wehrau is a river of Schleswig-Holstein, Germany. It flows into the Kiel Canal near Rendsburg. The river is a small tributary in the region and contributes to the local drainage system that connects with the larger Baltic Sea waterway.

== See also ==
- List of rivers of Schleswig-Holstein
