= Osterau (Broklandsau) =

Location
- Country: Germany
- States: Schleswig-Holstein

Physical characteristics
- Mouth
  - location: Broklandsau
  - coordinates: 54.234936°N 9.192778°E

Basin features
- Progression: Broklandsau→ Eider→ North Sea

Osterau is a tributary river of the Broklandsau in Schleswig-Holstein, Germany.

== See also ==
- List of rivers of Schleswig-Holstein
