= Aalbek (Hemmelsdorfer See) =

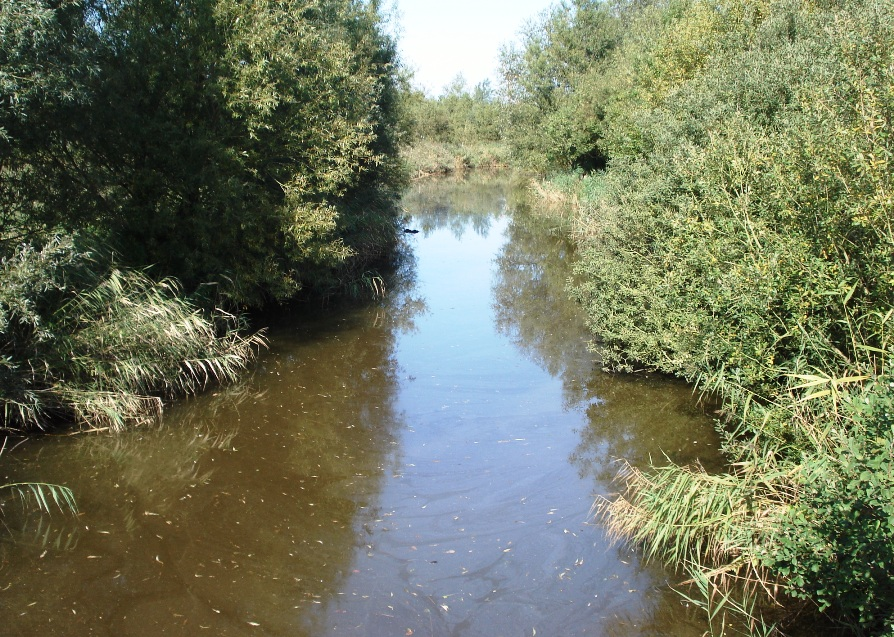

Location
- Country: Germany
- State: Schleswig-Holstein

Physical characteristics
- Source: Ruppersdorfer See
- Mouth
  - location: Baltic Sea
  - coordinates: 53°59′33.6″N 10°48′54.73″E

Aalbek (sometimes also Aalbeek) is a small river of Schleswig-Holstein, Germany. It drains the lake Ruppersdorfer See, flows through the Hemmelsdorfer See, and flows into the Baltic Sea near Timmendorfer Strand.

== See also ==
- List of rivers of Schleswig-Holstein
