= Schwartau =

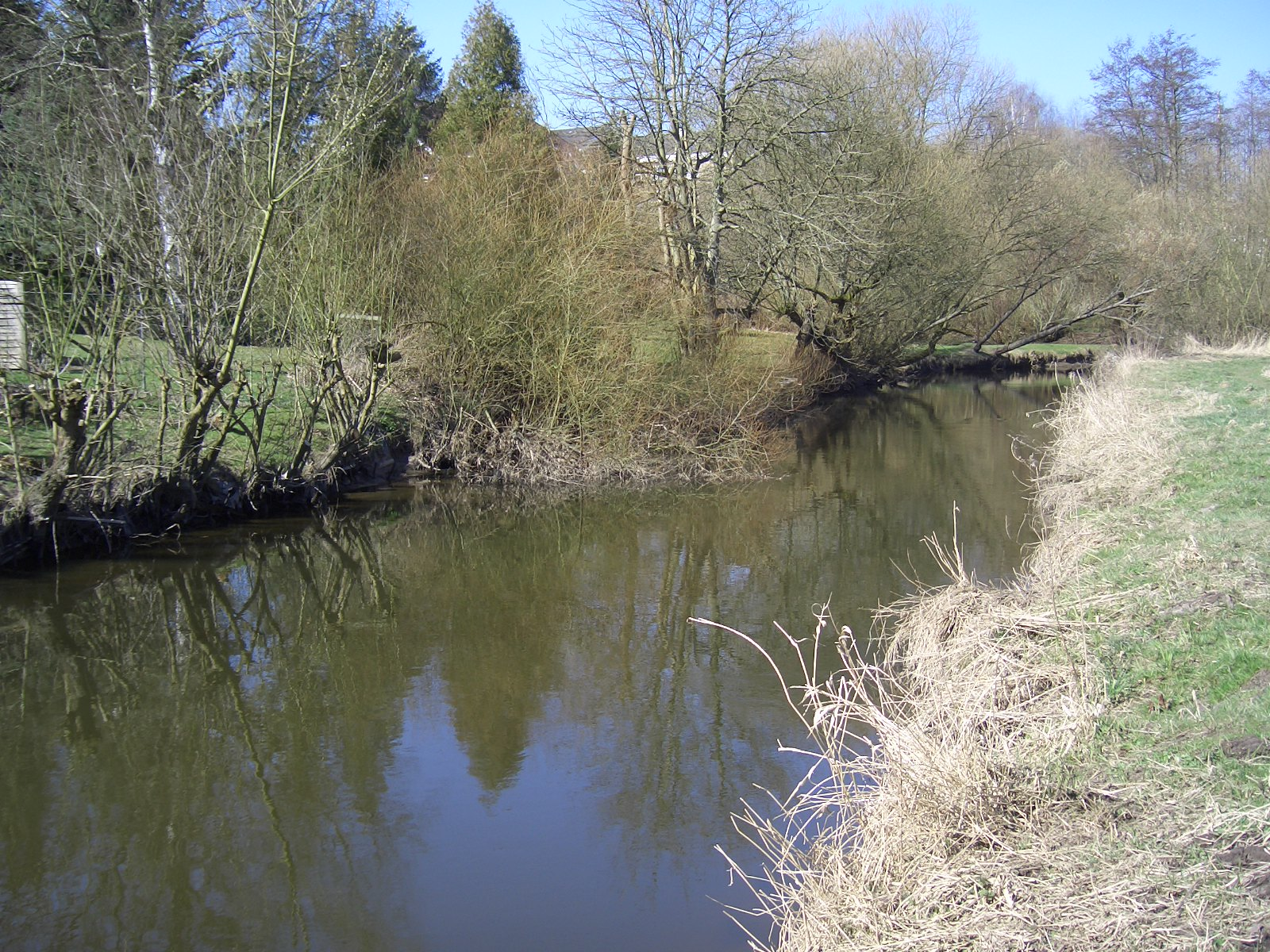

Location
- Country: Germany
- State: Schleswig-Holstein

Physical characteristics
- Mouth
  - location: Trave
  - coordinates: 53.9074°N 10.7173°E

Basin features
- Progression: Trave→ Baltic Sea

The Schwartau is a river of Schleswig-Holstein, Germany. It flows into the Trave near Bad Schwartau, eventually reaching the Baltic Sea.

== See also ==
- List of rivers of Schleswig-Holstein
