= Hörsten =

- Municipality
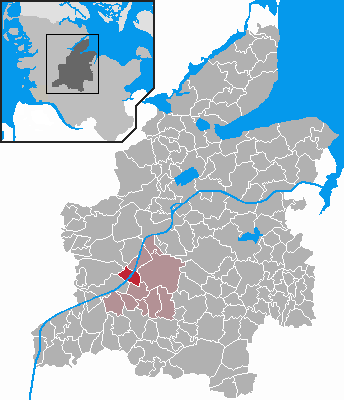
- Location of Hörsten within Rendsburg-Eckernförde district
- Interactive map of Hörsten
- Location within Germany Location within Schleswig-Holstein
- Coordinates: 54°14′N 9°35′E
- Country: Germany
- State: Schleswig-Holstein
- District: Rendsburg-Eckernförde
- Municipal assoc.: Jevenstedt

Government
  - Mayor: Klaus Groenewold

Area
  - Total: 8.83 km^{2} (3.41 sq mi)
- Elevation: 9 m (30 ft)

Population (2025-12-31)
  - Total: 66
  - Density: 7.5/km^{2} (19/sq mi)
- Time zone: UTC+01:00 (CET)
  - Summer (DST): UTC+02:00 (CEST)
- Postal codes: 24797
- Dialling codes: 04332
- Vehicle registration: RD
- Website: www.amt-jevenstedt.de

Hörsten (German pronunciation: [ˈhœʁstn̩]) is a municipality in the district of Rendsburg-Eckernförde, in Schleswig-Holstein, Germany.
