= Broklandsau =

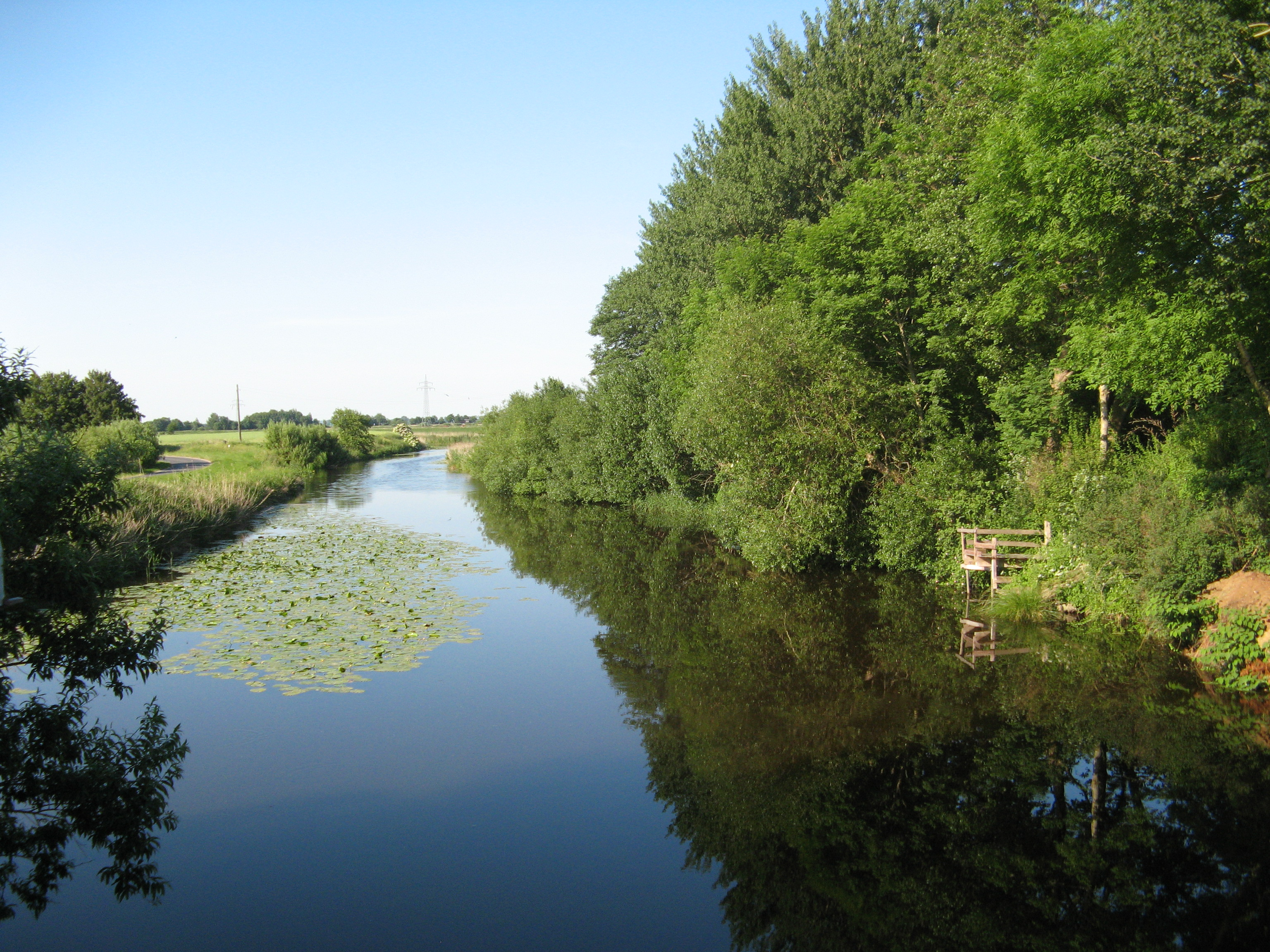

Location
- Country: Germany
- State: Schleswig-Holstein

Physical characteristics
- Mouth
  - location: Eider
  - coordinates: 54.3250°N 9.1420°E

Basin features
- Progression: Eider→ North Sea

Broklandsau is a small river of Schleswig-Holstein, Germany. It flows into the Eider near Kleve.

== See also ==
- List of rivers of Schleswig-Holstein
