= Stör =

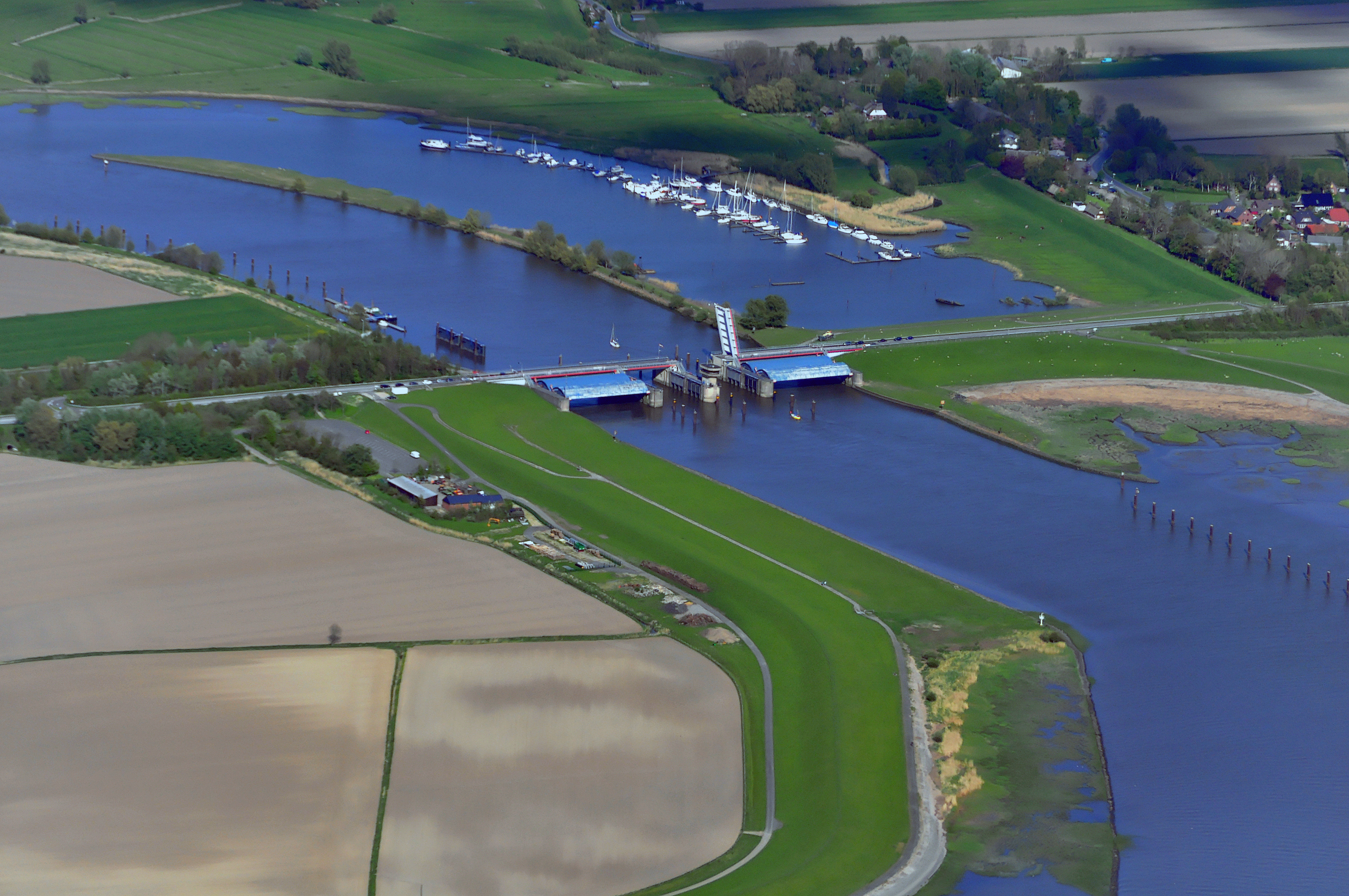

Location
- Country: Germany
- State: Schleswig-Holstein

Physical characteristics
- Source
  - location: East of Neumünster
- Mouth
  - location: Elbe
  - coordinates: 53°49′15″N 9°23′30″E
- Length: 87 km (54 mi)

Basin features
- Progression: Elbe→ North Sea

The Stör (German pronunciation: [ʃtøːɐ̯]) is a river in Schleswig-Holstein, Germany, right tributary of the Elbe.

Its total length is 87 kilometres (54 mi). The Stör rises east of Neumünster, and flows west through Neumünster, Kellinghusen, and Itzehoe. The Stör joins the Elbe near Glückstadt. The 27.5 km (17.1 mi) lower part between the Elbe and Itzehoe is navigable for Class III ships, the 23.7 km (14.7 mi) middle part between Itzehoe and Kellinghusen-Rensing is navigable but not classified.

== See also ==
- List of rivers of Schleswig-Holstein
