= Born Park =

Public park in Hamburg, Germany

Coordinates: 53.594°N 9.845°E

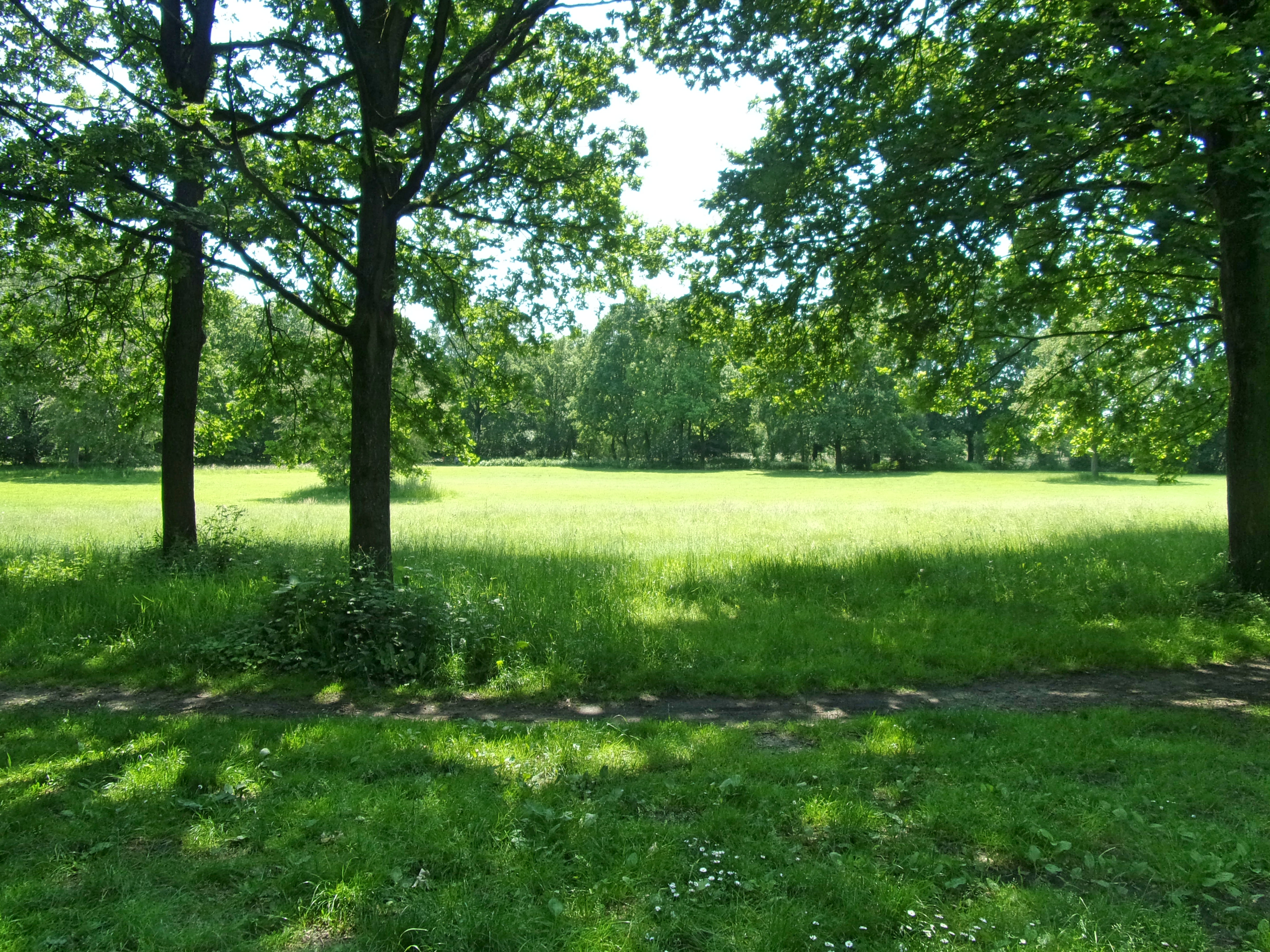
Bornpark in HH-Osdorf

Born Park (German: Bornpark) is public park in Osdorf, Hamburg, Germany. Located around Lake Helmuth Schack and the streams of Düpenau and Luruper Moorgraben, it is used as a recreational area mainly by the inhabitants of Osdorf, Osdorfer Born and nearby Schenefeld in Schleswig-Holstein. The park extends to an area of 13.4 hectares (33 acres).

== History ==
In the area of Lake Helmuth Schack, parts of the moor area of Deesmoor, a glacial moor valley, was located until the 1960s. After a weir was constructed, the area filled with water and served as a retention bassin. A community of anglers cared for it. A public park was then developed around the lake. The first section of Born Park was opened on 9 October 1982, the final opening was on 20 June 1986.

== Facilities ==
Within the park, a playground, a zone for dogs, a toboggan, a BMX track and the sports field "Kroonhorst" are located. At Lake Helmuth Schack, children and teenagers can borrow canoes and learn to paddle. A public outdoor pool is located in the Osdorfer Feldmark (Osdorf fields) south of the Bornpark. Before the construction of the outdoor pool, a bathing pond, the so-called "Born", was located there.

== Reception ==
Die Tageszeitung wrote that the park as the green vicinity of Osdorfer Born helps to let the quarter appear "like an idyll".
