= Ebach =

Location
- Country: Germany
- State: Schleswig-Holstein

Physical characteristics
- Mouth
  - location: Pinnau
  - coordinates: 53.7647°N 9.9014°E

Basin features
- Progression: Pinnau→ Elbe→ North Sea

Ebach is a river of Schleswig-Holstein, Germany. It flows into the Pinnau near Ellerau.The Ebach is a left tributary of the Pinnau. It rises in Henstedt-Ulzburg on the border with Ellerau and flows westward under the I-7 freeway. In addition to Henstedt-Ulzburg and Ellerau, it also flows through a short section of Alveslohe. Further on, the Ebach flows under State Road 234 (Alvesloher Straße) and joins the Pinnau on the left in northern Ellerau. The source was originally in Alveslohe, but after a municipal reorganization, it is now in Henstedt-Ulzburg.

== See also ==
- List of rivers of Schleswig-Holstein
