= Müllergraben =

River in Germany

Müllergraben (Miller's Ditch) is a small stream in the quarters of Lurup and Osdorf, Hamburg, Germany. It mainly flows near the street of Binsenort in Lurup, crosses the Böttcherkamp main road and finally flows into Luruper Moorgraben.

== History ==
The Müllergraben was used for the drainage of the Flaßbargmoor, next to the Deesmoor, one of two great bog areas in Osdorf and Lurup. Today, the bog is largely a residential area, but parts of the forest near the stream are still alive or were renaturalised during the recent years.

== See also ==
- List of rivers of Hamburg
