= Lake Helmuth Schack =

Lake in Osdorf, Hamburg, Germany

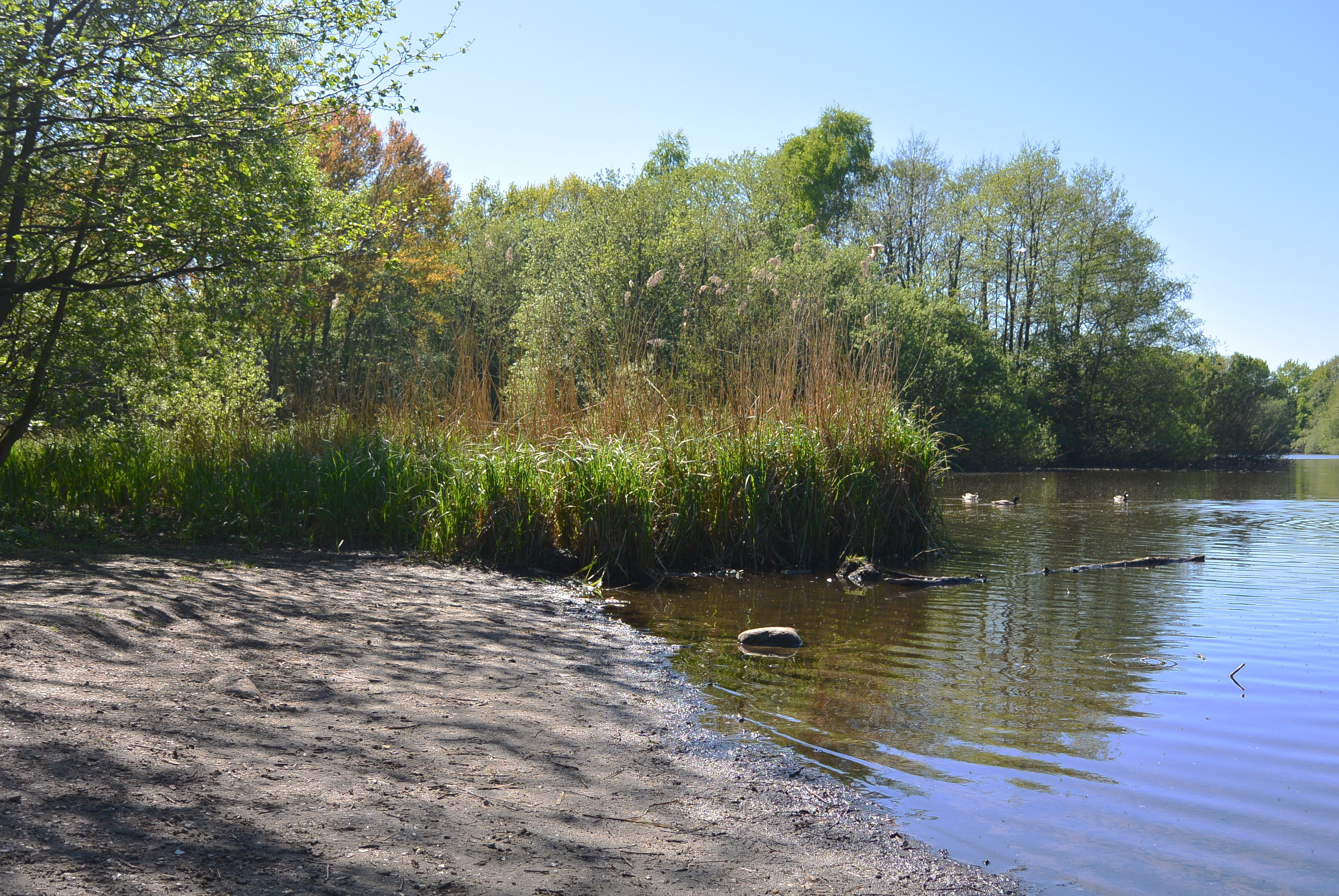
Banks of Lake Helmuth Schack

Lake Helmuth Schack (German: Helmuth-Schack-See or simply Schacksee) is a lake in Osdorf, Hamburg, Germany, adjacent to the boundaries of Schenefeld in Schleswig-Holstein. Düpenau stream runs through it, and the small stream of Luruper Moorgraben flows into it.

== History ==
Lake Helmuth Schack is located in the Born Park and was created artificially as a retention basin for the regulation of water levels. Before the establishment of the retention basin there was the Deesmoor, a remnant of the glacial moor valley on the northwest edge of the Osdorf fields. A weir was constructed, and the area was flooded. Over the years, the Born Park was developed around the Schacksee, which is today used as a recreational area, mostly by the inhabitants of Osdorf, Osdorfer Born and nearby Schenefeld in Schleswig-Holstein.
