= Meiereibach (Mühlenau) =

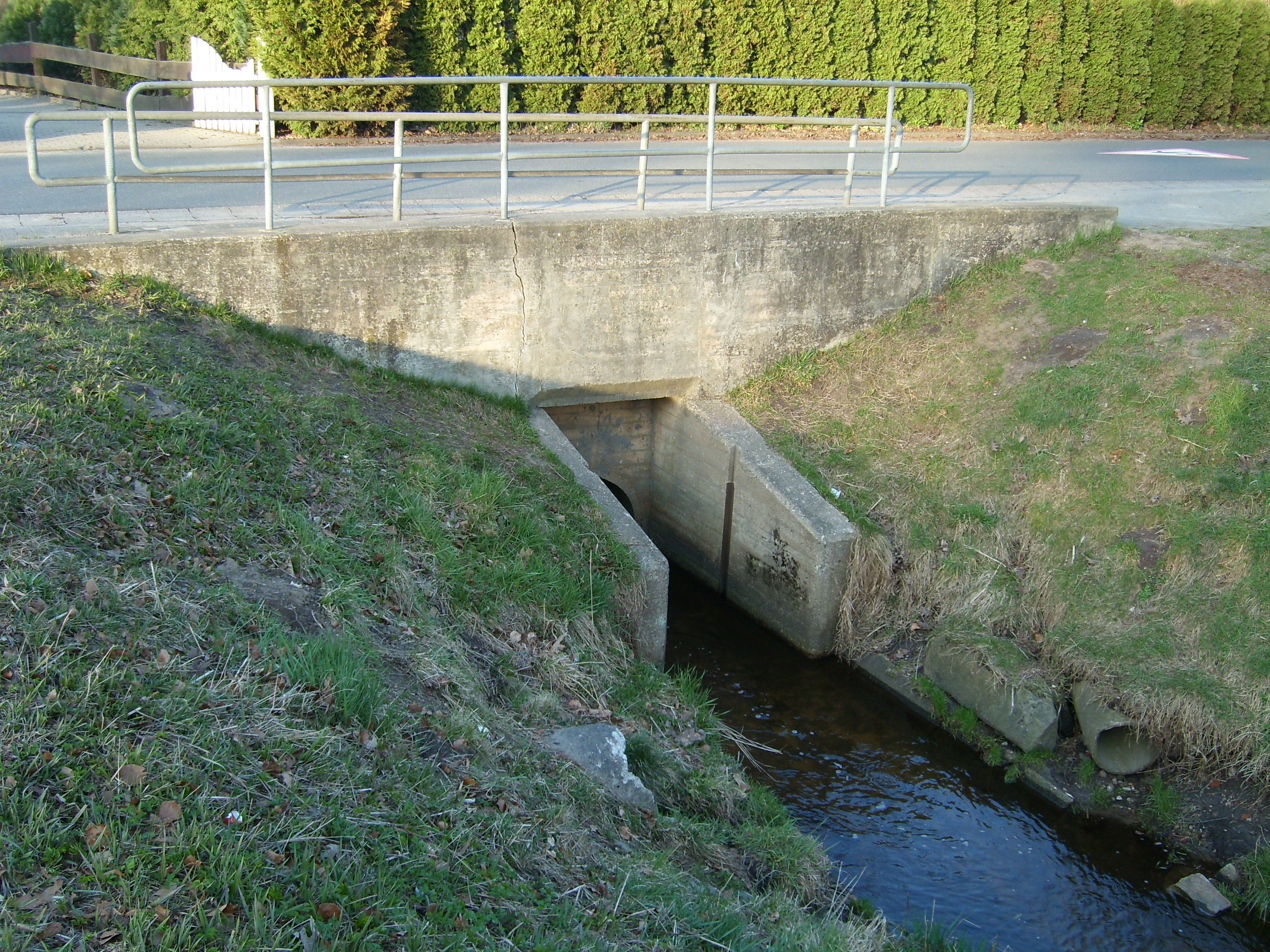

Location
- Country: Germany
- States: Schleswig-Holstein

Physical characteristics
- Mouth
  - location: Mühlenau
  - coordinates: 54°02′21″N 9°27′53″E

Basin features
- Progression: Mühlenau→ Bekau→ Stör→ Elbe→ North Sea

Meiereibach is a river of Schleswig-Holstein, Germany. It flows into the Mühlenau near Schenefeld.

== See also ==
- List of rivers of Schleswig-Holstein
