= Mühlenau =

Mühlenau may refer to:

- Mühlenau (Bekau), a river of Schleswig-Holstein, Germany
- Mühlenau (Rellau), a river of Schleswig-Holstein, Germany
