= Hermann Heinrich Becker =

Hermann Heinrich Becker may refer to:

- Hermann Heinrich Becker (politician) (1820–1885), German politician
- Hermann Heinrich Becker (painter) (1817–1885), German painter, art historian and author
