= Krambek =

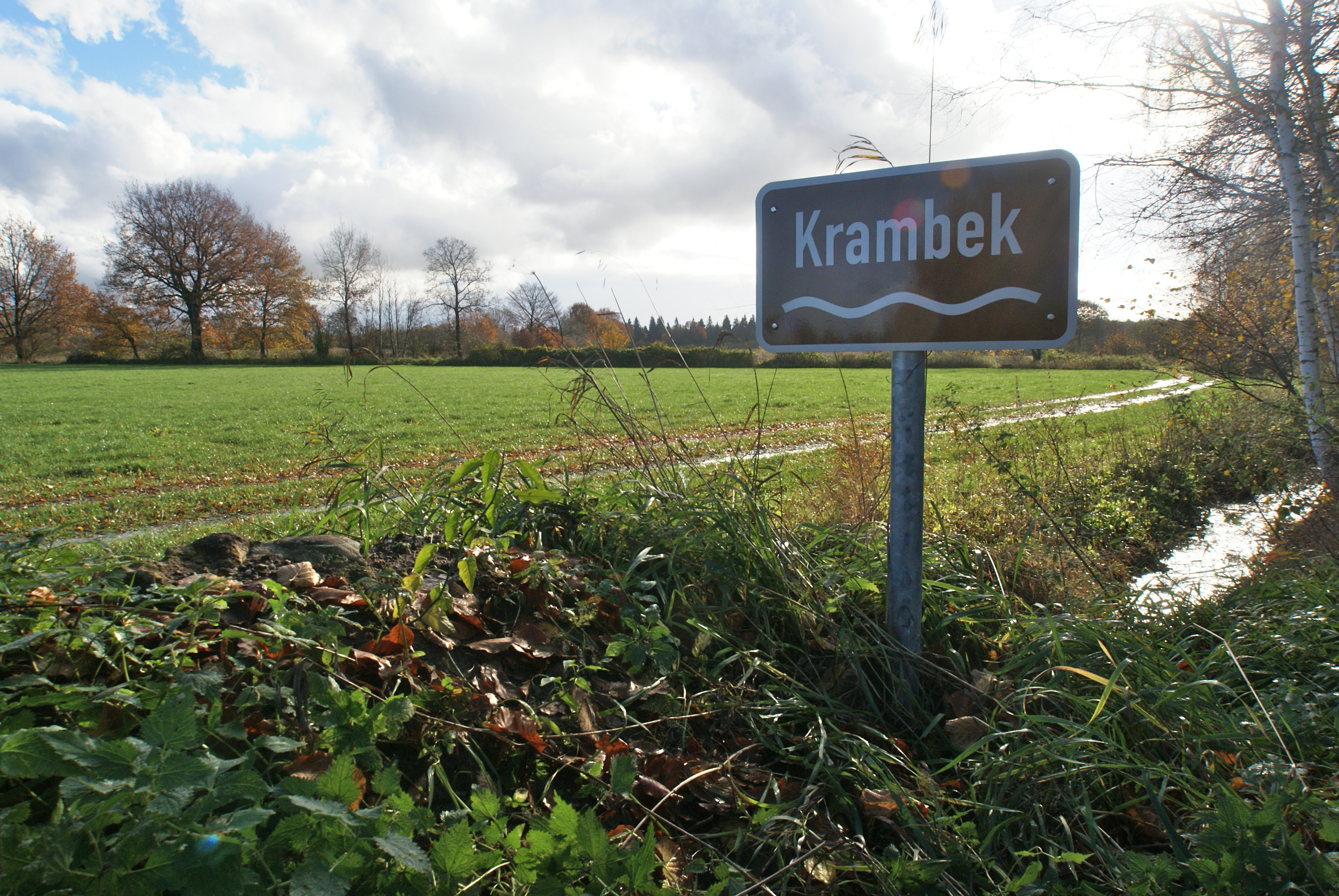

Location
- Country: Germany
- States: Schleswig-Holstein

Physical characteristics
- Mouth
  - location: Pinnau
  - coordinates: 53°47′06″N 9°59′01″E

Basin features
- Progression: Pinnau→ Elbe→ North Sea

Krambek is a small river of Schleswig-Holstein, Germany. It flows into the Pinnau in Henstedt-Ulzburg.

== See also ==
- List of rivers of Schleswig-Holstein
