= Luruper Moorgraben =

River in Germany

Location
- Country: Germany
- State: Hamburg

Physical characteristics
- Source
  - location: Osdorf
- Mouth
  - location: Lake Helmuth Schack
  - coordinates: 53°35′40″N 9°50′41″E

Luruper Moorgraben (Lurup Bog Ditch) is a small stream in Osdorf, Hamburg, Germany, partially marking the boundaries of Lurup, Hamburg, after which it is named. It comes to the surface near the street of Knüllkamp in Osdorf. Nearby, from the right, the small stream of Müllergraben flows into Luruper Moorgraben. It then crosses the street of Bornheide, the main road of Osdorfer Born. Finally it flows into Lake Helmuth Schack in the recreational area of Born Park.

== See also ==
- List of rivers of Hamburg
