= Christoph Wilhelm Wohlien =

German painter

Carl Gottfried Eybe
- Born: 3 March 1811; Hamburg
- Died: 9 May 1869 (aged 58); Blankenese
- Occupations: painter, lithographer and sculptor

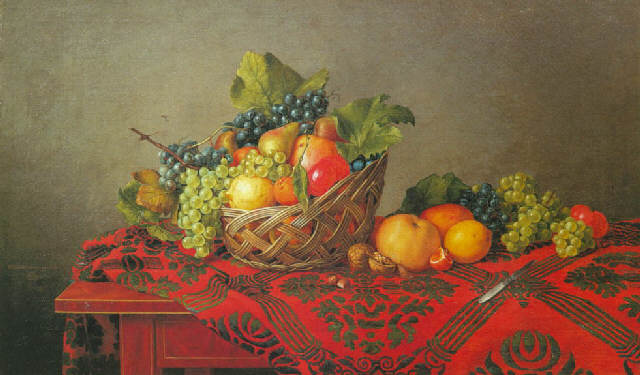
Fruit still life by Christoph Wilhelm Wohlien

Christoph Wilhelm Wohlien (1811–1869) was a 19th-century German painter and lithographer.

Wohlien was born 3 March 1811 in Altona, Hamburg, son to Johann Heinrich Wohlien of the Wohlien family of organ builders with their own workshop in Altona. He was a pupil of Friedrich Carl Gröger, as was Carl Gottfried Eybe with whom Wohlien shared a lifelong friendship. He died 9 May 1869.
