= Bilsbek =

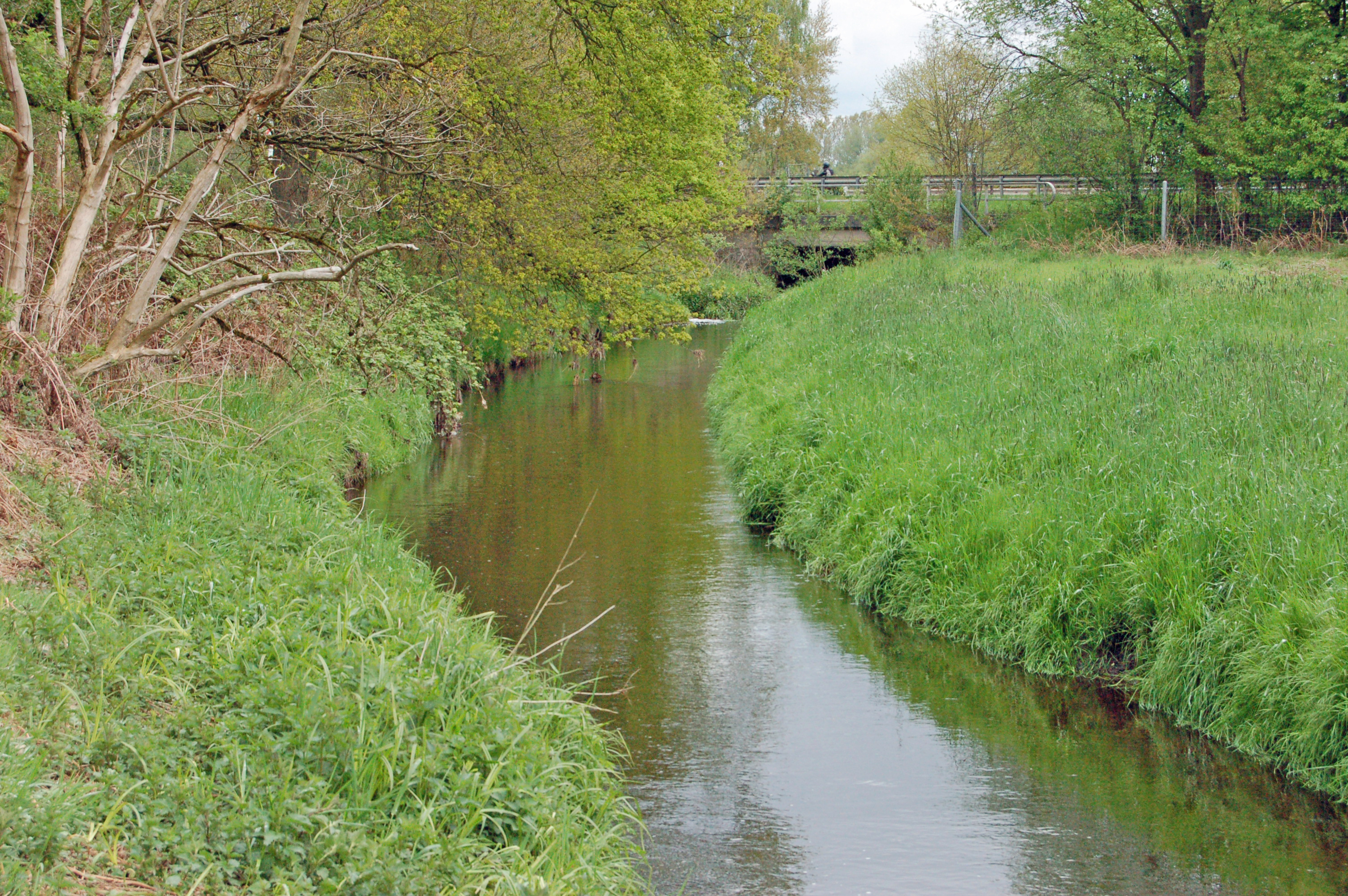

Location
- Country: Germany
- State: Schleswig-Holstein

Physical characteristics
- Mouth
  - location: Pinnau
  - coordinates: 53.6748°N 9.7458°E

Basin features
- Progression: Pinnau→ Elbe→ North Sea

Bilsbek is a river of Schleswig-Holstein, Germany. It flows into the Pinnau near Prisdorf.

== See also ==
- List of rivers of Schleswig-Holstein
