= Johann Heinrich Wohlien =

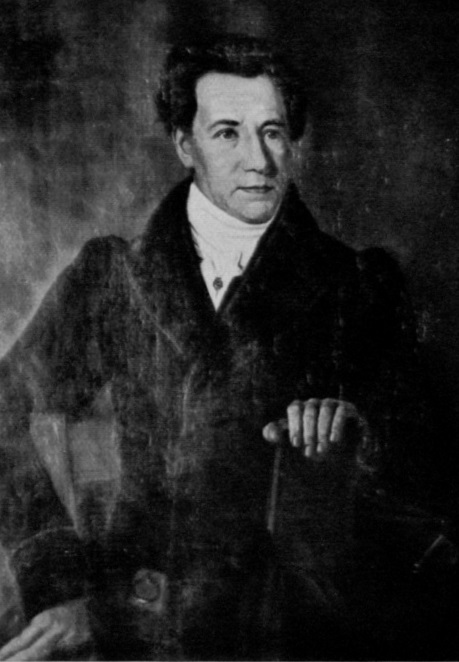
Painting of J.H. Wohlien by Christoph Wilhelm Wohlien (1835)

Johann Heinrich Wohlien (1779–1842), also known as Johann Hinrich Wohlien, or Wohlin and Wollin, was a German master organ builder.

Wohlien was born at Altona in Hamburg, the son to the organ builder Balthasar Wohlien (1745, Wilster – 1804, Hamburg). His brother was the piano and organ builder Lorenz Rudolph Wohlien with whom he formed the second generation of the family business. Wohlien moved the family workshop to Altona and at times worked together with his uncle Joachim Wilhelm Geycke. After 1804 the workshop was split, with Wohlien joining Johann Carl Eduard Erdland. The family business ended with Wohlien's grandson Johann Friedrich Eduard Wohlien (1843–1871), son to Johann Conrad Rudolph Wohlien.

His son was the painter and lithographer Christoph Wilhelm Wohlien (1811–1869). Johann Heinrich Wohlien died at Altona in 1842.
