= Pinnau (river) =

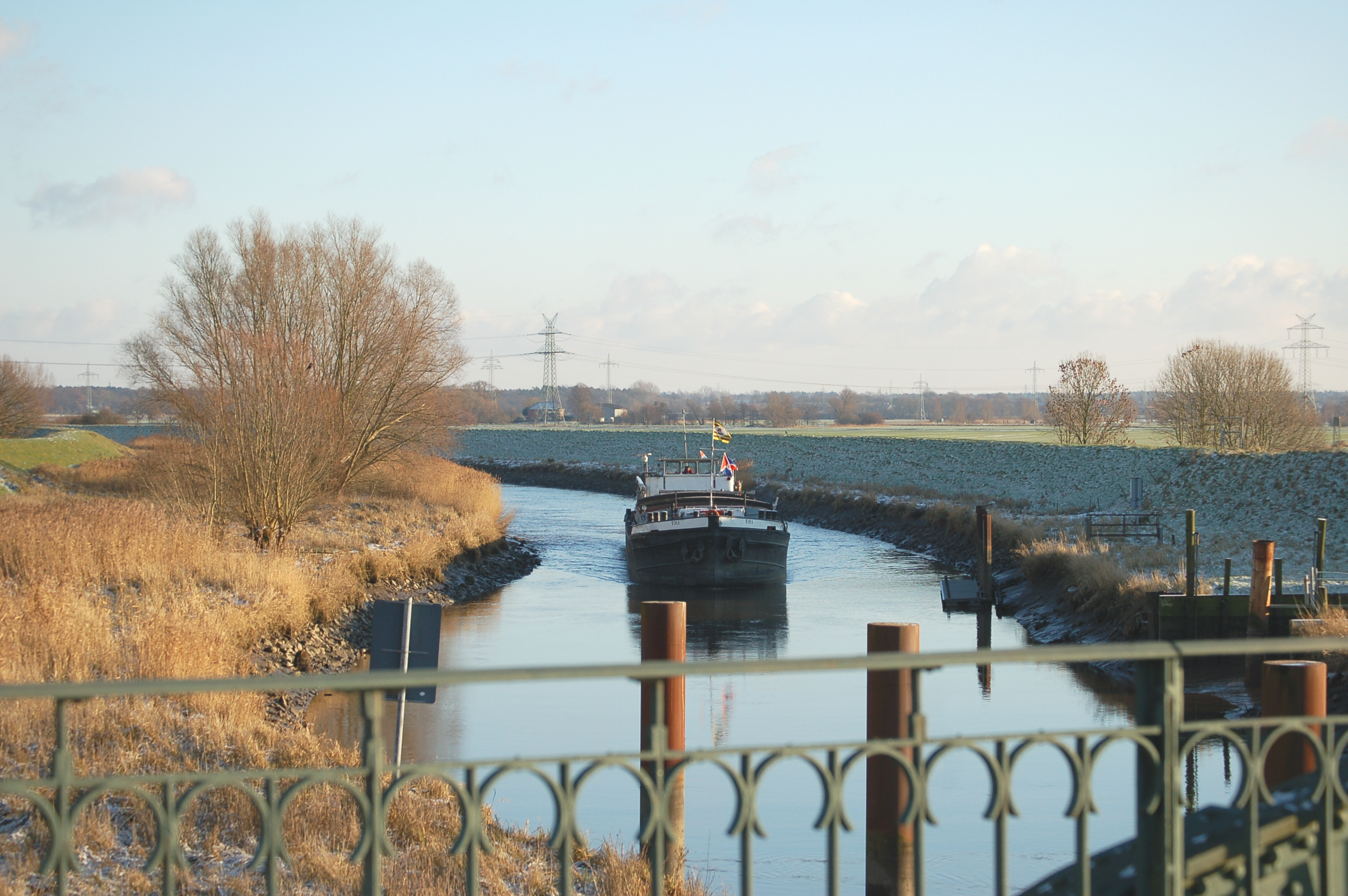

Location
- Country: Germany
- State: Schleswig-Holstein

Physical characteristics
- Mouth: Elbe
  - coordinates: 53°40′34″N 9°32′44″E

Basin features
- Progression: Elbe→ North Sea

The Pinnau is a 41-kilometre-long (25 mi) river, which flows right or northeast of the main river, Elbe. The Pinnau is therefore a tributary in the southern part of Schleswig-Holstein, Germany.

The Pinnau is categorized by German Bund/Länder-Arbeitsgemeinschaft Wasser (Federal/state association water) by "flow type" as a "marshland water body". The 8.5 km (5.3 mi) lower part between the Elbe and Uetersen is navigable for Class II ships, the 10.3 km (6.4 mi) middle part between Uetersen and Pinneberg is navigable but not classified.

== Route ==
The Pinnau has its source in the town of Henstedt-Ulzburg, then flows southwest, in Pinneberg to the west and ends in the municipality of Haselau in the Elbe, which streams in northwestern direction.

=== Hydrology ===
The Pinnau is very much tide dependent and strongly influenced by tidal range.

=== Tributary rivers ===
- Krambek, first tributary river of the Pinnau
- Bilsener Bek, second tributary from the right side
- Ebach, flows from left side into the river in the town of Ellerau
- Gronau, flows from left side into the river between Ellerau and Quickborn
- Riedbach, flows into the river from the right in Pinneberg
- Mühlenau, flows in from left side in Pinneberg
- Appener Au (Beek), flows in from left side in Appen
- Bilsbek, flows into the river from the right between Prisdorf and Tornesch
- Ohrtbrookgraben, flows into the river from the right between Tornesch und Uetersen

== History ==
The Pinnau was called in earlier times Ütristina or in later times Aue to Ueterst.

=== Federal Water Street ===
The Pinnau is a federal waterway within the remit of the Wasserstraßen- und Schifffahrtsamt Hamburg (Waterways and Shipping Office Hamburg) from the south-western edge of the railway bridge in Pinneberg to the mouth of the Pagensander Nebenelbe with 18.81 km (11.69 mi), at Elbe-km 658.99. It is one of the inland waterways, on which the German Seeschifffahrtsstraßen-Ordnung (Maritime Traffic Regulations) applies.

== See also ==
- List of rivers of Schleswig-Holstein
