= Groß Flottbek =

Quarter in the borough of Altona

- Quarter of Hamburg
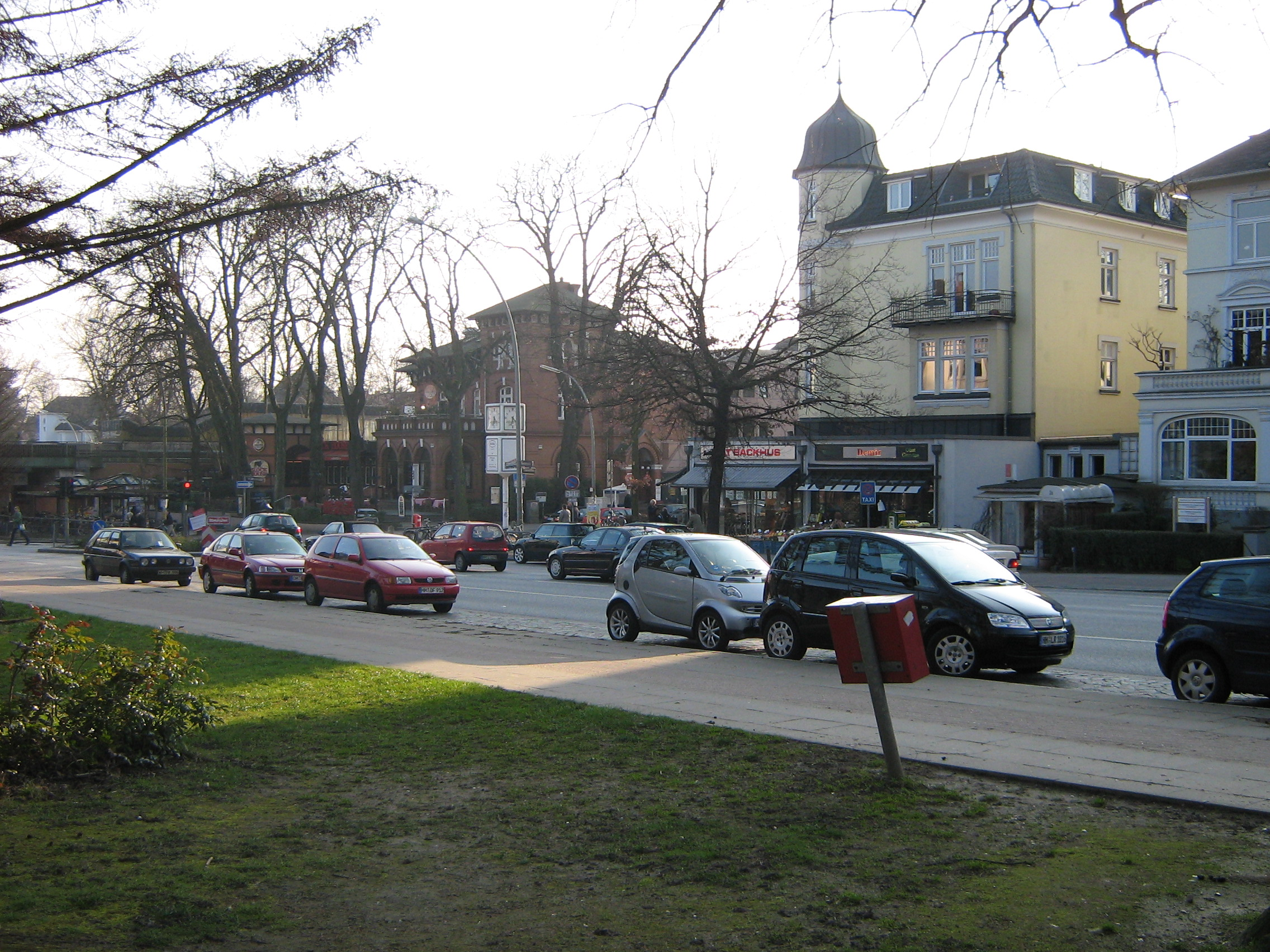

- Location of Groß Flottbek in Hamburg
- Interactive map of Groß Flottbek
- Location within Germany Location within Hamburg
- Coordinates: 53.56536°N 9.87759°E
- Country: Germany
- State: Hamburg
- City: Hamburg
- Borough: Hamburg-Altona

Area
  - Total: 2.4 km^{2} (0.93 sq mi)

Population (2024-12-31)
  - Total: 11,319
  - Density: 4,700/km^{2} (12,000/sq mi)
- Time zone: UTC+01:00 (CET)
  - Summer (DST): UTC+02:00 (CEST)
- Dialling codes: 040
- Vehicle registration: HH

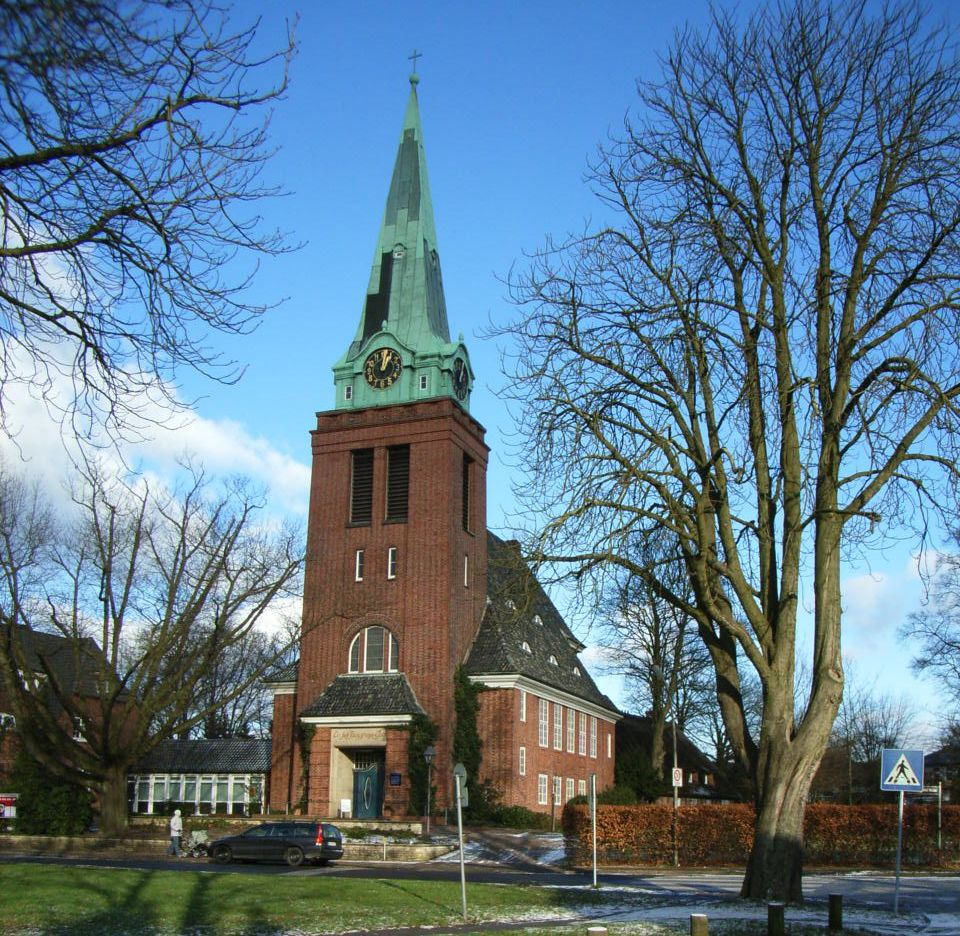
Flottbek church, built in 1912

Groß Flottbek (German pronunciation: [ɡʁoːs ˈflɔtbeːk], lit. 'Great Flottbek', in contrast to "Little Flottbek") is a quarter of Hamburg, Germany, in the borough of Altona. It is located in the center of the borough north of the Othmarschen quarter. Near Groß Flottbek, the neighbourhood of Klein Flottbek, which is not an official quarter, can be found. Around 11.000 people live in Groß Flottbek on 2.4 sq km.

== Geography ==
Groß Flottbek borders the quarters of Bahrenfeld, Othmarschen, Nienstedten and Osdorf. The Flottbek stream flows through Groß Flottbek and into River Elbe near Teufelsbrück.

== History ==
Groß Flottbek was first recorded in 1305. Between 1640 and 1866, Flottbek was part of Denmark. Along with Altona, of which it was a part since 1927, Groß Flottbek became a part of Hamburg in 1937/1938 through the Greater Hamburg Act. Today, the quarter is dominated by residential areas and mansions.

== Politics ==
These are the results of Groß Flottbek in the Hamburg state election:

	SPD	Greens	CDU	FDP	Left	AfD	Others
2020	35,2 %	27,7 %	13,7 %	10,3 %	5,7 %	2,7 %	4,7 %
2015	40,0 %	13,7 %	18,2 %	16,5 %	5,0 %	4,4 %	2,2 %
2011	42,4 %	11,8 %	25,0 %	13,6 %	3,3 %	–	3,9 %
2008	25,4 %	11,1 %	51,3 %	7,7 %	3,0 %	–	1,4 %
2004	21,7 %	14,9 %	55,8 %	4,1 %	–	–	3,5 %
2001	28,0 %	12,3 %	33,5 %	11,9 %	0,2 %	–	14,1 %
1997	23,7 %	16,2 %	40,1 %	7,4 %	0,3 %	–	12,3 %
1993	26,1 %	15,7 %	34,7 %	8,5 %	–	–	15,0 %
1991	30,4 %	8,3 %	46,9 %	11,8 %	0,2 %	–	2,4 %
1987	30,9 %	6,7 %	48,1 %	13,8 %	–	–	0,5 %
1986	25,0 %	10,0 %	52,4 %	12,1 %	–	–	0,5 %
Dec. 1982	30,1 %	7,3 %	55,1 %	7,1 %	–	–	0,4 %
Jun. 1982	24,3 %	8,1 %	58,3 %	7,8 %	–	–	1,5 %
1978	27,4 %	4,7 %	56,7 %	8,5 %	–	–	2,7 %
1974	22,0 %	–	60,6 %	14,3 %	–	–	3,1 %
1970	32,3 %	–	50,1 %	13,6 %	–	–	4,0 %
1966	34,7 %	–	47,9 %	11,9 %	–	–	5,5 %
