= Bekdorf =

- Municipality
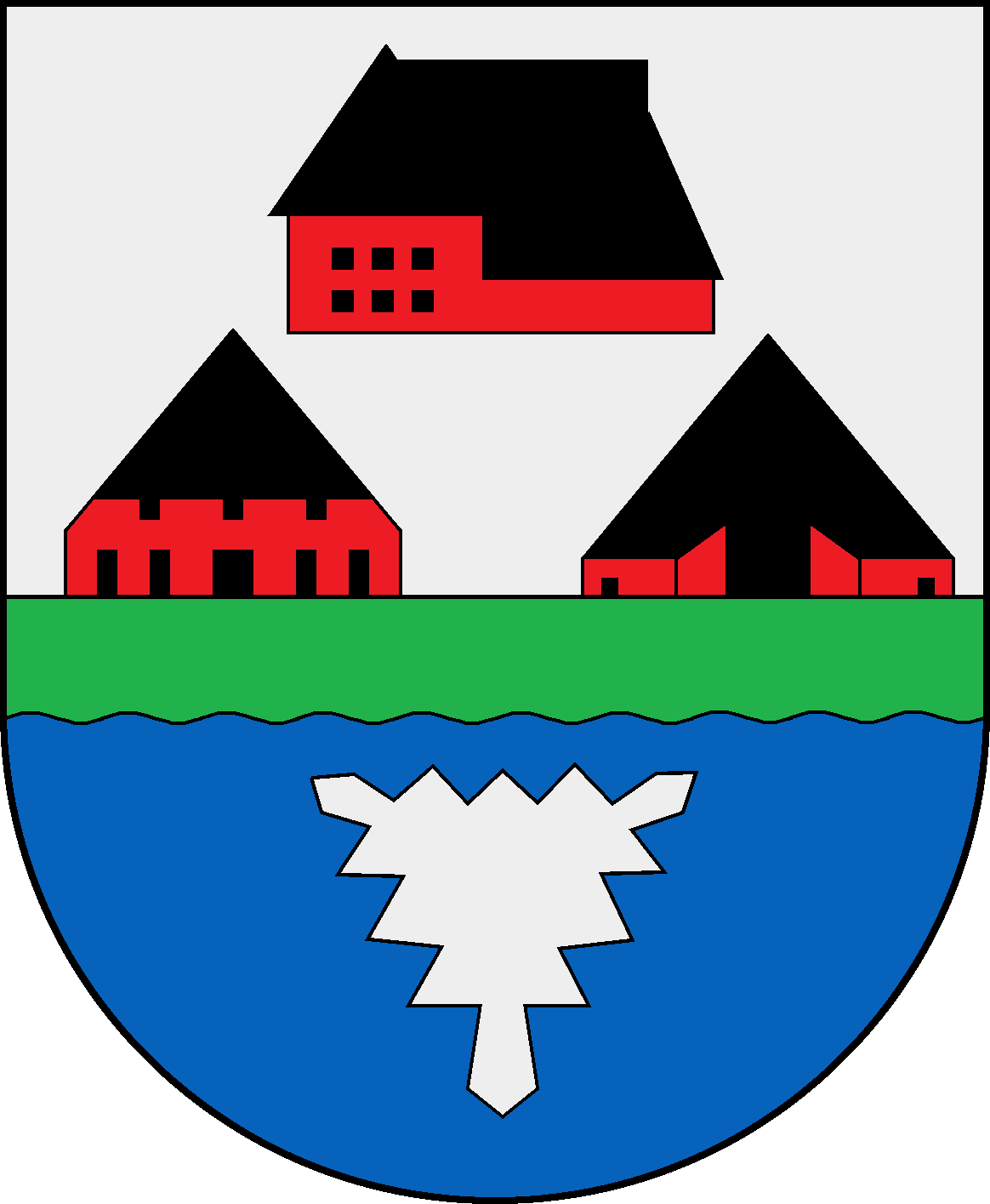
- Coat of arms

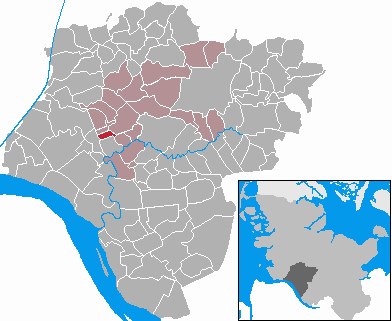
- Location of Bekdorf within Steinburg district
- Interactive map of Bekdorf
- Location within Germany Location within Schleswig-Holstein
- Coordinates: 53°55′N 9°25′E
- Country: Germany
- State: Schleswig-Holstein
- District: Steinburg
- Municipal assoc.: Itzehoe-Land

Government
  - Mayor: Matthias Kelting

Area
  - Total: 1.7 km^{2} (0.66 sq mi)
- Elevation: 4 m (13 ft)

Population (2025-12-31)
  - Total: 87
  - Density: 51/km^{2} (130/sq mi)
- Time zone: UTC+01:00 (CET)
  - Summer (DST): UTC+02:00 (CEST)
- Postal codes: 25554
- Dialling codes: 04823
- Vehicle registration: IZ
- Website: www.amtitzehoe-land.de

Bekdorf is a municipality in the district of Steinburg, in Schleswig-Holstein, Germany. It is located next to the Bekau River. Bekdorf can is pronounced as "bɛkˌdɔrf".
