= Osdorf, Hamburg =

Osdorf
- Quarter of Hamburg
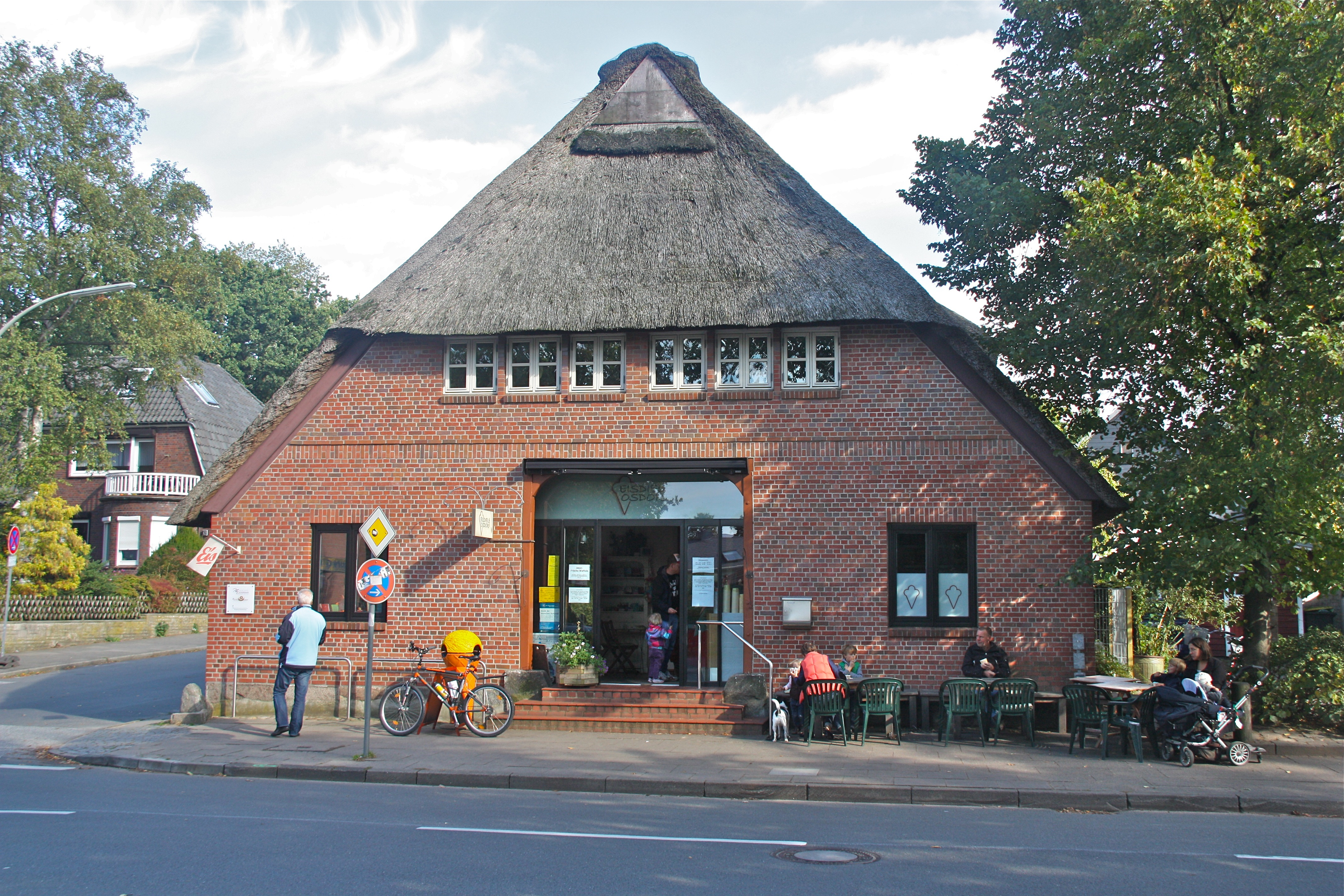
- Thatched-roofed house in the center of the old Osdorf village

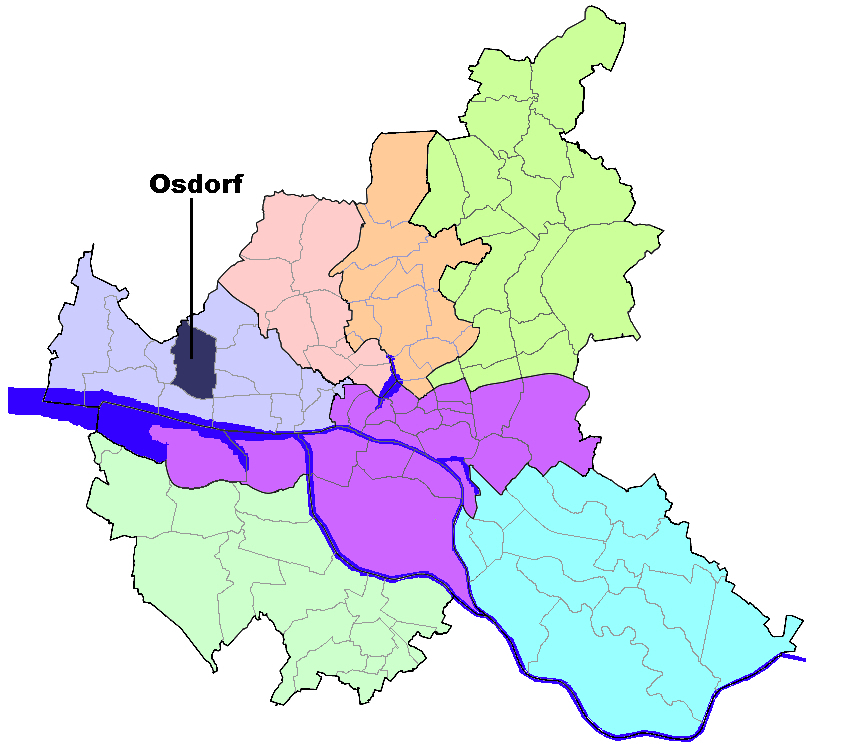
- Location of Osdorf in the city of Hamburg
- Interactive map of Osdorf
- Location within Germany Location within Hamburg
- Coordinates: 53°34′20″N 9°50′35″E
- Country: Germany
- State: Hamburg
- City: Hamburg
- Borough: Altona

Area
  - Total: 7.3 km^{2} (2.8 sq mi)

Population (2024-12-31)
  - Total: 26,601
  - Density: 3,600/km^{2} (9,400/sq mi)
- Time zone: UTC+01:00 (CET)
  - Summer (DST): UTC+02:00 (CEST)
- Dialling codes: 040
- Vehicle registration: HH

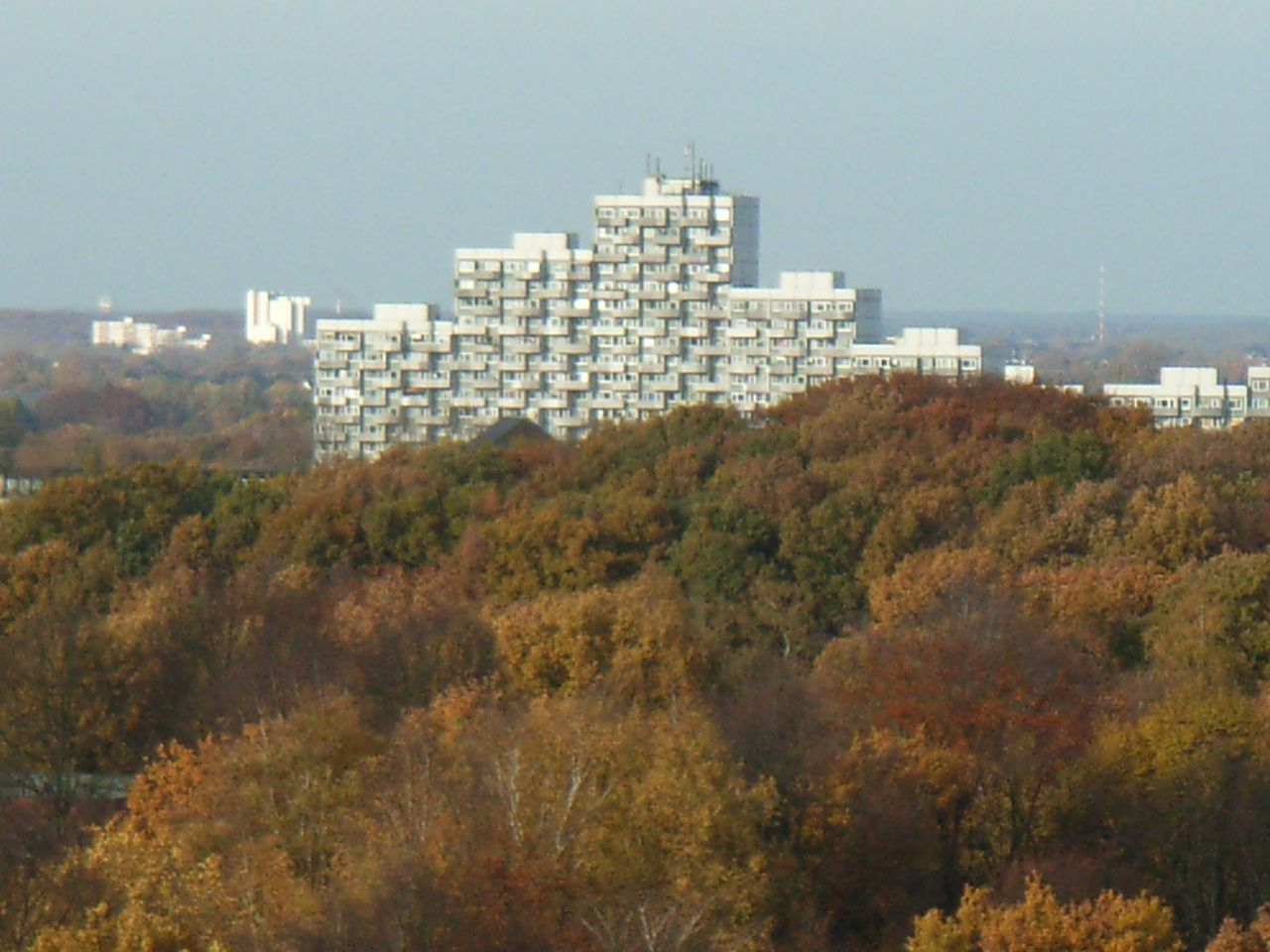
Major estate of Osdorfer Born.

Osdorf (German pronunciation: [ˈɔsdɔrf]) is a quarter in the city of Hamburg, Germany. It belongs to the Altona borough. In 2023 the population was 26,370.

== History ==
In 1927 the former independent settlement Osdorf was made a part of the town Altona; in 1938 it was merged into the Hanseatic city of Hamburg with the Greater Hamburg Act.

After World War II, from 1950 to 1952, first new residential buildings were constructed near the streets of Blomkamp and Am Landpflegeheim. A major estate of prefabricated houses with 5,000 flats for 12,000 people, Osdorfer Born settlement, had been planned since 1963 and was erected from 1966 to 1971.

== Geography ==
In 2006, according to the statistical office of Hamburg and Schleswig-Holstein, Osdorf had a total area of 7.3 km^{2}. The southern boundaries of Osdorf to the quarter Nienstedten lead along the railway tracks of the city train. In the west, the town of Schenefeld in Schleswig-Holstein and the quarter Iserbrook are located. To the east are the quarters Lurup, Bahrenfeld, and Groß Flottbek. Lake Helmuth Schack, located in the former moor area Deesmoor, lies in the quarter. The stream of Düpenau runs through the lake, Luruper Moorgraben flows into it.

== Demographics ==
In 2006, Osdorf had a population of 25,206. The population density was 3,459 inhabitants per square kilometre (8,960/sq mi). 18% were children under the age of 18, and 23.7% were 65 years of age or older. 13.4% were immigrants. 1,408 people were registered as unemployed and 6,651 were employees subject to social insurance contributions.

In 1999 there were 12,148 households, out of which 23.3% had children under the age of 18 living with them and 39.2% of all households were made up of individuals. The average household size was 2.12.

=== Population by year ===
The population is counted by the residential registration office for the December 31 each year.

1987	1988	1989
23,347	25,918	25,974

1990	1991	1992	1993	1994	1995	1996	1997	1998	1999
26,410	26,858	26,739	26,993	26,625	26,332	26,084	25,599	25,601	25,487

2000	2001	2002	2003	2004	2005	2006	2007	2008	2014
25,477	25,675	25,909	25,993	25,417	25,297	25,106	25,204	25,070	25,901

In 2006 there were 2,402 criminal offences (96 crimes per 1000 people).

== Education ==
There were 4 elementary schools and 4 secondary schools in the quarter Osdorf, the Lise-Meitner-Gymnasium among the latter.

A part of the Führungsakademie der Bundeswehr is located in the barracks Generalleutnant–Graf–von–Baudissin–Kaserne. The academy of the Bundeswehr educates officers for leading positions.

== Culture ==
=== Recreation ===
The recreational area Bornpark is located at the border to Schleswig-Holstein. The Loki-Schmidt-Garten, also called Neuer Botanischer Garten (New Botanical Garden) is located in the area of the former independent municipality Klein Flottbek.

== Infrastructure ==
=== Health systems ===
In Osdorf were 17 day-care centers for children, 48 physicians in private practice and 6 pharmacies.

=== Transportation ===
Osdorf is serviced by the rapid transit system of the city train lines S1 and S11 with the stations Hochkamp and Klein Flottbek.

According to the Department of Motor Vehicles (Kraftfahrt-Bundesamt), in the quarter Osdorf were 9,445 private cars registered (474 cars/1000 people). There were 123 traffic accidents total, including 106 traffic accidents with damage to persons.

== Notes ==
=== References ===
- Statistical office Hamburg and Schleswig-Holstein Statistisches Amt für Hamburg und Schleswig-Holstein, official website (in German)
- Osdorf, Hamburg.de
