= Bilsener Bek =

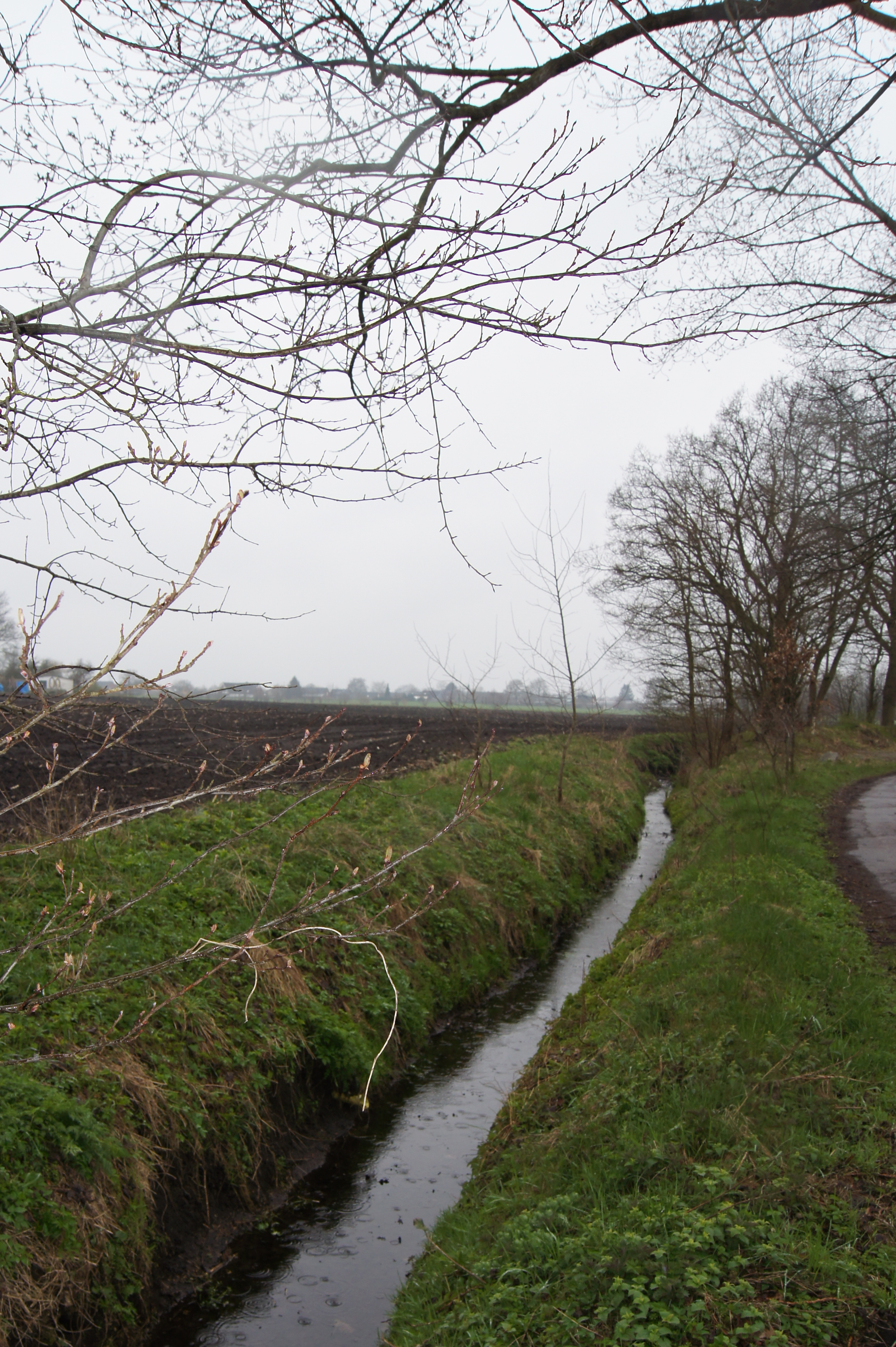
- Bilsener Bek at the border between Bilsen and Alvesloh

Location
- Country: Germany
- State: Schleswig-Holstein

Physical characteristics
- Source
  - location: Bilsen
- Mouth
  - location: Pinnau
  - coordinates: 53.7725°N 9.9003°E

Basin features
- Progression: Pinnau→ Elbe→ North Sea

Bilsener Bek (in Low German Bilsener Beek) is a small river of Schleswig-Holstein, Germany. It flows into the Pinnau near Bilsen.

== See also ==
- List of rivers of Schleswig-Holstein
