= Hermann Heinrich Becker (painter) =

German painter and writer (1817–1885)

Hermann Becker
- Born: 24 September 1817; Free City of Hamburg
- Died: 13 May 1885 (aged 67); Aachen, Kingdom of Prussia, German Empire
- Occupations: painter and art historian

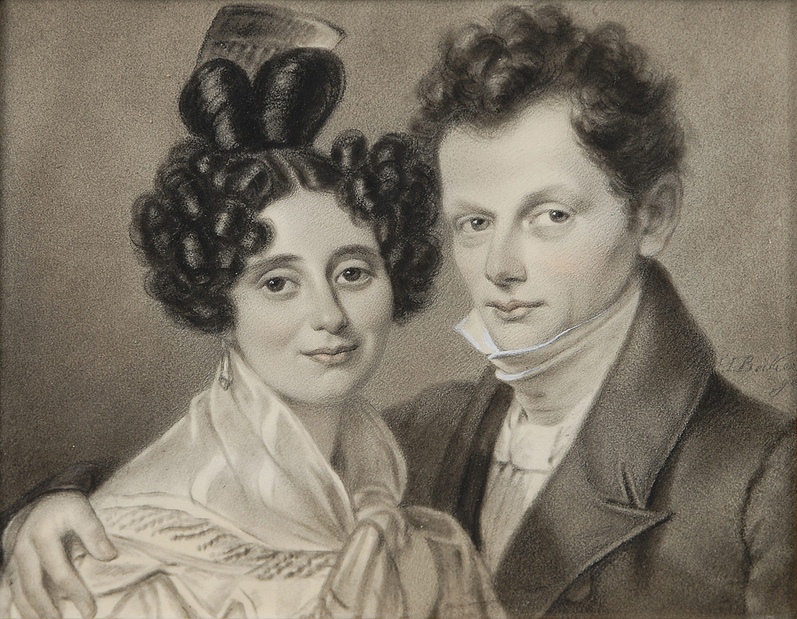
Biedermeier Couple by Hermann Becker

Hermann Heinrich Becker (1817–1885) was a German painter, art historian, and writer.

== Life and work ==
Becker was born 24 September 1817 in Hamburg, the son to Hamburg merchant and broker Hermann Becker (died 1838). From 1839 to 1844 he studied at the Düsseldorf Academy of Arts, under Karl Ferdinand Sohn, Carl Gottfried Eybe, and Christoph Wilhelm Wohlien, afterwards going on study trips to Antwerp, Paris, Brussels and Italy. In 1844 he settled in Düsseldorf as a painter and worked on history and genre subjects.

In 1844 Becker was a founding member of the Verein Düsseldorfer Künstler zu gegenseitiger Unterstützung und Hülfe (Association of Düsseldorf Artists for Mutual Support and Assistance), and in 1848 a founder of the Malkasten artists' association. He was also a member of the Hamburger Künstler-Verein (Hamburg Artists' Association), and an 1856 founder of the Allgemeine Deutsche Kunstgenossenschaft (German General Art Cooperative) at Bingen am Rhein.

In 1866 he lived in Cologne, where he became an art critic. The Historical Archive of the City of Cologne contains his unpublished manuscript for a comedy play Hermann der Cherusker.

Becker's painting was associated with the Nazarene movement. His work included religious motifs, mythological, historical and genre themes, and portraits.

Becker died 3 May 1885 at Aachen. His son was also named Hermann.

== Publications ==
- Deutsche Maler. Von Asmus Jakob Carstens an bis auf die neuere Zeit kritisch geschildert. Edited and published by his son Hermann Becker, Verlag Reissner, Leipzig 1888, urn:urn:nbn:de:hbz:061:1-40748:{{{2}}}.
- Das Dortmunder Wandschneider-Buch. Crüwell, Dortmund 1871, (urn:urn:nbn:de:hbz:061:1-85140:{{{2}}}).
- Becker, Hermann; in Hans Wolfgang Singer (Hrsg.): Allgemeines Künstler-Lexicon. Leben und Werke der berühmtesten bildenden Künstler, Vorbereitet von Hermann Alexander Müller. 3., umgearbeitete und bis auf die neueste Zeit ergänzte Auflage. Vol 1: A–F. Literarische Anstalt, Rütten & Loening, Frankfurt a. M. 1895, p. 89
- Becker, Hermann; in Ulrich Thieme, Felix Becker (Hrsg.): Allgemeines Lexikon der Bildenden Künstler von der Antike bis zur Gegenwart, Begründet von Ulrich Thieme und Felix Becker, Vol 3: Bassano–Bickham. Wilhelm Engelmann, Leipzig 1909, p. 148
- Bénézit, Emmanuel; Dictionnaire critique et documentaire des peintres, sculpteurs, dessinateurs…. 1976, p. 564.
- Becker, Hermann Heinrich; in Allgemeines Künstlerlexikon. Die Bildenden Künstler aller Zeiten und Völker (AKL). Vol 8, Saur, München u. a. 1993, p. 164. ISBN 3-598-22748-5
- Sent, Eleonore; Nachlässe und Sammlungen im Stadtarchiv der Landeshauptstadt Düsseldorf, 4–2 Hermann Heinrich Becker. Düsseldorf 2006 (duesseldorf.de PDF; 248 kB; ausführliche Biografie, p. 4).
