= Düpenau =

River in Germany

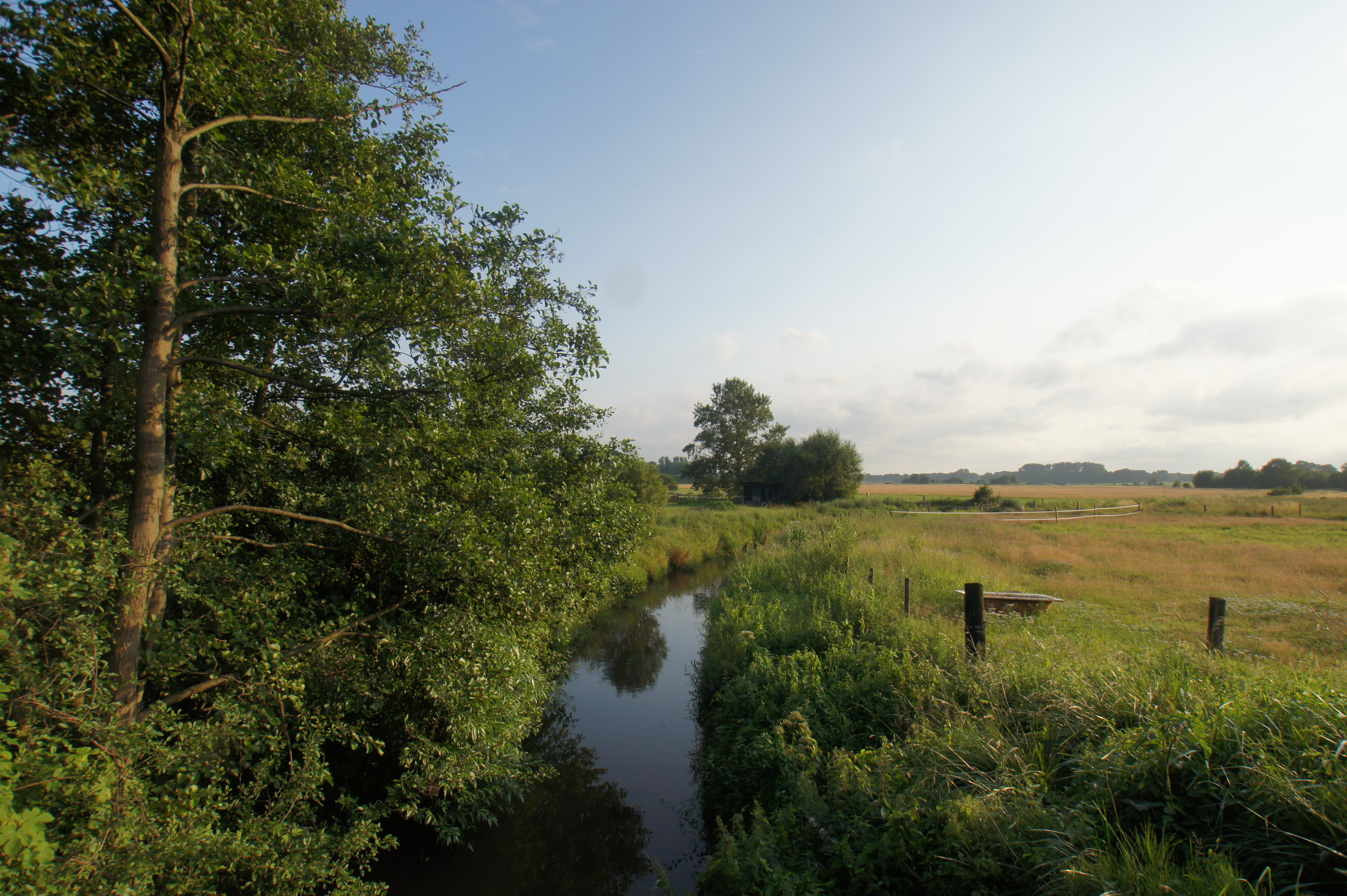

Location
- Country: Germany
- States: Hamburg and Schleswig-Holstein

Physical characteristics
- Mouth
  - location: Mühlenau
  - coordinates: 53.6473°N 9.8285°E

Basin features
- Progression: Mühlenau→ Pinnau→ Elbe→ North Sea

Düpenau is a river of Hamburg and Schleswig-Holstein, Germany. In Osdorf, Hamburg it flows through Lake Helmuth Schack. It is a tributary of the Mühlenau near Pinneberg.

== See also ==
- List of rivers of Hamburg
- List of rivers of Schleswig-Holstein
