= Carl Gottfried Eybe =

German painter (1813–1893)

- Born: 17 December 1813; Hamburg
- Died: 17 February 1893 (aged 79); Blankenese
- Occupations: painter, lithographer and sculptor

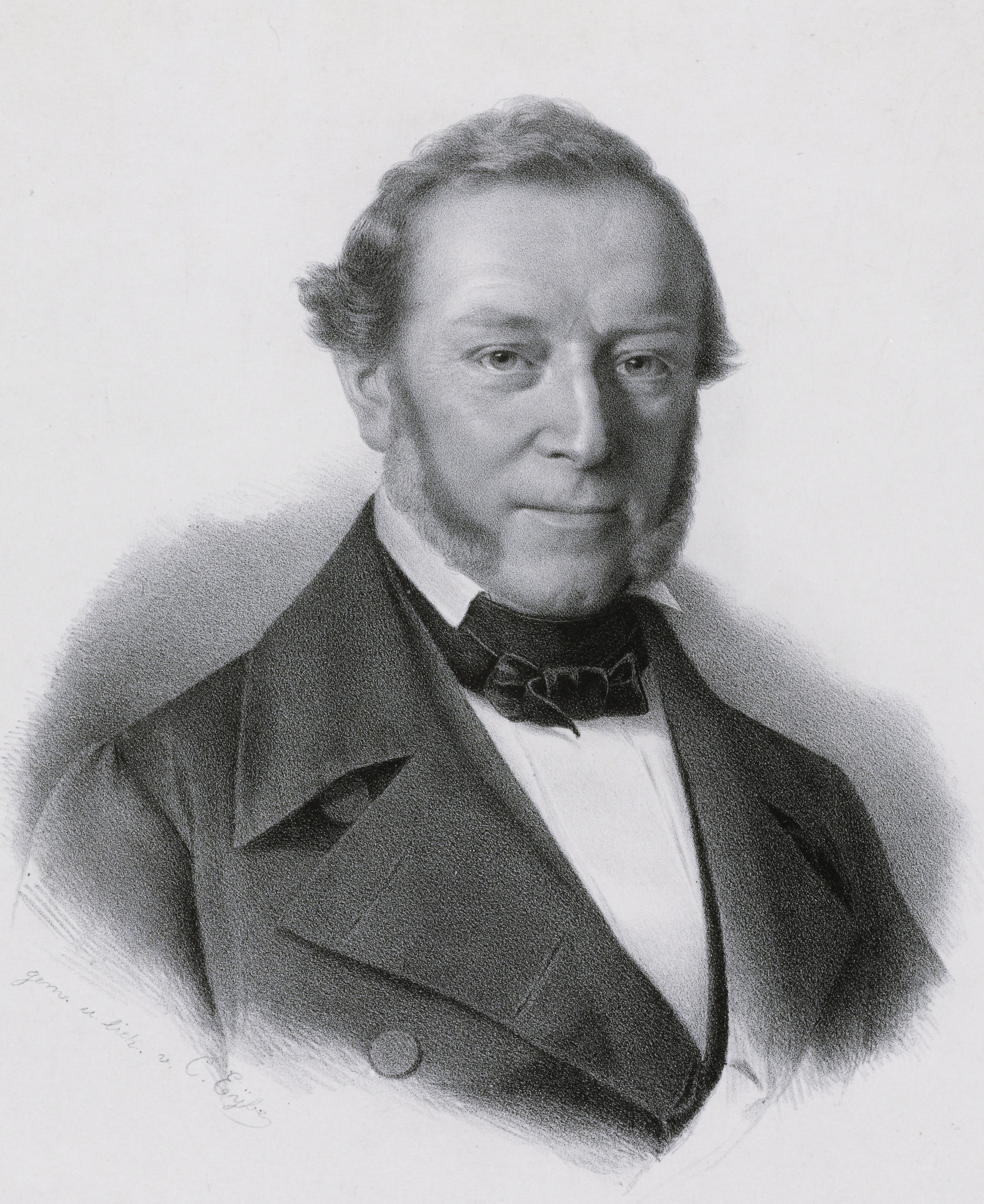
Portrait lithograph of J.E. Bieber by Carl Gottfried Eybe

Carl Gottfried Eybe (1813–1893) was a 19th-century German painter, lithographer and sculptor.

== Life and work ==
Carl Gottfried Eybe was born 17 December 1813 in Hamburg, the son to Gottfried Eybe, an innkeeper of Königsberg. After completing an apprenticeship as a merchant, he was introduced to painting by Friedrich Carl Gröger and Heinrich Jacob Aldenrath, and Christoph Wilhelm Wohlien with whom he remained friends all his life. Another friend was the painter Hermann Becker.

From 1839 to 1847 Eybe studied at the Düsseldorf Royal Arts Academy under Karl Ferdinand Sohn and later, Friedrich Wilhelm von Schadow. Under Schadow's influence he produced paintings on religious themes, such as Hagar and Ishmael in the Desert (1845),[3] or Caritas (1847) which was acquired by the Hamburger Kunsthalle. After study, in 1848 he became a painter at Hamburg and earned his living for a time with sculpture and portrait lithographs. Later study trips took him through Germany, and to the Netherlands, Hungary and Northern Italy. He joined the Verein Düsseldorfer Künstler zu gegenseitiger Unterstützung und Hülfe (Association of Düsseldorf Artists for Mutual Support and Assistance), and in 1846 became a member of the Malkasten artists' association. He was also a member of the Hamburger Künstler-Verein (Hamburg Artists' Association).

In Hamburg he turned to genre figurative themes, including depictions of children, such as in Kinder im Walde (1851) and Badende Kinder (1858), and received middle class portrait commissions. Eybe's works in exhibitions were such as those at Munich in 1854, Düsseldorf in 1880, and Hamburg in 1887. Portraits of Eybe, the pencil drawing by Christian Eduard Böttcher, and an oil by Ludwig Knaus from 1850, are kept at the Malkasten-Haus headquarters of Malkasten artists' association in Düsseldorf.

Eybe died 17 February 1893 in Blankenese.

== Selected works ==
- Susanna in the Bath (with landscape painted by Andreas Achenbach), Hamburg, Kunsthalle
- Portrait of Johann Georg Hackiusand Portrait of Barbara Hackius (1839), Hamburg, Kunsthalle
- Portrait of Louis Vohsen and Portrait of Fanny Vohsen (1844)
- Portrait of the painter Julius Bakof (1847), Hamburg, Kunsthalle
- Portrait of Peter Ludwig Ahrens and Portrait of Johanna Magdalena Ahrens (1847), Hamburg, Museum of Hamburg History
- Portrait of Hans Schierven Knoph (1850), Hamburg, Museum of Hamburg History
- Portrait of a Boy (1875), Kiel, Art Gallery
- Portrait of the Lodge Master F. C. L. Wage, previously at the Provincial Lodge, Lower Saxony

== Bibliography ==
- Hamburgisches Künstler-Lexikon, Volume 1: The visual artists. Hoffmann und Campe, Hamburg 1854, p. 68 (digital copy).
- German Painters. From Asmus Jakob Carstens to more recent times critically described in individual works, Hermann Becker (ed.) Leipzig 1888.
- Boetticher, Friedrich von; "Eybe, Carl Gottfried" in 19th century paintings. Contribution to the History of Art, Volume 2/1, sheets 1-32: Mayer, Ludwig-Rybkowski. Fr. v. Boetticher's publishing house, Dresden 1898.
- Hermann Alexander Müller, Hans Wolfgang Singer: Allgemeines Künstler-Lexicon. 1895, S. 411.
- Rump, Ernst; "Eybe, Carl Gottfried" in Lexikon der bildenden Künstler Hamburgs, Altonas und der näheren Umgebung, Otto Bröcker & Co., Hamburg 1912, p. 35
- Raspe, Theodor; "Eybe, Carl Gottfried" in Allgemeines Lexikon der Bildenden Künstler von der Antike bis zur Gegenwart, Ulrich Thieme (ed.), Ulrich Thieme and Felix Becker. Volume 11: Erman-Fiorenzo. E. A. Seemann, Leipzig 1915, pp. 124–125 (Text Archive - Internet Archive).
- Allgemeines Künstlerlexikon. Lives and works of the most famous visual artists, prepared by Hermann Alexander Müller, Hans Wolfgang Singer (ed.), Volume I. Literarische Anstalt Rütten & Loening, Frankfurt / Main 1921.
- Dictionnaire Critique et Documentaire des Peintres, Sculpteurs, Dessinateurs et Graveurs de tous les temps et de tous les pays, Volume 4, Paris 1976.
- Mayer, Enrique; Annuaire international des ventes, 1980, p. 687.
- Lexikon der Düsseldorfer Malerschule 1819-1918, Volume 1: Abbema-Gurlitt. Hans Paffrath (ed.), Kunstmuseum Düsseldorf im Ehrenhof and the Paffrath Gallery, Bruckmann, Munich 1997, pp. 336–337 (ill.). ISBN 3-7654-3009-9
- Krafft, Eva Maria; Schümann, Carl-Wolfgang Katalog der Meister des 19. Jahrhunderts in der Hamburger Kunsthalle. Hamburger Kunsthalle, Hamburg 1969, p. 58 (books.google.de excerpt).
- Hamburger Kunsthalle (ed.): Katalog der neueren Meister. Hamburg 1922, p. 252 (books.google.de excerpt).
- Hamburger Kunsthalle (ed.): Verzeichniss der Sammlung von Gemälden. Hamburg 1887, p. 59.
