= Osdorfer Born =

Estate of houses in Osdorf and Lurup, Hamburg, Germany

Coordinates: 53.5878°N 9.8506°E

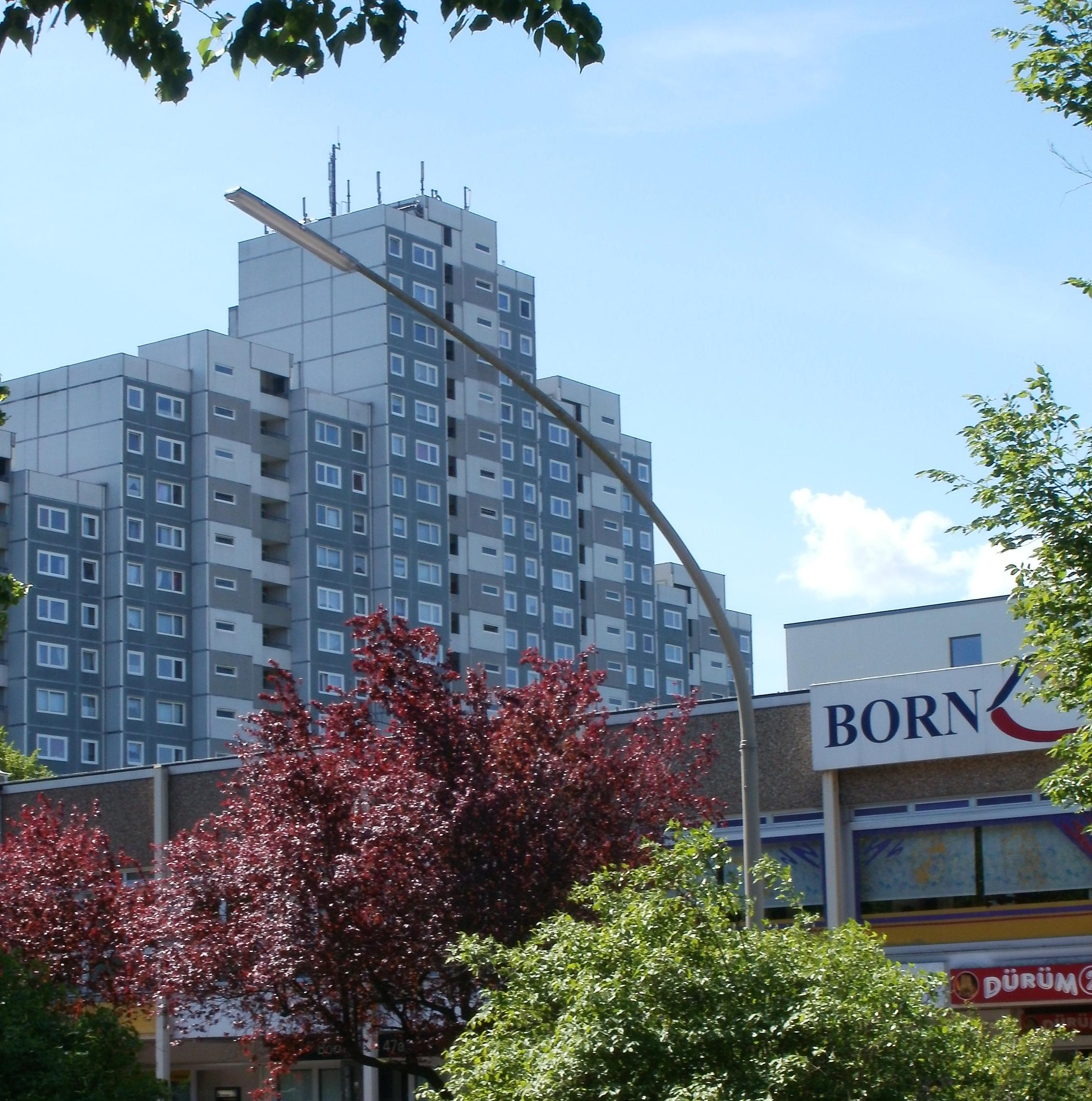
Osdorfer Born in 2011

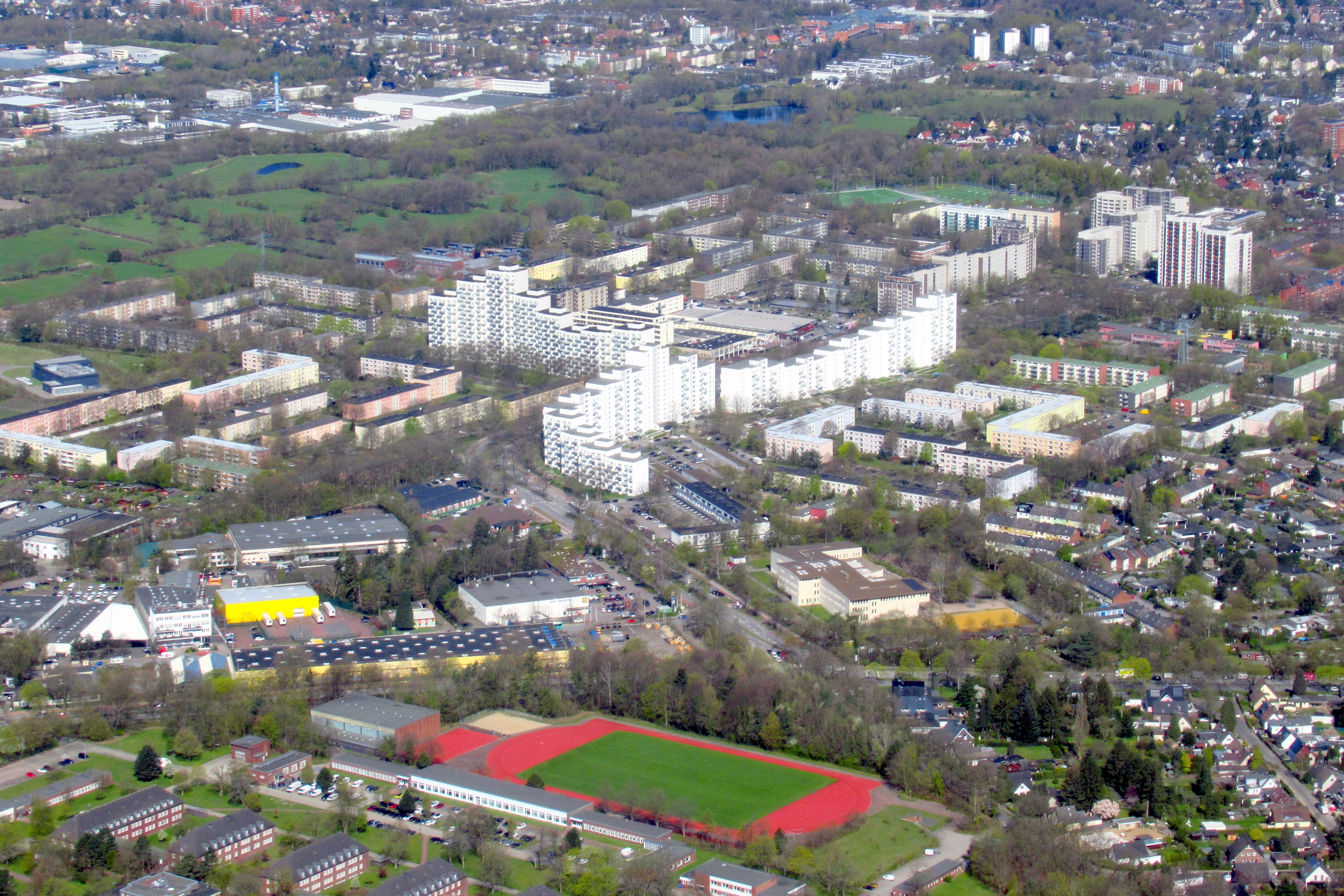
Aerial view of Osdorfer Born

Osdorfer Born is a large-scale estate of prefabricated residential buildings in the districts Osdorf and Lurup of Hamburg, Germany. It is named after a small stream flowing into the Düpenau stream.

== History ==
The residential estate with 5,000 flats for 12,000 people, including some high rises, had been planned since 1963 and was erected from 1966 to 1971. Along with Steilshoop and Mümmelmannsberg, Osdorfer Born belonged to the first large-scale housing estates ("Großsiedlungen") of the city. The 21-floor high rise at the street Achtern Born was dubbed "Affenfelsen" (lit. "Monkey Rock", because of the similarity to a constructed rock in Hagenbeck's Tierpark).

The "Born Center" shopping mall is located in the center of the housing estate. The "KL!CK Kindermuseum Hamburg", a museum for children, and the Mary Magdalene church can be found nearby. In 2002, the world's tallest graffito—measuring 43 meters in height—was recorded on a wall at Osdorfer Born.

Osdorfer Born was often described as "deprived area" or "social hotspot" (German: "sozialer Brennpunkt"). The proportion of welfare recipients and migrants is each about 20 percent, unemployment was rising during the 2000s. On the other hand, the district authorities recently adopted several measures to improve the quality of living and the social environment.

== Notable persons ==
- André Trulsen, football player
- LX, rap artist
