= Altona, Hamburg =

Altona
- Borough of Hamburg
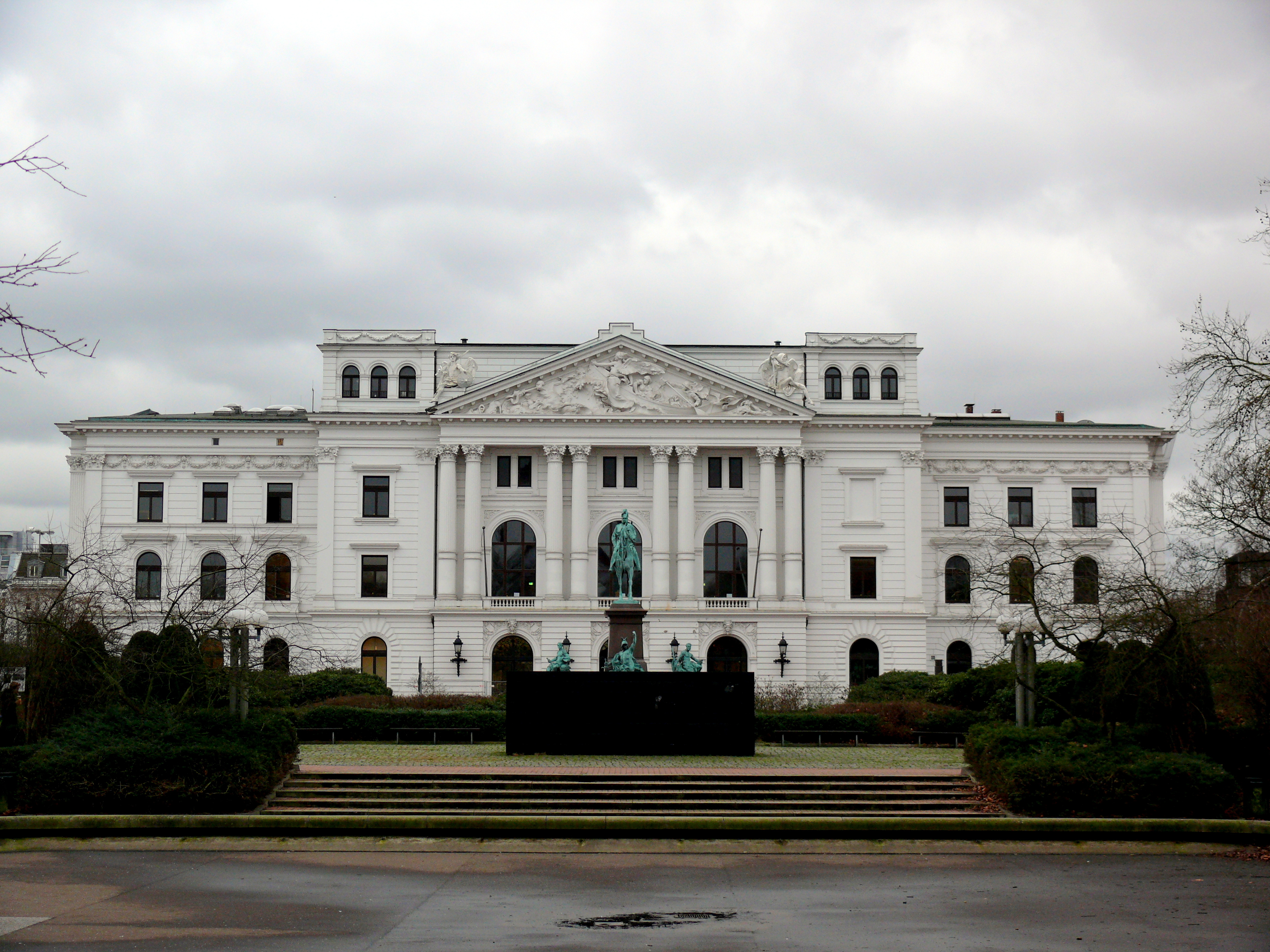
- Altona Townhall (Altona-Altstadt) behind “Black Form Dedicated to the Missing Jews” by Sol LeWitt

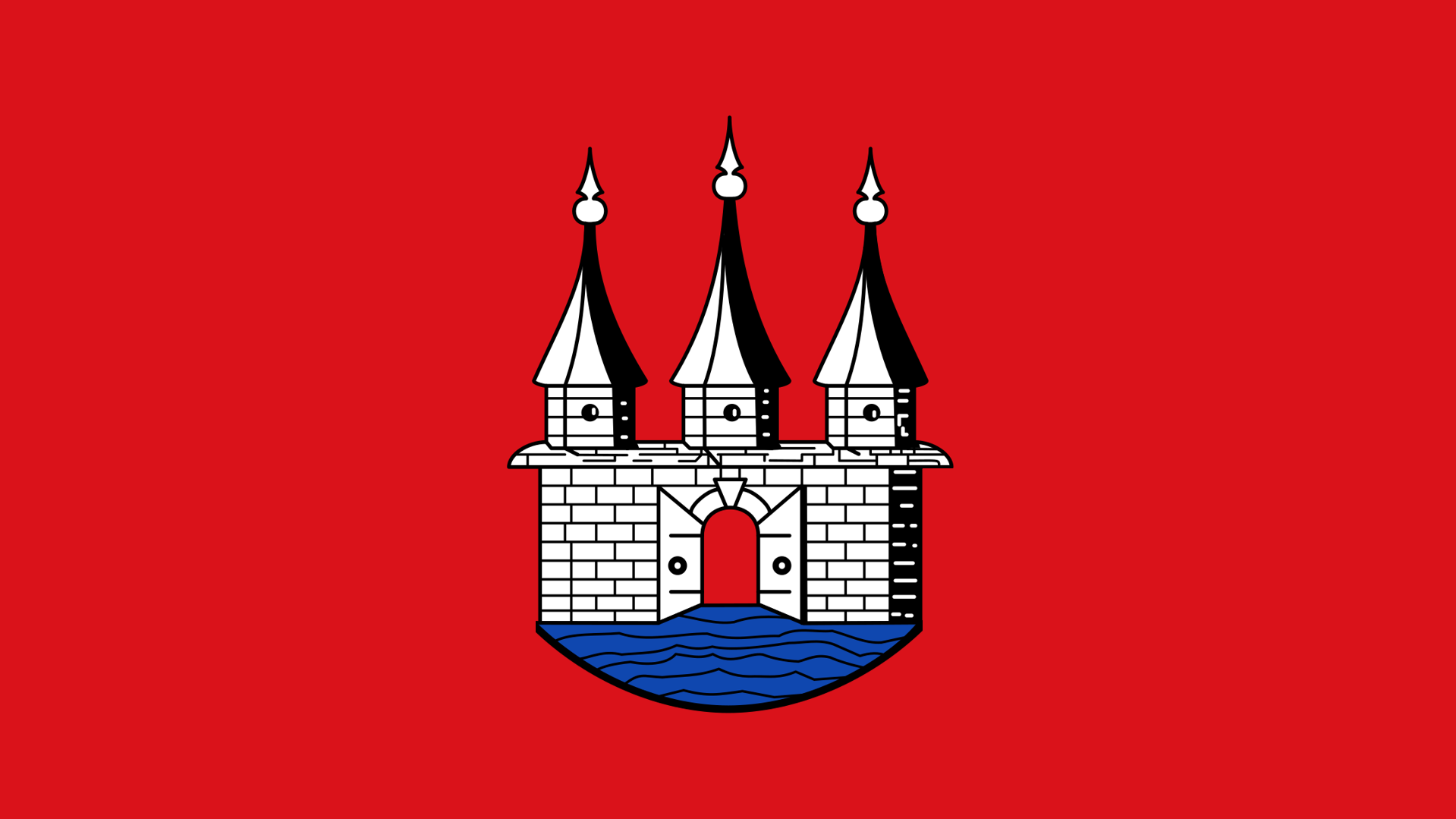
- Flag Coat of arms

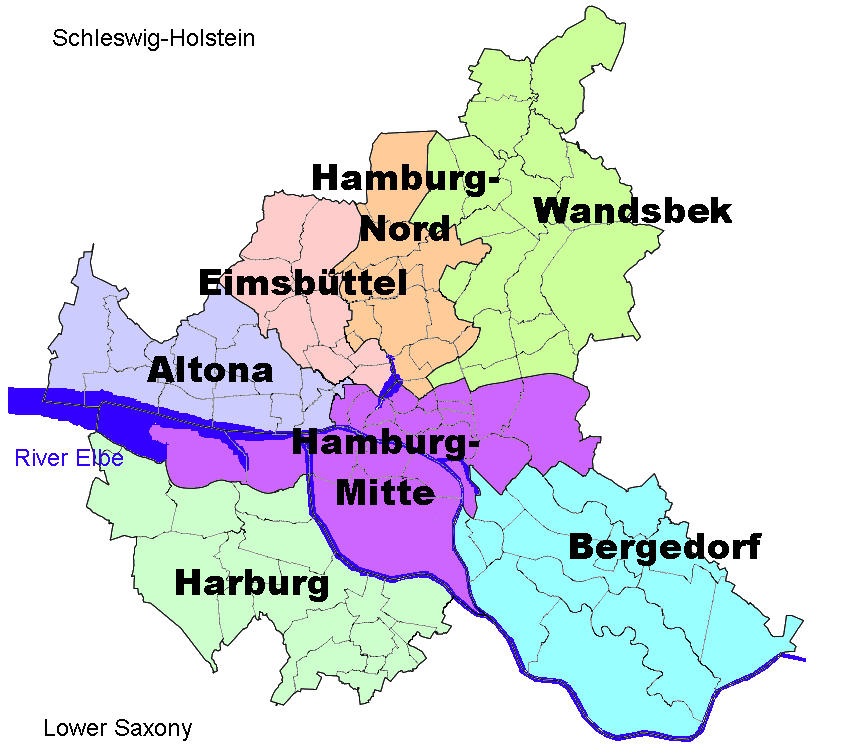
- Boroughs of Hamburg
- Interactive map of Altona
- Location within Germany Location within Hamburg
- Coordinates: 53°33′N 9°56′E
- Country: Germany
- State: Hamburg
- City: Hamburg
- Borough: Altona
- Founded: 1535
- Subdivisions: 13 quarters

Government
  - Mayor: Stefanie von Berg

Area
  - Total: 77.5 km^{2} (29.9 sq mi)

Population (2024-12-31)
  - Total: 281,136
  - Density: 3,630/km^{2} (9,400/sq mi)
- Time zone: UTC+01:00 (CET)
  - Summer (DST): UTC+02:00 (CEST)
- Dialling codes: 040
- Vehicle registration: HH

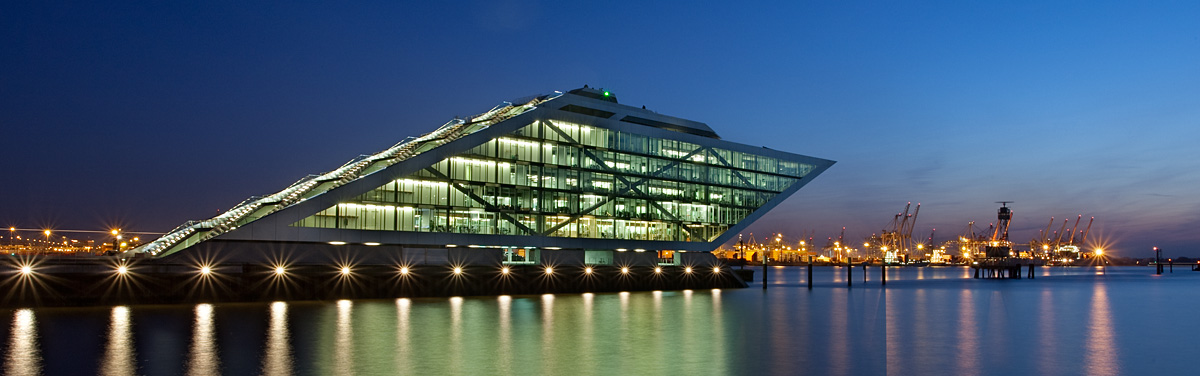
The Dockland at the harbor

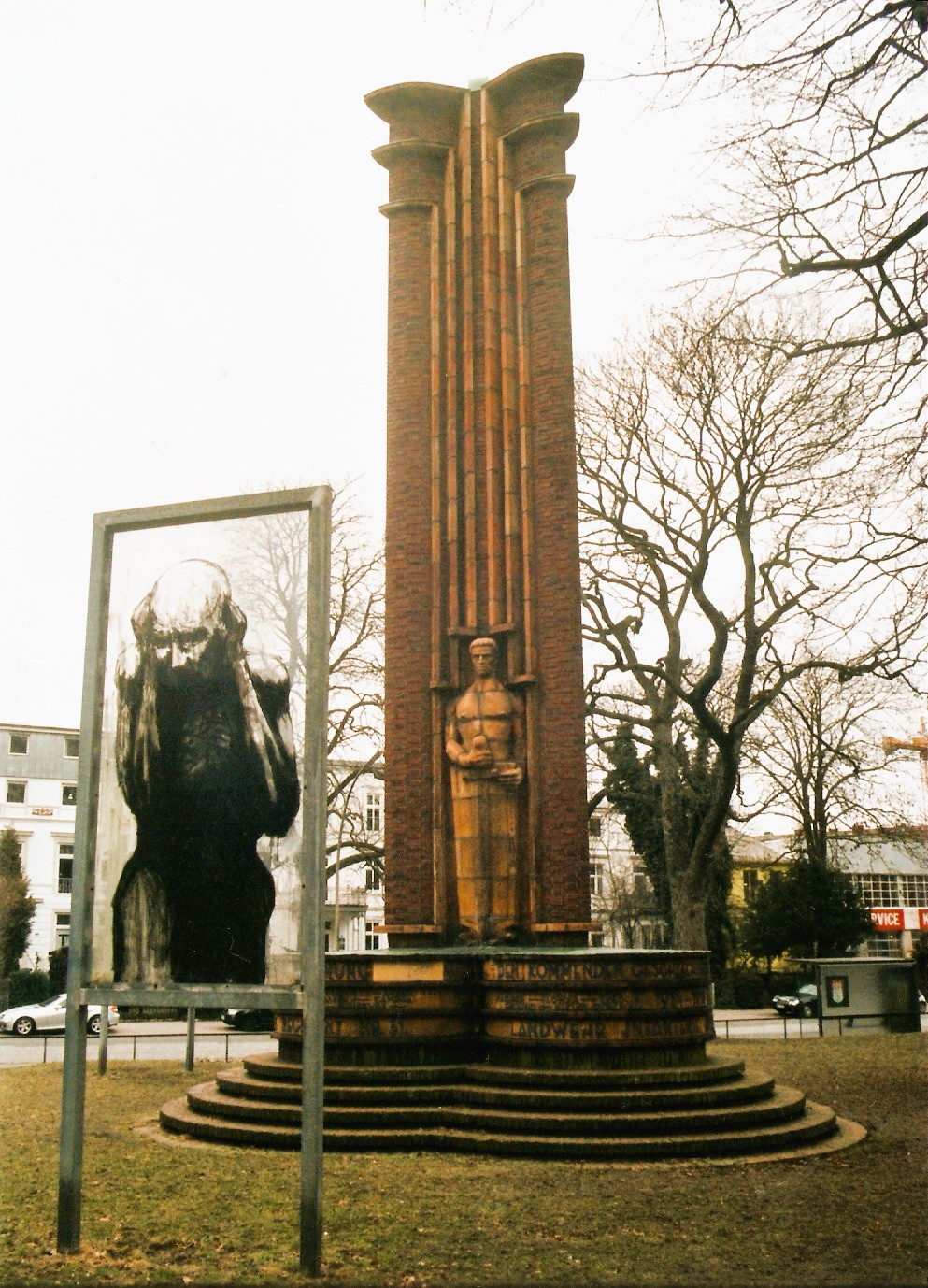
Memorial of the Prussian Regiments (IR31, RIR31 and L31)

Altona (German: [ˈaltonaː]), also called Hamburg-Altona, is the westernmost urban borough (Bezirk) of the German city state of Hamburg. Located on the right bank of the Elbe river, Altona had a population of 270,263 in 2016.

From 1640 to 1864, Altona was under the administration of the Danish monarchy. Altona was an independent borough until 1937.

== History ==
=== First mention in medieval times ===
The first documented mention of Altona was in 1537 as a tavern "Lohekrug" for the fishermen. For the competing Hamburg innkeepers, the Lohekrug was "all to na" (all too near) to the border with Hamburg, from which the name Altona may have been derived. Altona grew up around the inn as a settlement of fishermen and craftsmen, which was promoted by the rulers of the land, the Counts of Holstein-Pinneberg, in the spirit of mercantilism. In 1640, Altona was part of Holstein-Glückstadt, and in 1664 the place was granted municipal rights by the king Frederik III of Denmark, who then ruled in personal union as Duke of Holstein in the Holy Roman Empire. Altona was one of his monarchy's most important harbor towns. The railway from Altona to Kiel, the Hamburg-Altona–Kiel railway (Danish: Christian VIII Østersø Jernbane), was opened in 1844.

=== Imperial period ===
The wars between Denmark and the German Confederation – the First Schleswig War (1848–1851) and the Second Schleswig War (February–October 1864) led to Denmark's cession of the Duchies of Schleswig, Holstein and Lauenburg; they were initially jointly administered as a condominium by Prussian and Austrian administration. With the Gastein Convention of 14 August 1865, Holstein came under solely Austrian administration, while Schleswig and Lauenburg came under Prussian authority. After the Austro-Prussian War, Schleswig-Holstein as a whole became the Prussian province of Schleswig-Holstein in 1867 and as such Altona became part of the German Empire in 1871. In the same year, the town was hit by cholera, with a minimum of 16 casualties in Altona.

Because of severe restrictions on the number of Jews allowed to live in Hamburg until 1864 (with the exception of 1811–1815), a major Jewish community developed in Altona starting in 1611, when Count Ernest of Schaumburg and Holstein-Pinneberg granted the first permanent residence permits to Ashkenazic Jews. Members did business both in Hamburg and in Altona itself. All that remains after the Nazi Holocaust during World War II are the Jewish cemeteries, but in the 17th, 18th, and 19th centuries, the community was a major center of Jewish life and scholarship. Holstein-Pinneberg, and later Danish Holstein, imposed lower taxes and fewer civil restrictions on their Jewish communities than the government of Hamburg.

=== History from 1918 to 1945 ===
During the Weimar era following World War I, the town of Altona experienced significant labor strikes and street unrest amid widespread economic instability. Inflation in Germany was a major issue, and in 1923, Altona's mayor, Max Brauer, addressed the problem by partially paying town personnel with gas meter tokens, which retained their value despite the inflation.

The most notable event at that time was the Altona Bloody Sunday (German: Altonaer Blutsonntag) on 17 July 1932, when 18 people were killed, all but two by police, during a violent clash between Nazi marchers and members or supporters of the Communist Party. After police raids and a special court, on 1 August 1933, Bruno Tesch and others were found guilty and put to death by beheading with a hand-held axe. In 1938, the Greater Hamburg Act removed Altona from the Free State of Prussia in 1937 and merged it (and several surrounding towns) with the Free and Hanseatic City of Hamburg.

=== Modern history ===
In the 1990s, the Federal Republic of Germany reversed the convictions of Tesch and the other men who were put to death, clearing their names.

On 1 February 2007, the Ortsämter (district offices) in Hamburg were done away with. In Altona, the districts of Blankenese, Lurup and Osdorf had existed and had local offices. On 1 March 2008, the Schanzenviertel neighborhood, which had spanned parts of the boroughs of Altona, Eimsbüttel and Hamburg-Mitte, became the Sternschanze quarter, the entirety of which is now in the Altona borough.

Altona is noted for being the site of the popular Altona Fischmarkt.

== Borough profile ==
Commentators and politicians, including former member of the Hamburg Parliament Stefanie von Berg, have noted that neighborhoods throughout Altona are diverse in terms of social conditions. Von Berg noted that poverty present in the Lurup and Osdorf quarters contrast with the affluent Blankenese and Nienstedten quarters within the borough.

== Geography ==
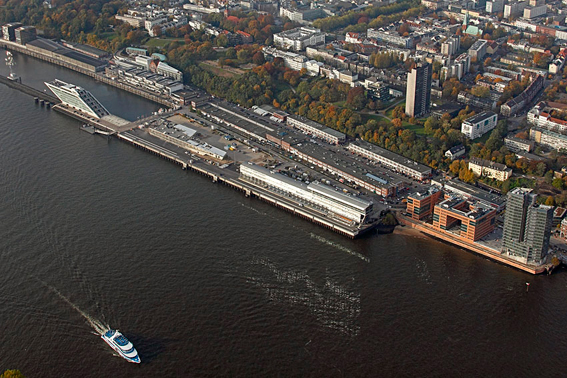
Aerial view of Altona from the South. In the foreground the Elbe quays.

The border of Altona to the south is the River Elbe, and across the river the state of Lower Saxony and the boroughs of Harburg and Hamburg-Mitte. To the east is the borough of Hamburg-Mitte and to the north is the borough of Eimsbüttel. The western border is with the state of Schleswig-Holstein. According to the statistical office of Hamburg, Altona has an area of 77.5 km^{2} or 29.9 sq mi in 2006.

=== Quarters ===
Politically, the following quarters (German: Stadtteile) are part of Altona borough:

1. Altona-Altstadt
2. Altona-Nord
3. Bahrenfeld
4. Ottensen
5. Othmarschen (including parts of Klein Flottbek)
6. Groß Flottbek
7. Osdorf
8. Lurup
9. Nienstedten (including parts of Klein Flottbek)
10. Blankenese
11. Iserbrook
12. Sülldorf
13. Rissen
14. Sternschanze

== Demographics ==
In 2018, Altona had a population of 274,702 people. 18.0% are children under the age of 18 and 17.9% are 65 years of age or older. 16.2% are immigrants. 5.0% of people are registered as unemployed. In 2018, 53,4% of all households are single-person households.

There are 195 kindergartens and 31 primary schools in Altona as well as 879 physicians in private practice, 254 dentists and 60 pharmacies.

== Politics ==
Subdivisions of Altona

Simultaneously with elections to the state parliament (Bürgerschaft), the Bezirksversammlung is elected as representatives of the citizens. It consists of 51 representatives.

=== Elections ===
District parliament election of Altona in 2024
Parties	%	±	Seats
Alliance 90/The Greens	27.6	▼7.5	14
Social Democratic Party	21.6	▲1.2	11
Christian Democratic Union	18.0	▲1.4	9
The Left	12.8	▼2.0	7
Free Democratic Party	7.6	▲0.8	4
Volt	5.6	▲5.6	3
Alternative for Germany	5.5	▲1.1	3
Others	0.6	▲0.2	0
Total			51

== Transport ==
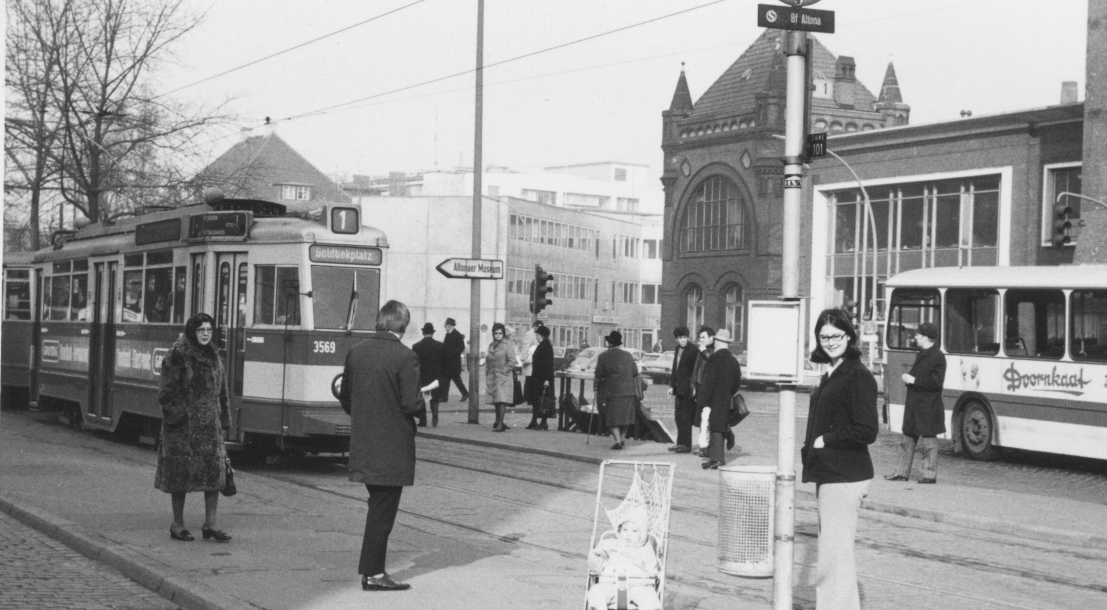
Altona Bahnhof (railway station) in 1971. Buses, streetcars, trains and S-Bahn trains all met at this spot.

Altona is the location of a major railway station, Hamburg-Altona, connecting the Hamburg S-Bahn with the regional railways and local bus lines.

The A 7 autobahn passes through Altona borough.

According to the Department of Motor Vehicles (Kraftfahrt-Bundesamt), in Altona 87,131 private cars were registered (359 cars per 1000 people).

== Notable people ==
- Jean de Labadie (1610–1674), French Christian mystic who died in Altona.
- Gluckel of Hameln (1646–1724), Jewish businesswoman and diarist.
- Jonathan Eybeschutz (1690–1764), was a Talmudist, Halachist, and Kabbalist who died in Altona.
- Jacob Emden (1697–1776), was a Talmudist, Halachist, and Kabbalist who lived most his life in Altona.
- Meshullam Solomon (1723-1794), rabbi and son of Jacob Emden.
- Johann Friedrich Struensee (1737–1772), doctor of medicine, de facto ruler of Denmark-Norway.
- Jens Jacob Eschels (1757–1842), nautical captain, author of the oldest known captain's autobiography in Germany (Born in Nieblum, died in Altona).
- Conrad Hinrich Donner (1774–1854), banker and philanthropist, of Donners Park, Altona
- Johann Heinrich Wohlien (1779–1842), organ builder
- John Henry Weber (1779–1859), fur trader and explorer in the Rocky Mountains, born and raised in Altona.
- Heinrich Christian Schumacher (1780–1850), astronomer, friend of Gauss, director of the Altona Observatory.
- Akiba Israel Wertheimer (1778–1835), was chief Rabbi in Altona from 1815 to 1835
- George Jarvis (Philhellene) (1797–1828), was the first of the American Philhellenes who took part in the Greek Revolution 1821–1829, general of Greek army, born in Altona.
- Johannes Groenland (1824–1891), botanist and microscopist who worked for Louis de Vilmorin in Paris and was born in Altona.
- Carl Reinecke (1824–1910), composer, conductor, and pianist was born in Altona
- Carl Semper (1832–1893), German ethnologist and animal ecologist
- Georg Semper (1837–1909), German entomologist
- Sophie Wörishöffer (1838–1890), was a writer of adventure stories for young people who died in Altona.
- Bernhard von Bülow (1849–1929), German politician and chancellor
- Constantin Brunner (1862–1937), German philosopher, grandson of Akiba Israel Wertheimer, was born in Altona
- Carlos Schwabe (1866-1926), painter and printmaker of the Symbolist art movement
- Karl Yens (1868–1945), plein-air painter of Southern California, born in Altona.
- Carl F. W. Borgward (1890–1963), German engineer, car designer and businessman
- Friedrich Völtzer (1895–1951), German politician was born in Altona
- Johannes de Boer (1897–1986), Highly decorated Generalleutnant during World War II, was born in Altona.
- Louise Schroeder (1887–1957), German politician (SPD)
- Hans-Friedrich Blunck (1888-1961), German jurist and writer
- Carl Theodor Sørensen (1893–1979), Danish landscape architect was born in Altona
- Julia Dingwort-Nusseck (1921–2025), German journalist
- Fatih Akın, (born 1973) Turkish film director was raised in Altona
- Eric Maxim Choupo-Moting (born 1989), Cameroonian footballer was born in Altona

== See also ==
- Altonaer FC von 1893 Football club based in the area.
- Hamburg-Altona electoral district, covering the borough
- Altona, Victoria, Australia – a suburb of Melbourne, Australia, named after Altona, Hamburg
- Altoona, Pennsylvania – named after Altona, Hamburg
- 850 Altona, an asteroid named after Altona, Hamburg
- Operation Gomorrah – WW2 RAF campaign of air raids devastating Altona
