= Mühlenau (Bekau) =

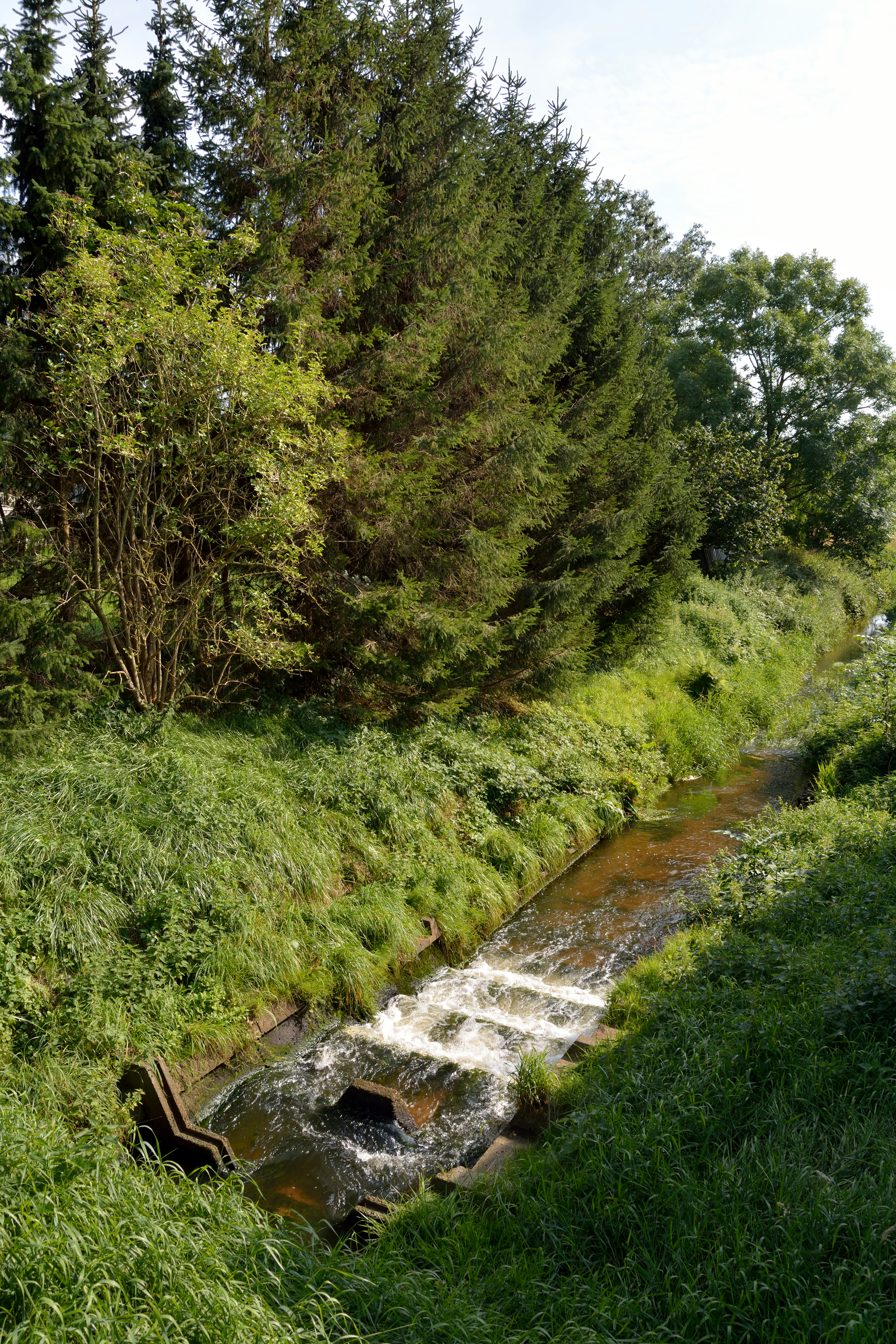

Location
- Country: Germany
- State: Schleswig-Holstein

Physical characteristics
- Mouth
  - location: Bekau
  - coordinates: 53.9927°N 9.4859°E

Basin features
- Progression: Bekau→ Stör→ Elbe→ North Sea

Mühlenau (also: Stegau) is a river of Schleswig-Holstein, Germany. It flows into the Bekau near Kaaks.

== See also ==
- List of rivers of Schleswig-Holstein
