= Bekau =

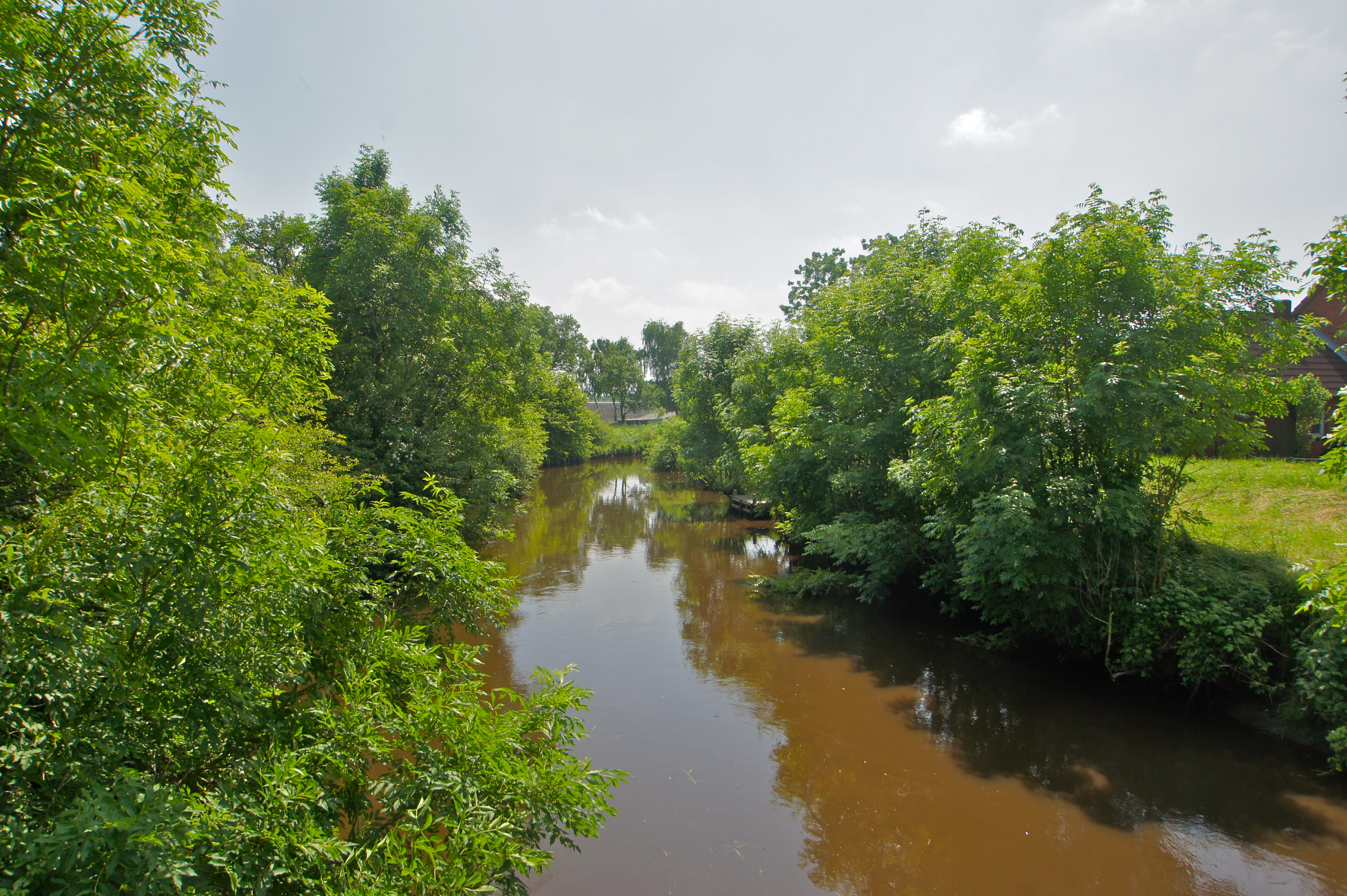
- The Beekau in Beekdörp

Location
- Country: Germany
- State: Schleswig-Holstein

Physical characteristics
- Mouth
  - location: Stör
  - coordinates: 53.9217°N 9.4475°E

Basin features
- Progression: Stör→ Elbe→ North Sea

The Bekau is a river of Schleswig-Holstein, Germany. It flows into the Stör near Bekmünde.

== See also ==
- List of rivers of Schleswig-Holstein
