= Lurup =

Quarter of Hamburg in Germany

- Quarter of Hamburg
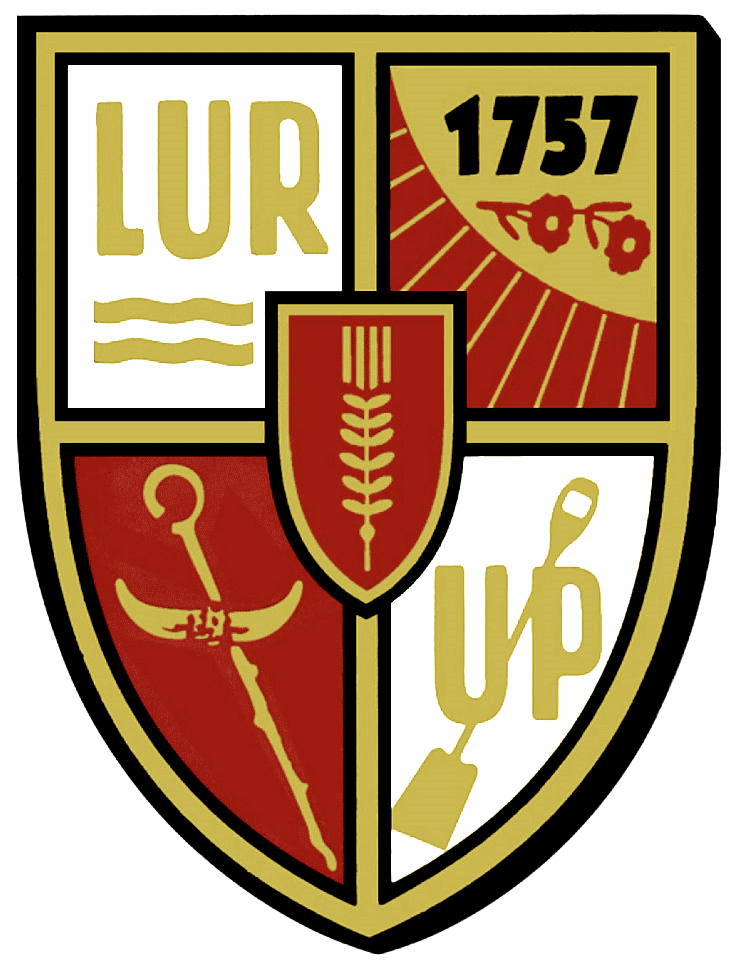
- Coat of arms

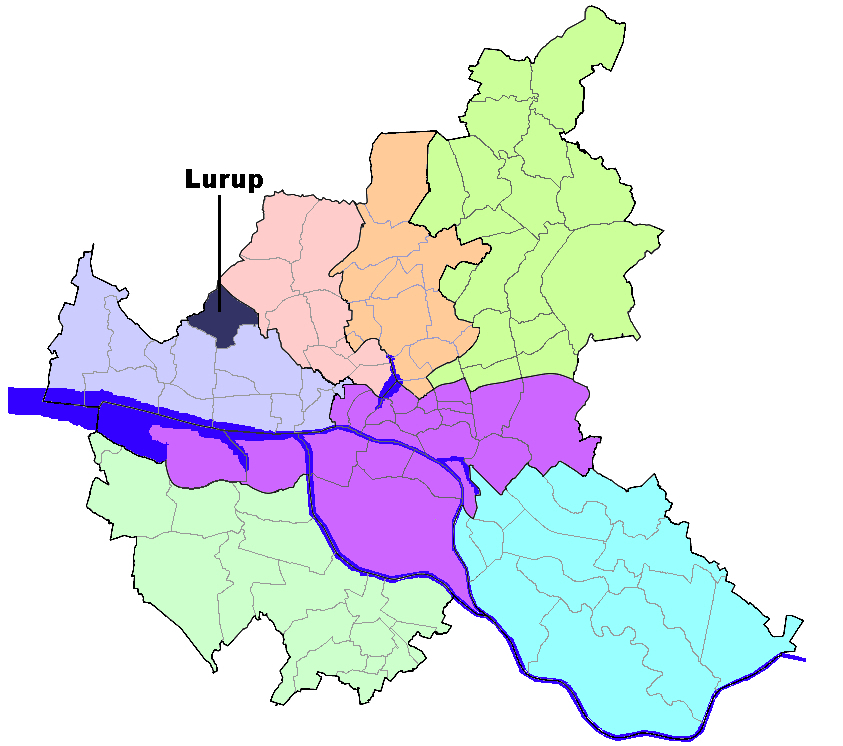
- Location of Lurup in the city of Hamburg
- Interactive map of Lurup
- Location within Germany Location within Hamburg
- Coordinates: 53°35′35″N 9°52′58″E
- Country: Germany
- State: Hamburg
- City: Hamburg
- Borough: Altona, Hamburg

Area
  - Total: 6.4 km^{2} (2.5 sq mi)

Population (2024-12-31)
  - Total: 37,755
  - Density: 5,900/km^{2} (15,000/sq mi)
- Time zone: UTC+01:00 (CET)
  - Summer (DST): UTC+02:00 (CEST)
- Postal codes: 22547, 22549
- Dialling codes: 040
- Vehicle registration: HH

Lurup (German pronunciation: [ˈluːʁʊp]) is a quarter in the Altona borough of the Free and Hanseatic city of Hamburg in northern Germany. It was formerly an independent village. In 2020 the population was 36,521.

== History ==
In 1927 Lurup was merged with Altona, and in 1938 it was merged with Altona into Hamburg with the Greater Hamburg Act.

== Geography ==
In 2006 according to the statistical office of Hamburg and Schleswig-Holstein, the quarter Lurup has a total area of 6.4 km^{2}.

The western border is formed by the railway tracks of the city train to the district of Eidelstedt, part of the borough Eimsbüttel. In the North, Lurup borders the state of Schleswig-Holstein and in the East it connects to the district of Osdorf, partially marked by the small stream of Luruper Moorgraben. In the South, Lurup borders the district of Bahrenfeld.

== Demographics ==
In 2016 the population of Lurup was 36,053. The population density was 5,247/km^{2} (13,590/sq mi). 19.9% were children under the age of 18, and 18.4% were 65 years of age or older. 19.5% were resident aliens. 7.3% people were registered as unemployed. Average annual income was 26.665 Euro.

In 2006 there were 3,035 criminal offences (91 crimes per 1000 people).

=== Population by year ===
The population is counted by the residential registration office for 31 December each year.

1987	1988	1989	1990	1991	1992	1993	1994	1995	1996	1997	1998	1999
31,041	31,010	31,321	31,636	31,754	32,015	31,868	31,751	31,625	31,558	31,884	32,035	31,986

2000	2001	2002	2003	2004	2005	2006
32,089	31,979	32,565	33,011	33,252	33,132	33,459

== Education ==
There are five elementary schools and six secondary schools in Lurup, totalling 3,343 students.

== Culture ==
=== Sports ===
The sports club SV Lurup has a stadium at Flurstraße.

== Infrastructure ==
=== Health systems ===
Lurup comprises 22 day care centers for children, 32 private medical offices and five pharmacies.

=== Transportation ===
Lurup is serviced by the rapid transit system of the city train with the station Elbgaustrasse close to Eidelstedt. Public transport in Lurup is also provided by several bus lines. Between 1955 and 1973 Lurup was connected to the Hamburg tram (Lines 1 and 11).

According to the Department of Motor Vehicles (Kraftfahrt-Bundesamt), 11,707 private cars were registered (353 cars/1000 people). 152 traffic accidents were recorded, including 121 traffic accidents with damage to persons.

== Notes ==
=== References ===
- Statistical office Hamburg and Schleswig-Holstein Statistisches Amt für Hamburg und Schleswig-Holstein, official website (in German)
