= Henstedt-Ulzburg =

- Municipality
- Coat of arms

- Location of Henstedt-Ulzburg within Segeberg district
- Interactive map of Henstedt-Ulzburg
- Location within Germany Location within Schleswig-Holstein
- Coordinates: 53°47′N 10°0′E
- Country: Germany
- State: Schleswig-Holstein
- District: Segeberg

Government
  - Mayor: Ulrike Schmidt

Area
  - Total: 39.47 km^{2} (15.24 sq mi)
- Elevation: 24–69 m (79–226 ft)

Population (2025-12-31)
  - Total: 28,345
  - Density: 718.1/km^{2} (1,860/sq mi)
- Time zone: UTC+01:00 (CET)
  - Summer (DST): UTC+02:00 (CEST)
- Postal codes: 24558
- Dialling codes: 04193
- Vehicle registration: SE
- Website: www.henstedt- ulzburg.de

Henstedt-Ulzburg is a municipality in the district of Segeberg, in Schleswig-Holstein, Germany.

== Geography ==
The municipality of Henstedt-Ulzburg is situated approximately 30 km north of Hamburg and 13 km north of Norderstedt. Currently it is the largest municipality in Schleswig-Holstein without town privileges. The rivers Alster and Pinnau rise in Henstedt-Ulzburg.

== History ==
The growing greater community of Henstedt-Ulzburg came into being on January 1, 1970, with the unification of the municipalities of Götzberg, Henstedt (with Henstedt-Rhen) and Ulzburg (with Ulzburg Süd). The three municipalities of Götzberg, Henstedt, and Ulzburg came into being during the Middle Ages as farming towns. Ulzburg is first mentioned in records in 1339, Henstedt in 1343, and Götzberg in 1520. Despite this, archaeological finds show that humans have lived in the area since the Paleolithic period, and the first settlements appeared there during the Bronze Age and the Iron Age.

== Facilities ==
North of Rhen, there is a large 380 kV/110 kV-substation. To this substation belongs also a 99 metres tall lattice tower used for radio relay links. Under the legs of this tower a road passable for trucks, but closed for public traffic runs through.

== Twin towns – sister cities ==
Henstedt-Ulzburg is twinned with:

- Maurepas, France
- Usedom, Germany
- Waterlooville, United Kingdom
- Wierzchowo, Poland

== Notable people ==
- Ole Wittmann (born 1977), art historian, specializes in the role of tattooing in art.
- Johann Scheerer (born 1982), musician and music producer based in Hamburg.
- Florentyna Parker (born 1989), an English professional golfer, lives in Hamburg
- David Kross (born 1990), actor
- Felix Drinkuth (born 1994), pro footballer; played almost 300 games
- Thore Jacobsen (born 1997), pro footballer; played over 200 games
