= Mühlenau (Pinnau) =

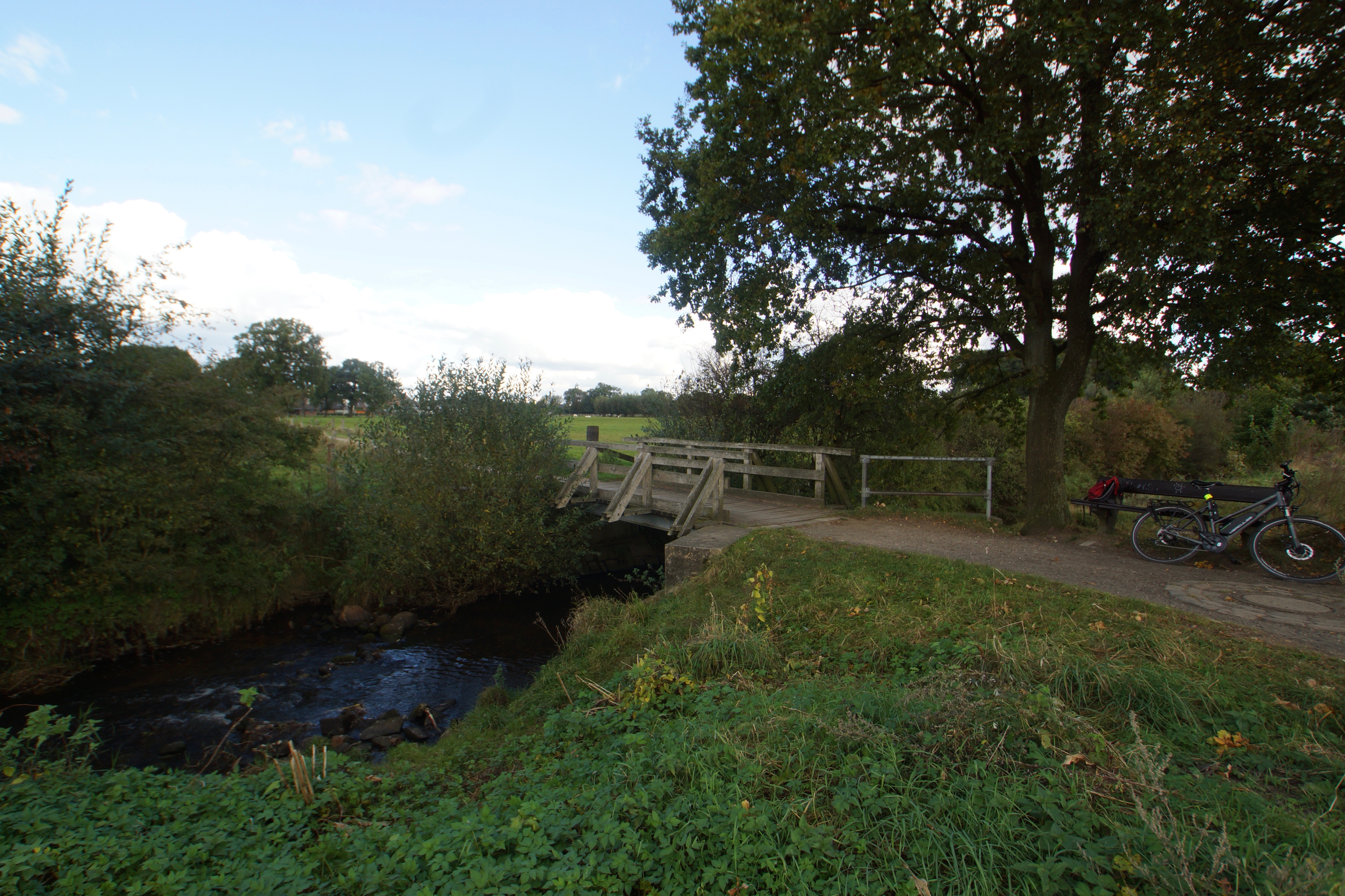
- Footbridge over the Mühlenau at the border between Ellerbek and Rellingen

Location
- Country: Germany
- State: Schleswig-Holstein

Physical characteristics
- Mouth
  - location: Pinnau
  - coordinates: 53°39′37″N 9°47′01″E
- Length: 21 km (13 mi)

Basin features
- Progression: Pinnau→ Elbe→ North Sea

Mühlenau (also: Rellau) is a river of Schleswig-Holstein, Germany, tributary of the Pinnau in Pinneberg.

== See also ==
- List of rivers of Schleswig-Holstein
