= Ellerau =

- Municipality
- Coat of arms

- Location of Ellerau within Segeberg district
- Interactive map of Ellerau
- Location within Germany Location within Schleswig-Holstein
- Coordinates: 53°45′27″N 9°54′57″E
- Country: Germany
- State: Schleswig-Holstein
- District: Segeberg

Government
  - Mayor: Ralf Martens

Area
  - Total: 7.09 km^{2} (2.74 sq mi)
- Elevation: 24 m (79 ft)

Population (2025-12-31)
  - Total: 6,042
  - Density: 852/km^{2} (2,210/sq mi)
- Time zone: UTC+01:00 (CET)
  - Summer (DST): UTC+02:00 (CEST)
- Postal codes: 25479
- Dialling codes: 04106
- Vehicle registration: SE
- Website: www.ellerau.de

Ellerau is a municipality in the Kreis (district) of Segeberg in Schleswig-Holstein, north Germany. It is situated some 24 km north of Hamburg, and 8 km northwest of Norderstedt.

== Notable people ==
Otto Friedrich August Meinardus German Coptologist, writer and pastor (1925-2005)
