= Schenefeld, Pinneberg =

Schenefeld
- Town
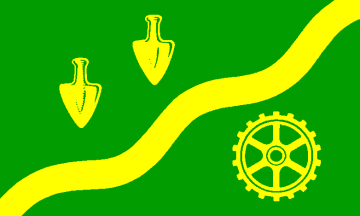
- Flag Coat of arms

- Location of Schenefeld within Pinneberg district
- Interactive map of Schenefeld
- Location within Germany Location within Schleswig-Holstein
- Coordinates: 53°36′10″N 9°49′24″E
- Country: Germany
- State: Schleswig-Holstein
- District: Pinneberg

Government
  - Mayor: Christiane Küchenhof (SPD)

Area
  - Total: 9.99 km^{2} (3.86 sq mi)
- Elevation: 21 m (69 ft)

Population (2025-12-31)
  - Total: 19,875
  - Density: 1,990/km^{2} (5,150/sq mi)
- Time zone: UTC+01:00 (CET)
  - Summer (DST): UTC+02:00 (CEST)
- Postal codes: 22869
- Dialling codes: 040
- Vehicle registration: PI
- Website: www.stadt-schenefeld.de

Schenefeld (German pronunciation: [ˈʃeːnəfɛlt]; Low German: Scheenfeld) is a town in the district of Pinneberg, in Schleswig-Holstein, Germany. It is situated at the northwest border of Hamburg.

A 3.4 km tunnel between the town and the DESY research centre in Hamburg houses the European X-ray free-electron laser, with the research campus for the facility also located in Schenefeld.

Melanie Diener, a German operatic and concert soprano, was born in Schenefeld.
