= Schmalfelder Au =

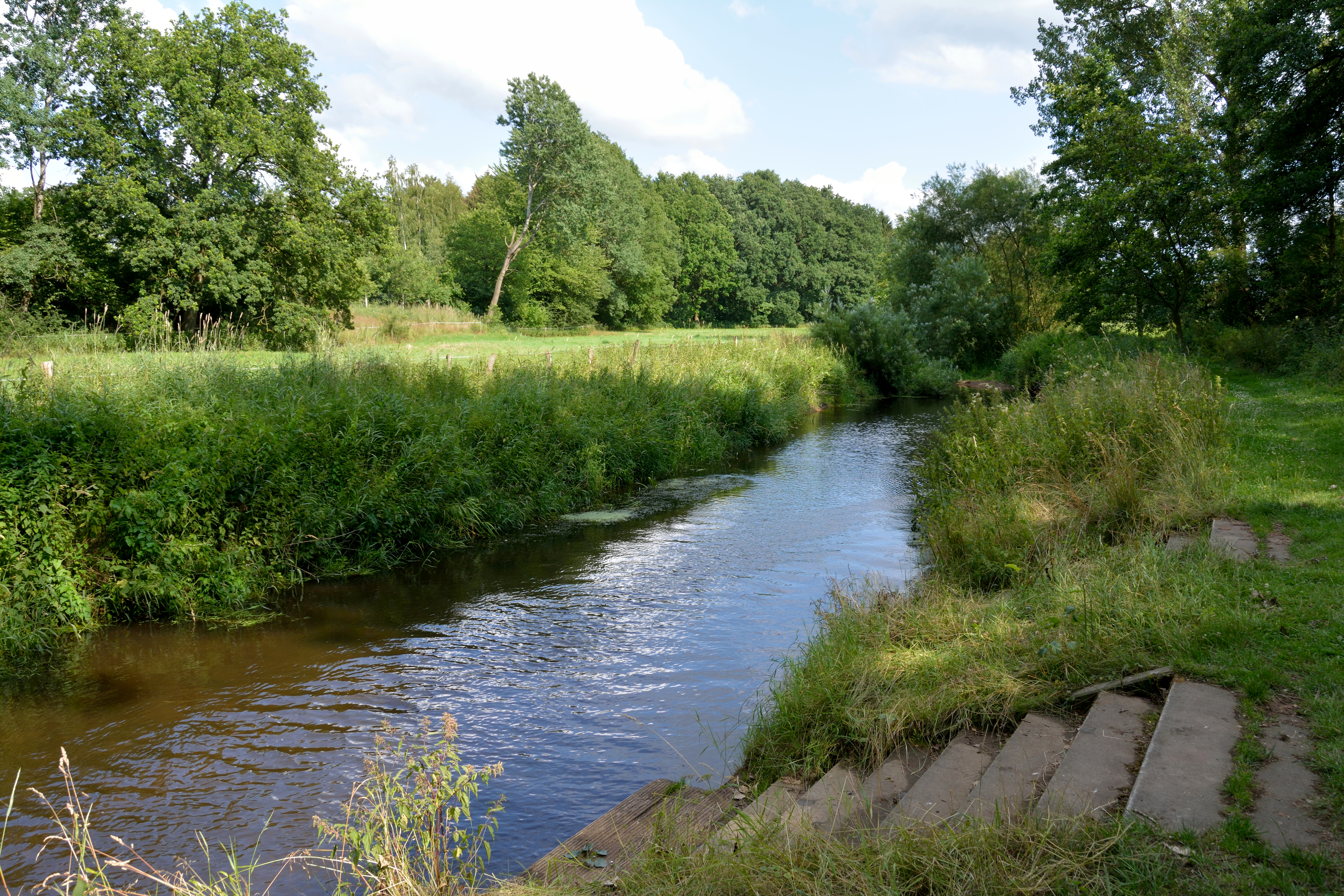

Location
- Country: Germany
- States: Schleswig-Holstein

Physical characteristics
- Mouth
  - location: Hudau
  - coordinates: 53.9092°N 9.8883°E

Basin features
- Progression: Hudau→ Bramau→ Stör→ Elbe→ North Sea

Schmalfelder Au is a river of Schleswig-Holstein, Germany. It flows into the Hudau near Bad Bramstedt.

== See also ==
- List of rivers of Schleswig-Holstein
