= Uetersen =

- Town
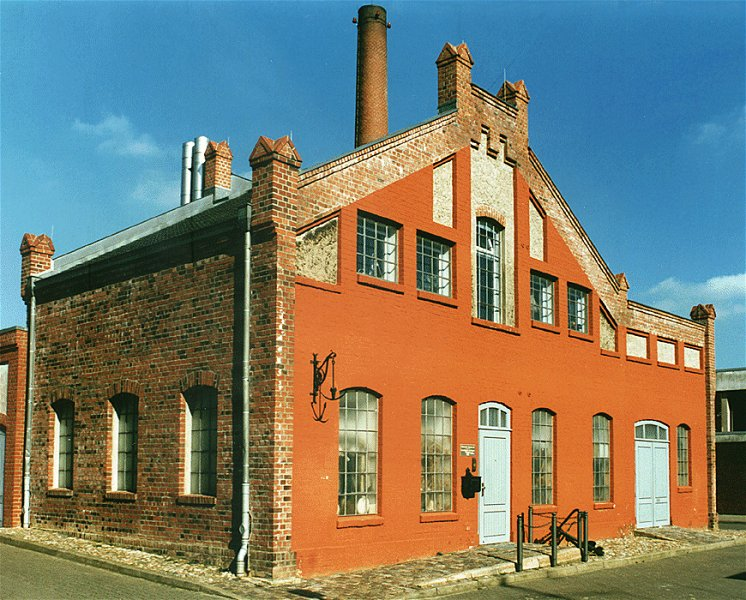

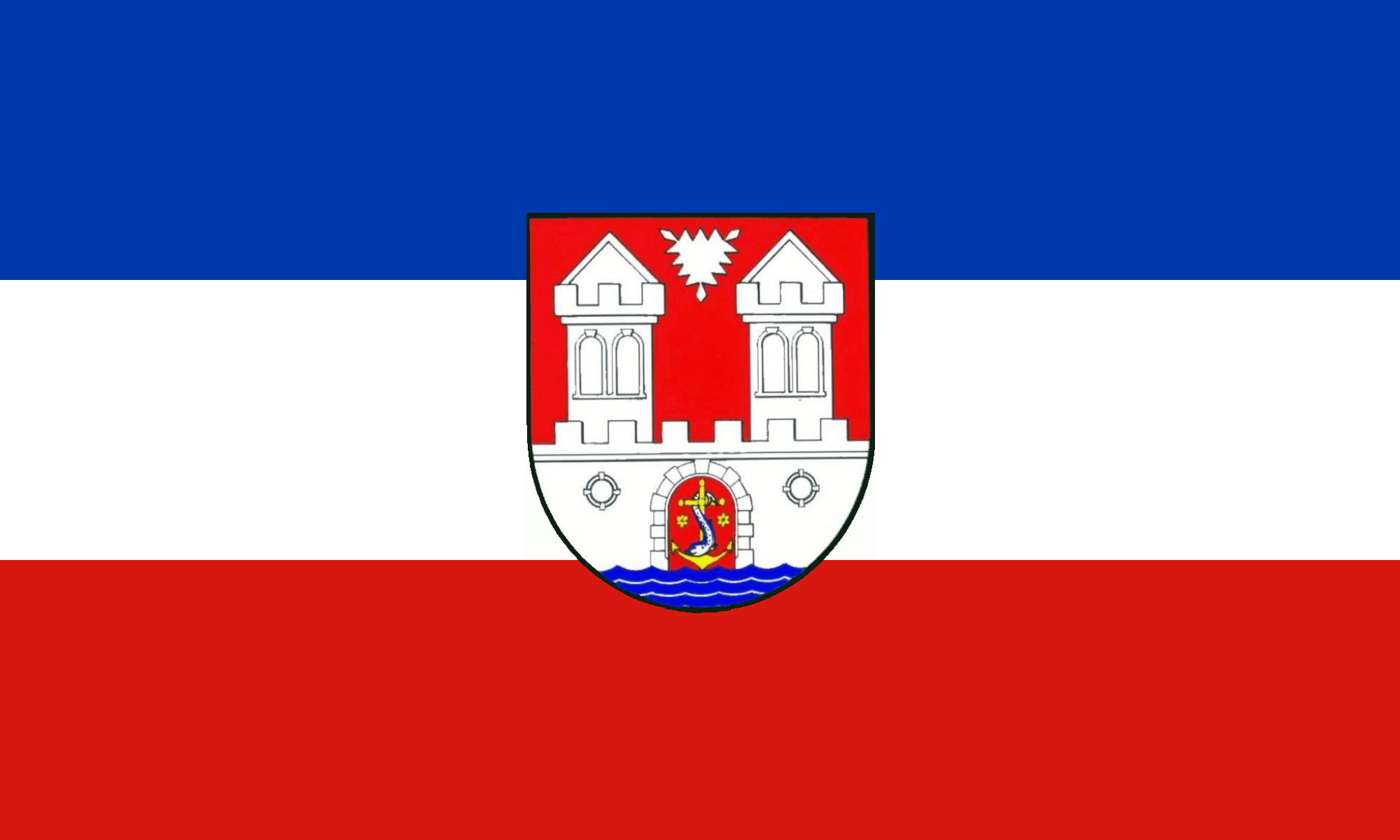
- Flag Coat of arms

- Location of Uetersen within Pinneberg district
- Interactive map of Uetersen
- Location within Germany Location within Schleswig-Holstein
- Coordinates: 53°41′14″N 9°40′9″E
- Country: Germany
- State: Schleswig-Holstein
- District: Pinneberg

Government
  - Mayor: Andrea Hansen

Area
  - Total: 11.43 km^{2} (4.41 sq mi)
- Elevation: 1–18 m (3.3–59.1 ft)

Population (2025-12-31)
  - Total: 18,936
  - Density: 1,657/km^{2} (4,291/sq mi)
- Time zone: UTC+01:00 (CET)
  - Summer (DST): UTC+02:00 (CEST)
- Postal codes: 25436
- Dialling codes: 04122
- Vehicle registration: PI
- Website: uetersen.de

Uetersen (German pronunciation: [ˈyːtɐzn̩], formerly known as Ütersen (Holstein)) is a town in the district of Pinneberg, in Schleswig-Holstein, Germany. It is situated approximately 7 km (4.3 mi) south of Elmshorn, and 30 km (19 mi) northwest of Hamburg at the small Pinnau River, close to the Elbe river. Uetersen is home to the Rosarium Uetersen, the oldest and largest rose garden in Northern Germany, created in 1929.

== Name ==
The name of the city Uetersen, "utmost end", probably arose because it is "at the extreme end", referring to the fact that its location is at the transition to the geest Seestermüher marsh. But there is also the suspicion that the name of "Ütersteen" showing what "ultra-stone" or "Ütristina", the old name of Pinnau originates.

== Mayors since 1870 ==
Years	Name
1870–1900	Ernst-Heinrich Meßtorff
1900–1914	Heinrich Muuß
1914–1918	Ernst Ladewig Meyn
1918–1930	Jakob Christians
1930–1933	Heinrich Wellenbring (SPD)
1933	Ferdinand Bauth (acting)
1933–1945	Hermann Dölling (NSDAP)
1945	Heinrich Stühmeyer (acting)

Years	Name
1945–1956	Heinrich Wilkens (SPD)
1956–1964	Dr. Jürgen Frenzel (SPD)
1964–1988	Waldemar Dudda (SPD)
1988–1994	Wolfgang Bromma (SPD)
1994–2003	Karl Gustav Tewes
2003–2009	Wolfgang Wiech
2009–	Andrea Hansen

== Number of inhabitants ==
- 1803: 2601
- 1855: 3906
- 1871: 4037
- 1905: 6300
- 1935: 7236
- 1951: 15485
- 1995: 18155
- 2007: 17852
- 2008: 17739
- 2009: 17688
- 2010: 17558
- 2011: 17829

== Coat of arms ==
Blazon:In a red shield is a silver gate without any door. The wall has six pinnacles. There is a silver tower on each side, having two windows each and topped by silver triangular roofs. Between the towers there is the nettle-leaf of the Counts of Holstein. In the open door at the base there stands a silver S-shaped object, which might show the Virgin Mary and Jesus, standing upon a golden crescent moon and flanked by two golden stars on a red background. Below the door is a blue field that is thought to symbolize water.

== Notable people ==
=== Known Uetersener ===
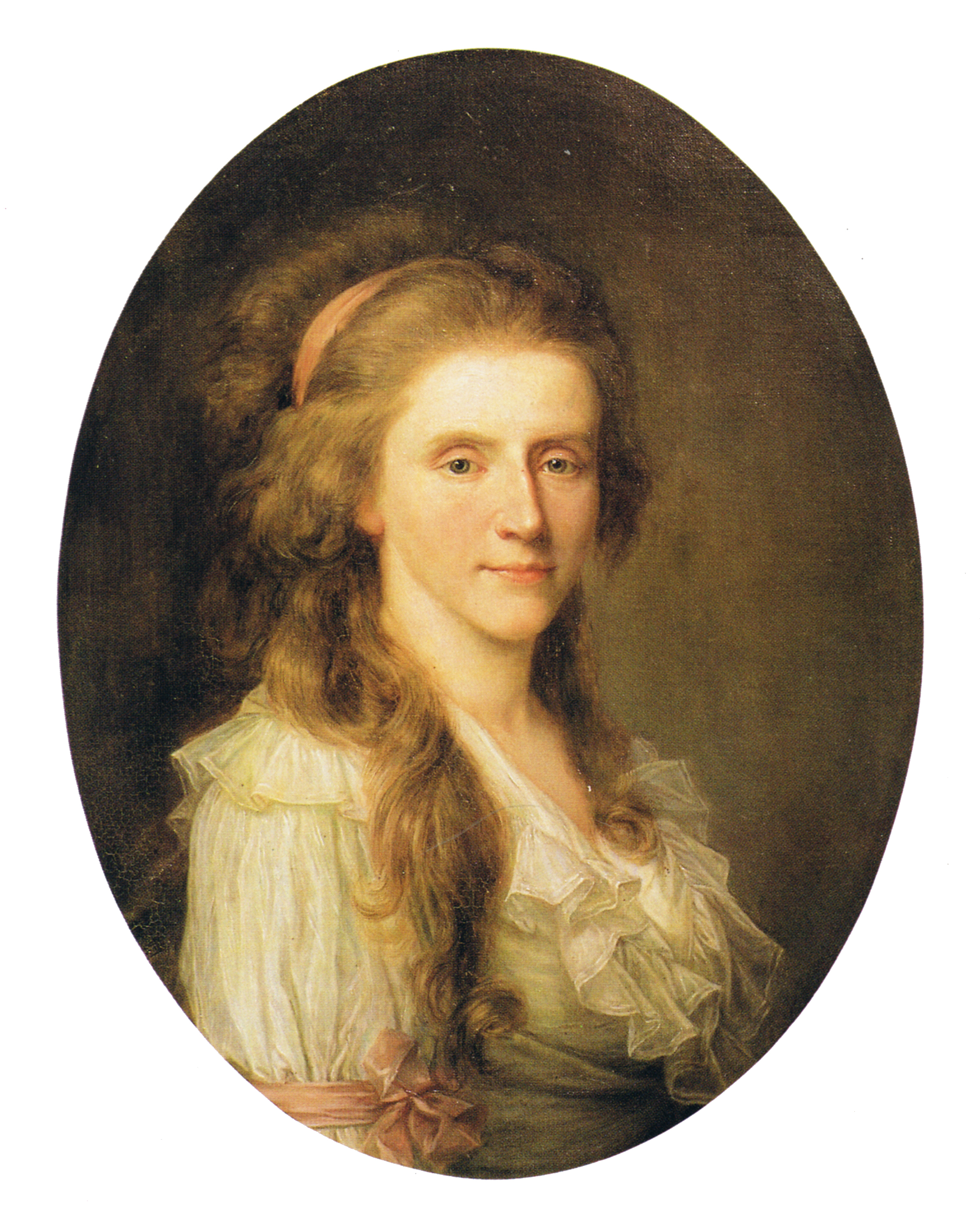
Augusta Louise zu Stolberg-Stolberg in 1780

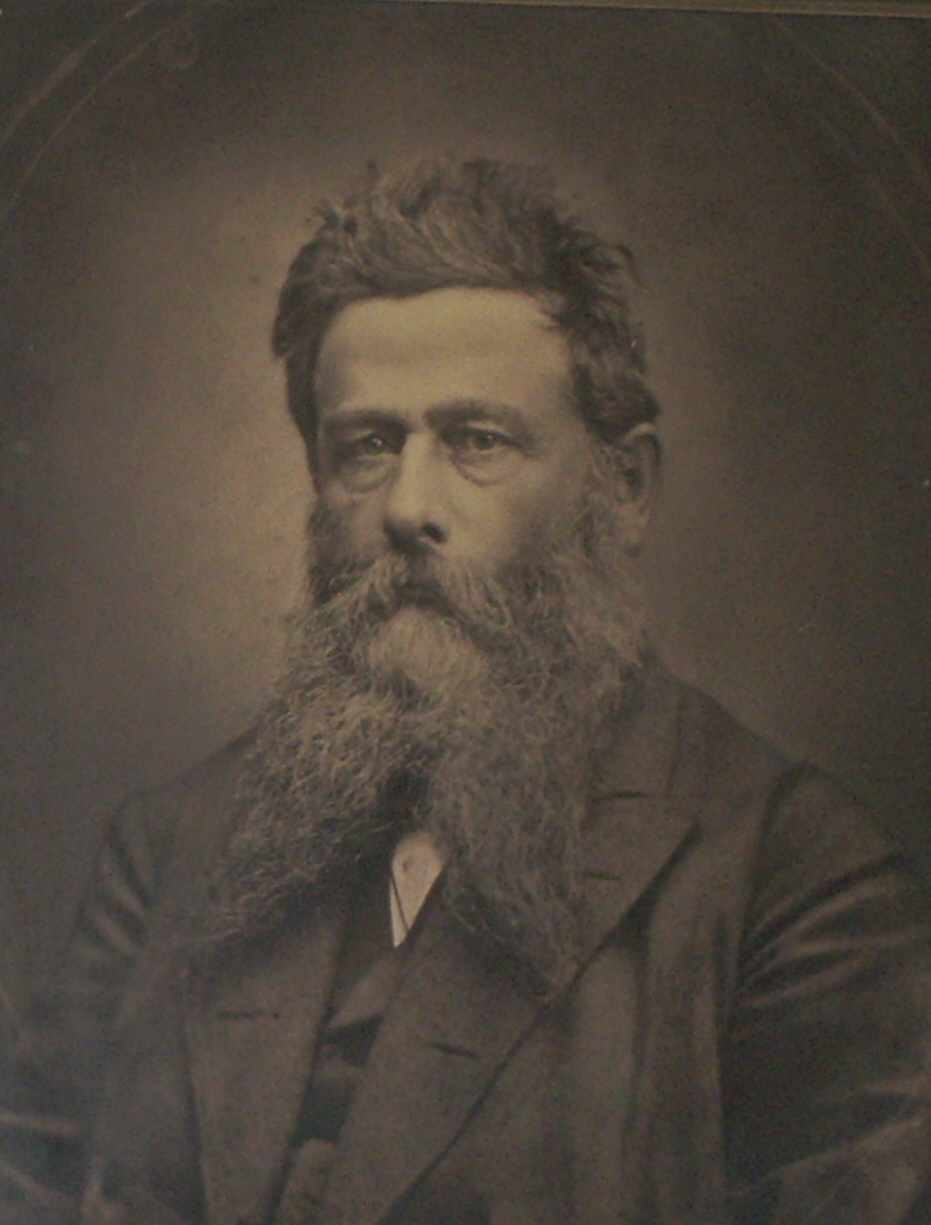
Ludwig Meyn in 1878

People who were born in Uetersen, live or have lived and worked in the town or have been involved with it.

- Metta von Oberg (1737–1794), baronesse
- Augusta Louise zu Stolberg-Stolberg (1753–1835), penfriend of Johann Wolfgang von Goethe
- Detlef Lienau, (1818–1887), architect
- Ludwig Meyn, (1820–1878), agricultural scientist and geologist, died in Uetersen
- Friedrich Neelsen (1854–1898), pathologist and scientist
- Arthur Drews, (1865–1935), writer and philosopher
- Franz Kruckenberg (1882-1965), an engineer and pioneer of high speed railway systems, like the Schienenzeppelin
- Kurt Roth (1899–1975), painter, died in Uetersen
- Werner Lange (1917–1979), Mühlenkaufmann, inherited the 27-hectare (67-acre) site of the Langenmühle to the city of Uetersen
- Willi Gerdau (1929–2011), footballer of the national team of 1957, died in Uetersen

=== More people who are closely linked to Uetersen ===
These people have lived in Uetersen or are closely linked to the town. They have contributed to the reputation of the town or to the general welfare of the population.

- Helmuth Karl Bernhard von Moltke (1800–1891), Prussian field marshal

== International relations ==
Uetersen is twinned with:

- Wittstock, Ostprignitz-Ruppin district of Brandenburg.

== Literature ==
- Rudolf Lavorenz: Uetersen, ISBN 3-89702-541-8 (de)
- Theodor von Kobbe: Die Schweden im Kloster zu Uetersen (1830) (de)
- Carl Bulcke: Silkes Liebe (1906) (Fate of the Roman society Uetersener) (de)
- Elsa Plath-Langheinrich: Als Goethe nach Uetersen schrieb ISBN 3-529-02695-6 (de)
- Johann Wolfgang von Goethe: Briefe an Augusta Louise zu Stolberg (de)
- Goethes Briefe ins holsteinische Kloster Uetersen ISBN 3-529-02682-4 (de)
- Lothar Mosler: Blickpunkt Uetersen (Geschichte und Geschichten 1234 - 1984) (1985) (de)
- Lothar Mosler: Mit der Eisenbahn durch Uetersen (1996) (de)
- Lothar Mosler: Rosenstadt Uetersen im Wandel der Zeiten (1971) (de)
- Dr. Ernst Brütt und Gerhard Scharfenstein: Uetersen und seine Einwohner (1995) (de)
- Andreas Fründt: Das Hochadeliche Closter zu Uetersen (1986) (de)
- Michael Schubert: Uetersen zwischen Marsch und Geest (1998) ISBN 3-86134-773-3 (de)
