= Ohlau (disambiguation) =

Ohlau may refer to:

- Oława (German: Ohlau), a town in south-western Poland
- Oława (river), a river of Poland, tributary of the Oder
- Ohlau (Hudau), a river of Schleswig-Holstein, Germany, tributary of the Hudau
- John George of Ohlau (Polish: Jan Jerzy oławski) (1552–1592), Duke of Ohlau and Wohlau Wołów
