= Catharine Stolberg =

Danish-German countess and writer (1751–1832)

- Henriette Katharina zu Stolberg-Stolberg
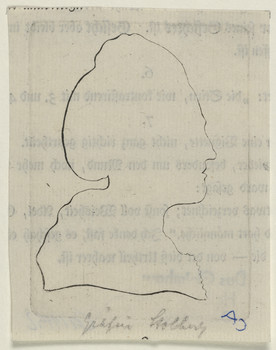
- Silhouette taken by Johann Kaspar Lavater, 1778
- Born: December 5, 1751; Bad Bramstedt, Duchy of Holstein
- Died: February 22, 1832 (aged 80); Pieszyce, Province of Silesia
- Relatives: Friedrich Leopold zu Stolberg-Stolberg (brother); Christian of Stolberg-Stolberg (brother)

Catharine Stolberg (5 December 1751, Bad Bramstedt – 22 February 1832, Pieszyce), was a Danish-German countess and writer. She published novels and plays, and was also known for her biography and her preserved correspondence.

Stolberg was a very productive writer. However, the majority of her poems and stories were sent to family and friends in letters, without the intention to publish them. It was only at the insistence of those she corresponded with that she published the drama Moses in 1788, followed by two short stories: Rosalia and Emma. Many of her letters, as well as short memoirs of her youth which she had written to her niece, were published posthumously.

== Biography ==
Henriette Catharine Stolberg was born 5 December 1751 in Bad Bramstedt, Duchy of Holstein to Christian Günther Stolberg (1714–1765) and Christiane C.G. Castell-Remlingen (1722–1773). She had eleven siblings, including Christian Stolberg and Friedrich Leopold zu Stolberg-Stolberg. When she was five years old, the family moved to Copenhagen, where her father was the head of the court of the Dowager Queen Sophie Magdalene. The family resided partly in Copenhagen and partly at the queen's residence, Hirschholm Palace.

Unlike her brothers, Stolberg received no formal education. Instead, her parents instructed her education and she became well-read in several languages, learning Greek, Latin, and Italian with her brothers in addition to German and Danish. Her mother was religiously strict and forbid her daughters to read literature for entertainment, but she was particularly influenced by Friedrich Gottlieb Klopstock's Der Messias and the work of Edward Young. Through competition with her brothers, she became one of the most learned women of literature at the time. She ancient greek literature, wrote to her brother Frederich Leopold in Italian, and praised the work of Johann Wolfgang von Goethe. As a young woman, she dedicated herself to writing, producing the short drama Moses in 1788 and two further short stories: Rosalia and Emma.

Stolberg was often described as restless, preoccupied, and eccentric, which often led to clashes with her family and acquaintances. Wilhelm von Humboldt described her as "a brouillon, such as can only exist on earth." Shortly after her father's death, Stolberg moved with her mother to Hamburg in 1770. In 1774, Stolberg became a nun at Vallø stift, though throughout her life she rarely remained fixed in one place for long. From 1783 to 1784 she traveled to Italy with Fritz and Julie Reventlow.

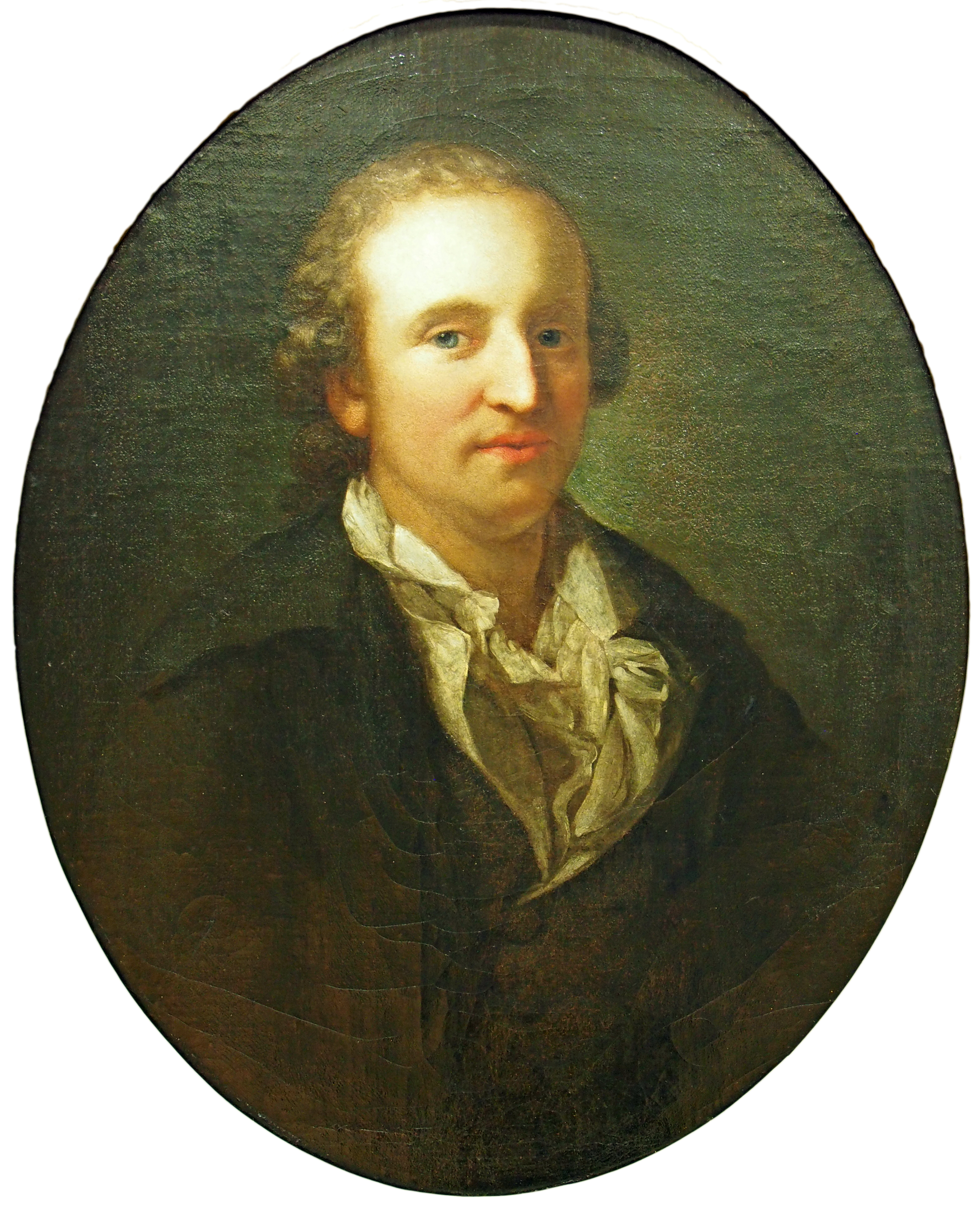
Catherine's brother, Friedrich Leopold, painted by Anton Graff in 1785

She had a particularly close relationship with her brother, Friedrich Leopold. She resided at his home for many years and was nurse and tutor to his children, tending to his daughters in particular after their mother had died. In 1802, she, like her brother Friedrich Leopold, converted to Catholicism. However, she converted back to Lutheranism the next year, following harsh criticism from her family. She developed a relationship with Gottlob Friedrich Ernst Schönborn (1737–1817), a childhood friend of her brother's who was then residing with her close friends Fritz and Julie Reventlow in Emkendorf. They began seeing each other in 1806, and though they never married, remained together until his death in 1817.

In her old age, Stolberg went blind and resided at the home of her niece, Marie Agnes, who was Frederich Leopold's eldest daughter. She died there, in Pieszyce, Province of Silesia, on 22 February 1832.
