= Metta von Oberg =

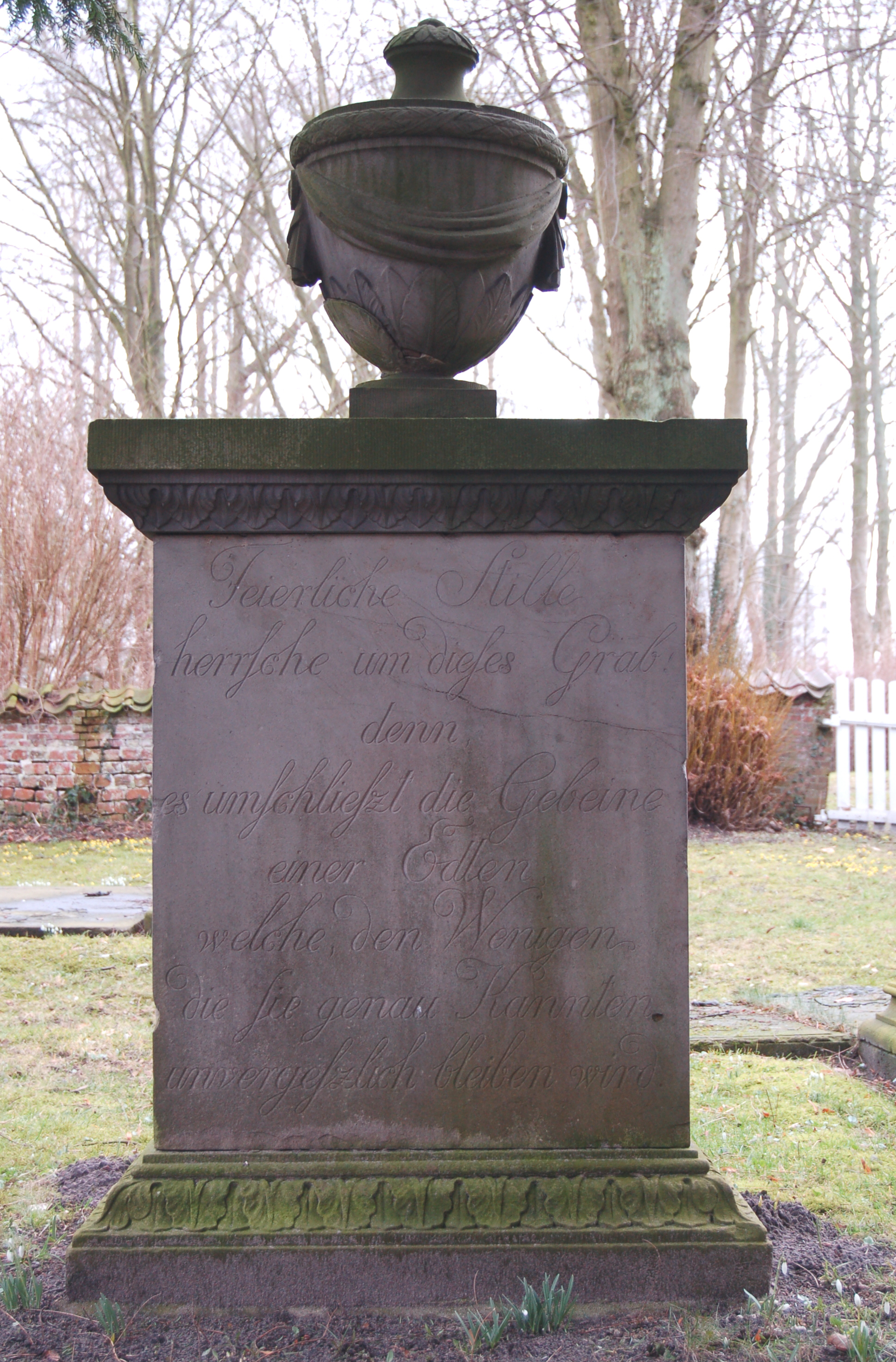
Gravestone of Metta von Oberg

Anna Metta von Oberg (November 10, 1737 – October 25, 1794) was a German Baroness and close friend to Augusta Louise zu Stolberg-Stolberg.

Von Oberg was born in Jersbek, Duchy of Holstein, and lived in the period from 1762 to 1794 in the monastery of Uetersen. There she met Augusta Louise zu Stolberg-Stolberg. After they left the monastery, they lived together in a small apartment south of the monastery. Although Metta was 15 years older, they were linked in a deep friendship. She also played a part in the heart of the friendship between Augusta Louise and the poet Johann Wolfgang von Goethe. Again and again she encouraged the young Augusta Louise in correspondence with the poet, unaware that both would feature in later literary history. Even after 1783, when Augusta Louise moved to Copenhagen and married the Danish Minister of State Peter Andreas Bernstorff, she remained at the side of her best friend. Metta von Oberg died at the age of 57 after years of illness in the monastery of Uetersen.

It is thought that without Metta von Oberg, the lively exchange of letters between Augusta Louise zu Stolberg-Stolberg and the poet Goethe would not have been as valuable as it is.

== Sources ==
- Hans Ferdinand Bubbe: Versuch einer Chronik der Stadt und des Klosters Uetersen. Band 2 Page 35-37 (1938) (de)
- Plath-Langheinrich, Elsa: Als Goethe nach Uetersen schrieb: Das Leben der Conventualin Augusta Louise Gräfin zu Stolberg-Stolberg. ISBN 3-529-02695-6 (de)
