= Rosarium Uetersen =

Rose garden located in the Rosenstadt Uetersen, Schleswig-Holstein, Germany

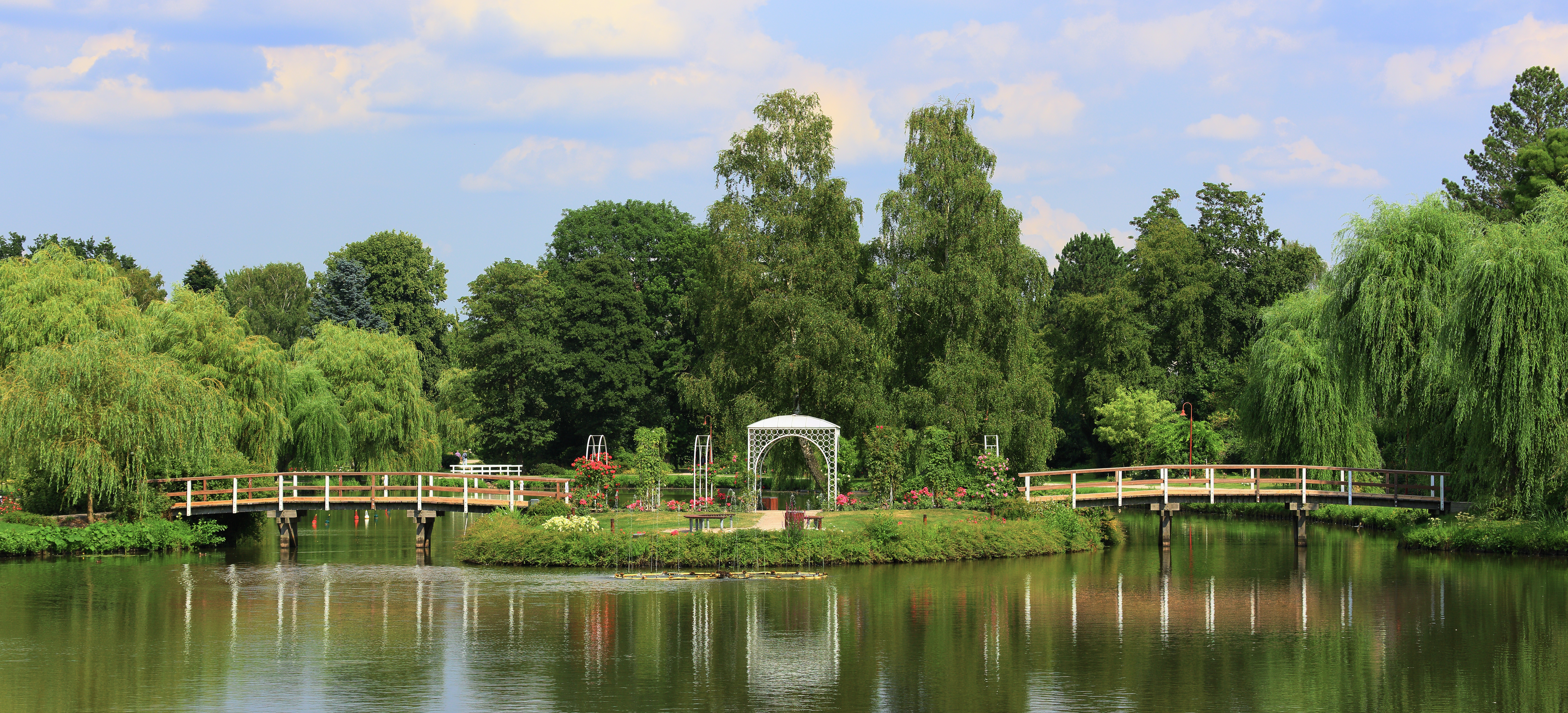
- Interactive map of Rosarium Uetersen
- Type: Rose garden
- Location: Wassermühlenstraße 7, Uetersen
- Coordinates: 53°41′2″N 9°40′10″E
- Area: 5.2 ha (12.85 acres)
- Created: 1909 / 1934
- Operator: Stadt Uetersenen
- Plants: 900
- Website: Rosarium Uetersen

The Rosarium Uetersen is a rose garden located in the Rosenstadt Uetersen, Schleswig-Holstein, Germany, and is the oldest and largest rose garden in Northern Germany.

Today's rosarium was created between 1929 and 1934, and opened to the public on the occasion of the 700 year festivities of Uetersen on June 23, 1934. The park, originally designed by landscaping architect Berthold Thormählen and three well-known German rose breeders from Holstein, Mathias Tantau, Wilhelm Kordes, and Krause, covers at present over seven hectares, and is open to the public.

During the last eighty years, the rose garden was altered several times due to weather influences, extensions, and reorganisations. The rose garden is updated regularly through the plantation of new cultivars, and today presents more than 900 rose varieties in 35,000 rose plants in all colour hues and aroma nuances with a focus on climbing and standard roses.

The rose garden is laid out in a strict geometrical design around two ponds, the large and the small Mühlenteich (German for mill pond). The larger one is divided by an island, called Hochzeitsinsel (marriage island), that can be reached through bridges from both sides. The park also holds a garden café, restaurant and hotel.

Several rose cultivars were called either after the city or the rose garden itself, for instance the pink climber 'Rosarium Uetersen' (Kordes 1977), its two sports 'Uetersens Rosenkönigin' and 'Uetersens Rosenprinzessin' (both discovered by Kordes and introduced in 2009), and the cream-coloured climber 'Uetersener Klosterrose' (Evers/Tantau 2006).

== Gallery ==
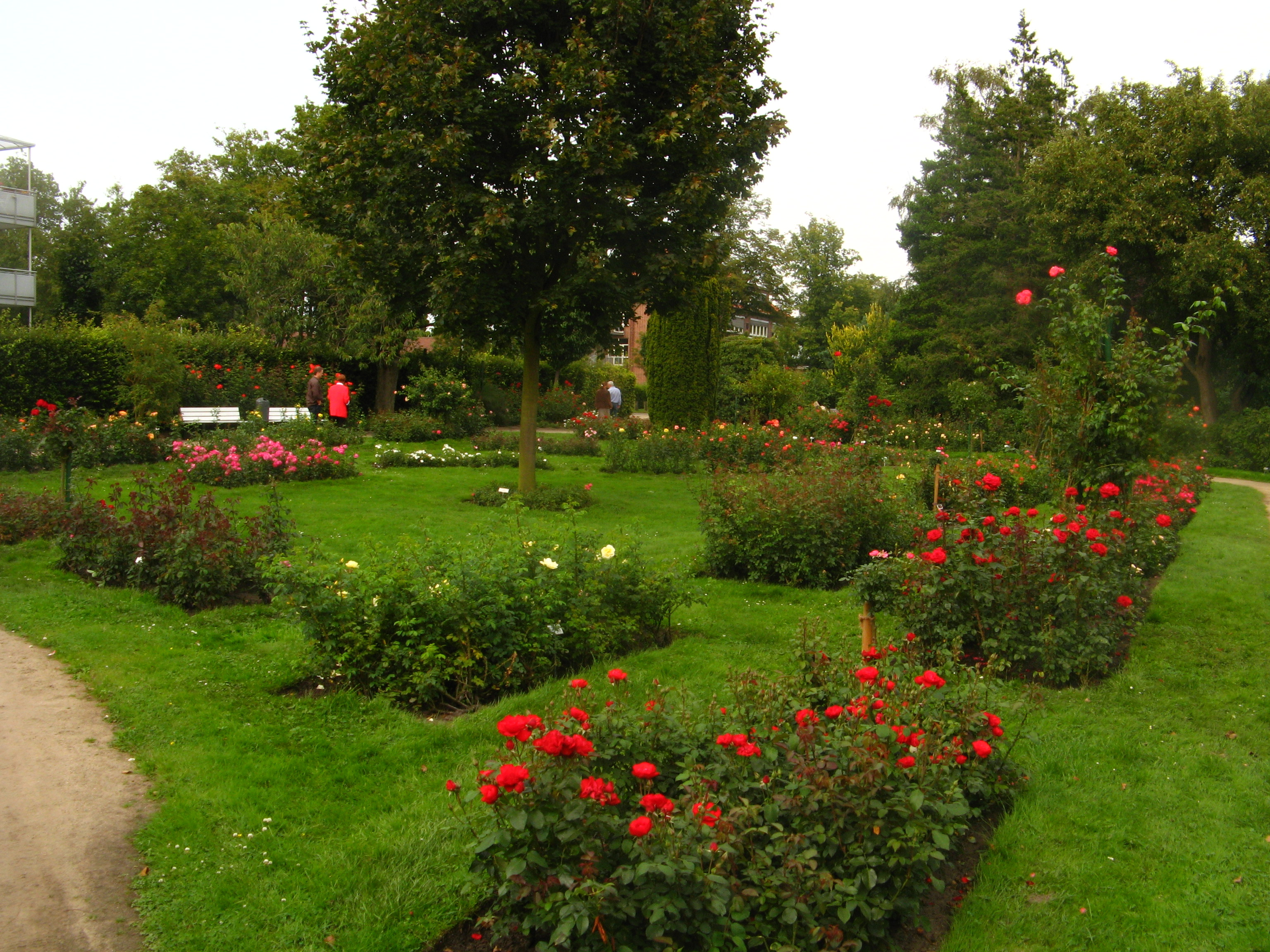
Rose beds

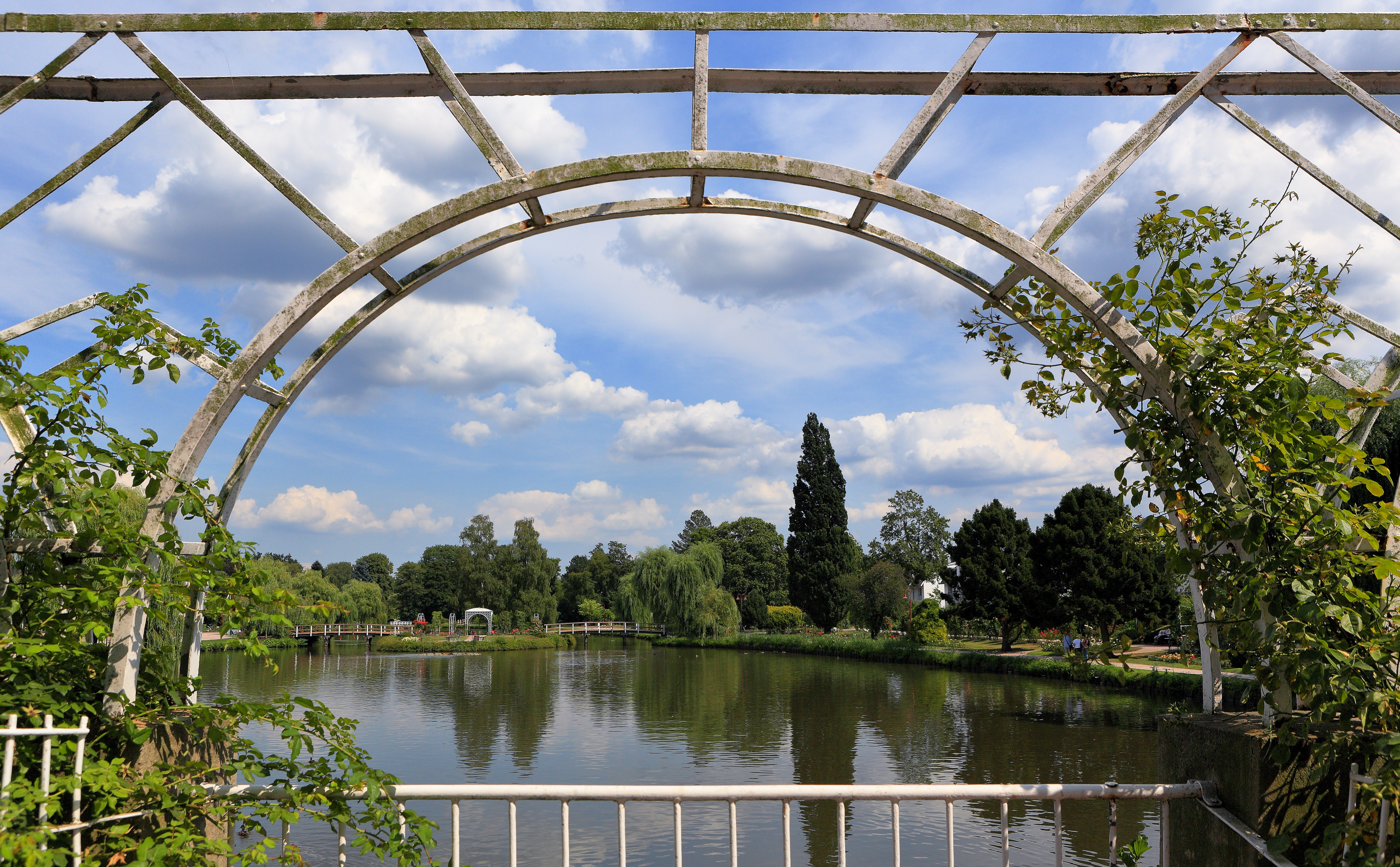
The larger Mühlenteich with the Hochzeitsinsel in the background

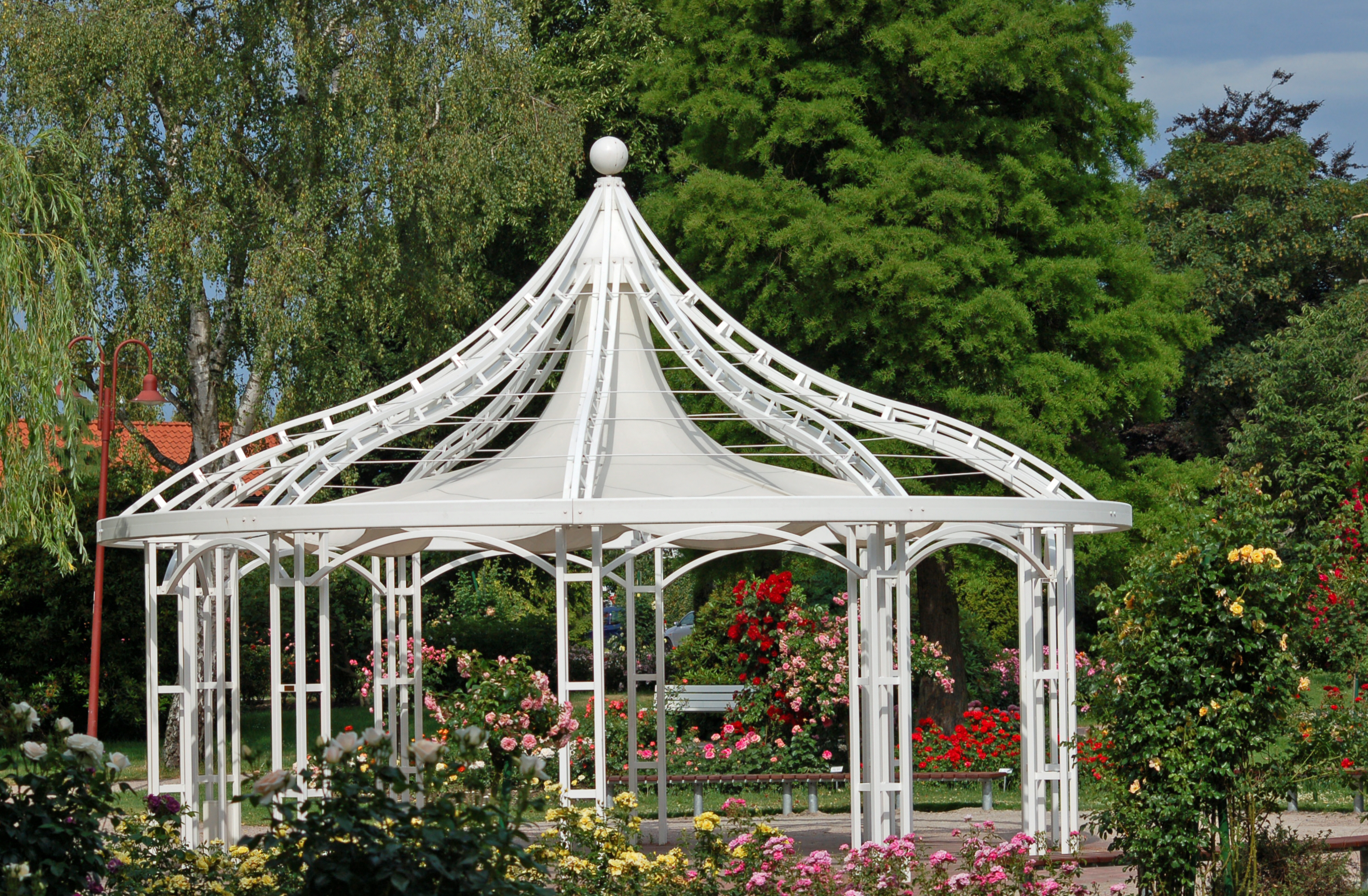
The Liebeslaube (love nest)

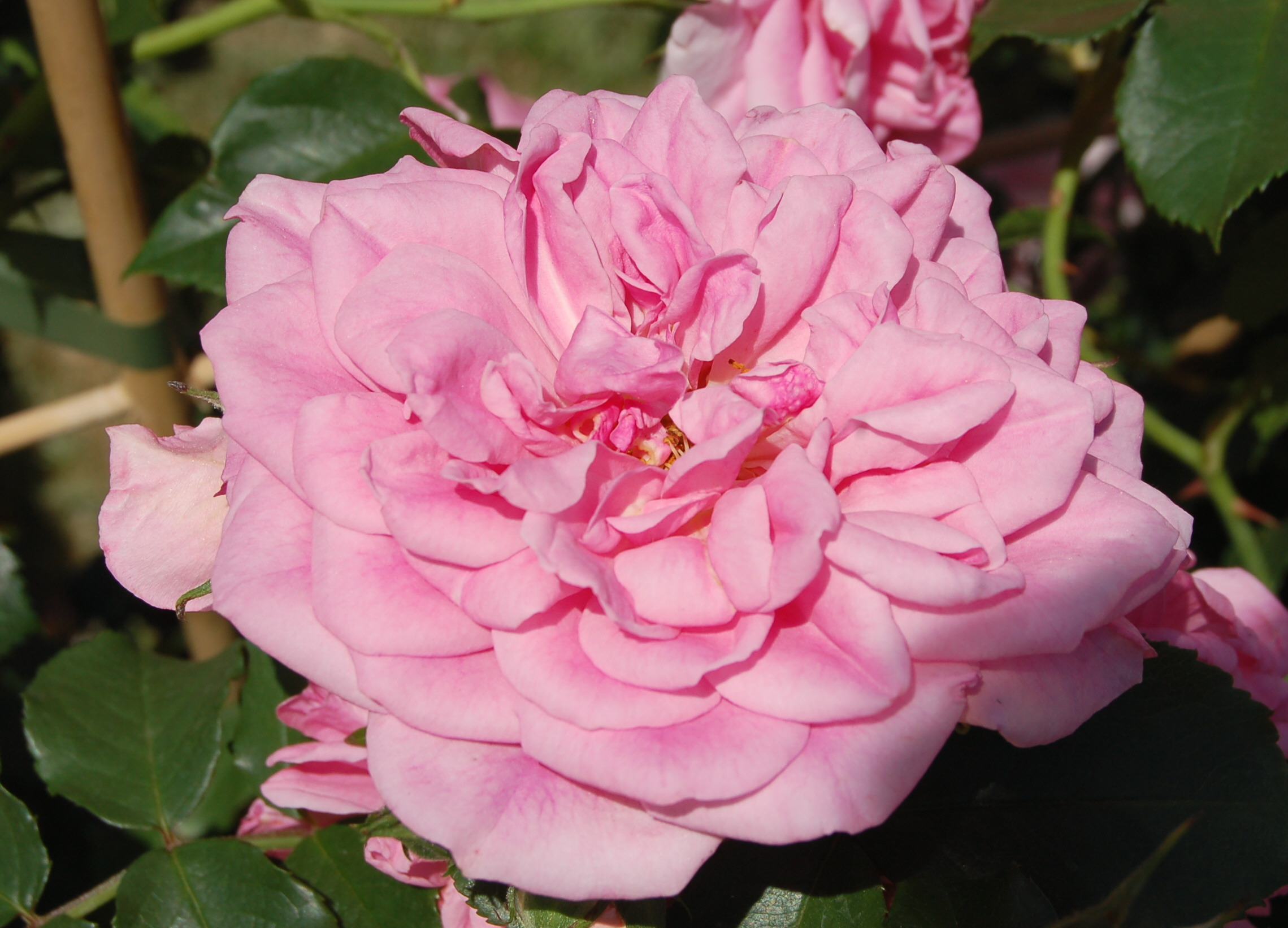
Rosa arbustiva 'Uetersens Rosenprinzessin' (Kordes, 2009)

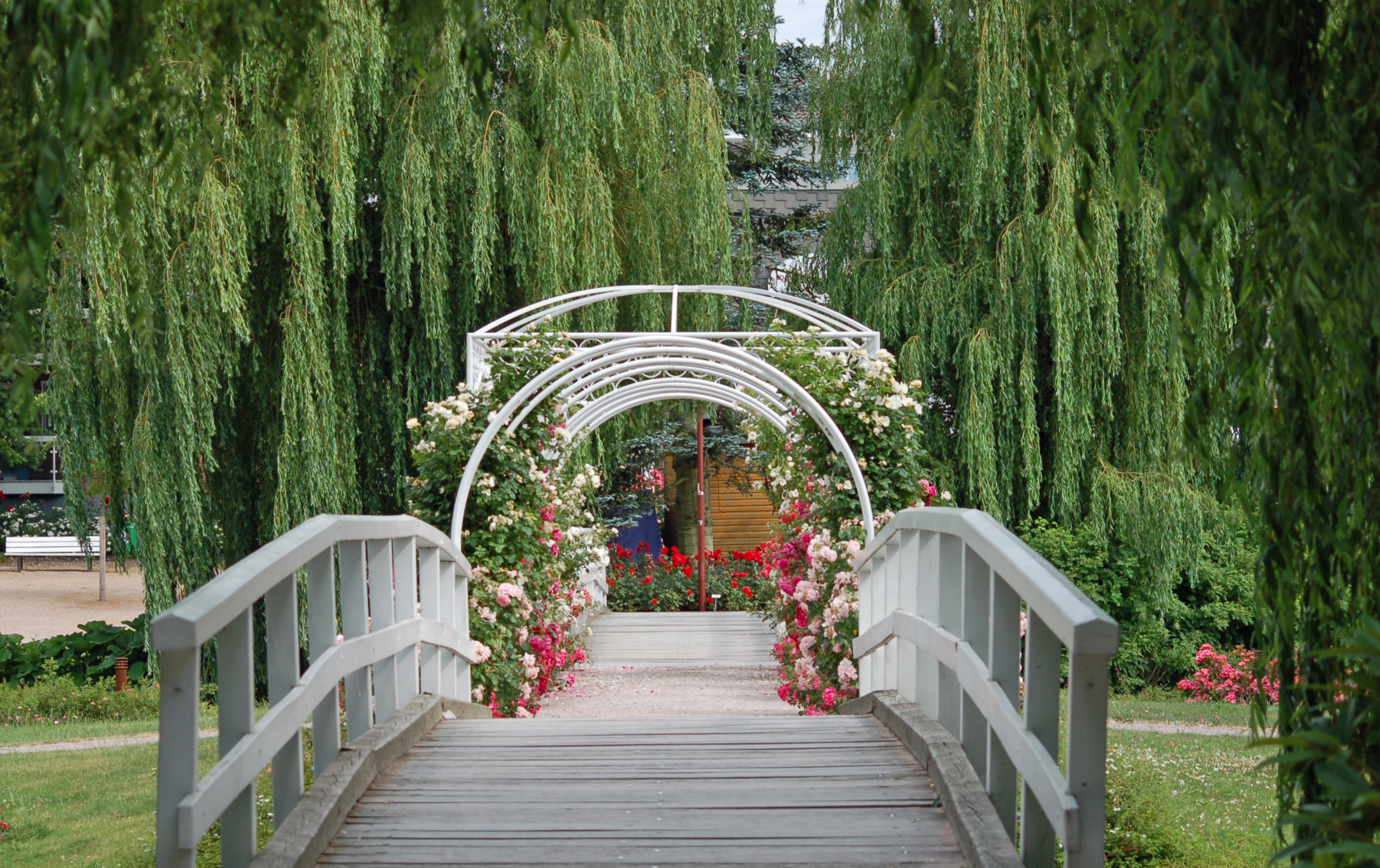
Bridge to the Hochzeitsinsel

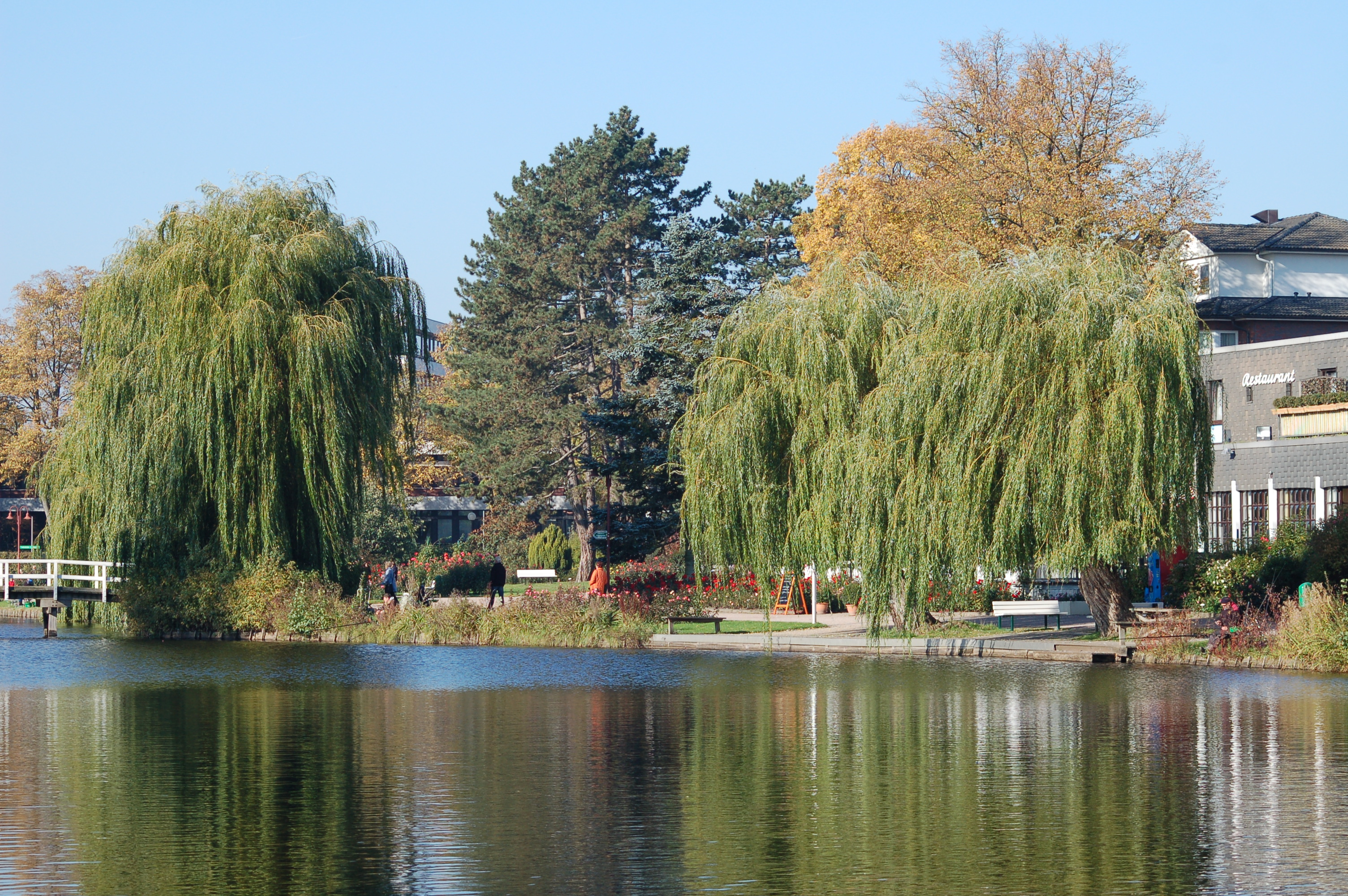
Pond

== Literature ==
- Hanny Tantau, Hans-Peter Mühlbach (dt) und Carol Jesse (en) (Hrsg.): Rosarium Uetersen - Die ganze Rosenvielfalt in Wort und Bild
  Heide: Boyens Buchverlag 2009, ISBN 978-3-8042-1279-4
