= Ludwig Meyn =

German agricultural scientist, soil scientist, geologist, journalist and mineralogist

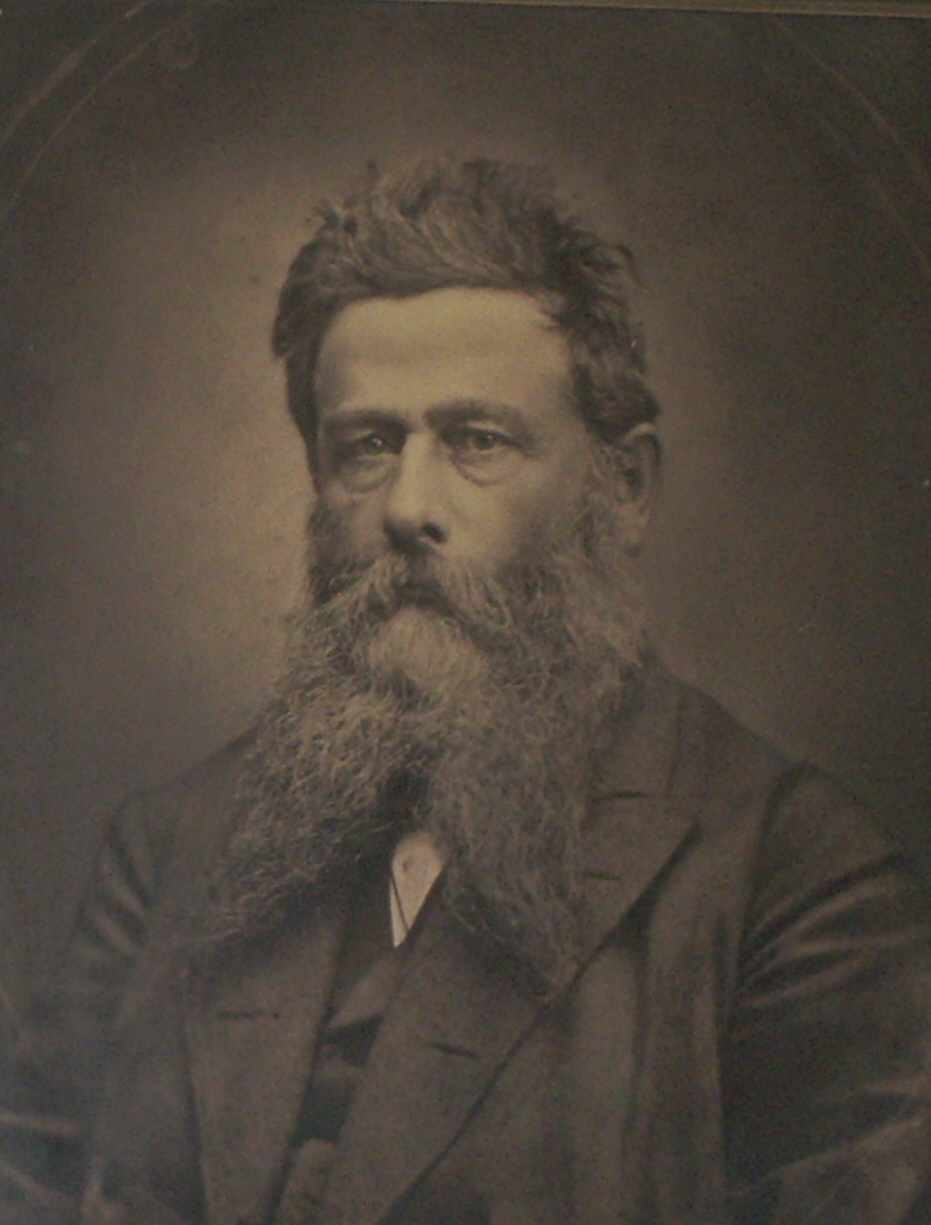
Ludwig Meyn. He was called Dr. Weisheit (Dr. Wisdom) by his friends.

Ludwig Meyn (1 October 1820, Pinneberg − 4 November 1878, Uetersen), was a German agricultural scientist, soil scientist, geologist, journalist and mineralogist. He was the pioneer of oil production.

== Life ==
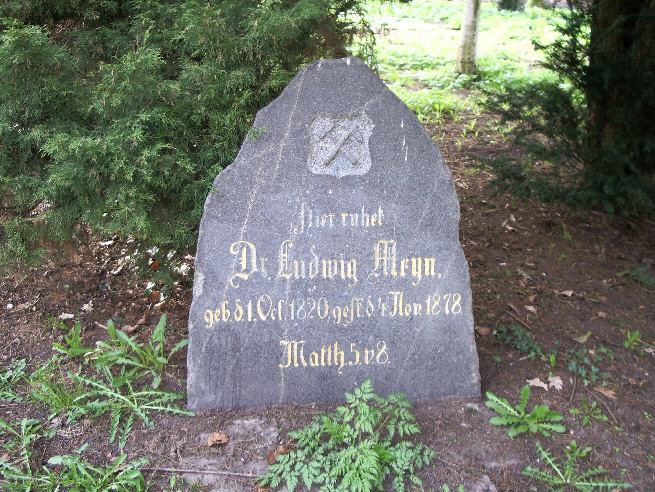
Meyn's headstone in Uetersen

Meyn was born in Pinneberg, Duchy of Holstein, the son of Adolf Meyn, general practitioner and later professor and director of the Clinical Institute of the University of Kiel and attended the public school in Pinneberg from 1826. After the move to Kiel in 1840, he started a degree in natural sciences in Berlin, where he also assisted the chemist Richard Felix Marchand. As a private instructor for rock and soil science, he taught at the Christian-Albrechts University in Kiel, while also working as a teacher of natural sciences at Kiel High School. There he promoted natural and local history.

The exploration of the underlying geological structure in his home country and dissemination of research results was his goal. He taught his students the importance of agricultural chemistry, founded by Justus von Liebig. His approach was to demonstrate to the generally sceptical farmers the need to enrich the soil through deliberate artificial fertilizers to restore nutrients withdrawn by the growing of crops. Meyn lived mainly in Uetersen. He was co-founder and financial donor to the Bleeker-Stift hospital in Uetersen. On 4 November 1878 he died of a stroke he suffered on a business trip to Hamburg.

== His name today ==
In his honor, Uetersen named a school after him (Ludwig-Meyn-Gymnasium). In 1952, the journal "Meyniana" of the Geological-Palaeontological Institute in Kiel was named after him. Also bearing his name is Ludewig-Meyn-Straße, a street on the campus of the Christian-Albrechts University, Kiel, where the Department of Geology is located. Streets are also named after Meyn in Pinneberg, Halstead and Uetersen.

== Geological work ==
From 1846 he studied the production of indigenous raw materials such as gypsum and lime in the Segeberger Kalkberg and Lieth. Meyn simultaneously collected over 1500 rock samples from all over Schleswig-Holstein as specimens, these still form the foundation of the Geological Collection of the state university. In the spring of 1856, Meyn began with simple hand tools, the first drilling for oil in Dithmarschen, three years before Edwin L. Drake, tapped the first oil well in Pennsylvania. It was the first ever drilling for oil, but without much success: Meyn found only bituminous sands and oil pastels. The Danish king later granted him the exploitation rights for the bituminous sands, which produced from 1858 bitumen, axle grease and petroleum.

In the years 1875−76 he was lead geologist for the exploratory mudflat silt drilling for the construction of the Hindenburgdamm. Planned to start as early as 1913 on the basis of Meyn's positive findings, construction on the project was delayed though war and other setbacks until 1923.

== Agricultural science ==
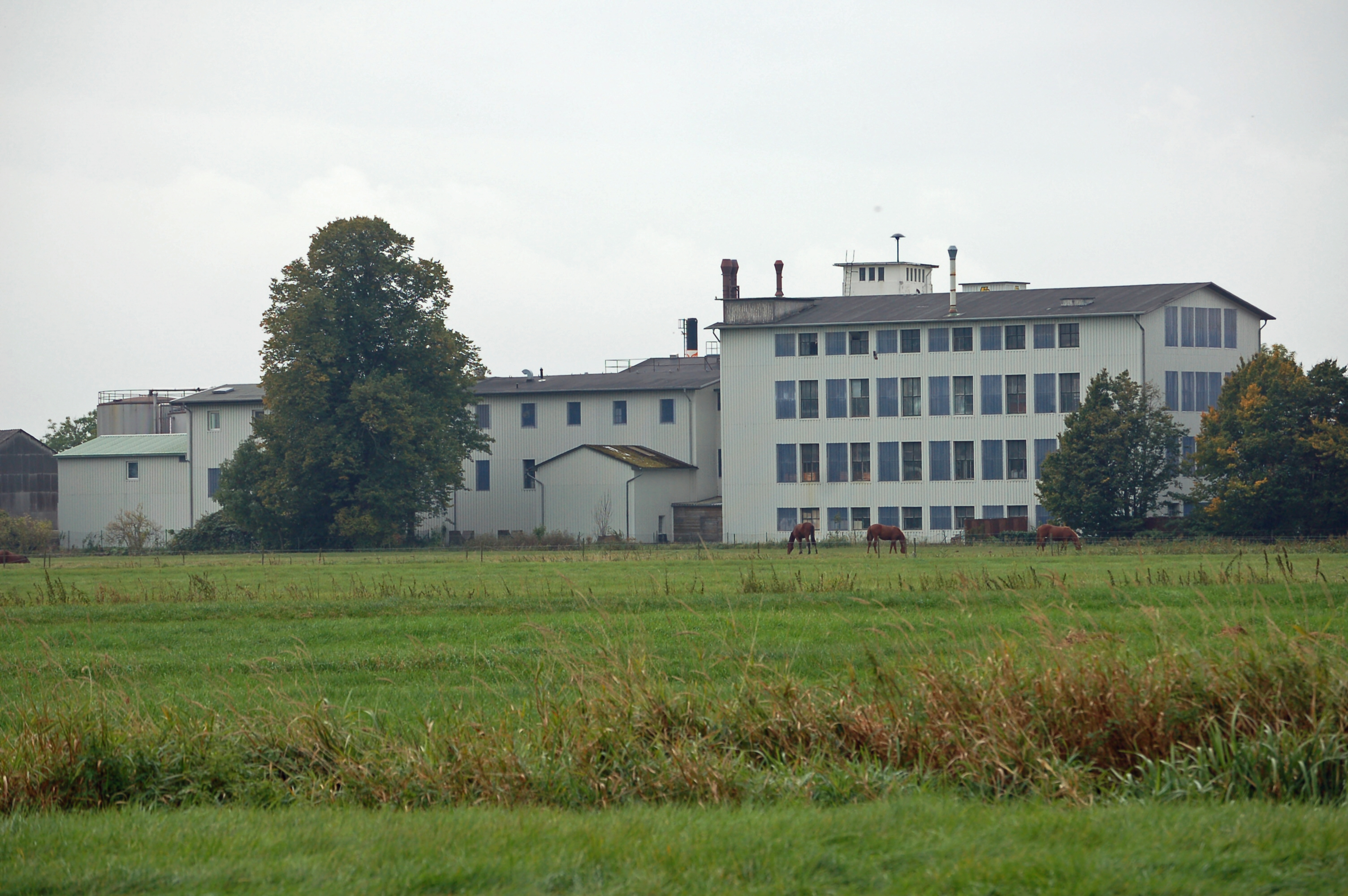
The factory in Uetersen.

Beginning in 1854, Meyn founded a factory for building and fertilizers in an old sawmill in Uetersen. After a fire resulting from an explosion at the end of 1860 the sawmill and the lime production was abandoned. He later formed it into a factory for chemical fertilizers. Through his factory, he wanted to bring to fruition the ideas of Justus von Liebig. He particularly pointed to the use of bone meal produced by him. It was an organic fertilizer rich in lime, nitrogen and phosphoric acid.

== Journalism and poetry ==
In 1854, he started as an employee at the Itzehoer Nachrichten publishing company. There, he shared his expertise on home soil types, animal and plant sciences, and the use of artificial fertilizers with the public.

As a poet, he produced various poems in 1843 during his student days. In 1865 he published a dramatic piece, A Five Hour Adventure, under a British proposal. Another publication was My Uncle, the Mayor.
