= Kurt Roth =

German painter

Kurt Roth (1899 – 30 October 1975) was a German painter.

== Life ==
He was born in 1899 in Ratingen near Düsseldorf. 1920 he and his father, the painter Ludwig Max Roth, moved to Uetersen, where they lived at the monastery Uetersen in very modest circumstances. He received his training as an artist arts academies in Düsseldorf, Wrocław, Budapest, Copenhagen, and London.

Kurt Roth, also known to the Hamburg society as a portrait painter painted his pictures in oil, preferably depicting motives of his home region Holstein, especially of the Old Town of Uetersen, where he lived.

Roth was a great admirer of Adolph Menzel, saying: "He devoted his whole life to the drawing. He was only able to do it because of constant exercises. Talent only is a foundation." This was also true of Kurt Roth.

He spent his last years in bitter poverty. Sometimes the way former mayor of Uetersen Heinrich Wilkens was his only customer, buying the pictures because "You cannot let the poor monastery painter starve to death." and having them on display in public buildings and schools. Shortly before his death, the painter reviewed his life and stated: "Today I am poor. It might have been better if I had become an art teacher after studying. But life is over now".

On 30 October 1975, Kurt Roth died lonely and abandoned in his small attic flat in Uetersen.

Today, the museum of local history of Uetersen keeps alive the memory of the "poor monastery painter", devoting a large exhibition to him and his works.
