= Augusta Louise zu Stolberg-Stolberg =

German baroness (1753–1835)

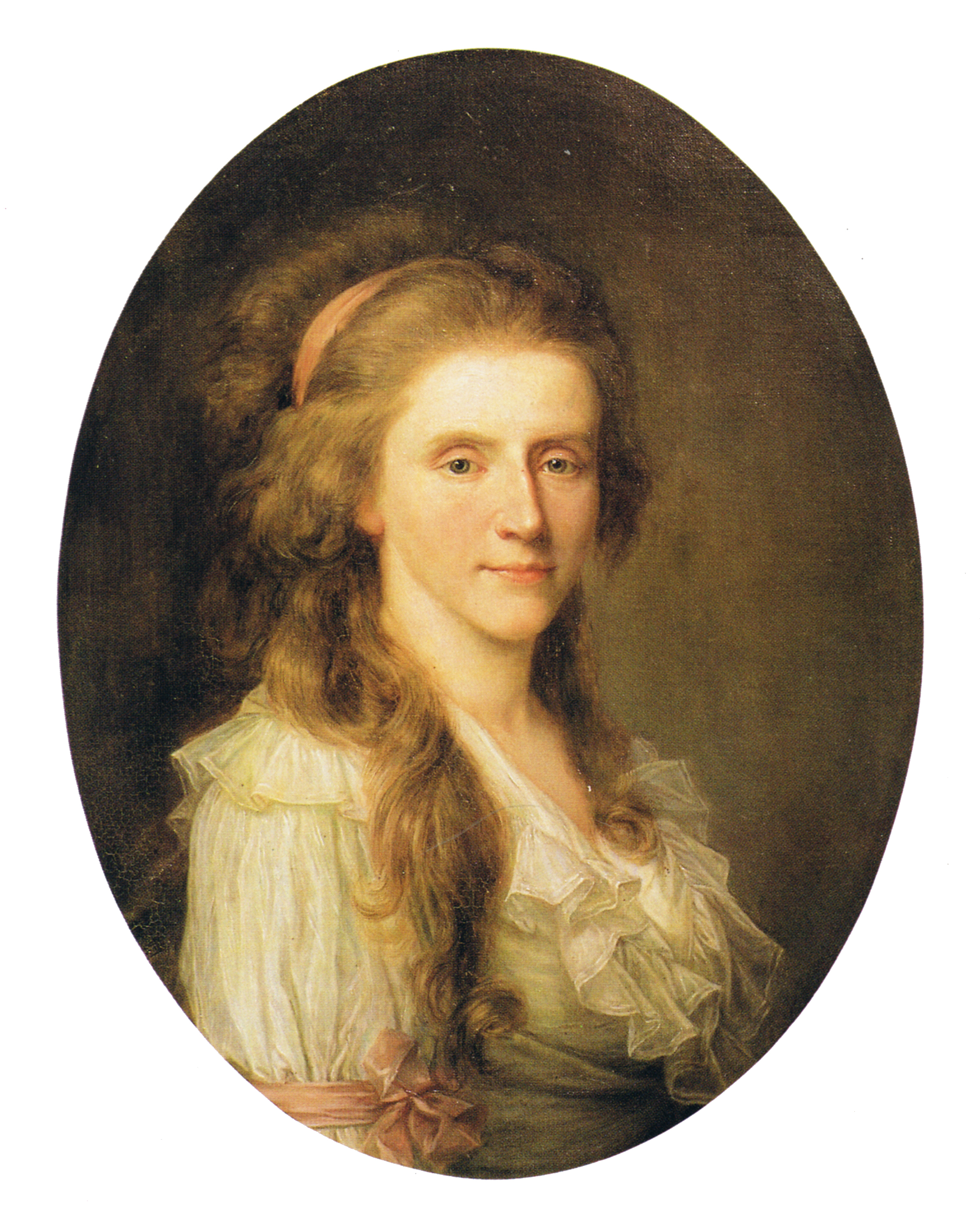
Augusta Louise zu Stolberg-Stolberg

Countess Louise Augusta zu Stolberg-Stolberg (7 January 1753 in Bramstedt, Duchy of Holstein – 30 May 1835 in Kiel) was a German noble who was known for her lively correspondence with the poet and thinker Johann Wolfgang von Goethe; she is known as Goethes Gustchen in the history of literature. By birth she was member of the House of Stolberg and by marriage member of House of Bernstorff.

== Early life ==
She was daughter of Count Christian Günther zu Stolberg-Stolberg (1714–1765) and Countess Christiane Charlotte zu Castell-Remlingen (1722–1773). She was younger sister of Goethe's friends Count Friedrich Leopold zu Stolberg-Stolberg ("Fritz") and Count Christian zu Stolberg-Stolberg.

== Later life ==
She lived in a pension for young, unmarried noble girls from 1770 to 1783 along with the older Baroness Metta von Oberg. Her letters to the young Goethe date to 1775 and 1776. They never met in person.

In all her correspondence she was a lively writer. "Augusta – vom Morgen bis in Abend laufen die Depeschen bey ihr ein, wie bey einem Staatsminister, und werden sorgfältiger abgefertigt, als in einer Canzelley" noted Friedrich Gottlieb Klopstock.

== Marriage ==
On 7 August 1783 Augusta Louise moved to Copenhagen, and later married the Danish Minister of State Count Andreas Peter von Bernstorff. They had no issue.

== Sources ==
- Plath-Langheinrich, Elsa: Als Goethe nach Uetersen schrieb: Das Leben der Conventualin Augusta Louise Gräfin zu Stolberg-Stolberg. ISBN 3-529-02695-6 (de)
- Koopmann, Helmut: Goethe und Frau von Stein. ISBN 3-423-34082-7 (de)
- Goethe an Auguste Gräfin zu Stolberg, [Frankfurt, January 18.- 30. 1775]. (de)
