= Friedrich Leopold zu Stolberg-Stolberg =

German lawyer and translator (1750–1819)

Friedrich Leopold Stolberg
- Friedrich Leopold zu Stolberg-Stolberg
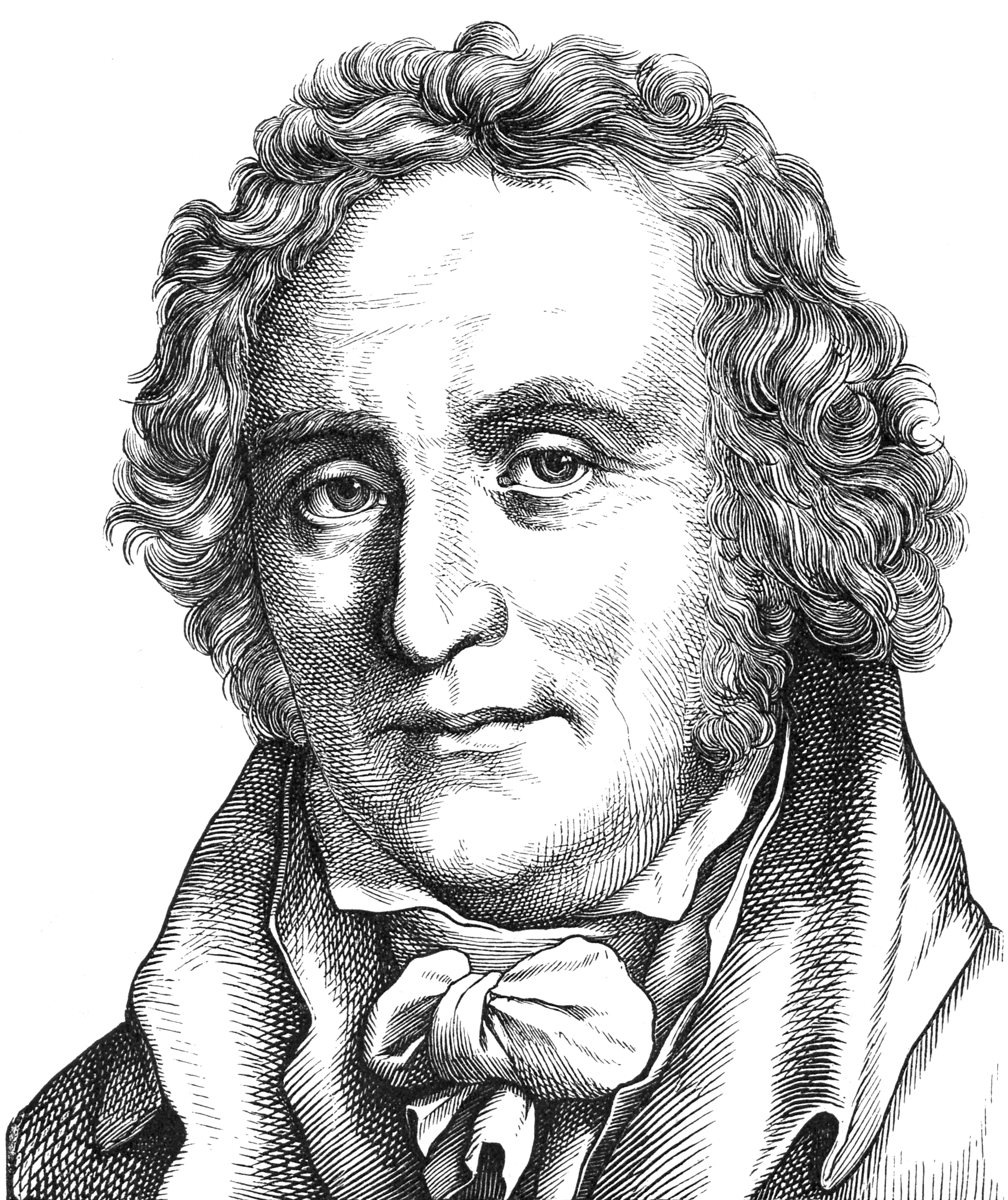
- Born: November 7, 1750; Bad Bramstedt, Duchy of Holstein
- Died: December 5, 1819 (aged 69); Sondermühlen, near Melle, Kingdom of Hanover
- Relatives: Catharine Stolberg (sister); Christian of Stolberg-Stolberg (brother)

Friedrich Leopold Graf zu Stolberg-Stolberg (7 November 1750 – 5 December 1819) was a German lawyer, and translator. He was also a poet of the Sturm und Drang and early Romantic periods.

== Life ==
Friedrich Leopold was born 7 November 1750 in Bramstedt within the Duchy of Holstein, which was then a part of Denmark. Through his mother, Christiane C. F. Castell-Remlingen (1722–1773), and father, Christian Günther Stolberg (1714–1765), he belonged to a cadet branch of the Stolberg family. He was one of 12 children, and was the brother of Christian Stolberg and Catharine Stolberg. His father was a danish magistrate and the owner of a manorial estate. A few years after his birth the family moved to Copenhagen, where he soon formed friendships with distinguished literary men. Friedrich Gottlieb Klopstock, in particular, became a mentor to Stolberg and his brothers after the death of their father in 1765.

Together with his elder brother Christian, Friedrich Leopold went to the University of Halle in 1770, in order to study German Law. His other studies embraced the Classics and various historical courses. The two brothers then studied in Göttingen and were a prominent members of the Göttinger Hainbund, a literary society of young men who had high aspirations for the unity of the country, and who cultivated German poetry. After leaving the university, in 1775 the brothers made a journey to Switzerland in company with the famed poet Johann Wolfgang von Goethe.

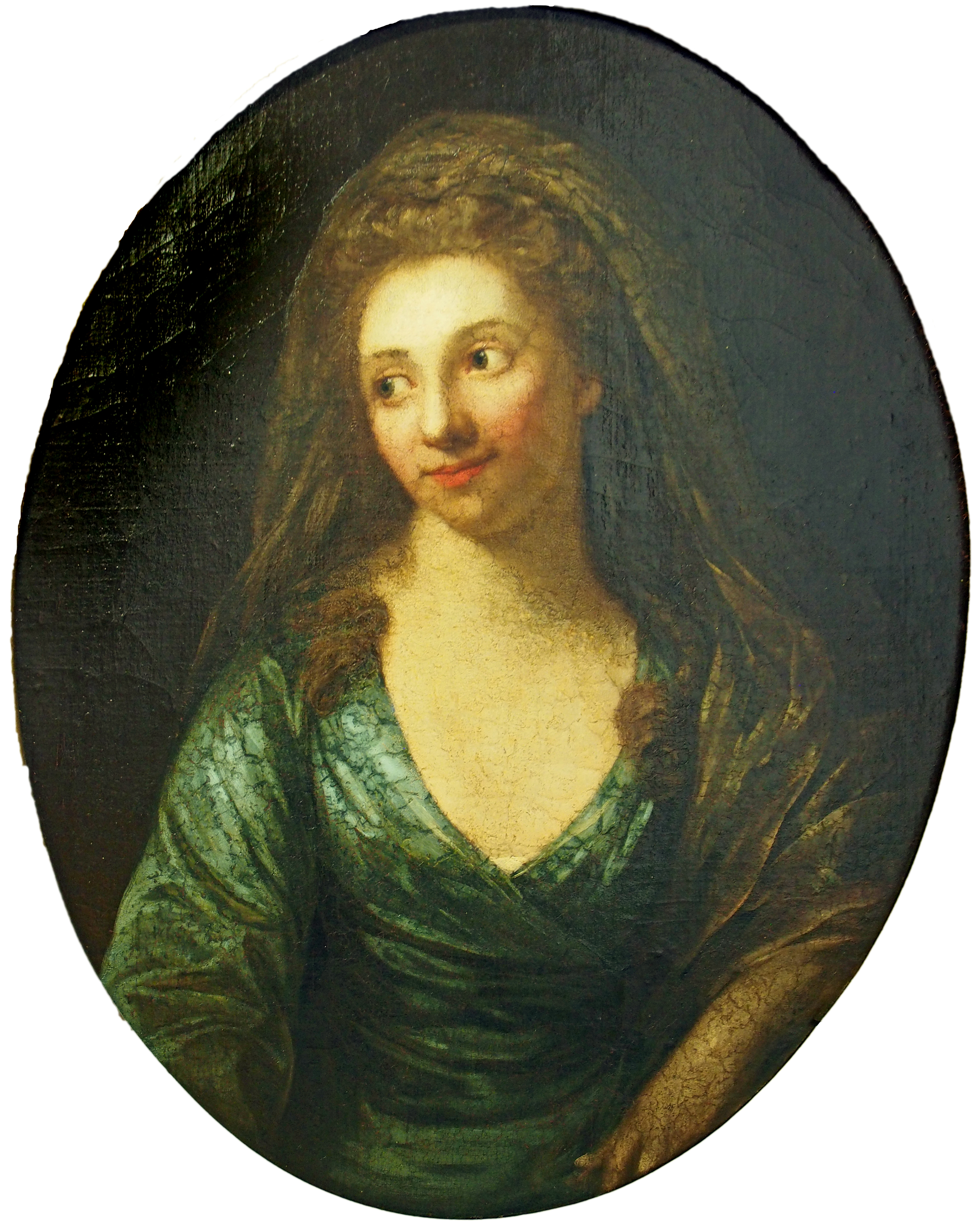
Henriette Eleonore Agnes, Stolberg's first wife (portrait by Anton Graff, 1785)

In 1777 Friedrich Leopold was appointed envoy of the prince bishop of Lübeck at the Court of Copenhagen, but often stayed at Eutin to spend time with his college friend and member of the Dichterbund, Johann Heinrich Voss. In 1781, he was chief administrator at Eutin.

In 1782 Stolberg married Henriette Eleonore Agnes von Witzleben (1761–1788), whom he celebrated in his poems. The couple had two sons and two daughters. After six years of happy married life, Agnes died in 1788.

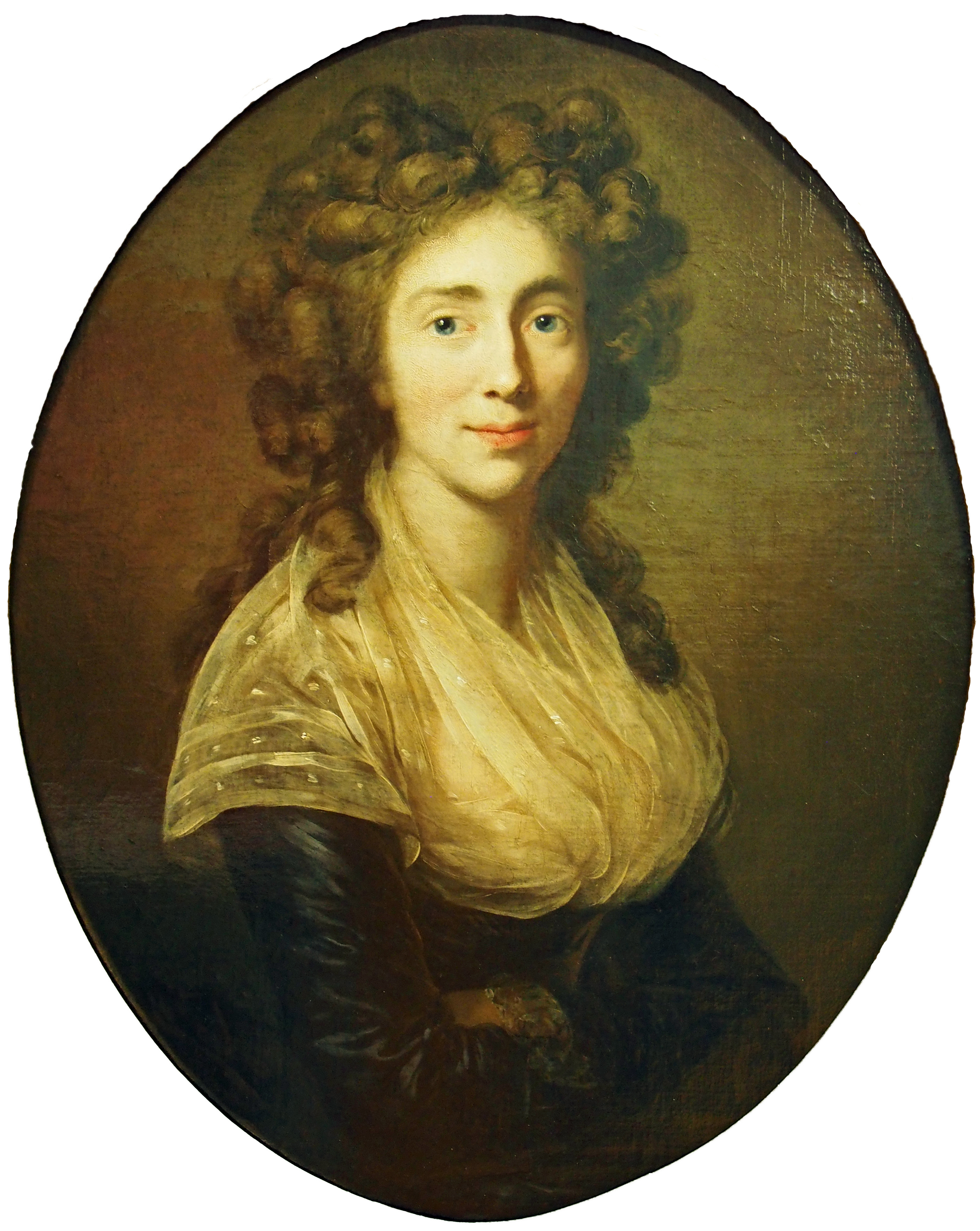
Sophie Charlotte Eleonore, Stolberg's second wife (portrait by Anton Graff, 1789/1792)

Friedrich Leopold then became Danish envoy to the Court of Prussia, and married Countess Sophie Charlotte Eleonore von Redern (1765–1842) in 1789. After their wedding he and his wife took a grand tour through Germany, Switzerland, and Italy; he documented this trip in a series of letters, Travels through Germany, Switzerland, Italy and Sicily.

This tour was of great importance for his religious development, as he then made the acquaintance of the devout Catholic Freiherr von Droste-Vischering, as well as of Droste-Vischering's resident tutor, the distinguished theologian Katerkamp. In 1791 he was appointed president of the Lübeck episcopal court at Eutin. In June, 1800, he joined the Catholic Church in the private chapel of the Princess Gallitzin at Osnabrück, and on 22 August he resigned his various positions, retiring to Münster in Westphalia. He was active in a group of Westphalian Catholics working to develop Romanticism.

By his second marriage Stolberg had a large family, of which all, with the exception of the oldest daughter, followed their father's example and joined the Catholic Church in 1801. His eldest daughter, Marie Agnes, was betrothed to the Lutheran Count Ferdinand of Stolberg-Wernigerode, son of Christian Frederick of Stolberg-Wernigerode. Four of his sons and two of his sons-in-law took part in the campaign against France in 1814; one of which was killed at the Battle of Ligny in 1815. For his conversion to Catholicism, Friedrich Leopold was severely attacked by his former friend Voss (Wie ward Fritz Stolberg zum Unfreien?, 1819). After living for a while (from 1812) in the neighbourhood of Bielefeld, he removed to his estate of Schloss Sondermühlen (now part of Melle) near Osnabrück, where he remained until his death in 1819.

== Authorship ==
In his student days, Stolberg was a member of the Göttinger Hainbund within the Sturm und Drang movement. His poetry was said to have a "pastoral, idyllic quality that ties his work to the Romantics."

Friedrich Leopold wrote many odes, ballads, satires and dramas: among them the tragedy Timoleon (1784). He produced translations of the Iliad (1778), of Plato (1796–1797), Aeschylus (1802), and Ossian (1806); he published in 1815 a Leben Alfreds des Grossen, and a 17 volume work Geschichte der Religion Jesu Christi (1806–1818). Other works include poetry, including Ballads (1779) and Iambics (1784); other works, such as Plays (1787) and Travels (1791); and novels, such as The Island (1788). He also wrote a history of Alfred the Great (1816), a life of St. Vincent de Paul, translated passages from the works of St. Augustine, and wrote meditations on the Holy Scriptures. These meditations however, together with the Büchlein der Liebe, and the polemical pamphlet Kurze Abfertigung des langen Schmähschrifts des Hofrats Voss, did not appear until after his death.

Several of his poems were set to music by the Austrian composer Franz Schubert, and one poem was set to music by the Swedish composer Joseph Martin Kraus.

== Works ==
The Collected Works of Christian and Friedrich Leopold zu Stolberg were published in twenty volumes in 1820–1825. Friedrich's correspondence with FH Jacobi can be found in Jacobi's Briefwechsel (1825–1827).

Selections from the poetry of him and his brother Christian will be found in August Sauer's Der Göttinger Dichterbund, iii. (Kürschner's Deutsche Nationalliteratur, vol. 50, 1896). See also:

- Theodor Menge, Der Graf F. L. Stolberg and seine Zeitgenossen (2 vols, 1862)
- JH Hennes, Aus F. L. von Stolbergs Jugendjahren (1876)
- the same, Stolberg in den zwei letzten Jahrzehnten seines Lebens (1875)
- Johannes Janssen, F. L. Graf zu Stolberg (2 vols, 1877), 2nd ed. 1882
- Wilhelm Keiper, F. L. Stolbergs Jugendpoesie (1893).
