= Christian of Stolberg-Stolberg =

German poet

- Christian Graf zu Stolberg-Stolberg
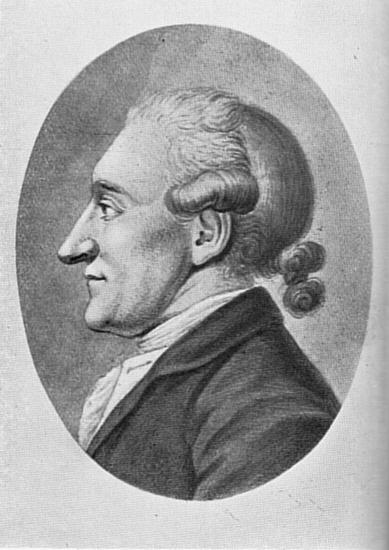
- Engraving of Christian Stolberg by Johann Heinrich Lips
- Born: October 15, 1748; Hamburg, Holy Roman Empire
- Died: January 18, 1821 (aged 72); Windeby, Duchy of Schleswig
- Relatives: Friedrich Leopold zu Stolberg-Stolberg (brother); Catharine Stolberg (sister)

Christian Graf zu Stolberg-Stolberg (15 October 1748, Hamburg – 18 January 1821, Windeby) was a poet, and brother of Frederick Leopold and Catharine Stolberg.

He received an honorary doctorate from the Kiel University in 1815, was appointed a chamberlain in 1774, and made a Geheimrat in 1808.

== Career ==
In 1770, Stolberg began to study law at the Martin Luther University Halle-Wittenberg along with his younger brother Frederick Leopold. Both brothers then continued their studies in Göttingen in 1772. They returned to Copenhagen with their mother in 1773. In 1775, they traveled through Germany and Switzerland together with Johann Wolfgang von Goethe before again returning to Copenhagen. He became a magistrate at Tremsbüttel in Holstein in 1777.

He and his brother Frederick Leopold we frequent collaborators as poets. Of the two brothers, Frederick was undoubtedly the more talented, and though Christian was not a highly original poet, he excelled in expressing gentle sentiments. In 1779, they published a volume of poems together, Gedichte, which was edited by H. C. Boie. They later published Schauspiele mit Chören (1787), intending to revive a love for the Greek drama, and a collection of patriotic poems, Vaterländische Gedichte (1815).

He independently authored Gedichte aus dem Griechischen (1782), a translation of the works of Sophocles (1787), Die weisse Frau (1814), and of a poem in seven ballads, which attained considerable popularity. He lived a relatively secluded life, but remained in close contact with his brother. His last publication was a short biography of his brother, who died two years before him.

== Personal life ==
Stolberg was born in Hamburg on 15 October 1748 to Christian Günther Stolberg (1714–1765) and Christiane C.F. Castell-Remlingen (1722–1773). After his father entered into the service of the Queen Dowager Sophie Magdalene of Brandenburg-Kulmbach in 1756, the family moved to Copenhagen. He grew up between Rungstedgård and the queen's residence, Hirschholm Palace. The family was particularly pious. After his father's death in 1765, he and his brothers were mentored by Friedrich Gottlieb Klopstock.

On 15 June 1777, he married Louise Stolberg in Copenhagen. He died on 18 January 1821 in Windeby.
