= Osterau (Bramau) =

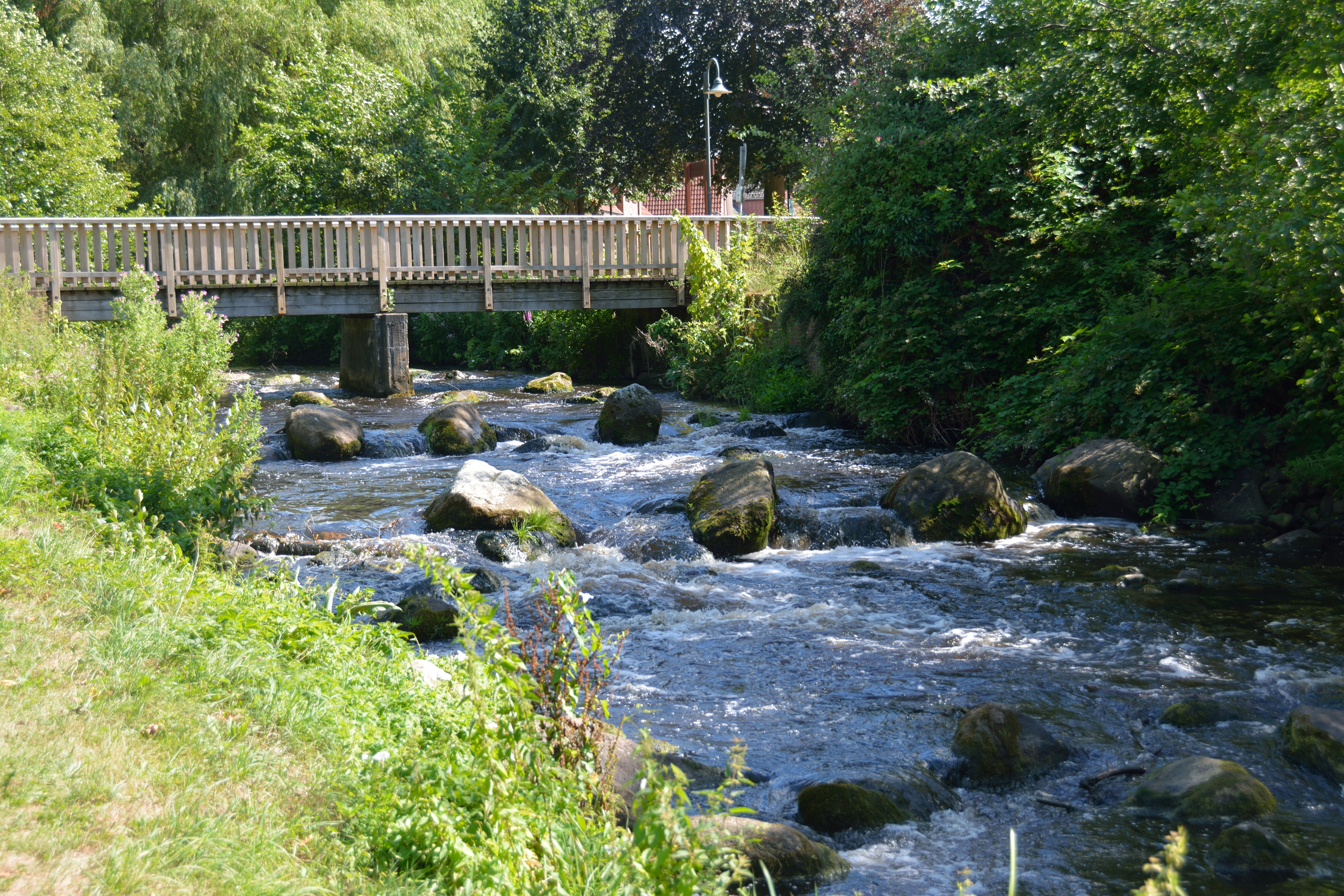

Location
- Country: Germany
- States: Schleswig-Holstein

Physical characteristics
- Mouth
  - location: Bramau
  - coordinates: 53.9187°N 9.8792°E

Basin features
- Progression: Bramau→ Stör→ Elbe→ North Sea

Osterau is a tributary river of the Bramau in Schleswig-Holstein, Germany.

== See also ==
- List of rivers of Schleswig-Holstein
