= Bad Bramstedt =

- Town
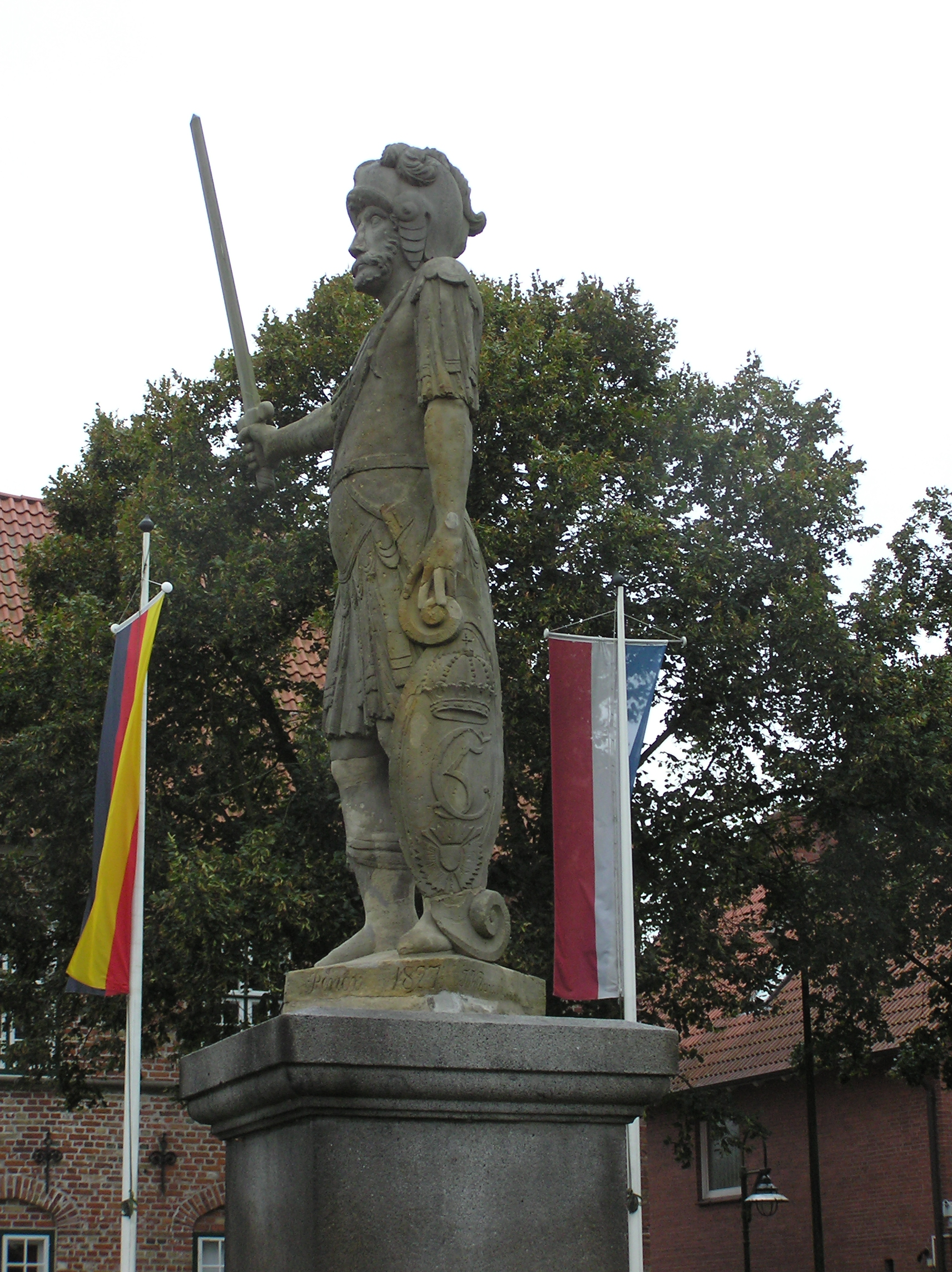
- Roland statue in Bad Bramstedt

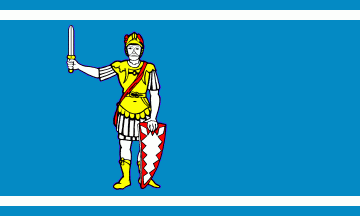
- Flag Coat of arms

- Location of Bad Bramstedt within Segeberg district
- Interactive map of Bad Bramstedt
- Location within Germany Location within Schleswig-Holstein
- Coordinates: 53°55′7″N 9°53′4″E
- Country: Germany
- State: Schleswig-Holstein
- District: Segeberg

Government
  - Mayor: Felix Carl

Area
  - Total: 24.14 km^{2} (9.32 sq mi)
- Elevation: 9 m (30 ft)

Population (2025-12-31)
  - Total: 15,363
  - Density: 636.4/km^{2} (1,648/sq mi)
- Time zone: UTC+01:00 (CET)
  - Summer (DST): UTC+02:00 (CEST)
- Postal codes: 24576
- Dialling codes: 04192
- Vehicle registration: SE
- Website: www.bad-bramstedt.de

Bad Bramstedt (German: [baːt ˈbʁaːmʃtɛt]) is a municipality in the district of Segeberg, in Schleswig-Holstein, Germany. It is situated approximately 40 km north of Hamburg. It is famous for its statue of Roland and its rheumatism clinic.

== Geography and transport ==
Bad Bramstedt lies 49 kilometers southwest of Kiel, 54 kilometers west of Lübeck, and 40 kilometers north of Hamburg on the historical Ox Road. The Altona-Kieler Chaussee (L318/L319) passes through the town. This about 94 kilometer-long Landstraße (state road) was built between 1830 and 1832. The confluence of the Osterau and Hudau rivers, which come together to form the Bramau, is found in Bad Bramstedt.

== Notable residents ==
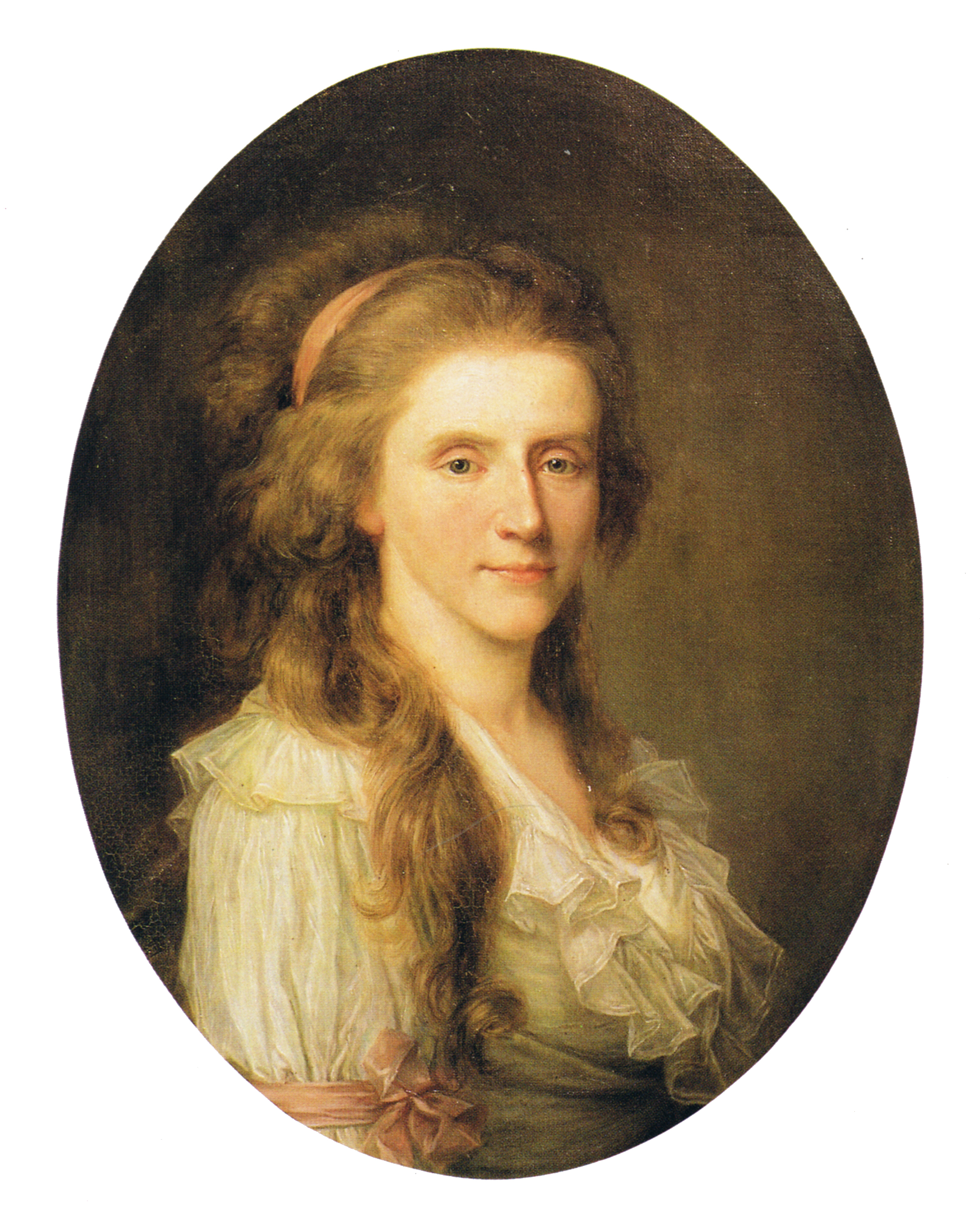
Augusta Louise zu Stolberg-Stolberg

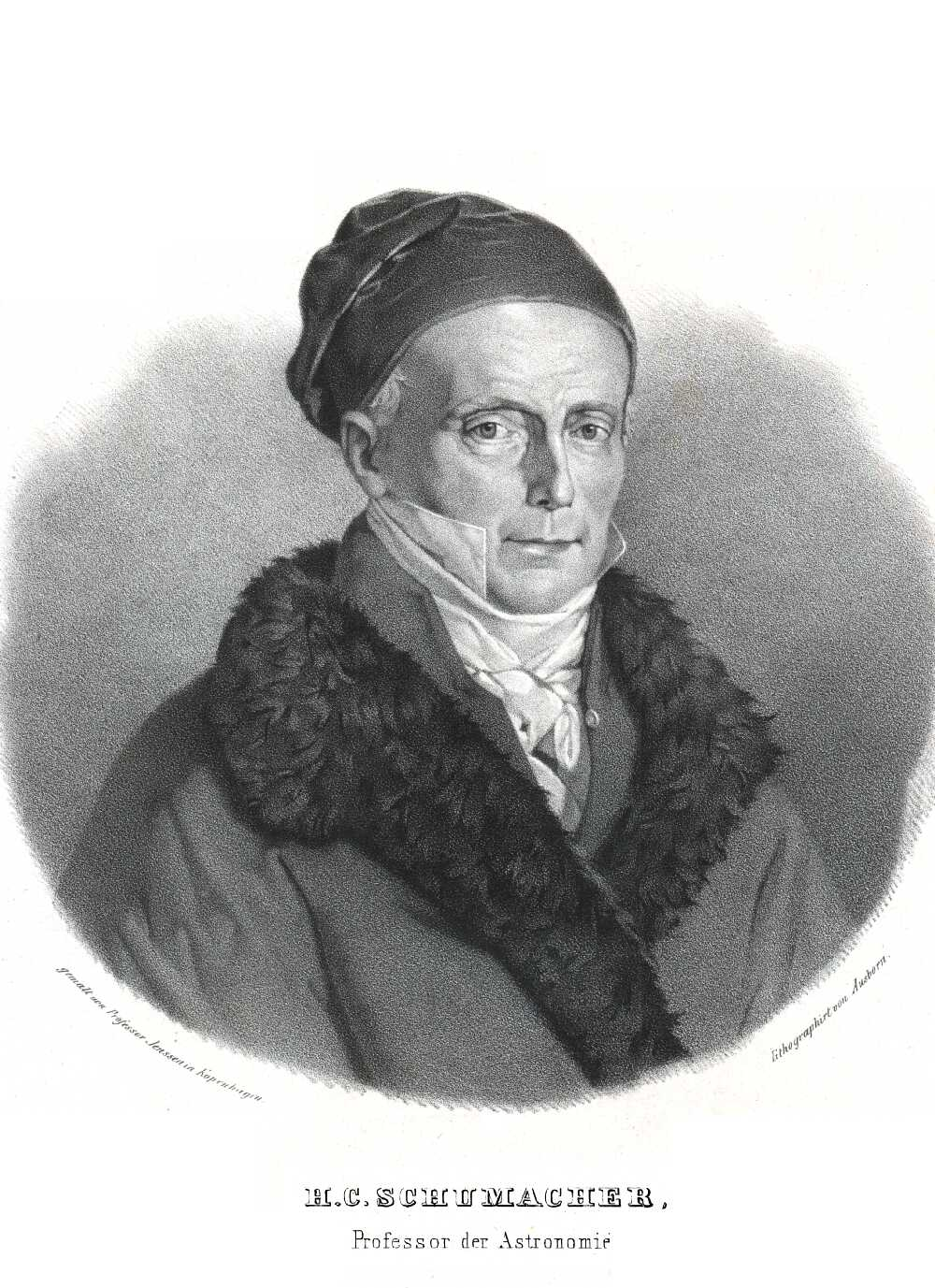
Heinrich Christian Schumacher

- Oskar Alexander (1881–1942), founder of the rheumatism clinic in Bad Bramstedt. Murdered in Sachsenhausen concentration camp for being of Jewish descent.
- Fabian Boll (born 1979), footballer, played 273 pro games and senior police official
- William Crane (1902–1979), surgeon general of the Bundeswehr; died in Bad Bramstedt
- Arved Fuchs, (born 1953), arctic adventurer
- Rolf Koschorrek (1956-2020), German politician (CDU)
- Karl Lagerfeld (1933–2019), fashion designer, born in Hamburg, went to school in Bad Bramstedt.
- Siegfried Liebschner, (DE Wiki) (1935–2006), Baptist theologian, born in Bad Bramstedt
- Charles I.D. Looff (1852–1918), master carver; "father" of the amusement parks in America, built many roundabouts
- Johanna Mestorf (1828–1909), first female museum director in Germany and first woman in Prussia to hold the title of professor
- Heinrich Christian Schumacher (1780–1850), German-Danish astronomer and mathematician.
- Augusta Louise zu Stolberg-Stolberg (1753–1835), corresponded with Goethe as Gustchen
- Friedrich Leopold zu Stolberg-Stolberg (1750–1819), poet, lawyer and translator
- Kurt Gustav Wilckens (1886–1923), militant German anarchist in South America
