= Bramau =

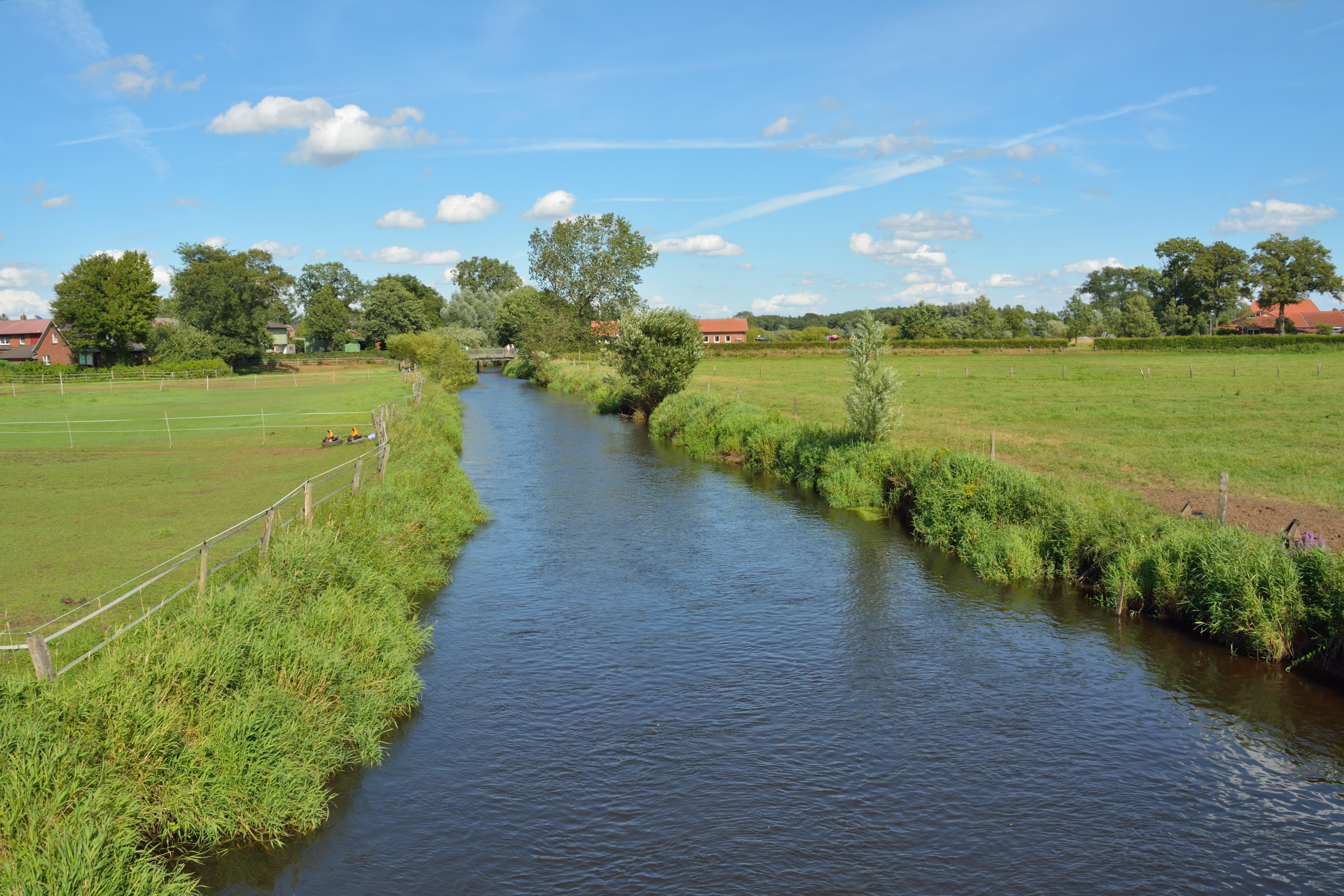

Location
- Country: Germany
- State: Schleswig-Holstein
- Reference no.: 59766

Physical characteristics
- Source
  - location: Start: Confluence of the Osterau and Hudau in Bad Bramstedt
  - coordinates: 53°55′08″N 9°52′45″E
- Mouth
  - location: near Wittenbergen into the Stör
  - coordinates: 53°56′09″N 9°41′38″E
- Length: 15.1 km

Basin features
- Progression: Stör→ Elbe→ North Sea

The Bramau is an eastern tributary of the Stör in the German state of Schleswig-Holstein.

The river is 15.1 kilometres (9.4 mi) long and drops 10 metres (33 ft) throughout its length.

It begins in Bad Bramstedt at the confluence of the Osterau and the Hudau, known here as the Schmalfelder Au.

== See also ==
List of rivers of Schleswig-Holstein
