= Hudau =

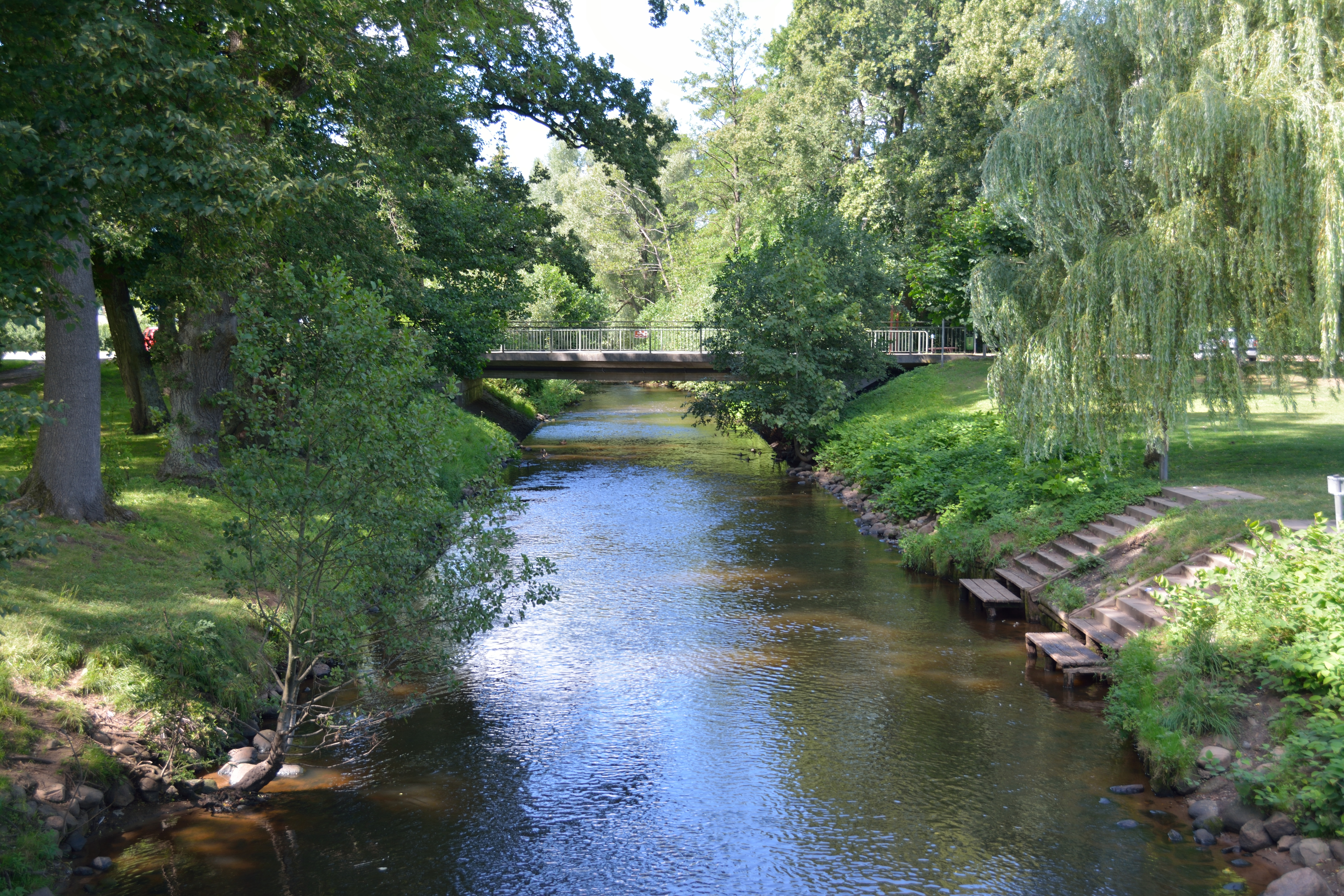

Location
- Country: Germany
- States: Schleswig-Holstein

Physical characteristics
- Mouth
  - location: Bramau
  - coordinates: 53.9187°N 9.8792°E

Basin features
- Progression: Bramau→ Stör→ Elbe→ North Sea

Hudau is a river of Schleswig-Holstein, Germany. It flows into the Bramau in Bad Bramstedt.

== See also ==
- List of rivers of Schleswig-Holstein
