= Arlau =

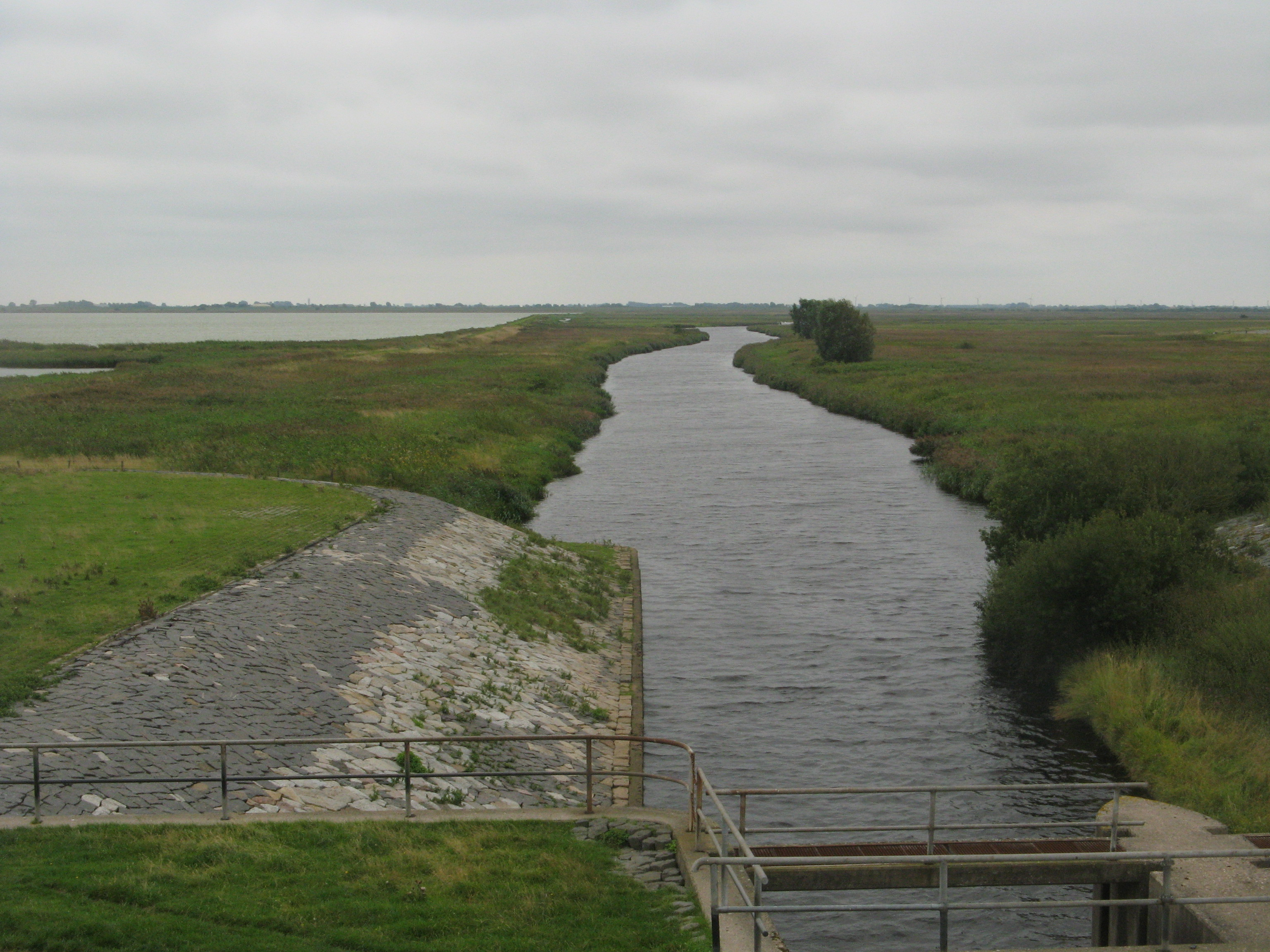
- The Arlau, immediately behind the sluice where it flows into the Beltringharder Koog

Location
- Location: Nordfriesland, Schleswig-Holstein, Germany
- Reference no.: DE: 9552

Physical characteristics
- Source
  - location: southeast of Sollwitt
  - coordinates: 54°34′47″N 9°15′04″E
  - elevation: 8 m
- Mouth
  - location: after crossing the Beltringharder Koog at the Holm Sluice into the North Sea
  - coordinates: 54°31′41″N 8°52′19″E
- Length: 37 km

Basin features
- River system: Arlau
- Landmarks: Villages: Behrendorf, Bondelum, Viöl, Arlewatt, Hattstedtermarsch
- Waterbodies: Reservoirs: Arlau retention basin in the Beltringharder Koog

The Arlau (Danish: Arlå) is a 37-kilometre-long river in the county of Nordfriesland in Schleswig-Holstein, Germany. It flows into the North Sea near Nordstrand and is part of the Eider catchment.

== Course ==
The Arlau rises southeast of Sollwitt in North Frisia. It divides the Goesharde region into North and South Goesharde. Initially it flows a few kilometres south and runs along the municipal boundary of Behrendorf and Bondelum. About 3 km southeast of Behrendorf it changes course and heads in a westerly direction. The Arlau then flows south of Viöl and north of Arlewatt, crosses the Hattstedt Marsh and finally flows into the North Sea at the Beltringharder Koog at the Holm Sluice.

== Tributaries ==
The Arlau is fed by the:

- Gramsholmer Bek
- Imme
- Eckstockau
- Ahrenhöfter Graben
- Ostenau
- Bredstedter Bach
- Jelstrom
- Grenzau

== Gallery ==
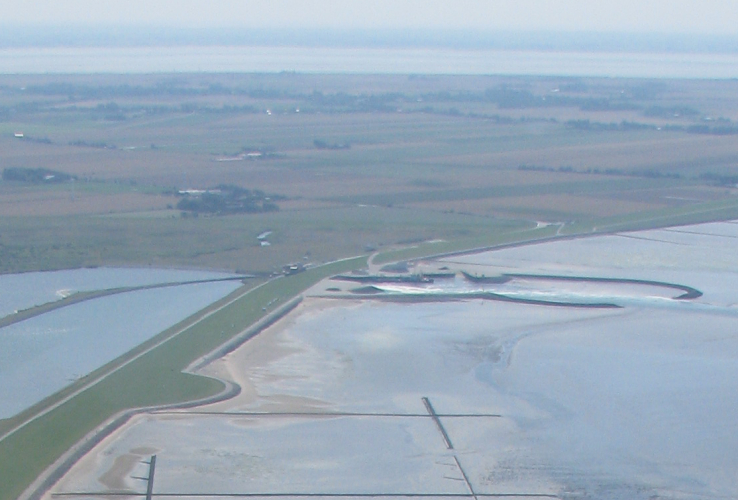
The Holm Sluice (Holmer Siel) at the outer dyke of the Beltringharder Koog

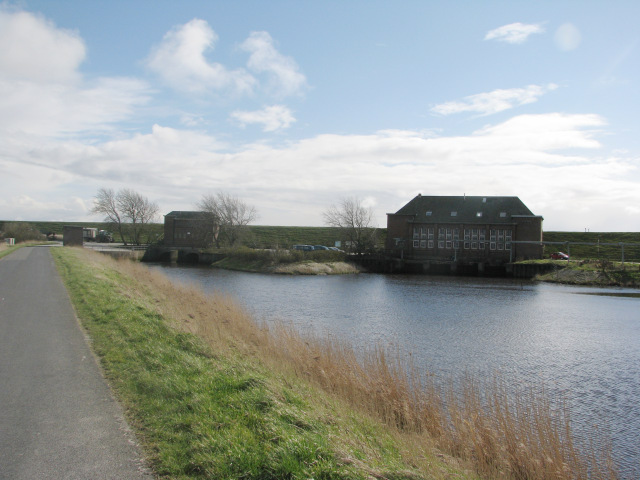
The lock system of the Arlau in the dyke of the New Hattstedt Koog

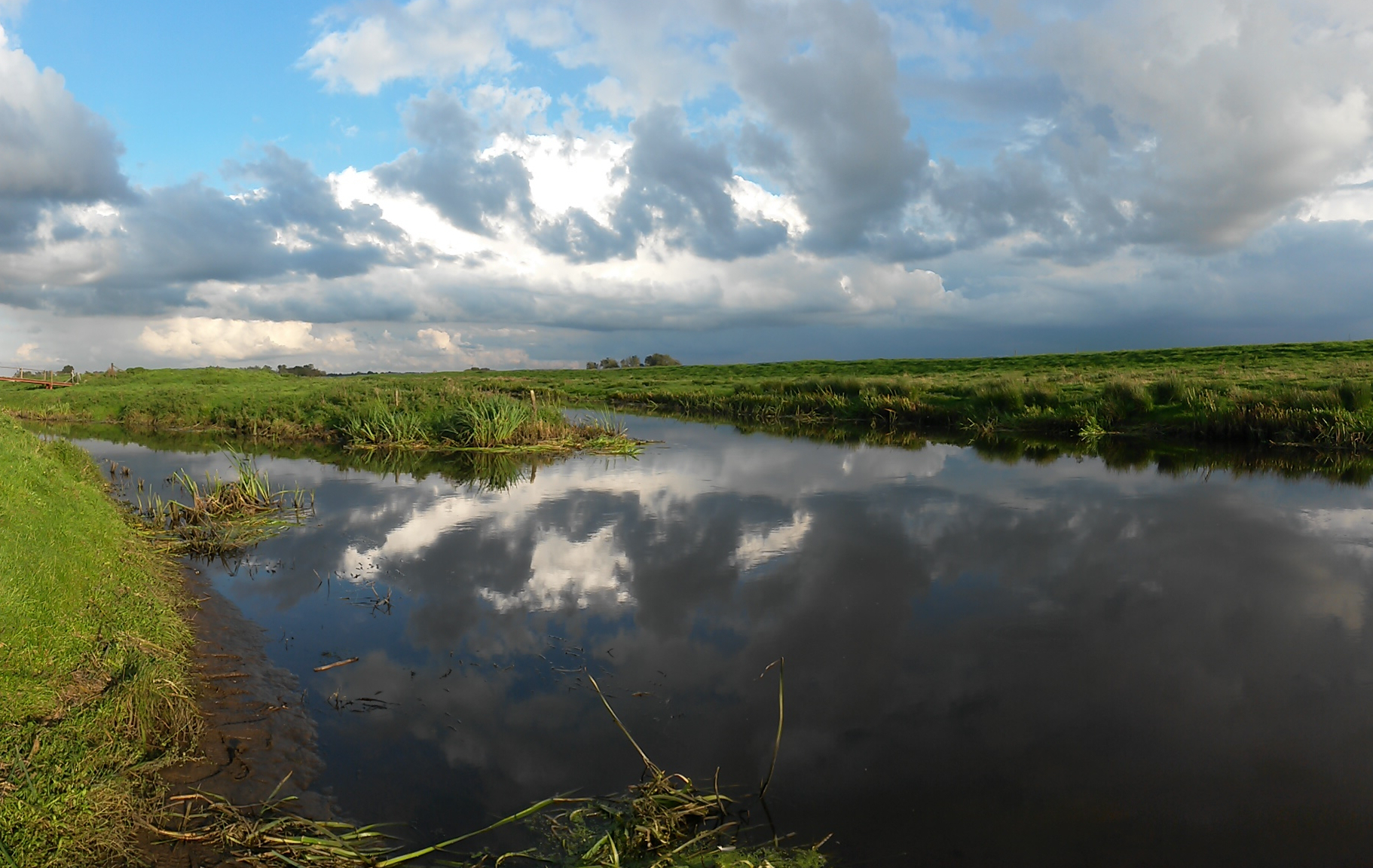
The Arlau at its confluence with the Ostenau (entering from the left)

== See also ==
- List of rivers of Schleswig-Holstein
