= Nail Men =

German World War I propaganda

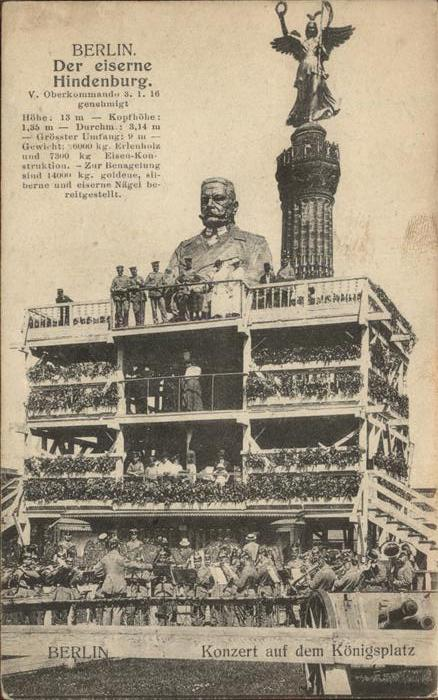
Statue of Hindenburg in front of the Victory Column in Berlin, 1919

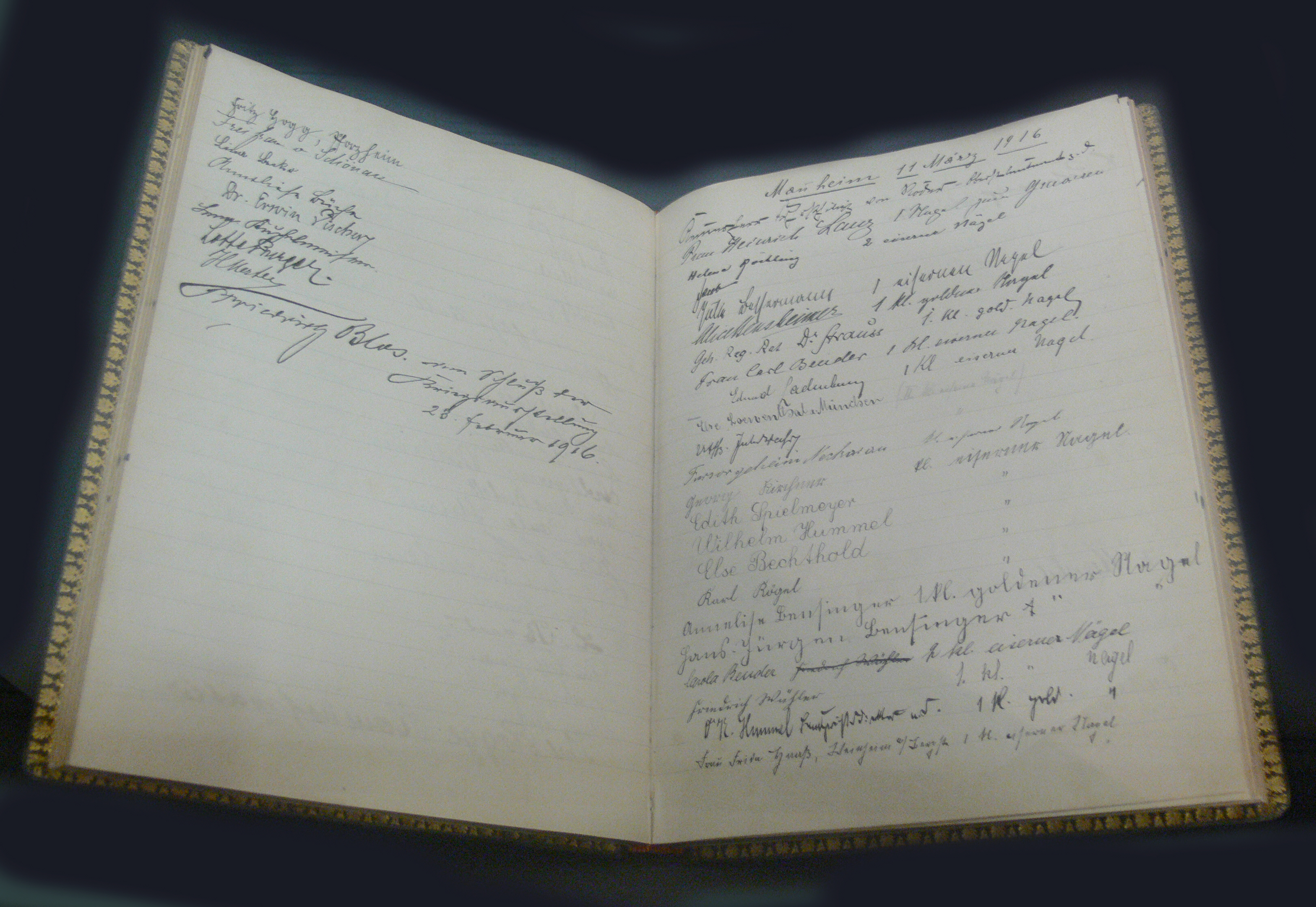
Nail Book recording donations for nails hammered into a cross in Mannheim in 1916

Nail Men or Men of Nails (German: Nagelmänner) were a form of propaganda and fundraising for members of the armed forces and their dependents in the Austro-Hungarian Empire and the German Empire in World War I. They consisted of wooden statues (usually of knights in armour) into which nails were driven, either iron (black), or coloured silver or gold, in exchange for donations of different amounts. Some took different forms, including pillars, shields or local coats of arms and crosses, especially the Iron Cross, and in German there are a variety of alternate names for them, including Wehrmann in Eisen or eiserner Wehrmann (Iron Guardian), Nagelfigur, Nagelbild or Nagelbrett (Nail Figure or Nail Board), Wehrschild (Defence Shield) and Kriegswahrzeichen (War Monument). The most famous were the original Wehrmann in Eisen in Vienna and the 'Iron Hindenburg', a 12-metre (39 ft) statue of Hindenburg adjacent to the Victory Column in Berlin.

== Origins and purpose ==
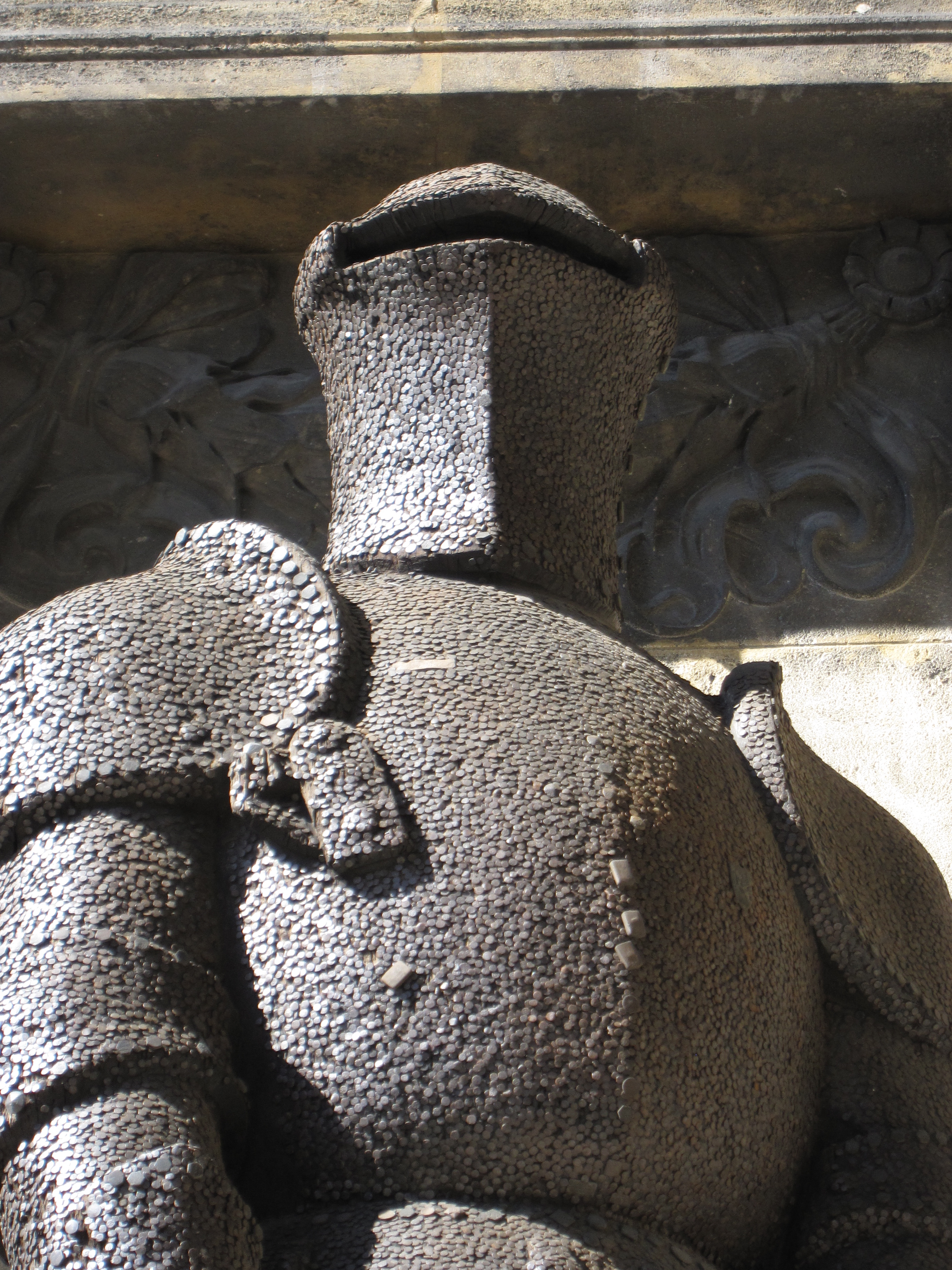
Close-up of the Vienna Wehrmann im Eisen showing the nails

The idea for the Nail Men came from the Stock im Eisen in Vienna, a tree-trunk which had had nails hammered into it for centuries. The first Nail Man, a medieval knight, was set up in Vienna and was first nailed on 6 March 1915 in a public ceremony attended by many dignitaries, including members of the imperial household and the German and Ottoman ambassadors. They were promoted as a patriotic fund-raising method in German-speaking parts of the Austro-Hungarian Empire and also in the German Empire, including by publications such as Gotthold Riegelmann's Der Stock in Eisen: praktische Ratschläge zur Errichtung einfacher Nagelholzmale mit Ideenskizzen und Kostenberechnungen (The Stock im Eisen: practical advice on the erection of simple wooden monuments for nailing with sketched ideas and cost calculations) and Benno Fitzke and Paul Matzdorf's Eiserne Kreuz-Nagelungen zum Besten der Kriegshilfe und zur Schaffung von Kriegswahrzeichen (Iron cross nailings for the best benefit of war aid and for the creation of war monuments). They have been seen as "fit[ting] in much more closely with Protestant celebrations of the Prussian military genius and the grandeur of the Kaiserreich" than with Austrian Catholicism.

Municipalities and charitable organisations, either specially founded associations or the Red Cross, had a statue or other emblem made out of wood (oak was sometimes recommended), sometimes by well known sculptors, such as the medieval knight Wehrmann in Eisen by Mathieu Molitar on the Naschmarkt in Leipzig. The nails which the donor could use depending on the level of the donation could be iron, or silver- or gold-plated. The placement of the nail also reflected the level of the donation. For example, in the case of the Iron Cross at Heidelberg, a black (iron) nail cost 1 mark, a silver nail hammered into the border, 3 marks, a nail in the '1914' inscription, 5 marks, in the 'W' for Kaiser Wilhelm, 10 marks, and in the crown at the top of the cross, 20 marks; in the case of the 'Iron Siegfried' at Wiesbaden, iron nails cost 1 mark, silver-coated, 5–20 marks, and gilded up to 300 marks, with further donations possible; in the case of the Hindenburg statue in Berlin, gold nails cost 100 marks, silver and black cost 5 marks, and grey 1 mark; for donations over 500 marks, a small plaque was nailed to the sword. Donations were often recorded in an 'Iron Book', for example at Heidelberg, and the donor often received a lapel pin, a certificate, or some other token of the donation. Medallions, postcards and other associated merchandise were sold as a further source of funds.

An iron cross was a popular choice of form, perhaps the most popular; it was specifically recommended by Fitzke and Matzdorf, who state that it would require 160–200 nails. Other common shapes were shields and coats of arms, but animals, flowers and ships (including U-boats) were also nailed. The figures in human form typically were knights in armour but sometimes depicted modern soldiers or historical and legendary figures. In addition to Hindenburg, Admiral Tirpitz, Rupprecht, Crown Prince of Bavaria and General Otto von Emmich were depicted as Nail Men.

Donations were usually collected to assist the wounded or for widows and orphans of the fallen. But in some cases, for example at Schwäbisch Gmünd, they were intended to help supply front soldiers; in the winter of 1916, the need was particularly great. The statues were usually prominently displayed and there was considerable social pressure to show patriotism by buying nails. The first nail was generally ceremonially driven by an important personage at a large patriotic ceremony including hymns and specially written patriotic poems which often evoked the Age of Chivalry; Fitzke and Matzdorf provide a suggested ceremony in 24 parts. Clubs, school classes, and so on performed group nailing; there were even nailings at the front.

== Locations ==
=== Austria ===
==== Vienna ====
- Vienna: Wehrmann im Eisen, a medieval knight in full armour.
- Alsergrund: a hunter, in an inn, donations benefitting the dependents of fallen professional hunters.
- Innere Stadt: a posthorn, in the Trade Ministry, 20 May 1917.
- Favoriten: a U-boat, set up by the local branch of the Austrian Fleet Association to raise money for construction of a new U-boat.
- Floridsdorf: a shield on a station platform, and the armorial oak of Army Chief of the General Staff Count Franz Conrad von Hötzendorf in an inn.
  - Stammersdorf: a shield.
- Grinzing: a grapevine, created by Professor F. Barwig of the Vienna School of Applied Arts and his students.
- Hietzing: a Wehrmann (knight).
- Kaiserebersdorf: an eagle.
- Landstraße: a soldier, the 'German master in iron', in the banqueting hall of the Third District, first nailed on 15 August 1915, and a field howitzer designed by the sculptor Alfred Hofmann, in the covered riding school of the 13th Field Howitzer Division's barracks in the Rennweg.
- Leopoldstadt: a shield and a soldier.
- Meidling: a shield.
  - Hetzendorf: an iron cross.
- Penzing: a Wehrmann (knight).
- Rodaun: a shield.
- Roßau: a table in a restaurant, from 12 October 1915.
- Wieden: one or more shields, with the proceeds divided between the fund for widows and orphans and the children of deceased members of the military from the locality.
- Vienna (precise location unknown): a U-boat donated by Gustav Krupp von Bohlen und Halbach. Archduke Franz Salvator drove the first nail on behalf of Emperor Franz Joseph.

==== Other locations in modern Austria ====
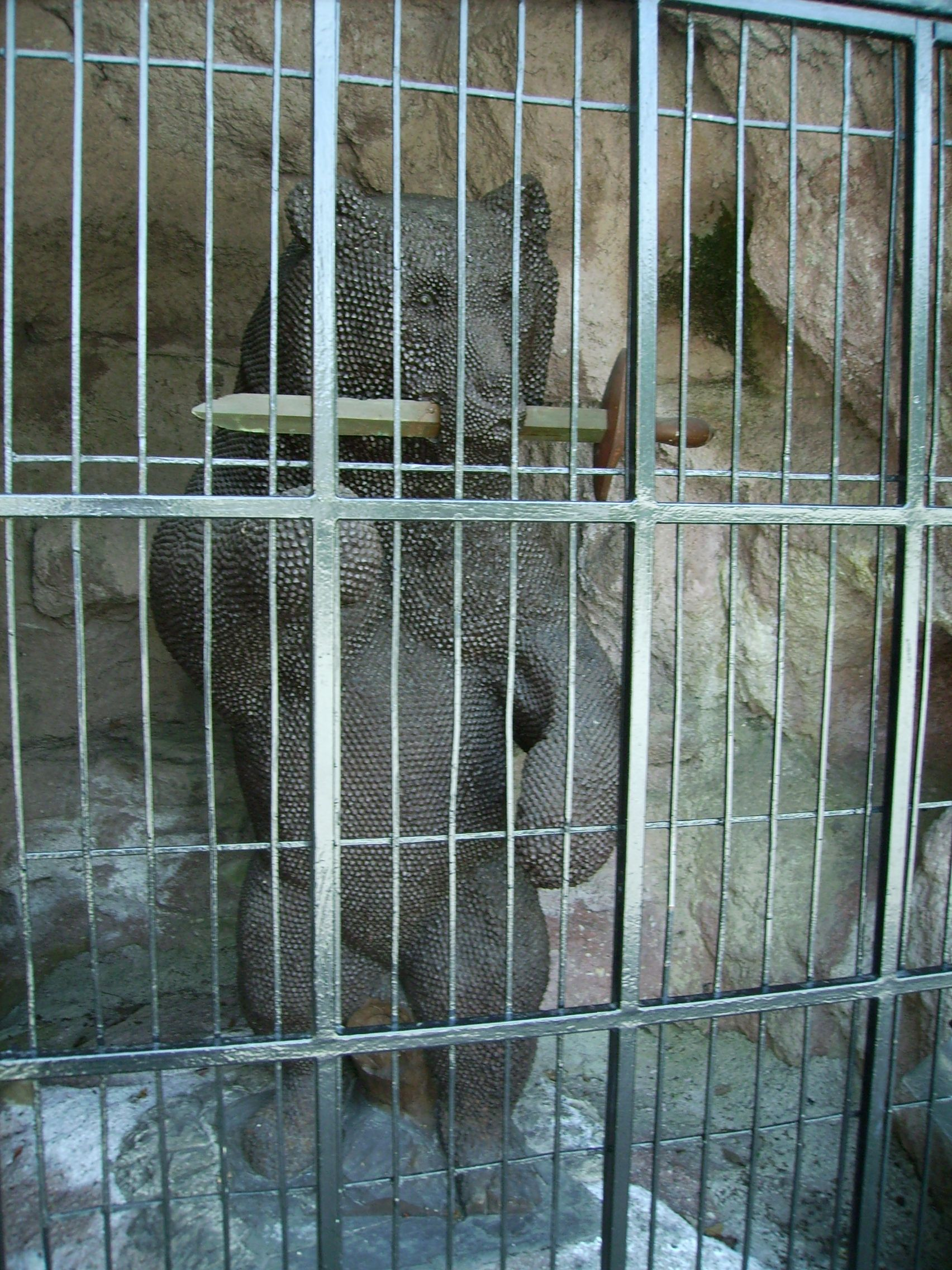
The Berndorf Nail Bear in his cage

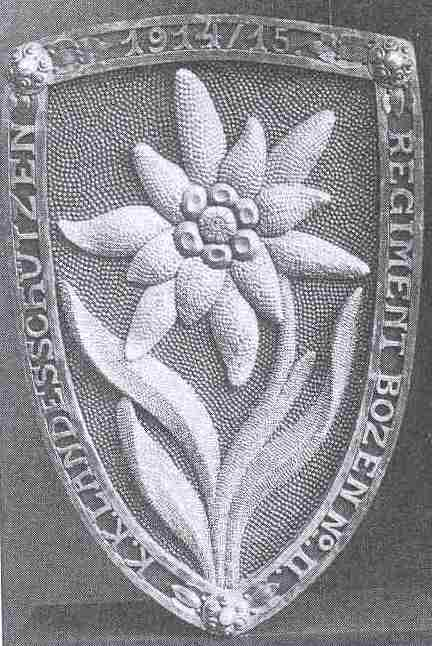
The Iron Edelweiss of Enns

- Amstetten: a Wehrmann (knight).
- Bad Hall: Tassilo.
- Bad Ischl: a shield.
- Berndorf. a bear with a sword in its mouth.
- Dorfgastein: a shield.
- Enns: an Edelweiss, by the sculptor Adolph Johannes Fischer, first nailed on 21 November 1915 by a regiment.
- Ernstbrunn: a shield.
- Feldbach: a soldier.
- Feldkirch: a shield.
- Gmunden: a Wehrmann (knight).
- Graz: a Wehrmann (knight).
- Gröbming: a shield.
- Hall in Tirol: a shield.
- Innsbruck: a soldier, called the eisener Blumenteufel (Iron Flower-Devil), designed by Albin Egger-Lienz.
- Jägerndorf: an eagle.
- Kaumberg: a shield.
- Klosterneuburg: a shield.
  - Kritzendorf, Klosterneuburg
- Königstetten: a shield.
- Krems an der Donau: the coat of arms of the locality.
- Kufstein: a soldier.
- Leoben: a shield.
- Linz: a Wehrmann (knight) by the sculptor Adolph Wagner.
- Marchtrenk: a table, made by a Russian prisoner of war and decorated with carvings by a corporal from Trieste.
- Mauerkirchen: a shield.
- Mödling: a wooden replica of a Škodamortar, unveiled on 22 August 1915 by Archduke Franz Salvator and his wife the Archduchess Blanka.
- Mürzzuschlag: a shield.
- Ober-Grafendorf: a shield.
- Poysdorf: a shield.
- Reutte: a Wehrmann (knight).
- Ried im Innkreis: an iron cross.
- Salzburg: Charlemagne.
- Sankt Pölten: a Wehrmann (knight).
- Steyregg: a shield.
- Stockerau: an oak trunk with warlike emblems and topped by a cavalry helmet, set up by the Reserve Officers' School.
- Ternitz: a hand grenade, set up by the local men's chorale on 20 August 1916.
- Vöcklabruck: a Wehrmann (knight).
- Vornbach am Inn: a shield.
- Wels: Emperor Maximilian.
- Wiener Neustadt
- Wieselburg: a Wehrmann in the form of a soldier with gun.
- Unknown location

==== Former Austro-Hungarian territories ====
===== now in Croatia =====
- Curzola (now Korčula), Dalmatia: a ship.
- Škrip (Brač): oval plaque with anchor, in the Skrip Museum
- Pula: a lighthouse.
- Dubrovnik: "zeljezni domobran" (Iron Royal Croatian Home Guard), Museum of Contemporary History

===== now in the Czech Republic =====
- Asch, now Aš: a Wehrmann (knight).
- Brünn, now Brno, Moravia: a Wehrmann (knight).
- Budweis, now České Budějovice, Bohemia: St. Barbara.
- Eger, now Cheb, Bohemia: a Wehrmann (knight).
- Hof, now Dvorce u Bruntálu, Moravia: a shield.
- Prague: a Wehrmann (knight).
- Prerau, now Přerov, Moravia: a Wehrmann (knight).
- Qualisch, now Chvaleč: a shield.
- Saaz, now Žatec, Bohemia: an obelisk.
- Trebisch, now Třebíč, Moravia: a shield.
- Troppau, now Opava, Silesia: a shield.

===== Hungary =====
- Budapest: a mounted knight of the period of King Matthias I in the Deák tér, by Ferenc Sidló.
- Stuhlweißenburg (Székesfehérvár): a Wehrmann (knight).
- Szeged: a Wehrmann (knight).

===== now in Poland =====
- Kraków: an iron cross.

===== now in Romania =====
- Hermannstadt or Sibiu: a Wehrmann (knight).
- Klausenburg or Cluj-Napoca: a Wehrmann (knight).

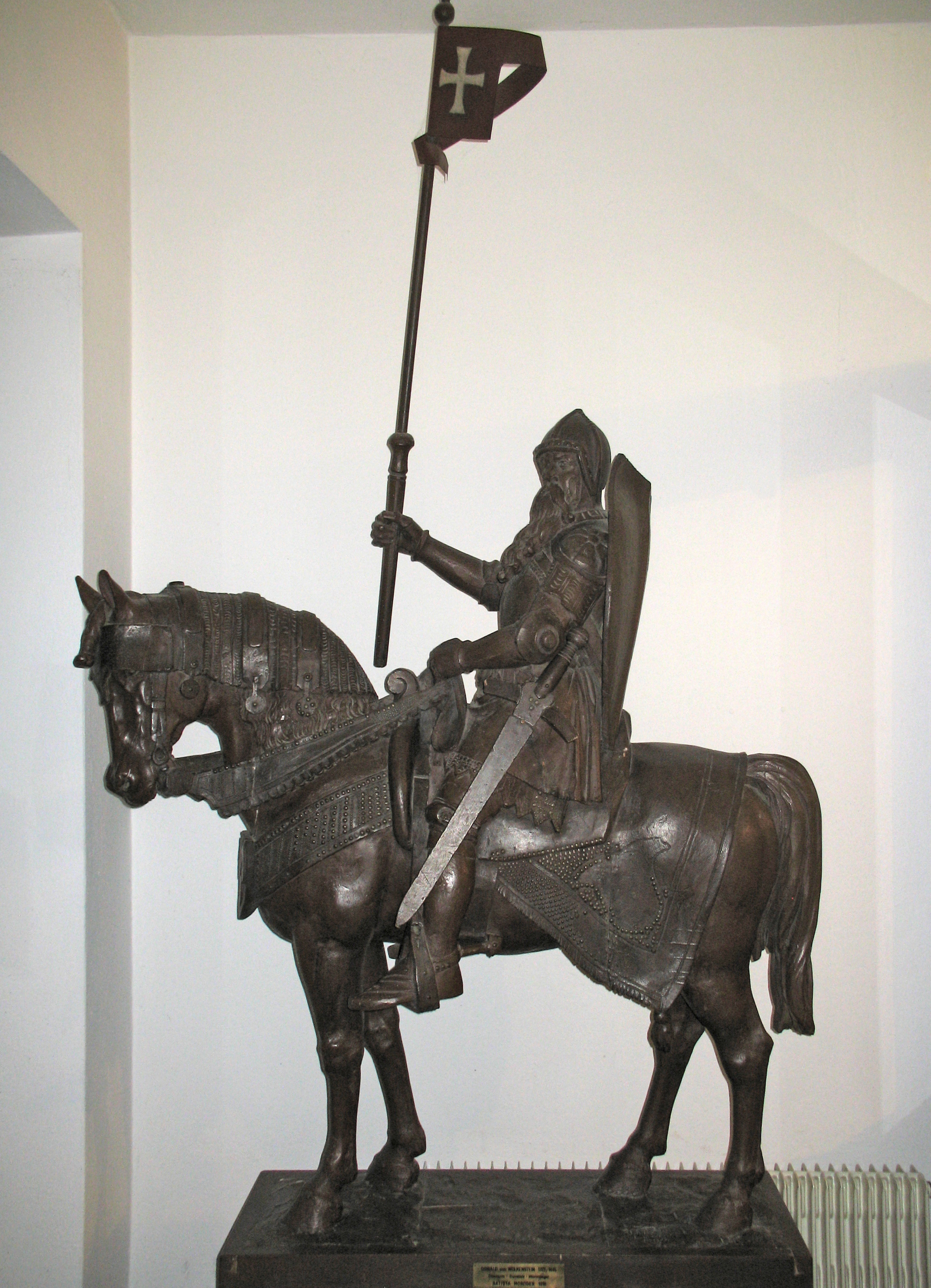
The mounted crusader of St. Ulrich in Gröden

===== South Tyrol, now in Italy =====
- Meran: St. Michael.
- Schlanders: a Vinschgau eagle.
- Sterzing: a Wehrmann (knight).
- St. Ulrich in Gröden: a crusader knight.

===== now in Ukraine =====
- Czernowitz: an imperial eagle, set up in memory of liberation from Russian occupation, and based on the eagle on the town hall roof, which the Russians had removed.
- Drohobycz: a Wehrmann (knight).
- Lemberg (Lviv): a Wehrmann (knight).

=== Germany ===
==== Berlin ====
- Charlottenburg: a shield.
- Lichtenberg: a 'German sword' on a street corner.
- Neukölln: Roland.
- Schöneberg-Wilmersdorf: a door.
- Spandau: an iron gate at the barracks of the 5th Guard Regiment.
- Tiergarten: Iron Hindenburg, next to the Victory Column in the Königsplatz, designed by Georg Marschall and inaugurated on 4 September 1915; Princess August Wilhelm drove the first nail into Hindenburg's name on the plinth. 1.15 million marks were raised. After the war the statue was sold for firewood.

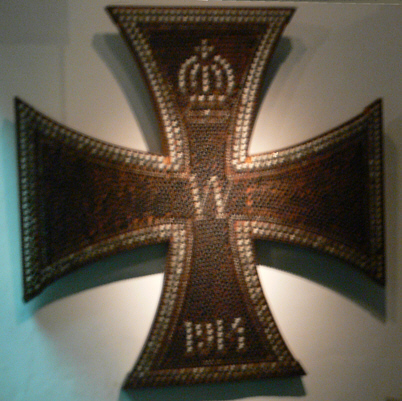
Iron Cross in the museum in Erfurt

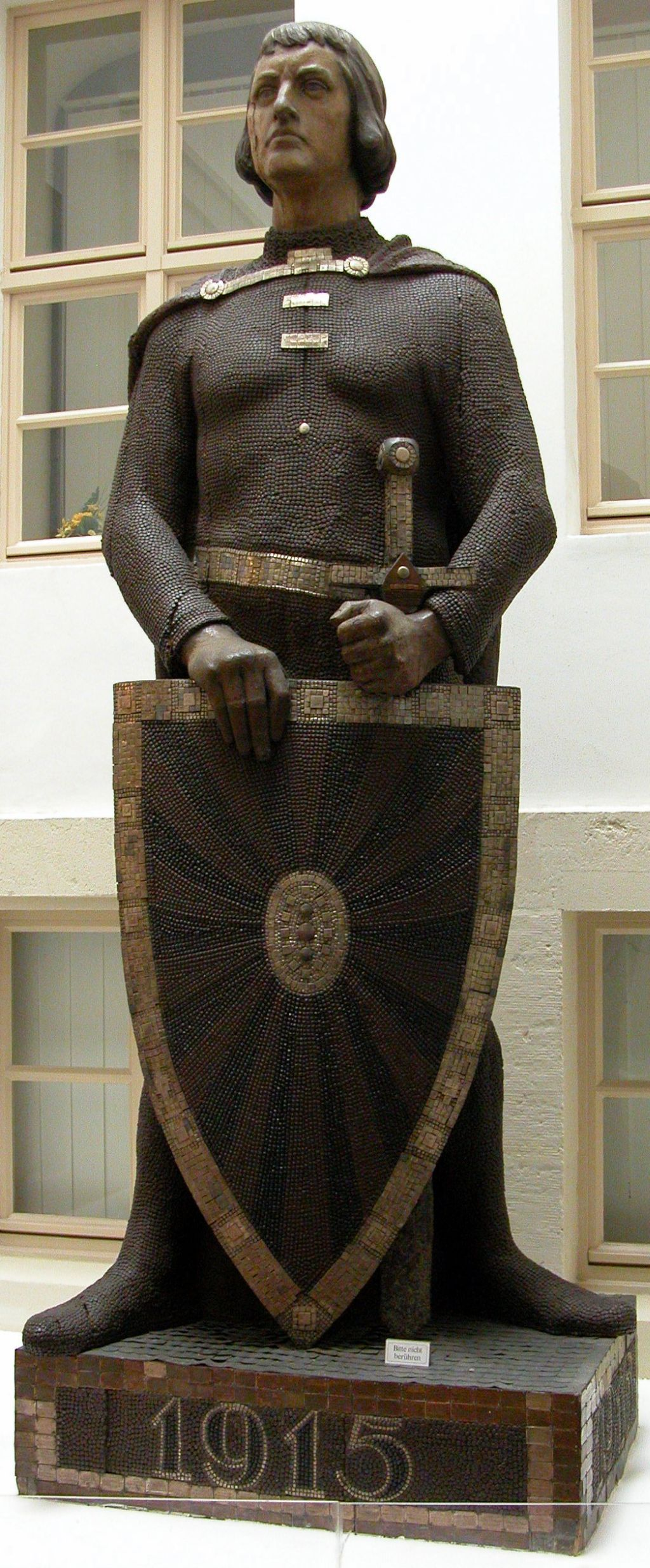
Iron Henry the Lion in Brunswick

==== Other locations in modern Germany ====
- Aachen: Roland.
- Abensberg: an iron cross.
- Achim: an iron cross.
- Aerzen: an iron cross.
- Altena: eiserner Töeger
- Alt Jabel (Mecklenburg): an iron cross.
- Alveslohe: an iron cross.
- Amberg: a Bulgarian red cross.
- Arendsee: an iron cross.
- Aschaffenburg: a Wehrmann (knight).
- Aschendorf: a war map, set up by the pupils at the local rectory school.
- Augsburg: a column.
- Bad Doberan: an iron cross.
- Bad Harzburg: an iron cross.
- Bad Königshofen im Grabfeld: the coat of arms of the locality.
- Bad Nenndorf: an ivy-twined stump.
- Bad Pyrmont: St. Michael (the patron saint of Germany).
- Bad Reichenhall: a Christian cross, set up in December 1915.
- Bad Tölz: an eagle, with a figure of Justice.
- Badbergen: an eagle.
- Bardowiek: an iron cross.
- Barsinghausen: the coat of arms of the locality.
- Bassum: an iron cross.
- Bayreuth: a sword (Nothung), made by the architect Hans Schmitz and first nailed on 28 May 1916.
- Behrendorf, Schleswig-Holstein
- Berchtesgaden: an iron cross.
- Bielefeld: a Wehrmann (knight).
- Bleckede: an iron cross.
- Bochum: a smith.
- Boffzen: a shield.
- Boitzenburg: an iron cross.
- Bonn: an oak, designed by Wilhelm Menser.
- Bramsche: a rose.
- Brandenburg an der Havel: Roland.
- Bremen: Roland.
- Bremerhaven: a column.
- Bremervörde: a Wehrmann (knight).
- Brinkum, now part of Stuhr: an iron cross.
- Brüel: an iron cross.
- Brunswick: Henry the Lion.
- Bützow: the coat of arms of the locality.
- Celle: two shields.
- Cham: an iron cross.
- Clausthal: a table.
- Cologne: Kölscher Boor (Cologne farmer, the embodiment of the city); 1.6 million marks raised.
- Cuxhaven: an iron cross.
- Darmstadt: an iron cross, set up on the initiative of the Landgravin of Hesse-Darmstadt on 23 April 1915.
- Delmenhorst: the coat of arms of the locality.
- Diepholz: a book.
- Dömitz: an iron cross.
- Dorstadt: a shield.
- Dortmund: St. Reinold, patron saint of the city.
- Dresden: an iron cross.
- Duderstadt: a table.
- Düsseldorf: the lion of the former Duchy of Berg, cast in metal, by J. Knubel.
- Eichstätt: the coat of arms of the locality and a Wehrmann (knight).
- Einbeck: an iron cross.
- Eitzum: an iron cross.
- Elberfeld: a Wehrmann (knight).
- Elmshorn: an iron cross.
- Elsfleth: the coat of arms of the locality.
- Emden: Isern Kerl (iron lad), representing Karl von Müller, captain of the light cruiser Emden.
- Erfurt: a soldier.
- Essen: the Smith of Essen, 1915.
- Fischbeck: an iron cross.
- Frankfurt: an eagle, to raise funds for German prisoners of war.
- Frankfurt an der Oder: a Wehrmann (knight).
- Freiburg im Breisgau: a tree at the Swabian Gate, for the Red Cross, the first nail being driven by the garrison commander on 15 November 1915.
- Frensdorf: an iron cross.
- Geislingen an der Steige: an Iron Helfensteiner (after the founding family of the town).
- Glörries (Mecklenburg): an iron cross.
- Görlitz: a Wehrmann (knight).
- Goslar: a shield, inaugurated on 1 August 1915, the first of many such fundraisers in Lower Saxony
- Gotha: an aeroplane, the eiserne Gotha-Taube (Iron Dove of Gotha), set up on 26 September 1915.
- Grabow: an iron cross and a shield.
- Grevesmühlen: a church door.
- Gütersloh: an eagle.
- Hagen: a smith, by Fritz Bagdons, inaugurated 28 November 1915. The "Iron Smith of Hagen" fund continued to aid war orphans and other dependents of the fallen after the war. Also the cruiser SMS Möwe (Seagull) and a seagull, designed by architect Edmund Körner, set up by pupils of two secondary schools.
  - Hagen-Haspe: a shield.
- Halberstadt: a Wehrmann (knight).
- Halle, North Rhine-Westphalia: an oak.
- Hamburg: an eagle and St. Michael.
  - Altona, Hamburg: Isern Hinnerk (Low German: Iron Henry, named for Heinrich von Borch).
  - Dockenhuden, Hamburg: a park bench, bearing the arms of Schleswig-Holstein and a patriotic motto.
  - Harburg, Hamburg: a guardian bird, first nailed on 2 September 1915.
- Hameln: a shield.
- Hamm: Count Adolf, founder of the city.
- Hannoversch Münden: an iron cross.
- Hanover: Roland, a painted disc, two cannons and a horse (the Saxon Steed), first nailed on dates from mid-August 1915 to May 1916.
  - Hainholz, Hannover-Nordstadt: a table, in the station inn.
- Heidelberg: Iron Cross surmounted by a crown, 190 cm square, 14 cm thick, with an Iron Book as a record of donations, in aid of the Red Cross. Unveiled 26 June 1915; by July 1917, almost 28,500 marks had been donated (3,344 silver nails and 16,083 iron nails) by approximately 15,000 people, about one tenth of whom added a personal message when they signed the book.
  - Rohrbach, Heidelberg: the coat of arms of the locality.
- Heilbronn: Sir Eisenhart, 7 May 1915.
- Hof: a Wehrmann (knight).
- Hohen Sprenz: an iron cross.
- Holzkirchen: a shield.
- Holzminden: an iron cross.
- Ingolstadt: a lion on a column.
- Itzehoe: Charlemagne.
- Jüterbog: Hindenburg.
- Kassel: a wellhead.
- Kaufbeuren: a shield.
- Kiel: a U-boat, inaugurated on 22 September 1915, and a lion designed by Edmund Körner in the girls' middle school.
- Kirchgellersen: a cross.
- Kleve: a Wehrmann (knight).

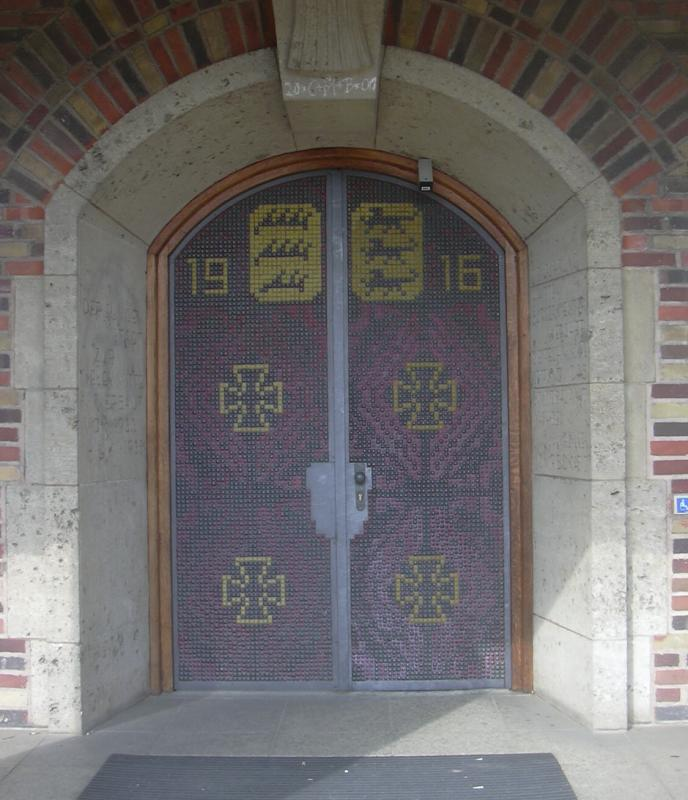
Door of the Kornwestheim town hall

- Kornwestheim: door of the town hall, with Iron Crosses and heraldry of the Kingdom of Württemberg, incorporated into the new town hall in 1935.
- Klütz: an iron cross.
- Krefeld: St. George.
- Kröpelin: an iron cross.
- Lamspringe: an iron cross.
- Landau: a soldier.
- Landshut: an iron cross on the town hall door.
- Lauenförde: a shield.
- Leer: an iron cross.
- Lehe: an iron cross.
- Leipzig: Medieval knight Wehrmann in Eisen by M. Molitar, 1916.
- Lindau: a ship.
- Lingen: the coat of arms of the locality.
- Lübeck: an eagle.
- Lübtheen: an iron cross.
- Lübz: an iron cross.
- Ludwigslust: an iron cross.
- Lüneburg: Hermann Billung.
- Magdeburg: Roland, but never nailed; an eagle was nailed as a youth organisation's thanks to war wounded.
- Mainz: a column.
- Malchin: an iron cross.

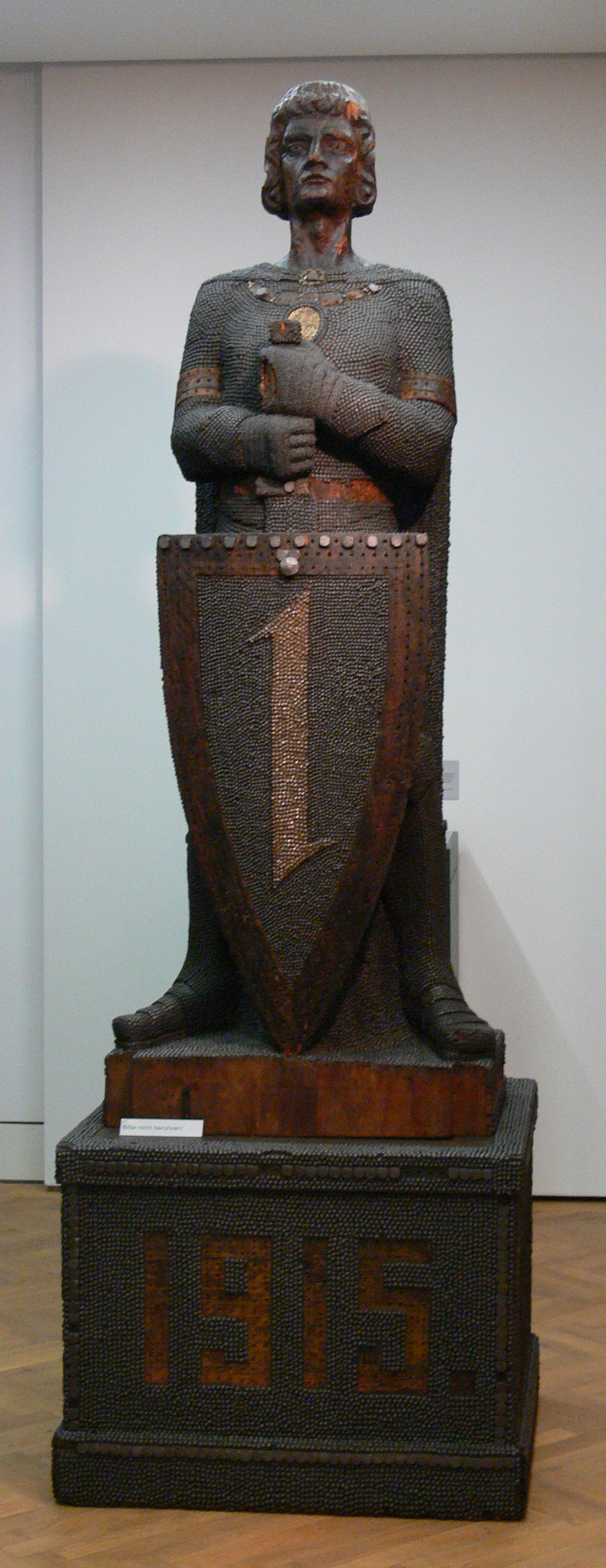
The Iron Roland of Mannheim

- Mannheim: Roland.
- Meldorf: Wulf Isebrand.
- Melle: a soldier.
- Mindelheim: a bell.
- Merseburg: a raven with a ring (from a legend).
- Mölln: an iron cross.
- Munster, Lower Saxony: a beehive, first nailed on 5 March 1916.
- Neuburg an der Donau: Rupprecht, Crown Prince of Bavaria, leader of the German forces in Lorraine.
- Neuhaus an der Elbe: an iron cross.
- Neustadt am Rhein: an iron cross.
- Neustadt an der Haardt: the coat of arms of the locality.
- Niedermarschacht: an iron cross.
- Nienburg: a shield.
- Nuremberg: an iron cross.
- Ohrdruf: St. Michael.
- Offenbach am Main: Götz von Berlichingen, designed by Ernst Unger, and an iron cross for the benefit of dependents of the fallen of Hesse.
- Oldenburg: Isern Hinnerk.
- Osnabrück: Charlemagne.
  - Haste, Osnabrück: an iron cross.
- Otterndorf: the coat of arms of the locality.
- Parchim: a Wehrmann (knight).
- Peine: an owl on a column.
- Penzlin: an iron cross.
- Plau am See: an iron cross.
- Potsdam: an iron cross.
- Prenzlau: Roland.
- Quakenbrück: eiserner Burgmann (iron burgher) for war aid.
- Recklinghausen: a column.
- Regensburg: Ratisbona, the embodiment of the city.
- Rehna: a shield.
- Ribnitz: the coat of arms of the locality.
- Rinteln: an iron cross.
- Rosenheim: a rose.
- Rostock: a gryphon.
- Saarbrücken: a knight.
- Sarstedt: an oak trunk.
- Schneeren: a machine gun.
- Schongau, Bavaria: a shield.
- Schöningen: an iron cross.
- Schüttorf: an iron cross.
- Schwäbisch Gmünd: Hans Rauchbein, a 16th-century mayor.
- Schwerin: a door of the cathedral, and an iron cross at the artillery barracks.
- Seesen: clasped hands, inaugurated 27 January 1916.
- Seyboldsdorf: a shield.
- Sittensen: an iron cross.
- Soltau: the coat of arms of the locality.
- Sottrum bei Holle: St. George.
- Stade: Goeben, named for General August Karl von Goeben, born in the city.
- Stadthagen: the coat of arms of the locality.
- Stadtoldendorf: the coat of arms of the locality.
- Stolzenau: an iron cross.
- Stuttgart: Wackerer Schwabe (doughty Swabian).
- Syke: a shield.
- Sylt: a U-boat.
- Teterow: an iron cross.
- Torgau: Mackensen column, named for Field Marshal August von Mackensen, who attended the gymnasium there for six years.
- Twistringen: a horse (the Saxon Steed).
- Uchte: an iron cross.
- Uelzen: a shield.
- Ulm: an iron cross.
- Vechta: a beam.
- Vellahn: Roland.
- Verden an der Aller: a book.
- Vienenburg: a shield.
- Vierzehnheiligen: an iron cross.
- Vilsen, Bruchhausen: an iron cross.
- Völpke: an iron cross.
- Volmarstein (now part of Wetter)
- Walsrode: the coat of arms of the locality.
- Warin: the coat of arms of the locality.
- Wasserburg am Inn: the lion from the town coat of arms, designed by the architect Maximilian von Mann, on the town hall door.
- Weener: Isern Hinnerk.
- Wellingsbüttel: a Kriegsbom (war tree).
- Werdenfelser Land: a fir-tree.
- Wiedensahl: a plate, first nailed 31 January 1917.
- Wiesbaden: Siegfried, 3.8 metres (12 ft) tall, designed by Carl Wilhelm Bierbrauer and carved by three sculptors at an estimated cost of 3,000 marks, defrayed by a donor. The first nail was driven on 26 September 1915 by Elisabeth, Princess of Schaumburg-Lippe, in the pommel of the sword. The take was reportedly some 20,000 marks on the first day and 2.5 million marks overall.
- Wilhelmshaven: Admiral Tirpitz, and a U-boat.
  - Rüstringen, now part of Wilhelmshaven: the coat of arms of the locality.
- Winsen an der Luhe: an iron cross.
- Wismar: the coat of arms of the locality.
- Wittingen: the coat of arms of the locality.
  - Zasenbeck, Wittingen: an iron cross.
- Wokern: an iron cross.
- Wunstorf: an iron cross.
- Würzburg: Deutscher Michel.
- Zweibrücken: the coat of arms of the locality.
- Zwickau: Hindenburg.

==== Former German territories ====
===== now in Denmark =====
- Alsen (Als): a soldier.

===== now in Lorraine, France =====
- Metz: a soldier.

===== now in Poland =====
- Angerburg (now Węgorzewo): Hindenburg dressed as a knight, with an iron cross on his chest.
- Breslau (now Wrocław): St. Michael.
- Danzig (now Gdańsk)
- Gleiwitz (now Gliwice)
- Graudenz (now Grudziądz): Hindenburg in armour as a Teutonic Knight.
- Kattowitz (now Katowice): a column.
- Jersitz, Posen (now Jeżyce, Poznań: a Wehrmann (knight).
- Reichenau, Silesia (now Niwa, Lower Silesian Voivodeship, Poland)

===== now in Russia =====
- Königsberg (now Kaliningrad): a Wehrmann (knight).

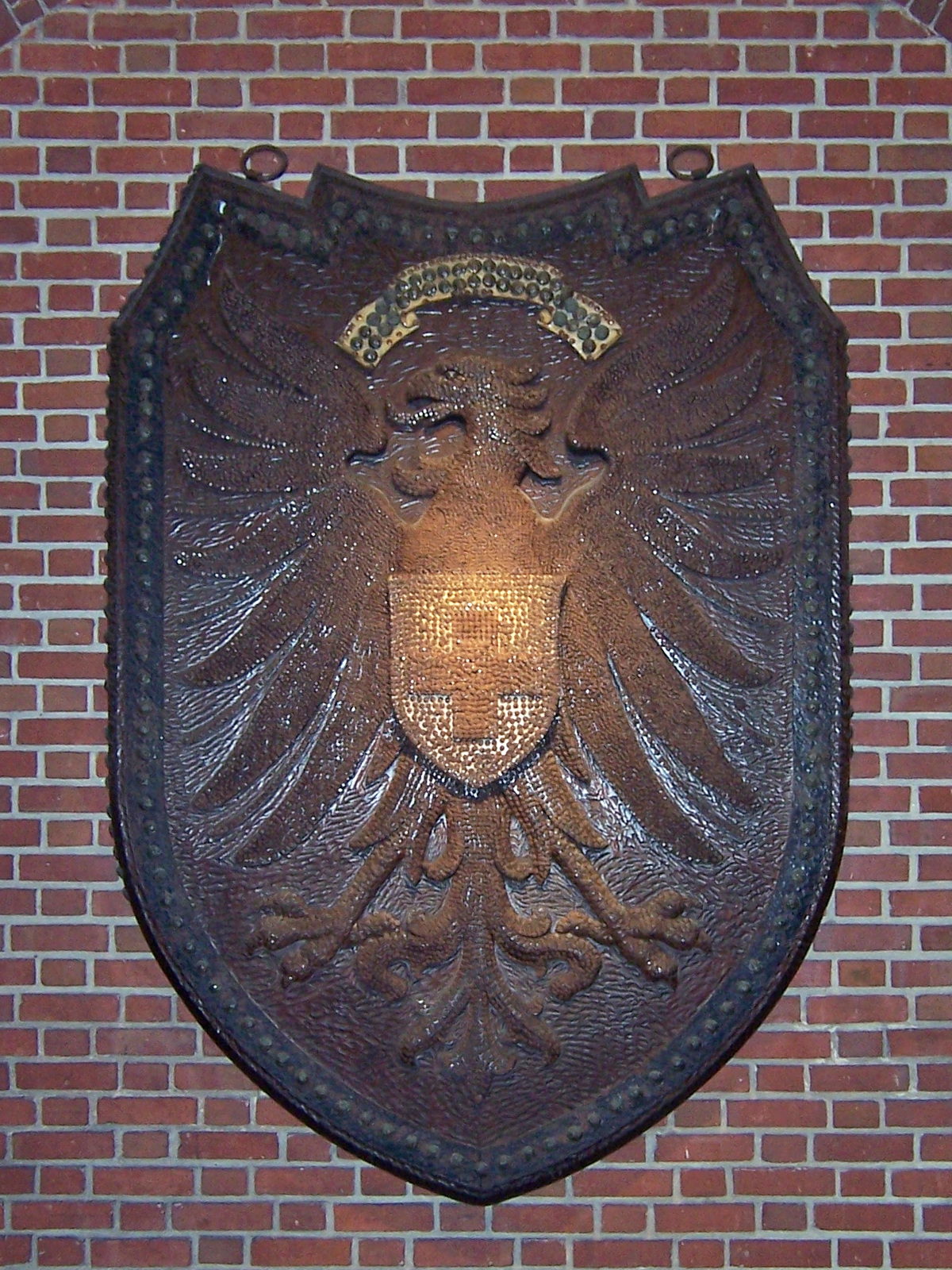
Baltimore Wehrschild used to collect money for the German and Austrian Red Cross

=== Elsewhere ===
==== Argentina ====
- Buenos Aires: a Wehrmann (knight).

==== Belgium ====
- Liège (then occupied by the Germans): General Otto von Emmich.

==== Bulgaria ====
- Sofia: a Wehrmann (knight).

==== France ====
- Rheims (then occupied by the Germans): an eagle.

==== Turkey ====
- Istanbul: the 'iron cannon of Stamboul', a wooden replica produced by the Škoda Works, placed in front of the War Ministry and inaugurated in April 1916 to commemorate the sinking of three enemy warships off the Dardanelles in March 1915.

==== United States ====
German-Americans and Austrian-Americans also collected money by means of Nail Men, until the entry of the US into the war on the Allied side.

- San Francisco: an iron cross.
- Baltimore: an eagle with a red cross on its breast, used to collect donations for the German and Austrian Red Cross until 1917.

In York, Pennsylvania, the same fundraising method was used with the opposite meaning: people paid 10 cents to drive a nail into the head of a statue of the kaiser with a red, white and blue handled hammer.

== Modern nailing ==
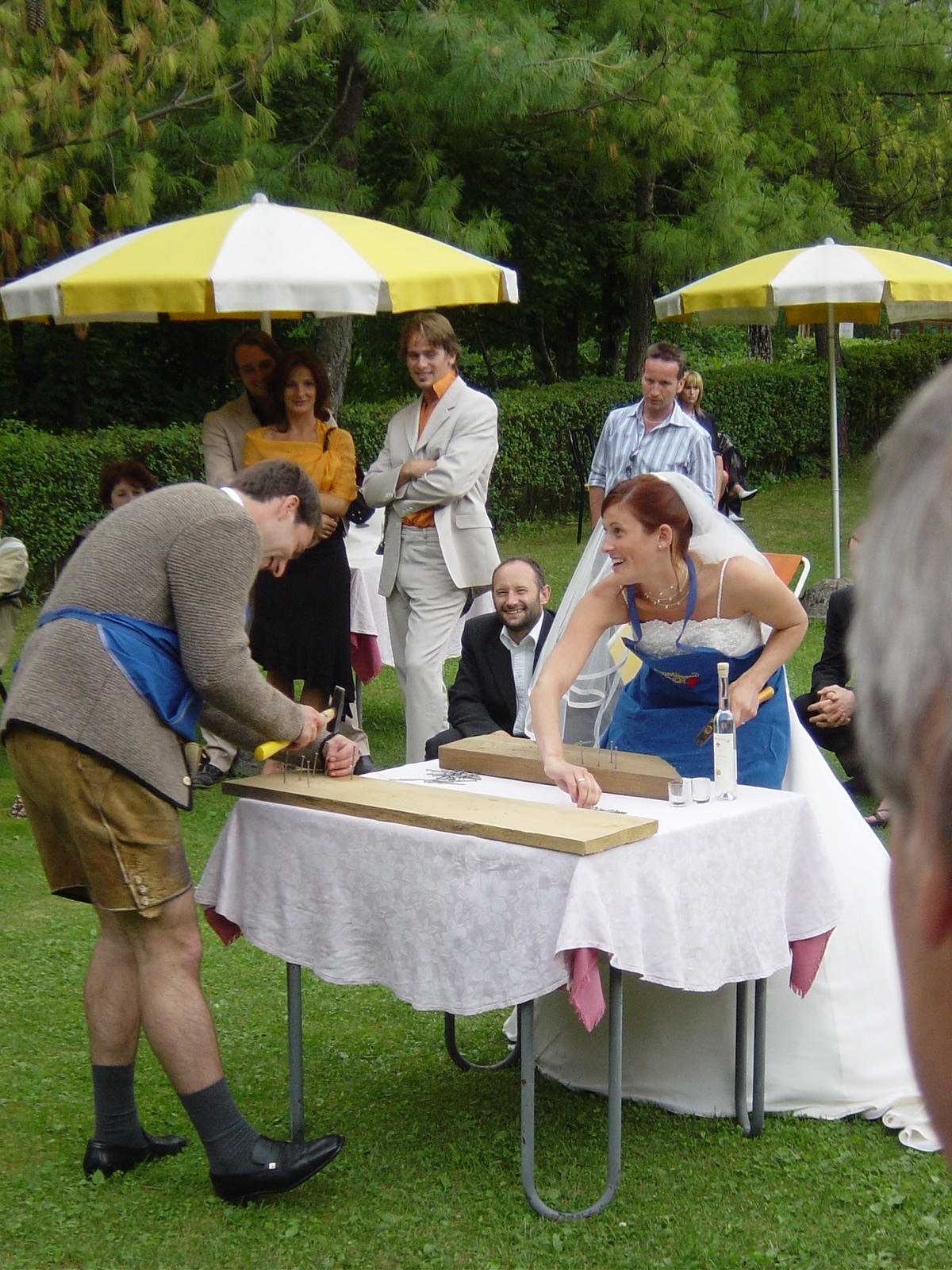
Nailing at a wedding

Florian Dering, a museologist at the Munich Stadtmuseum, describes a nailing game called Nagelbalken, which became popular after World War I in German-speaking countries and is still used to raise money for charity as well as at weddings, for the newlyweds to display their skills to those present.

== Sources ==
- Heiko Bockstiegel. "Der Eiserne Burgmann im Rathaussaal zu Quakenbrück". Heimat-Jahrbuch Osnabrücker Land 1980, pp. 54 ff. (in German)
- Martin Kronenberg. Die Bedeutung der Schule für die "Heimatfront" im Ersten Weltkrieg: Sammlungen, Hilfsdienste, Feiern und Nagelungen im Deutschen Reich. Dissertation, University of Göttingen, 2010. (in German) pdf at University of Göttingen. GoogleBooks preview. (in German)
- "New-York Tribune Pg 6". New-York Tribune. 1919. pp. 1–20. ISSN 1941-0646. OCLC 9405688.
- Gerhard Schneider. "Über Hannoversche Nagelfiguren im ersten Weltkrieg". Hannoversche Geschichtsblätter new series 50 (1996) 216–58. (in German)
- Gerhard Schneider. "Zur Mobilisierung der 'Heimatfront': Das Nageln sogenannter Kriegswahrzeichen im ersten Weltkrieg", Zeitschrift für Volkskunde 95 (1999) 32–62. (in German)
- Gerhard Schneider. "Nageln in Niedersachsen im Ersten Weltkrieg". Niedersächsisches Jahrbuch für Landesgeschichte 76 (2004) 245–84. (in German)
- Karl-Robert Schütze. Der eiserne Hindenburg. Berlin: Karl-Robert Schütze, 2007. ISBN 9783928589215 (in German)
