= Fritz Bleichröder =

German physician (1875–1938)

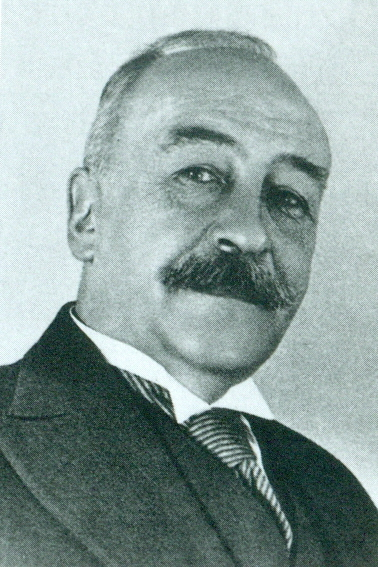

Fritz Bleichröder (January 12, 1875, in Berlin – November 8, 1938, in Berlin) was a German Jewish physician, best remembered for his research and experiments with catheters and cardiac catheterization alongside Werner Forssmann and Ernst Unger. He was a nephew of Gerson von Bleichröder.
