= Ahrenviöl =

Ahrenviöl Arenfjolde / Årnfjål
- Municipality
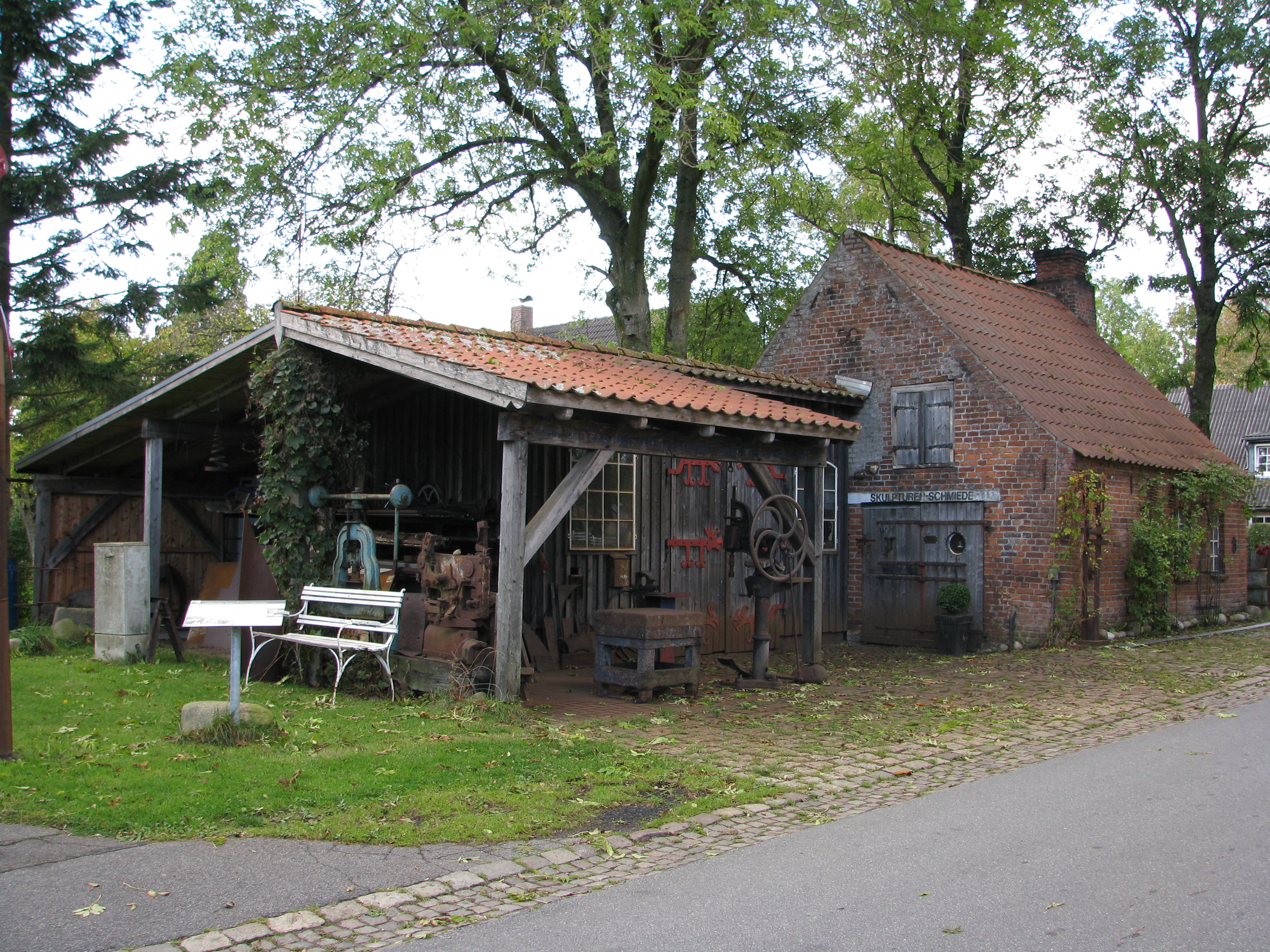
- Historical forge at Almdorf

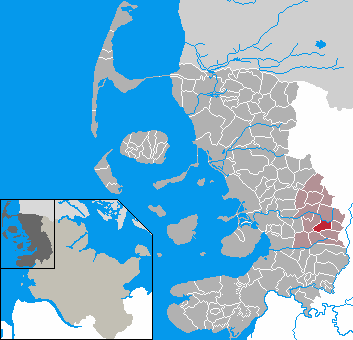
- Location of Ahrenviöl; Arenfjolde / Årnfjål within Nordfriesland district
- Interactive map of Ahrenviöl; Arenfjolde / Årnfjål
- Location within Germany Location within Schleswig-Holstein
- Coordinates: 54°32′N 9°12′E
- Country: Germany
- State: Schleswig-Holstein
- District: Nordfriesland
- Municipal assoc.: Viöl

Government
  - Mayor: Heinz Günter Hansen

Area
  - Total: 10.11 km^{2} (3.90 sq mi)
- Elevation: 24 m (79 ft)

Population (2025-12-31)
  - Total: 518
  - Density: 51.2/km^{2} (133/sq mi)
- Time zone: UTC+01:00 (CET)
  - Summer (DST): UTC+02:00 (CEST)
- Postal codes: 25885
- Dialling codes: 04847
- Vehicle registration: NF
- Website: www.amt-vioel.de

Ahrenviöl (Danish: Arenfjolde, North Frisian: Årnfjål) is a municipality in Nordfriesland district, in northern Germany. It is part of the Amt Viöl.
