= Löwenstedt =

Löwenstedt Lyngsted
- Municipality
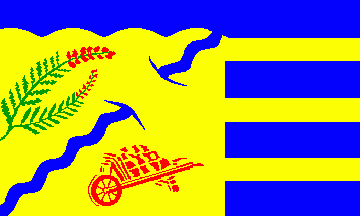
- Flag Coat of arms

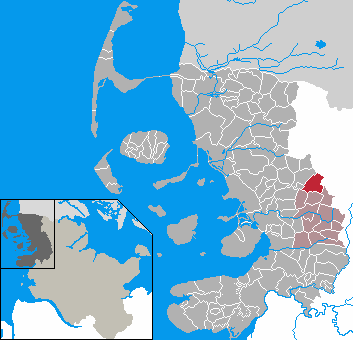
- Location of Löwenstedt; Lyngsted within Nordfriesland district
- Interactive map of Löwenstedt; Lyngsted
- Location within Germany Location within Schleswig-Holstein
- Coordinates: 54°37′N 9°10′E
- Country: Germany
- State: Schleswig-Holstein
- District: Nordfriesland
- Municipal assoc.: Viöl

Government
  - Mayor: Holger Jensen

Area
  - Total: 19.62 km^{2} (7.58 sq mi)
- Elevation: 14 m (46 ft)

Population (2025-12-31)
  - Total: 705
  - Density: 35.9/km^{2} (93.1/sq mi)
- Time zone: UTC+01:00 (CET)
  - Summer (DST): UTC+02:00 (CEST)
- Postal codes: 25864
- Dialling codes: 04843
- Vehicle registration: NF
- Website: www.amt-vioel.de

Löwenstedt (Danish: Lyngsted or Lyngsæd) is a municipality in the district of Nordfriesland, in Schleswig-Holstein, Germany. It is located 33Km south of Flensburg and the Danish border.
