= Ahrenviölfeld =

Ahrenviölfeld Arenfjoldemark
- Municipality
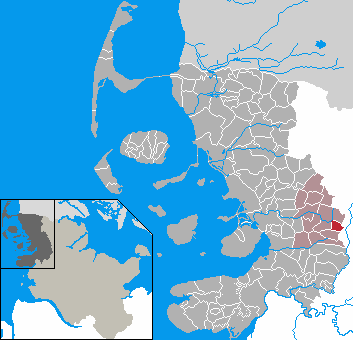
- Location of Ahrenviölfeld; Arenfjoldemark within Nordfriesland district
- Interactive map of Ahrenviölfeld; Arenfjoldemark
- Location within Germany Location within Schleswig-Holstein
- Coordinates: 54°32′N 9°17′E
- Country: Germany
- State: Schleswig-Holstein
- District: Nordfriesland
- Municipal assoc.: Viöl

Government
  - Mayor: Stefan Petersen

Area
  - Total: 7.29 km^{2} (2.81 sq mi)
- Elevation: 10 m (33 ft)

Population (2025-12-31)
  - Total: 223
  - Density: 30.6/km^{2} (79.2/sq mi)
- Time zone: UTC+01:00 (CET)
  - Summer (DST): UTC+02:00 (CEST)
- Postal codes: 25885
- Dialling codes: 04626
- Vehicle registration: NF
- Website: www.amt-vioel.de

Ahrenviölfeld (Danish: Arenfjoldemark) is a municipality in Nordfriesland district, in northern Germany.
