= Ostenau =

Ostenau Øster Å
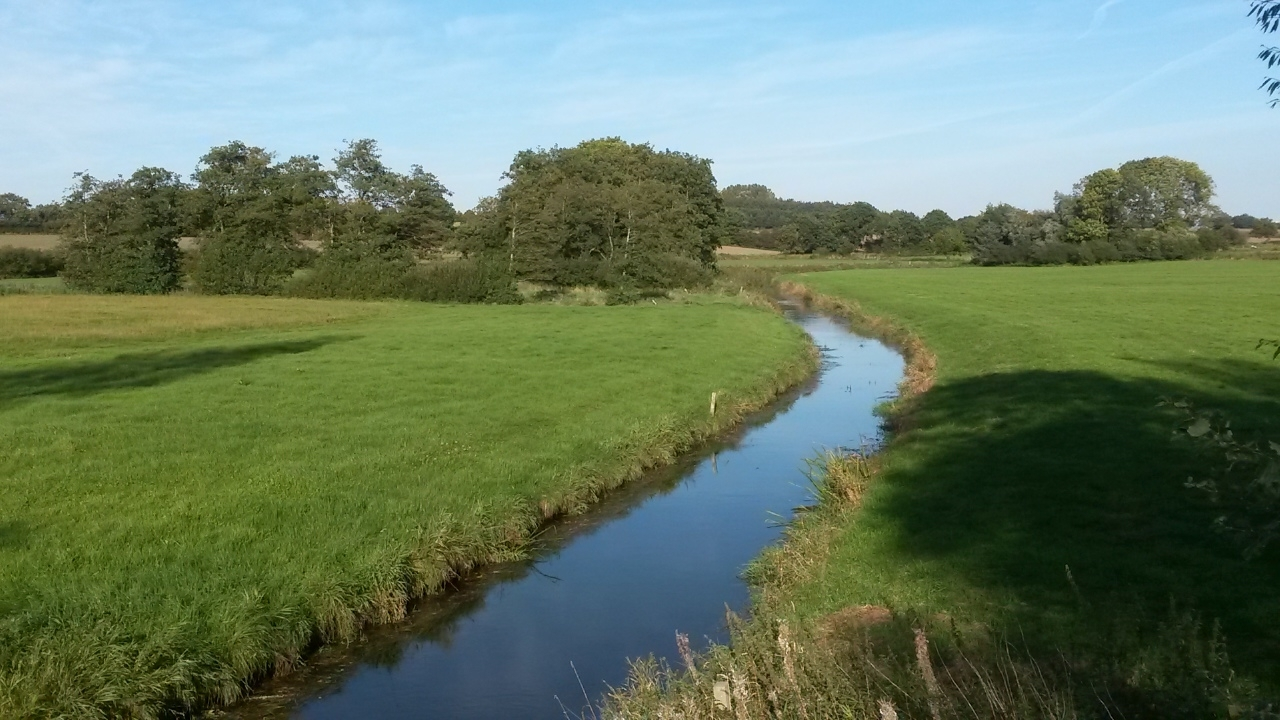

Location
- Country: Germany
- States: Schleswig-Holstein

Physical characteristics
- Mouth
  - location: Arlau
  - coordinates: 54.5661°N 9.0214°E

Basin features
- Progression: Arlau→ North Sea

Ostenau (Danish: Øster Å) is a river of Schleswig-Holstein, Germany. It flows into the Arlau near Almdorf.

== See also ==
- List of rivers of Schleswig-Holstein
