= Viöl (Amt) =

Amt in Schleswig-Holstein, Germany

- Amt
- Flag Coat of arms

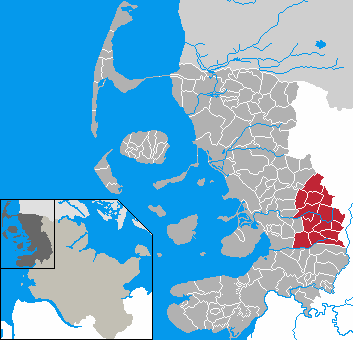
- Map of Nordfriesland highlighting Viöl
- Interactive map of Viöl
- Location within Germany Location within Schleswig-Holstein
- Coordinates: 54°34′N 9°11′E
- Country: Germany
- State: Schleswig-Holstein
- District: Nordfriesland
- Seat: Viöl
- Subdivisions: 13 municipalities

Government
  - Mayor: Eckhard Abel

Area
  - Total: 177.76 km^{2} (68.63 sq mi)

Population (2025-12-31)
  - Total: 9,517
  - Density: 53.54/km^{2} (138.7/sq mi)
- Time zone: UTC+01:00 (CET)
  - Summer (DST): UTC+02:00 (CEST)
- Website: www.amt-vioel.de

Viöl is an Amt ("collective municipality") in the district of Nordfriesland, in Schleswig-Holstein, Germany. Its seat is in Viöl.

The Amt Viöl consists of the following municipalities:

1. Ahrenviöl
2. Ahrenviölfeld
3. Behrendorf
4. Bondelum
5. Haselund
6. Immenstedt
7. Löwenstedt
8. Norstedt
9. Oster-Ohrstedt
10. Schwesing
11. Sollwitt
12. Viöl
13. Wester-Ohrstedt
