= Haselund =

- Municipality
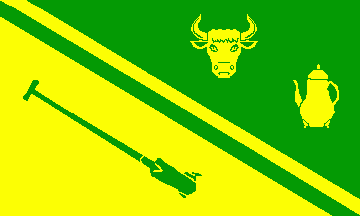
- Flag Coat of arms

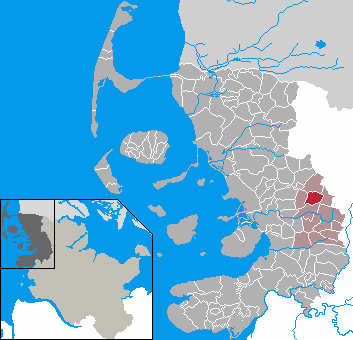
- Location of Haselund within Nordfriesland district
- Interactive map of Haselund
- Location within Germany Location within Schleswig-Holstein
- Coordinates: 54°36′N 9°10′E
- Country: Germany
- State: Schleswig-Holstein
- District: Nordfriesland
- Municipal assoc.: Viöl

Government
  - Mayor: Jan Thormählen

Area
  - Total: 12.79 km^{2} (4.94 sq mi)
- Elevation: 20 m (66 ft)

Population (2025-12-31)
  - Total: 933
  - Density: 72.9/km^{2} (189/sq mi)
- Time zone: UTC+01:00 (CET)
  - Summer (DST): UTC+02:00 (CEST)
- Postal codes: 25855
- Dialling codes: 04843
- Vehicle registration: NF
- Website: www.amt-vioel.de

Haselund is a municipality in the district of Nordfriesland, in Schleswig-Holstein, Germany.
