= Norstedt =

Norstedt Nordsted / Noorst
- Municipality
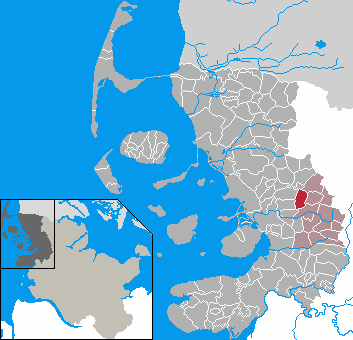
- Location of Norstedt; Nordsted / Noorst within Nordfriesland district
- Interactive map of Norstedt; Nordsted / Noorst
- Location within Germany Location within Schleswig-Holstein
- Coordinates: 54°34′N 9°7′E
- Country: Germany
- State: Schleswig-Holstein
- District: Nordfriesland
- Municipal assoc.: Viöl

Government
  - Mayor: Henning Thomsen

Area
  - Total: 13.5 km^{2} (5.2 sq mi)
- Elevation: 8 m (26 ft)

Population (2025-12-31)
  - Total: 383
  - Density: 28.4/km^{2} (73.5/sq mi)
- Time zone: UTC+01:00 (CET)
  - Summer (DST): UTC+02:00 (CEST)
- Postal codes: 25884
- Dialling codes: 04843
- Vehicle registration: NF
- Website: www.norstedt.de

Norstedt (Danish: Nordsted, North Frisian: Noorst) is a municipality in the district of Nordfriesland, in Schleswig-Holstein, Germany.
