= Oster-Ohrstedt =

Oster-Ohrstedt Øster Ørsted
- Municipality
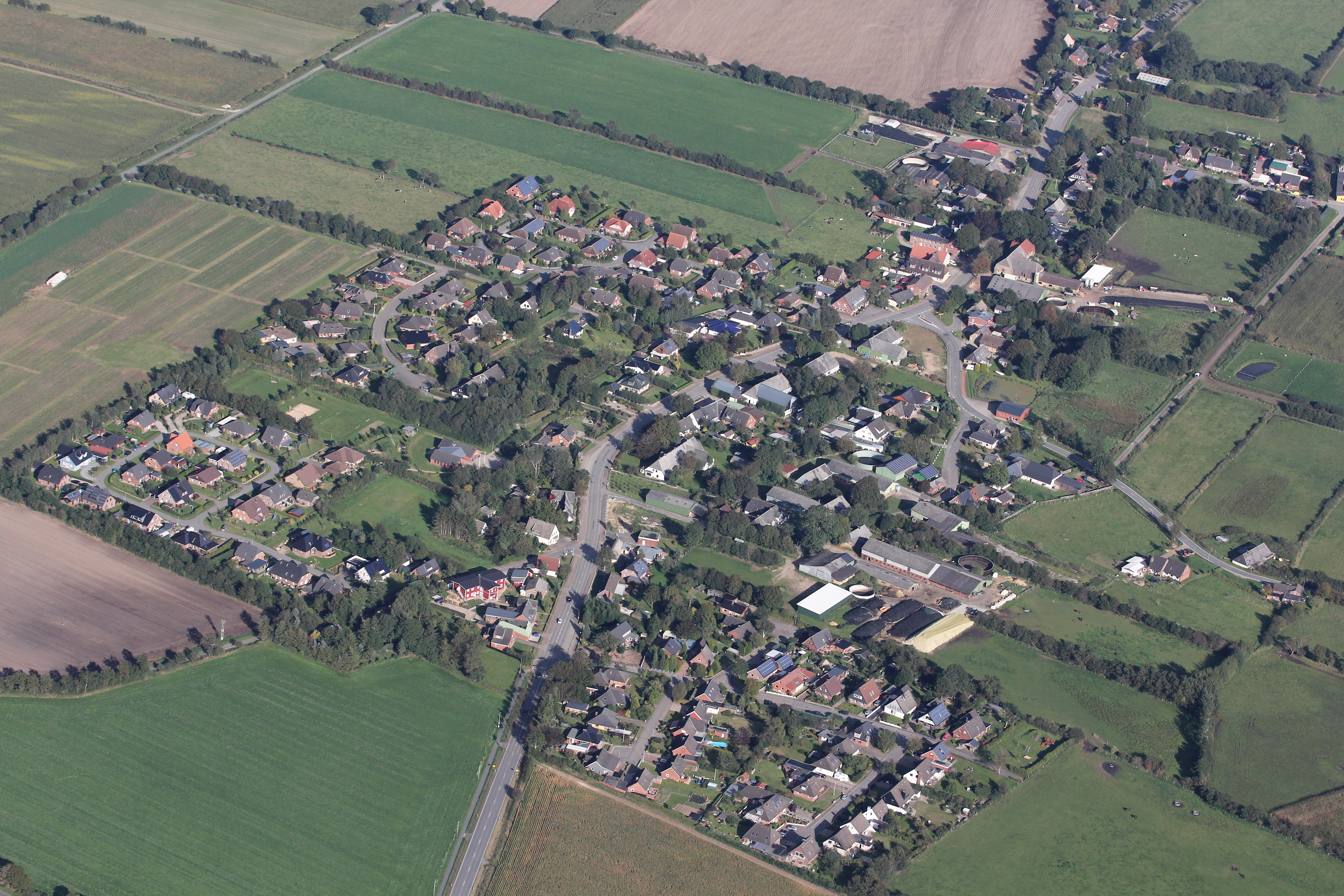
- Oster-Ohrstedt from above

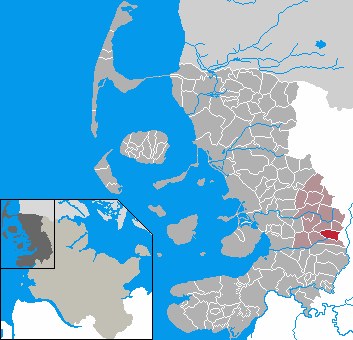
- Location of Oster-Ohrstedt; Øster Ørsted within Nordfriesland district
- Interactive map of Oster-Ohrstedt; Øster Ørsted
- Location within Germany Location within Schleswig-Holstein
- Coordinates: 54°31′N 9°13′E
- Country: Germany
- State: Schleswig-Holstein
- District: Nordfriesland
- Municipal assoc.: Viöl

Government
  - Mayor: Otto Schimmer

Area
  - Total: 11.29 km^{2} (4.36 sq mi)
- Elevation: 18 m (59 ft)

Population (2025-12-31)
  - Total: 678
  - Density: 60.1/km^{2} (156/sq mi)
- Time zone: UTC+01:00 (CET)
  - Summer (DST): UTC+02:00 (CEST)
- Postal codes: 25885
- Dialling codes: 04847
- Vehicle registration: NF
- Website: www.amt-vioel.de

Oster-Ohrstedt (Danish: Øster Ørsted, North Frisian: Aaster Uurst) is a municipality in the district of Nordfriesland, in Schleswig-Holstein, Germany.
