= Immenstedt, Nordfriesland =

Immenstedt Immingsted
- Municipality
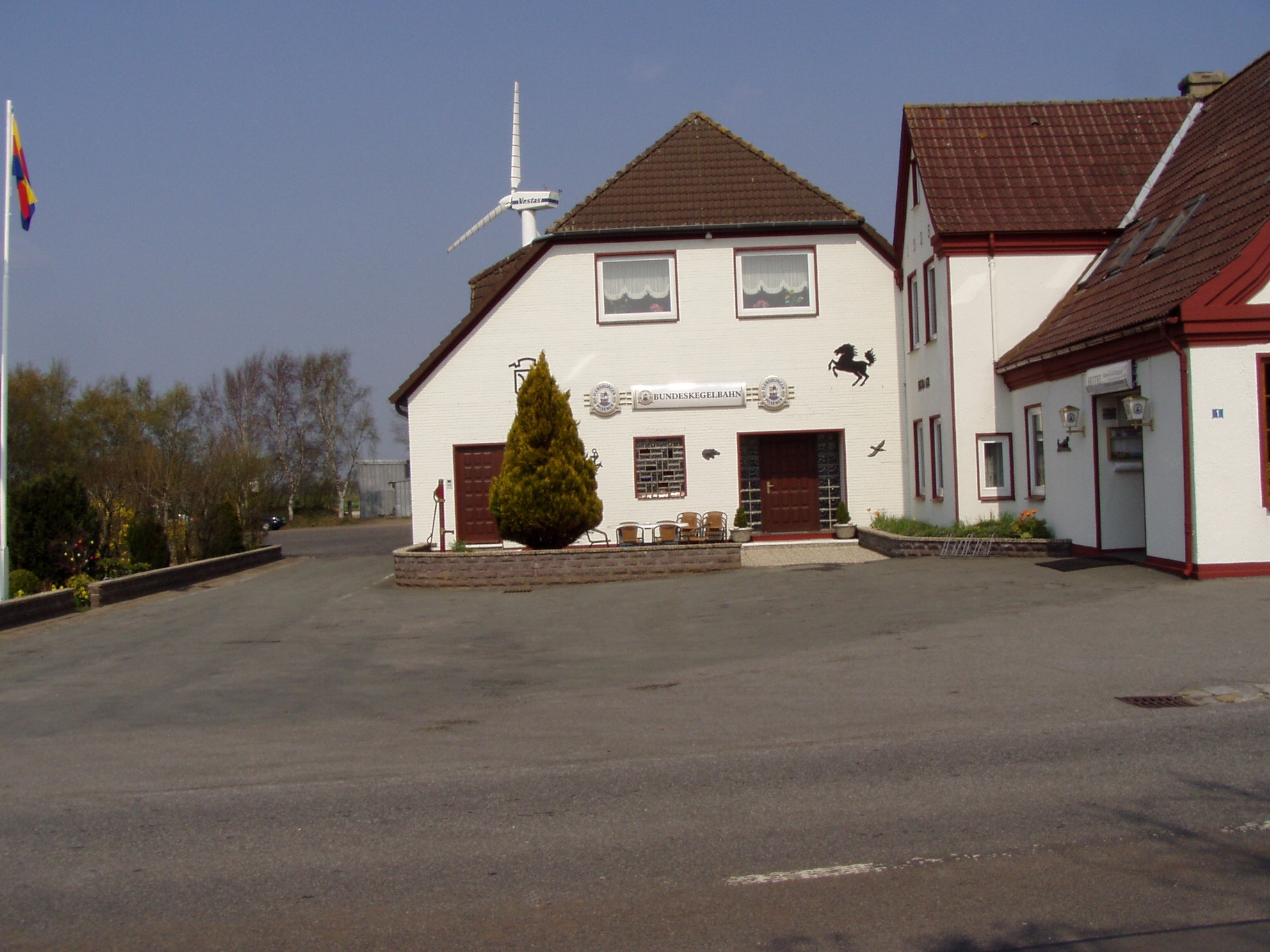
- The former train station of Immenstedt

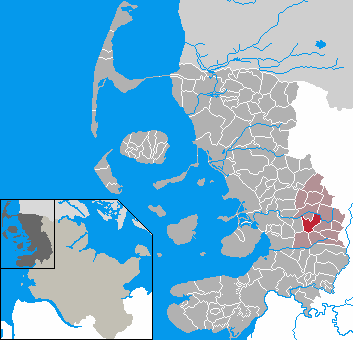
- Location of Immenstedt; Immingsted within Nordfriesland district
- Interactive map of Immenstedt; Immingsted
- Location within Germany Location within Schleswig-Holstein
- Coordinates: 54°31′N 9°10′E
- Country: Germany
- State: Schleswig-Holstein
- District: Nordfriesland
- Municipal assoc.: Viöl

Government
  - Mayor: Johann-Adolf Albertsen

Area
  - Total: 14.61 km^{2} (5.64 sq mi)
- Elevation: 19 m (62 ft)

Population (2025-12-31)
  - Total: 667
  - Density: 45.7/km^{2} (118/sq mi)
- Time zone: UTC+01:00 (CET)
  - Summer (DST): UTC+02:00 (CEST)
- Postal codes: 25885
- Dialling codes: 04843, 04847
- Vehicle registration: NF
- Website: www.amt-vioel.de

Immenstedt (German pronunciation: [ˈɪmənʃtɛt]; Danish: Immingsted) is a municipality in the district of Nordfriesland, in Schleswig-Holstein, Germany.
