= Viöl =

Viöl Fjolde
- Municipality
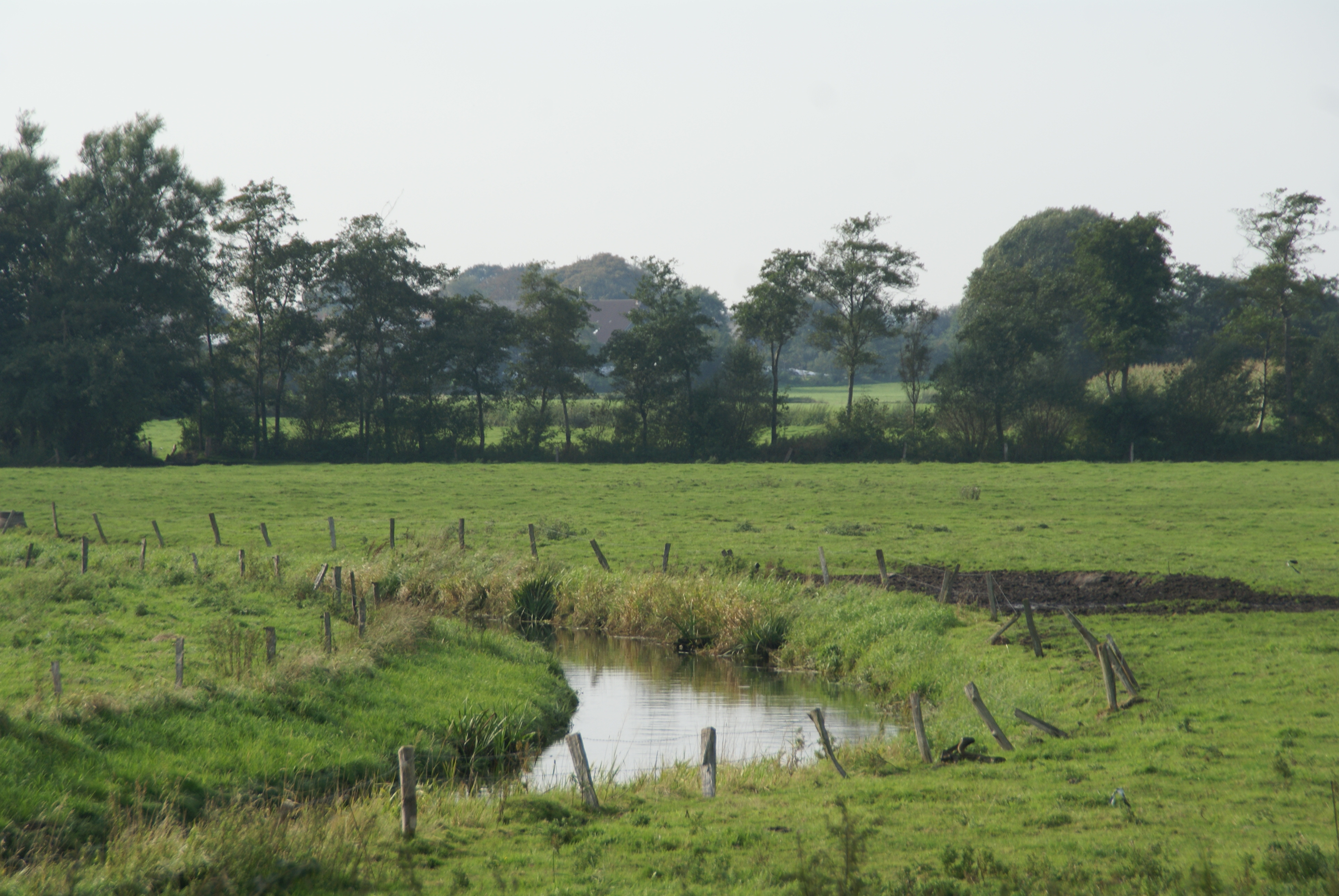
- The Arlau river at Viöl

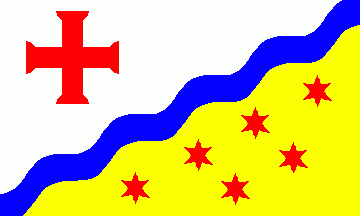
- Flag Coat of arms

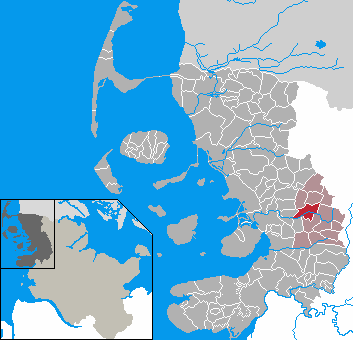
- Location of Viöl; Fjolde within Nordfriesland district
- Interactive map of Viöl; Fjolde
- Location within Germany Location within Schleswig-Holstein
- Coordinates: 54°34′14″N 9°11′2″E
- Country: Germany
- State: Schleswig-Holstein
- District: Nordfriesland
- Municipal assoc.: Viöl

Government
  - Mayor: Heinrich Schmidt-Durdaut (CDU)

Area
  - Total: 18.95 km^{2} (7.32 sq mi)
- Elevation: 22 m (72 ft)

Population (2025-12-31)
  - Total: 2,370
  - Density: 125/km^{2} (324/sq mi)
- Time zone: UTC+01:00 (CET)
  - Summer (DST): UTC+02:00 (CEST)
- Postal codes: 25884
- Dialling codes: 04843
- Vehicle registration: NF
- Website: www.amt-vioel.de

Viöl (German pronunciation: [vi̯ˈøːl]; Danish: Fjolde, North Frisian: Fjåål) is a municipality in the district of Nordfriesland, in Schleswig-Holstein, Germany. It is situated approximately 12 km northeast of Husum, and 30 km southwest of Flensburg.

Viöl is the seat of the Amt of (collective municipality) Viöl.

A variety of South Jutlandic was spoken there until 1937, called "Fjoldedansk".
