= Sollwitt =

Sollwitt Solved
- Municipality
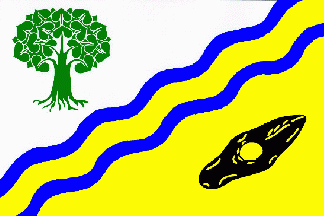
- Flag Coat of arms

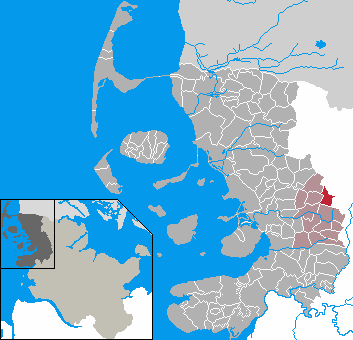
- Location of Sollwitt; Solved within Nordfriesland district
- Interactive map of Sollwitt; Solved
- Location within Germany Location within Schleswig-Holstein
- Coordinates: 54°35′41″N 9°13′39″E
- Country: Germany
- State: Schleswig-Holstein
- District: Nordfriesland
- Municipal assoc.: Viöl

Government
  - Mayor: Thomas Hansen

Area
  - Total: 10.95 km^{2} (4.23 sq mi)
- Elevation: 23 m (75 ft)

Population (2025-12-31)
  - Total: 294
  - Density: 26.8/km^{2} (69.5/sq mi)
- Time zone: UTC+01:00 (CET)
  - Summer (DST): UTC+02:00 (CEST)
- Postal codes: 25884
- Dialling codes: 04843
- Vehicle registration: NF
- Website: www.amt-vioel.de

Sollwitt (Danish: Solved, North Frisian: Salwit) is a municipality in the district of Nordfriesland, in Schleswig-Holstein, Germany.
