= Bondelum =

- Municipality
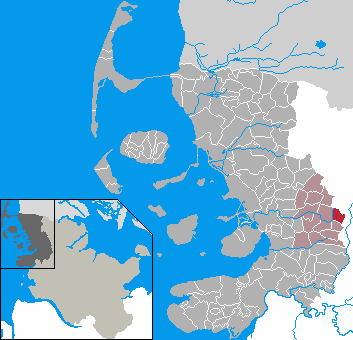
- Location of Bondelum within Nordfriesland district
- Interactive map of Bondelum
- Location within Germany Location within Schleswig-Holstein
- Coordinates: 54°34′N 9°16′E
- Country: Germany
- State: Schleswig-Holstein
- District: Nordfriesland
- Municipal assoc.: Viöl

Government
  - Mayor: Hans-August Carstensen

Area
  - Total: 9.18 km^{2} (3.54 sq mi)
- Elevation: 14 m (46 ft)

Population (2025-12-31)
  - Total: 180
  - Density: 20/km^{2} (51/sq mi)
- Time zone: UTC+01:00 (CET)
  - Summer (DST): UTC+02:00 (CEST)
- Postal codes: 25884
- Dialling codes: 04843
- Vehicle registration: NF
- Website: www.amt-vioel.de

Bondelum (North Frisian: Bonlem) is a municipality in the district of Nordfriesland, in Schleswig-Holstein, Germany.
