= Behrendorf, Schleswig-Holstein =

Behrendorf Bjerndrup
- Municipality
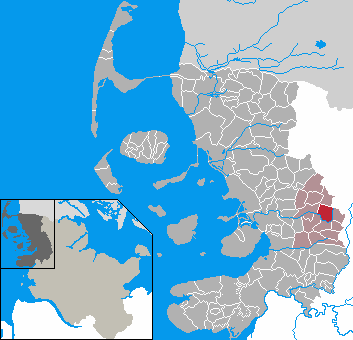
- Location of Behrendorf; Bjerndrup within Nordfriesland district
- Interactive map of Behrendorf; Bjerndrup
- Location within Germany Location within Schleswig-Holstein
- Coordinates: 54°34′N 9°13′E
- Country: Germany
- State: Schleswig-Holstein
- District: Nordfriesland
- Municipal assoc.: Viöl

Government
  - Mayor: Johannes Jensen

Area
  - Total: 15.29 km^{2} (5.90 sq mi)
- Elevation: 19 m (62 ft)

Population (2025-12-31)
  - Total: 577
  - Density: 37.7/km^{2} (97.7/sq mi)
- Time zone: UTC+01:00 (CET)
  - Summer (DST): UTC+02:00 (CEST)
- Postal codes: 25850
- Dialling codes: 04843
- Vehicle registration: NF
- Website: www.amt-vioel.de

Behrendorf (German pronunciation: [ˈbeːʁəndɔʁf]; Danish: Bjerndrup, Bjerrup) is a municipality in the district of Nordfriesland, in Schleswig-Holstein, Germany.
