= Ernst Unger =

German physician

Ernst Unger (2 April 1875 in Berlin – 13 September 1938 in Prenzlau) was a German physician and surgeon, who was regarded as a pioneer in kidney transplantation. He also set up one of the first blood donation services in Germany in 1932.
